= List of rail accidents (2010–2019) =

This is a list of rail accidents which occurred between 2010 and 2019. For a list of terrorist incidents involving trains, see List of terrorist incidents involving railway systems.

== 2010 ==
- 2 January
  - India – In Uttar Pradesh near Etawah, about 170 miles (270 kilometres) southwest of Lucknow, the Lichchavi Express entering the station in heavy fog ran into the stationary Magadh Express train, killing ten people and injuring ten more.
  - India – A second accident, similar to the above, also occurred on this date. In this second case two trains collided in dense fog near Kanpur, about 60 miles (100 kilometers) southwest of Lucknow, killing five people and injuring 40.
- 3 January – Turkey – Two trains collided between Bayirkoy and Vezirhan, killing one person and injuring three.
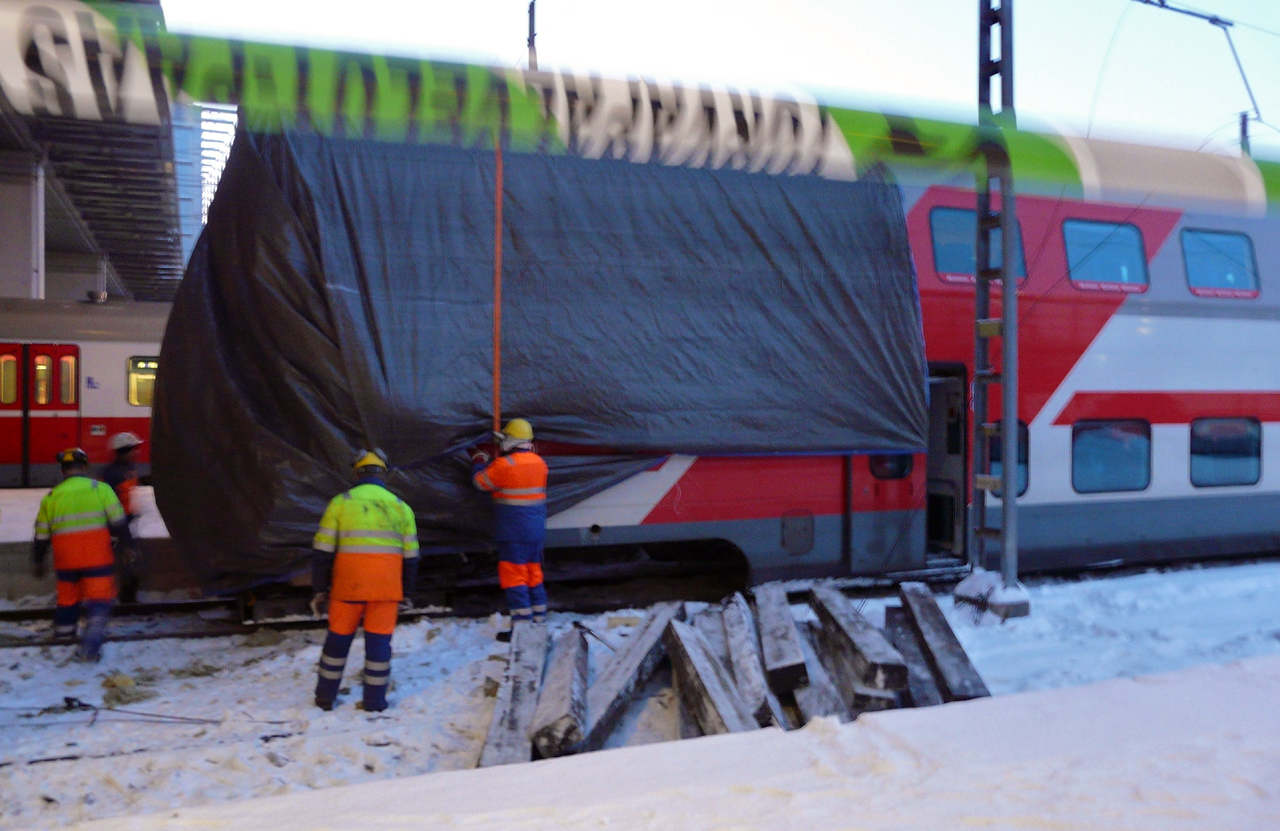
- After a train accident at Helsinki Central railway station, 2010
  4 January – Finland – 2010 Helsinki Central Station accident: A passenger train suffered a brake failure and crashed into a hotel at Helsinki Central station.
- 12 February – United States – A train derailed in the pocket track just north of Farragut North Washington Metro station after the front car left the tracks. One person was hospitalized.
- 15 February – Belgium – Halle train collision: Two passenger trains collided laterally in Buizingen near Brussels, killing 19 people and injuring 171.
- 25 February – Canada – A Via Rail train travelling from Halifax to Montreal derailed near Saint-Charles-de-Bellechasse outside Quebec City, injuring four people and causing significant damage to nearby homes.
- 15 March – United States – A METRO bus collided with a light rail METRO train in Houston, injuring nearly 20 people. Authorities claimed that the bus ran a traffic light that was red for ten seconds before the bus passed it at 29 miles per hour (47 km/h).
- 24 March – Norway – Sjursøya train accident: Sixteen goods wagons ran away for 8 km (5 mi) from a goods yard at Alnabu in Oslo, hitting and destroying a quayside warehouse. Three people died and four were seriously injured.
- 1 April – Slovakia – A locomotive ran into a stationary passenger train after its brakes failed during a test ride in Spišská Nová Ves, killing three people and seriously injuring eight.
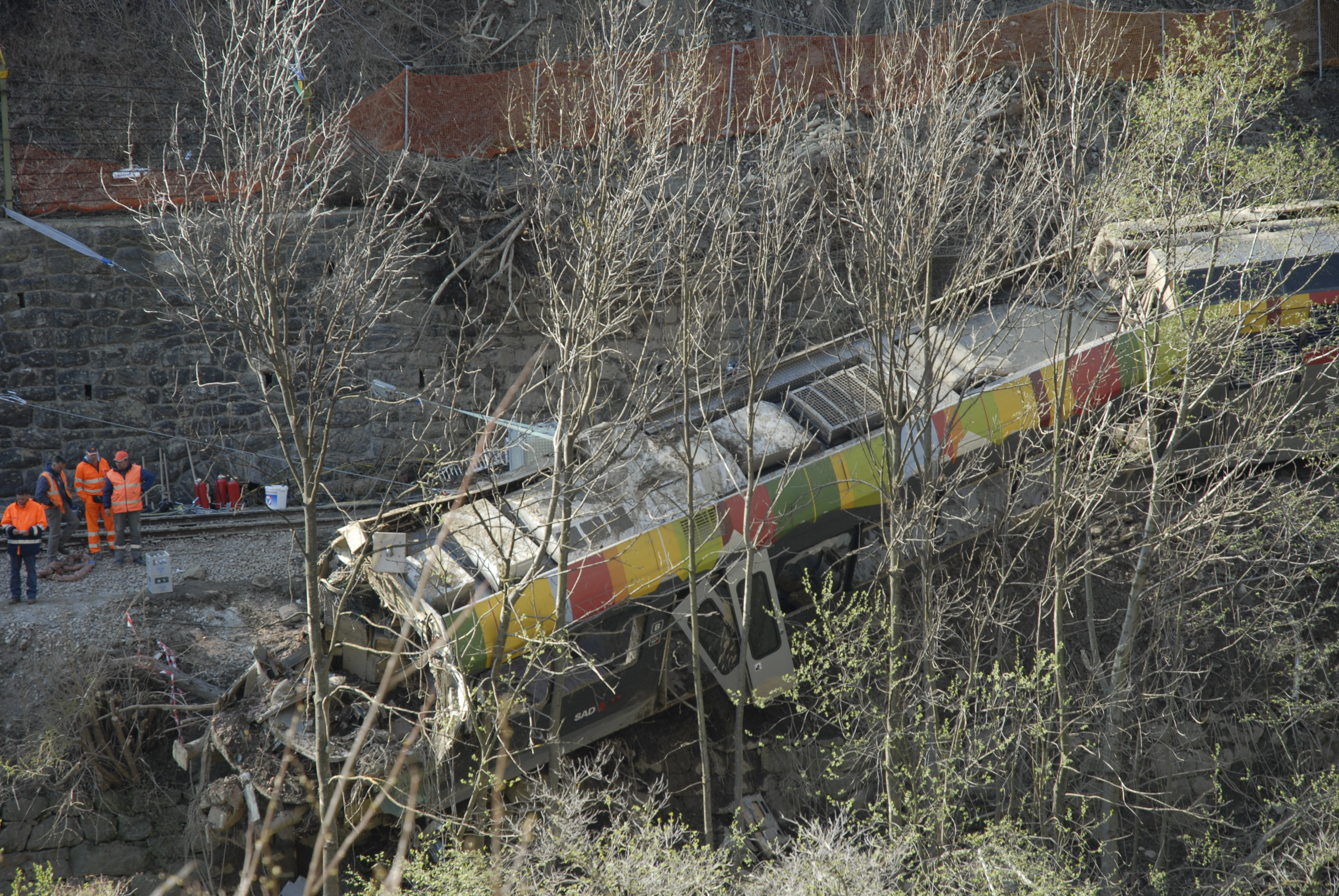
- Merano derailment.
  12 April – Italy – Merano derailment: A passenger train was hit by a landslide and partially derailed near Merano, South Tyrol, killing nine and injuring 28.
- 21 April – South Africa – 2010 Pretoria train accident: Coaches of a luxury tourist train operated by Rovos Rail ran away and derailed at Pretoria during a locomotive changeover. Three crew members died while 9 passengers were injured, six of them critically.
- 4 May – Australia – A passenger train collided with a freight train approximately 3 km (2 mi) south of Craigieburn railway station, injuring five.
- 13 May – United States – A northbound Amtrak Piedmont collided with a truck towing a low loader in Mebane, North Carolina, injuring between 11 and 17 people.
- 23 May – China – 2010 Jiangxi derailment: A passenger train derailed after being knocked off the tracks by a landslide in Jiangxi, killing 19 people and injuring 71.
- 25 May – India – A passenger train derailed at Naugachia, injuring 11 people.
- 28 May – India – Jnaneswari Express train derailment – A train derailed in the West Midnapore district of West Bengal, caused by either sabotage or a bomb that damaged the railway track, and was struck by an on-coming goods train, killing 148.
- 6 June – United Kingdom – Falls of Cruachan derailment – A First ScotRail passenger train collided with boulders that fell on the line near Falls of Cruachan, then derailed and caught fire. Several people were hospitalised.
- 16 June – Germany – A passenger train collided with a derailed freight train at Peine, injuring 16.
- 18 June – India – Eight coaches and two engines of the Vasco-Howrah Amaravati Express (8048) derailed near Koppal in Karnataka after striking a road roller at an unmanned level-crossing. Six people, including the drivers of the road roller and the train, were injured.
- 22 June – Republic of the Congo – Yanga derailment: A passenger train derailed between Bilinga and Tchitondi, about 60 km (37 mi) from Pointe-Noire, killing at least 76 people.
- 23 June – Spain – Castelldefels train accident – 12 people died and 14 were injured after being struck by an Alaris while crossing the tracks at Castelldefels Playa station.
- 28 June – Czech Republic – Ústí nad Labem derailment: A CityElefant passenger train from Prague to Ústí nad Labem derailed while entering the Ústí nad Labem station, killing the driver and injuring 11 passengers.
- 13 July – Poland – Two trains collided at Korzybie, Pomeranian Voivodeship, injuring 36.
- 19 July – India – Sainthia train collision: At least 63 people died and over 150 were injured after the Uttar Banga Express rear-ended the stationary Vananchal Express at Sainthia railway station.
- 21 July – United States – Miami: 2 Metromover Trains collided at 12th Street Train Station, injuring 16.
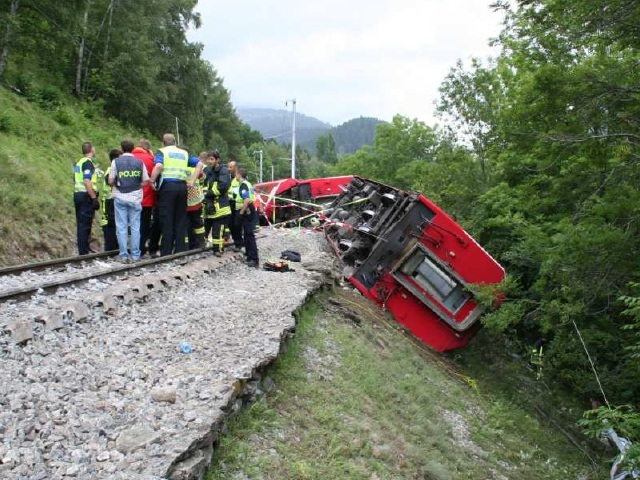
- Fiesch derailment
  23 July – Switzerland – Fiesch derailment: One person was killed and 42 are injured after a Glacier Express derailed near Fiesch on the Matterhorn Gotthard Bahn.
- 25 July – Netherlands – A driver and another rail worker were injured after a Speno railgrinder failed to stop in front of the buffer stop at Stavoren. A shop lying behind the track was destroyed.
- 6 August – Italy – Circumvesuviana derailment: One person died and about 40 were injured in a derailment in Naples, on the Circumvesuviana railway.
- 6 August – Israel – A passenger train struck a minibus near Kiryat Gat, killing seven and injuring 20.
- 11 August – United States – In Jefferson County, Colorado, a miniature train carrying 30 people derailed at a curve, 15 people were injured.
- 17 August – United Kingdom – Little Cornard derailment: A sewage tanker lorry struck and derailed a passenger train (the 17.31 National Express East Anglia service from Sudbury to Marks Tey) on a level crossing at Little Cornard, Suffolk, injuring eighteen people, two of them seriously.
- 17 August – Germany – The Intercity-Express from Frankfurt to Paris hit a truck that had slid onto the railway near Lambrecht. The first two carriages derailed and ten people were injured, one seriously.
- 17 August – India – Four people died in an accident on the Faizabad-Lucknow railway at Goryamau station in Barabanki district between Rudauli and Rozagaon.
- 25 August – South Africa – Blackheath train accident: A Metrorail commuter train struck a minibus taxi carrying children to school, killing ten and injuring five. Witnesses stated that the minibus drove around closed booms; the driver was later convicted on ten counts of murder and four counts of attempted murder and was sentenced to 20 years imprisonment.
- 10 September – United States – A conductor lost his arm after two Union Pacific freight trains collided in Fontana, California.
- 12 September – Sweden – A woman died, two people were seriously injured and 15 sustained minor injuries after an X 2000 high-speed train collided with a backhoe loader at Kimstad near Linköping.
- 15 September – Belgium – Two trains collided at Aarlen, injuring 30–40 people, two seriously.
- 24 September – Tunisia – Bir el-Bey train collision: Two trains collided at Bir El Bay, killing one and injuring 57.
- 20 September – India – 2010 Badarwas train collision, In Badarwas, two trains collided head on, killing 23 and injuring 30.
- 30 September – New Zealand – A Wellington commuter EMU derailed after striking a landslip and was struck less than a minute later by a sister unit travelling on the opposite line. Two people were hospitalised. The TAIC investigation found that no special track inspections were made and no speed restrictions were put in place despite rainfall well above average and the site at high risk of landslide.
- 30 September – United States – Two Canadian National ore trains collided head-on twelve miles (19 km) north of Two Harbors, Minnesota, injuring all five crew members.
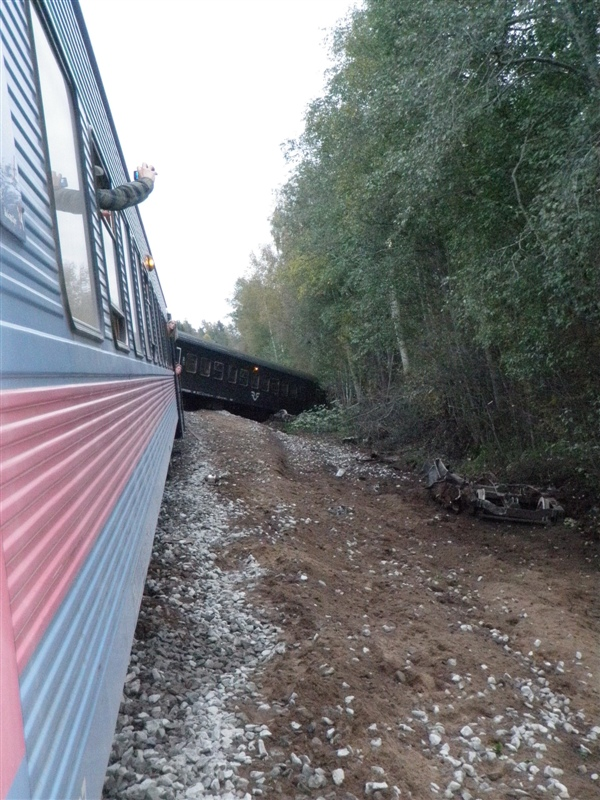
- Skotterud derailment.
  1 October – Norway – Skotterud derailment: 40 people were injured after a train derailed at Skotterud.
- 2 October – Indonesia – Petarukan train collision: 36 people were killed and 60 were injured after a train ran into the back of another at Petarukan.
- 2 October – Indonesia – A train crashed at Solo, Central Java, killing one person.
- 12 October – Ukraine – Marhanets train accident: At least 43 people were killed in a collision between a train and a bus at Marhanets, Dnipropetrovsk Oblast.
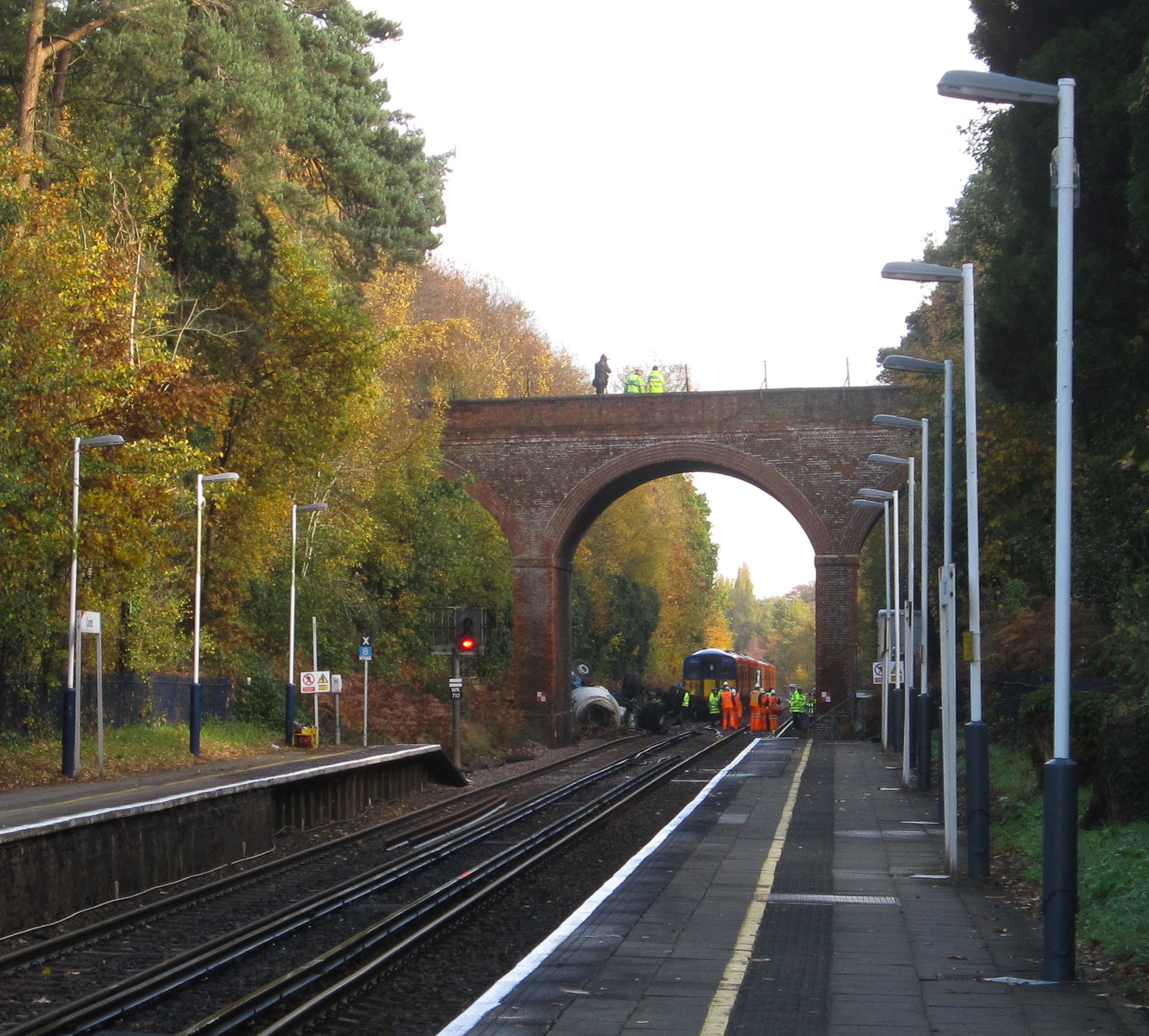
- Oxshott rail accident
  5 November – United Kingdom – Seven people were injured after a lorry fell off an overbridge onto a passing South West train at Oxshott, Surrey.
- 8 December – Bangladesh – Two passenger trains collided head-on near Narsingdi, killing 19.

== 2011 ==
- 1 January – Argentina – Two passenger trains collided in Buenos Aires, injuring forty-five people.
- 29 January – Germany – Hordorf train collision: A freight train and a passenger train collided near Hordorf in Saxony-Anhalt on the Magdeburg–Thale line, killing ten people and injuring 23.
- 15 February – Germany – A collision occurred while two trains were being coupled at Berlin Ostbahnhof. One passenger was hospitalized.
- 17 February – Argentina – A train rear-ended another train near San Miguel station, 30 kilometres (19 mi) from Buenos Aires, killing four passengers and injuring 120. An investigation found that two of the four brakes from the Ferrobaires train's engine were unusable because "one was blocked and the other had been locked and nailed down."
- 13 March – United States – 2011 California BART train derailment: Two cars of a ten-car BART train derailed in Northern California. Three people suffered minor injuries.
- 19 March – United States – In Spartanburg, South Carolina's Cleveland Park, a miniature red and silver F-series locomotive carrying minors derailed, killing 1 and injuring 28 people.
- 23 March – Germany – A passenger train collided with a lorry on a level crossing near Gronau, injuring 14.
- 27 March – Canada – About 20 cars of a train derailed and caught fire near Port Hope en route to Toronto. Families in 20 houses fled.
- 28 March – United States – A CSX train travelling through Newton Falls, Ohio with an estimated 100 cars of mixed freight (including hoppers and tankers), suffered a 12-car derailment. Three rail cars fell off a bridge and onto Center Street. Residents within 150 metres of the crash were evacuated.
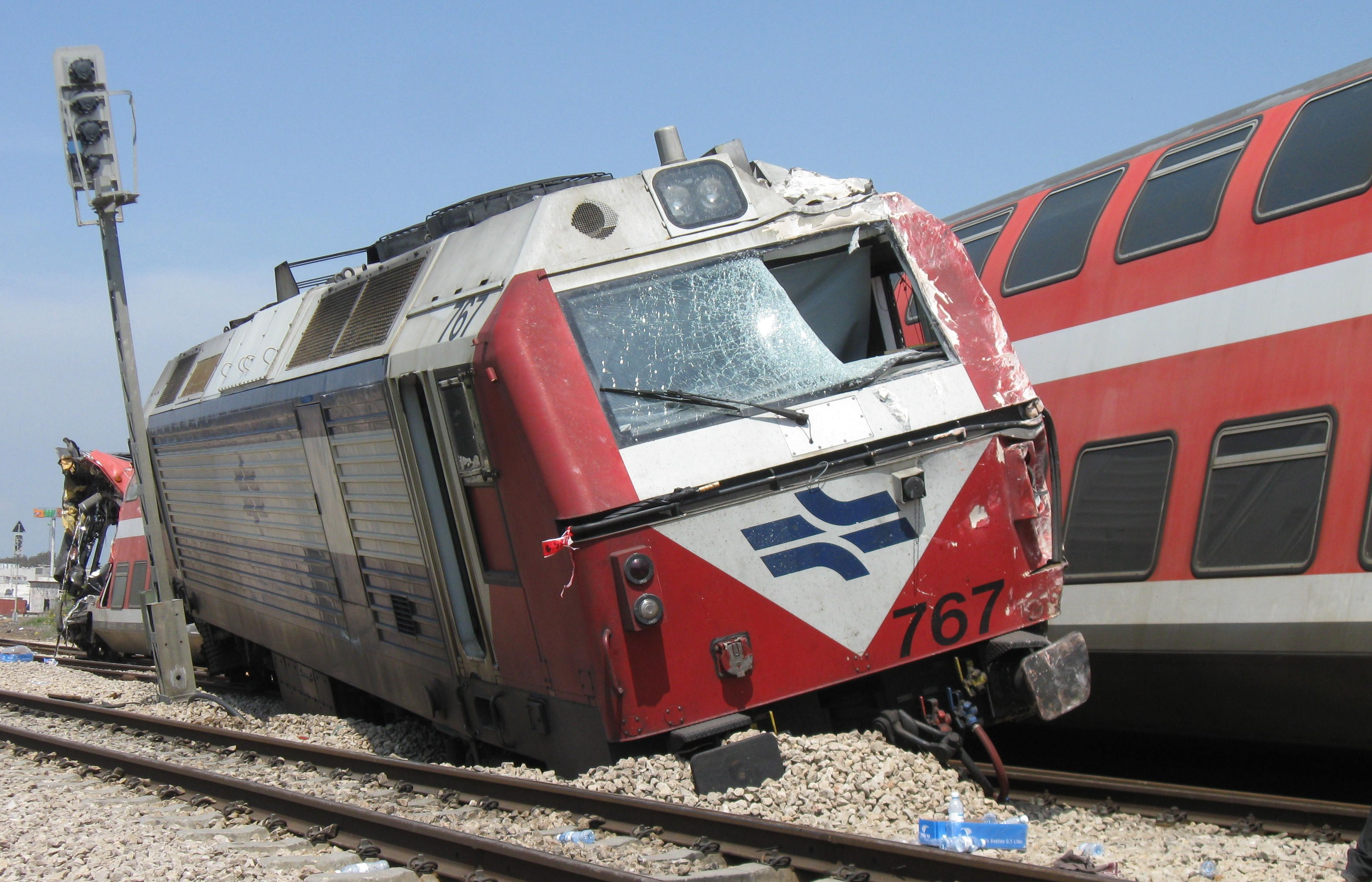
- Netanya
  7 April – Israel – Two trains collided near Netanya, injuring 60 people.
- 27 April – Taiwan – Six people were killed and 61 injured in Alishan after a falling tree struck a train carrying mostly tourists from mainland China.
- 28 April – Poland – A train derailed after hitting a lorry in Mosty, Pomeranian Voivodeship, killing two and injuring at least 20.
- 8 May – United States – A PATH train collided with the spring bumper at Hoboken Terminal, New Jersey, injuring 34 people.
- 20 May – South Africa – 857 people were injured, 25 seriously, after a rear-end collision at Soweto.
- 24 May – United States – In Mineral Springs, South Carolina, a CSX train collided onto another Union Pacific train, killing two.
- 27 May – Japan – The limited-express train Super Ozora No. 14, en route from Kushiro to Sapporo in Hokkaido, caught fire in a tunnel on the Sekisho Line after the second car of the six-car formation derailed. 39 were treated for smoke inhalation or minor burn injuries. The incident contributed to the apparent suicide of JR Hokkaido's president.
- 3 June – United States – A Metra commuter train from Aurora, Illinois and an Amtrak train heading to Carbondale, Illinois collided at Chicago's Union Station, injuring at least five.
- 24 June – United States – Despite the working signals on the track, a semi driving on a rural stretch of U.S. Route 95 near Reno and Sparks, struck a westbound California Zephyr Amtrak passenger train, killing six.
- 7 July – India – A Mathura Chhapra Express train rammed into a bus at an unmanned crossing in Thanagaon, Kanshiram Nagar district, Uttar Pradesh, killing 38 and injuring 30.
- 10 July – India – Fatehpur derailment – The Kalka Mail train running from Howrah to Delhi derailed near Fatehpur, Uttar Pradesh, killing 70 and injuring more than 300.
- 10 July – India – The engine along with four coaches of the Guwahati Puri Express derailed between Rangiya and Ghagrapar, Nalbari district, Assam and capsized in a rivulet, injuring more than 100 people, 20 critically.
- 11 July – United States – An Amtrak Downeaster passenger train from Boston, Massachusetts heading to Portland, Maine was struck by a garbage truck at a crossing in North Berwick, Maine, killing the truck driver and setting the locomotive and one passenger car on fire.
- 17 July – United States – A train derailed, injuring the engineer and conductor, and hopper cars containing corn fell into Rice Creek in Fridley, Minnesota after heavy rains caused a washout of the BNSF rail bridge.
- 23 July – China – Wenzhou train collision – Due to signal failure, a high-speed train rear-ended a stopped high-speed train at a speed of 99 km/h (62 mph) near Wenzhou, killing 40 people and injuring at least 192. Six carriages derailed, while four carriages fell off a viaduct.
- 26 July – Poland – Seven goods wagons rolled for 2 km (1.2 mi) before it derailed and crashed into a railway station building, killing three.
- 31 July – India – The engine and some coaches of the Guwahati Bangalore Express derailed and were hit by another train in Malda district, West Bengal, killing three and injuring 200.
- 8 August – Switzerland – A passenger train and locomotive collided at Döttingen, injuring 22. The passenger train passed a signal at danger.
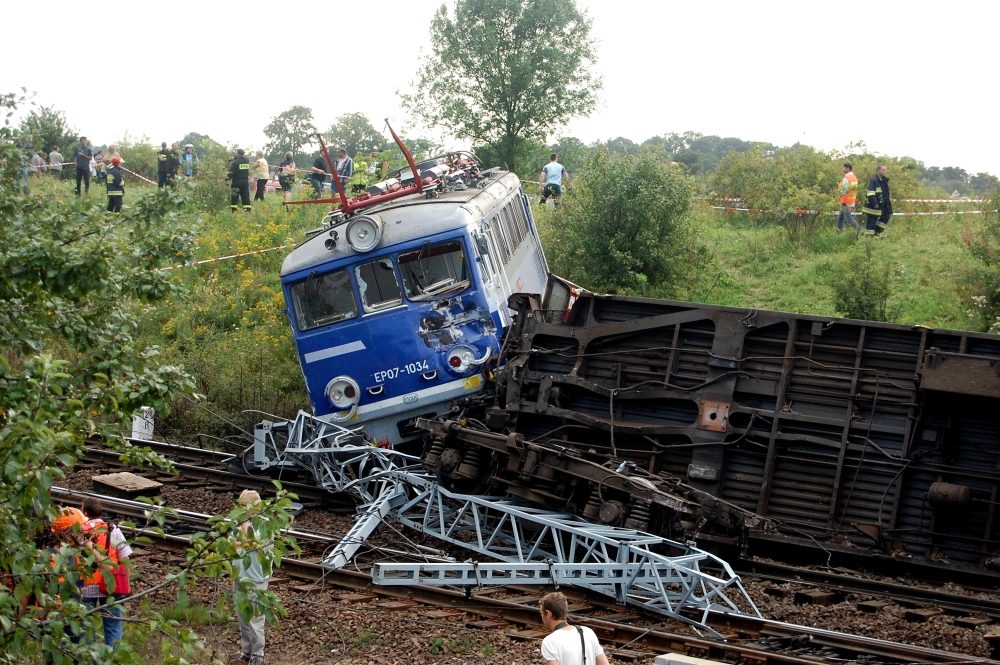
- 2011 Baby derailment
  12 August – Poland – 2011 Baby derailment: A passenger train derailed due to high speed at Baby, Piotrków County, killing one passenger and injuring 84.
- 22 August – Algeria – 2011 Boudouaou rail accident: Two trains collided near Boudouaou railway station, about 40 km (25 mi) from Algiers. 24 passengers were injured and one was killed.
- 28 August – Brazil – In Rio De Janeiro, a tram train derailed after a brake failure was reported, 6 people were killed and 50 people were injured.
- 31 August – India – Two goods trains collided near Tangiriapal railway station, about 65 km (40 mi) from Keonjhar on the Jakhapura-Banspani railway line. Five crew members were killed.
- 13 September – India – A passenger train slammed into a stationary cargo train near Chennai, killing ten and injuring 52.
- 13 September – Argentina – 2011 Flores rail crash – In the Flores barrio of Buenos Aires, a bus crashed into a train, which derailed and collided with a second train, killing 11 and injuring 228, 20 severely.
- 15 September – Argentina – A collision in Buenos Aires between a bus, a concrete mixer and a light-rail train injured 90 people.
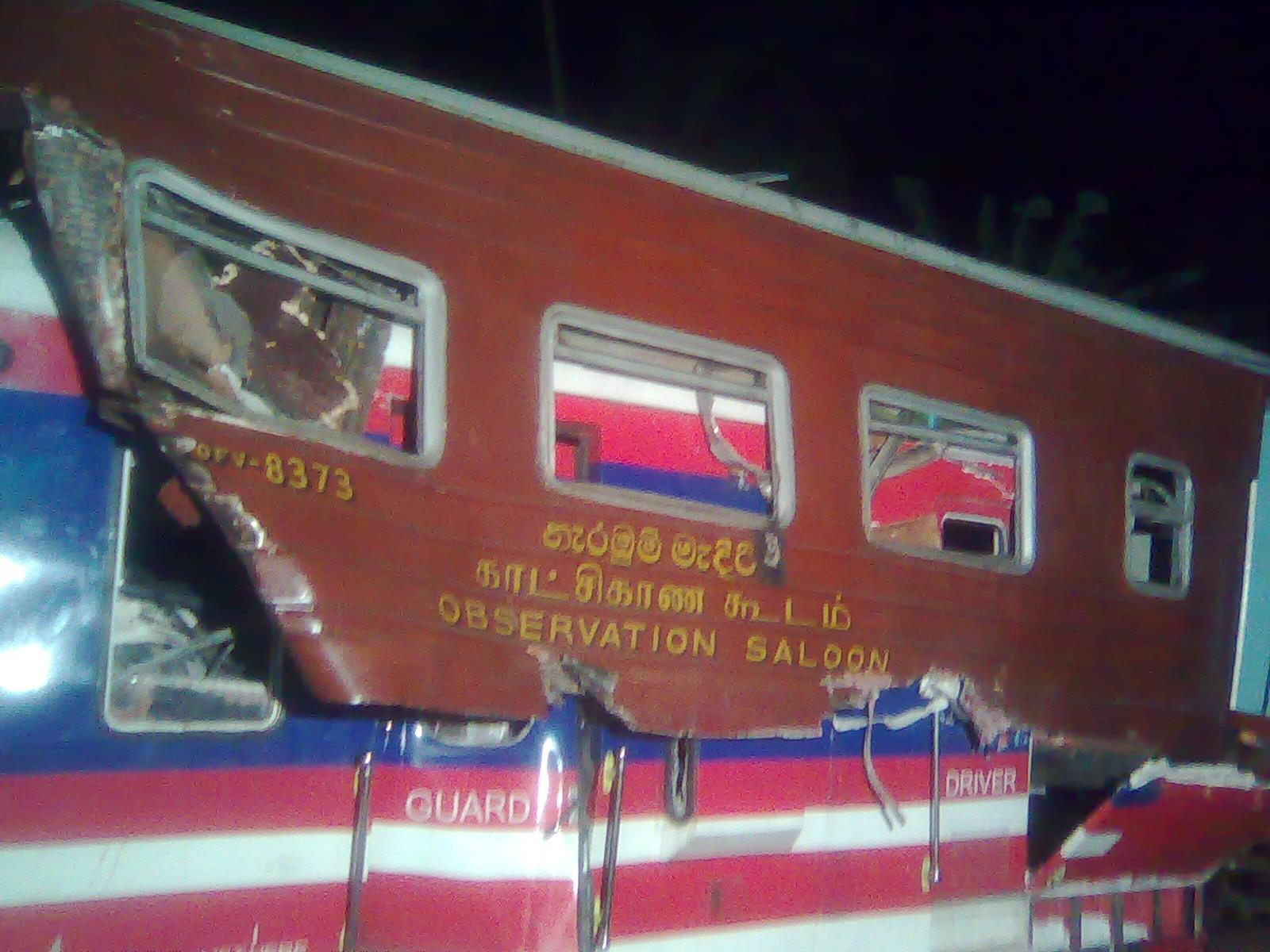
- Alawwa rail accident
  17 September – Sri Lanka – 2011 Alawwa rail accident: A passenger train rammed into an observation car at the back of another train near Alawwa, about 60 km (37 mi) northeast of Colombo, killing three and injuring more than 30.
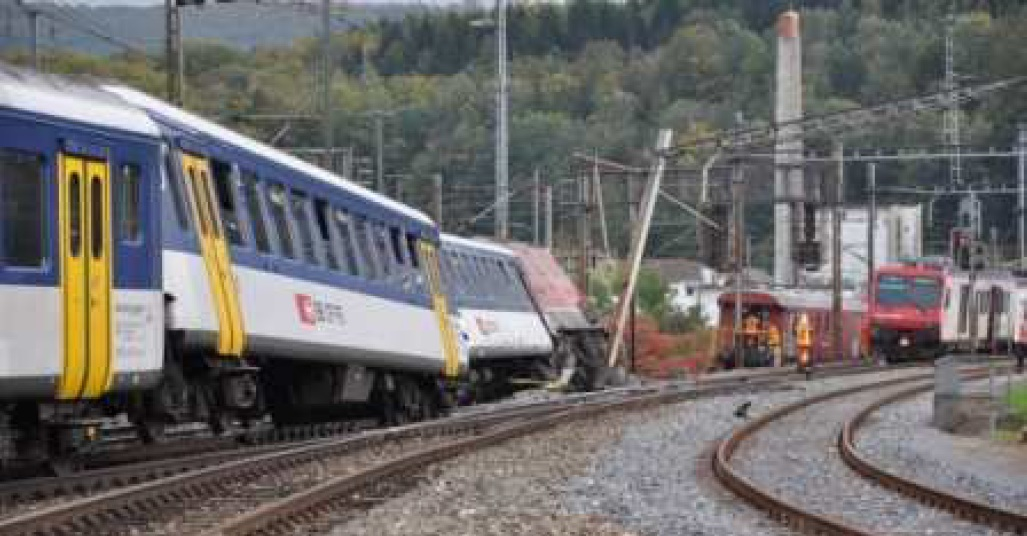
- Olten
  6 October – Switzerland – Two trains collided at Olten, injuring two people.
- 7 October – United States – 26 cars of a 131-car Iowa Interstate Railroad freight train derailed and exploded near Tiskilwa in Bureau County, Illinois, approximately 160 kilometres (99 mi) west of Chicago. 800 people were evacuated.
- 12 October – United States – In Oakland, California a southbound Amtrak San Joaquin train passed a red signal and collided with a stopped Coast Starlight train, injuring 17.
- 31 October – Malaysia – A Sabah State Railway train collided with a petrol tanker in Kota Kinabalu resulting in an explosion that injured 12 passengers.
- 1 November – Moldova – A bus collided with a train in Anenii Noi, killing eight people and leaving a dozen injured.
- 2 November – Argentina – A freight train collided with a school bus in a rural area of San Luis Province, killing eight girls and injuring 41.
- 22 November – India – A fire on board a Doon Express train in Jharkhand destroyed two coaches and killed seven people.
- 28 November – Netherlands – a Sprinter collided with a stationary Sprinter at Leiden Centraal, injuring three.
- 27 December – Australia – Flood waters from Tropical Cyclone Grant washed away the southern abutment of the Edith River bridge, derailing a northbound Genesee & Wyoming Australia intermodal freight train on its way to Darwin near Katherine, south of Darwin, injuring one crew member. A crew van and five wagons fell into the river.

== 2012 ==
- 6 January – United States – Three CSX freight trains collided in Westville, Indiana, resulting in a fire. Many stack cars were derailed as well. Two injuries were reported. The NTSB report placed the blame on the second train which failed to obey signals, causing it to run into the first train. The third train ran into the derailed trains shortly thereafter.
- 13 January – Germany – A passenger train of Nord-Ostsee-Bahn collided with a herd of cattle on the track from Sylt island to Hamburg, near Bargum, Nordfriesland, killing one passenger and injuring three.
- 19 January – Spain – A commuter train collided with an empty train at Barcelona Clot Aragó station after the first train failed to obey a restriction signal, injuring six.
- 1 February – United States – The Amtrak Wolverine train from Pontiac, Michigan to Chicago, carrying 71 passengers and 5 crew, struck a stalled tractor trailer in Leoni Township, Michigan. The lead engine and at least two cars derailed. Six people were injured.
- 3 February – India – A passenger train derailed after striking a construction vehicle in Assam, killing three and injuring 50.
- 9 February – Spain – A commuter train crashed into a buffer stop at Mataró station, 30 km (19 mi) northeast of Barcelona. The driver was seriously injured and ten passengers were injured.
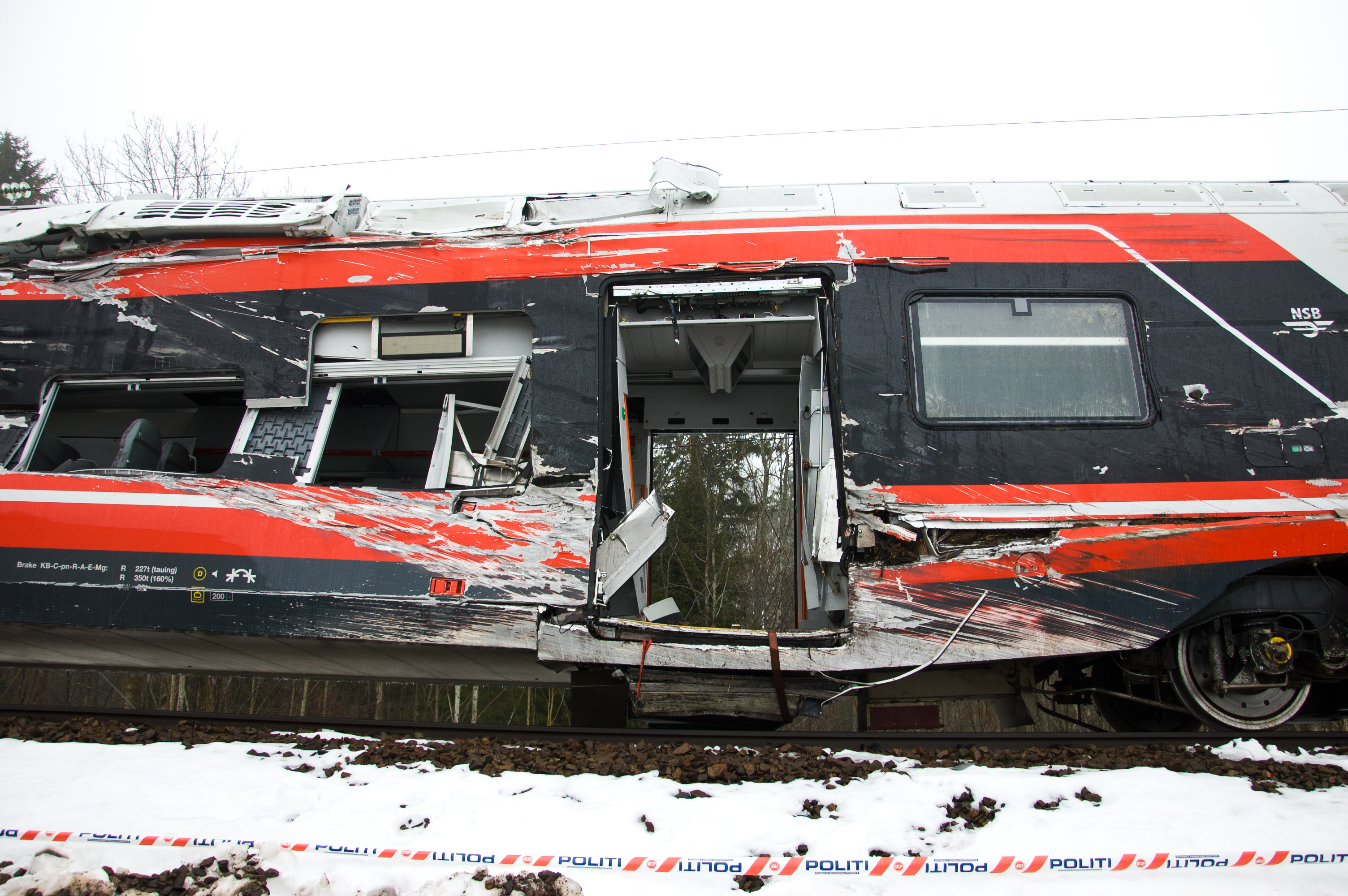
- Nykirke
  15 February – Norway – A passenger train derailed near Nykirke after overspeeding on the Vestfold Line due to driver error. Five crew members were injured.
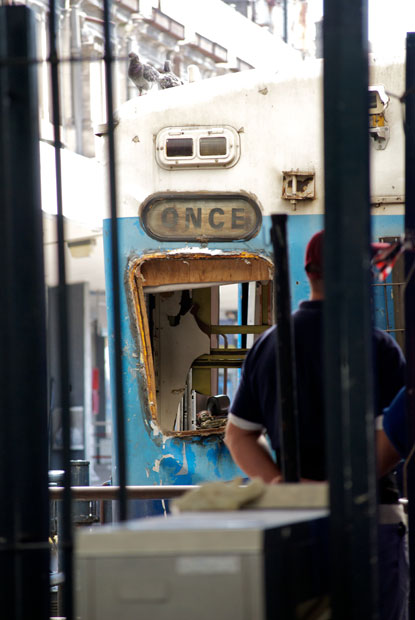
- 2012 Buenos Aires rail disaster
  22 February – Argentina – 2012 Buenos Aires rail disaster: A train crashed into a buffer stop at a station in Buenos Aires, killing 51 people and injuring more than 700.
- 26 February – Canada – 2012 Burlington Via derailment: A Via Rail train derailed near Burlington, Ontario, killing three engineers and injuring dozens.
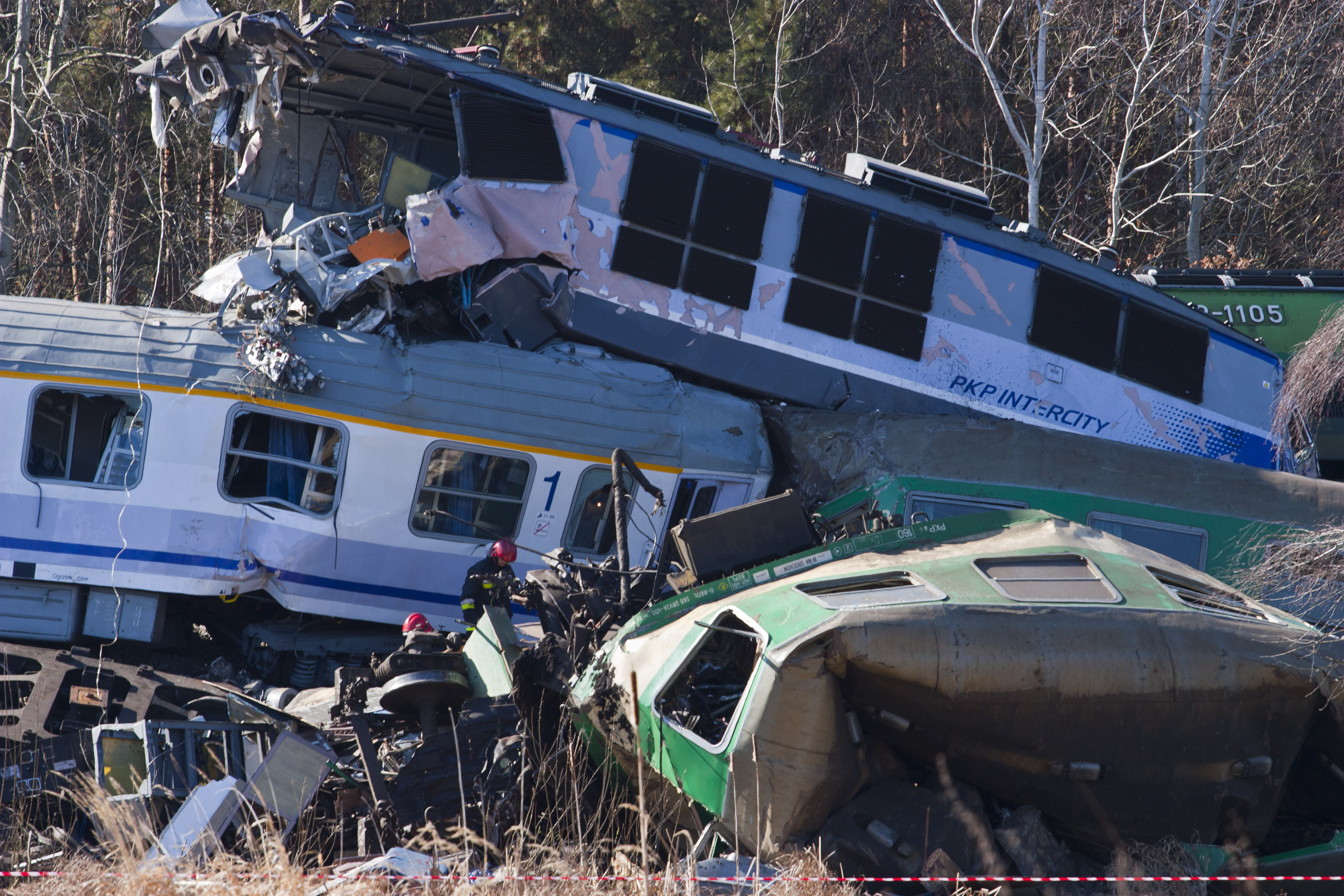
- Szczekociny
  3 March – Poland – Szczekociny rail crash: Two passenger trains collided head-on near Szczekociny, killing 16 and injuring 58.
- 6 March – Ireland – Several detonators exploded in the driver's kit in the train cab of a DART train, injuring the driver's hands.
- 13 April – Germany – A regional train on its way from Frankfurt to Hanau collided with a railway maintenance vehicle on the same track near Offenbach. The train's driver and two construction workers died, 12 train passengers and a conductor were injured. The investigation found that the excavator had been deployed onto the live track rather than the one reserved for construction work.
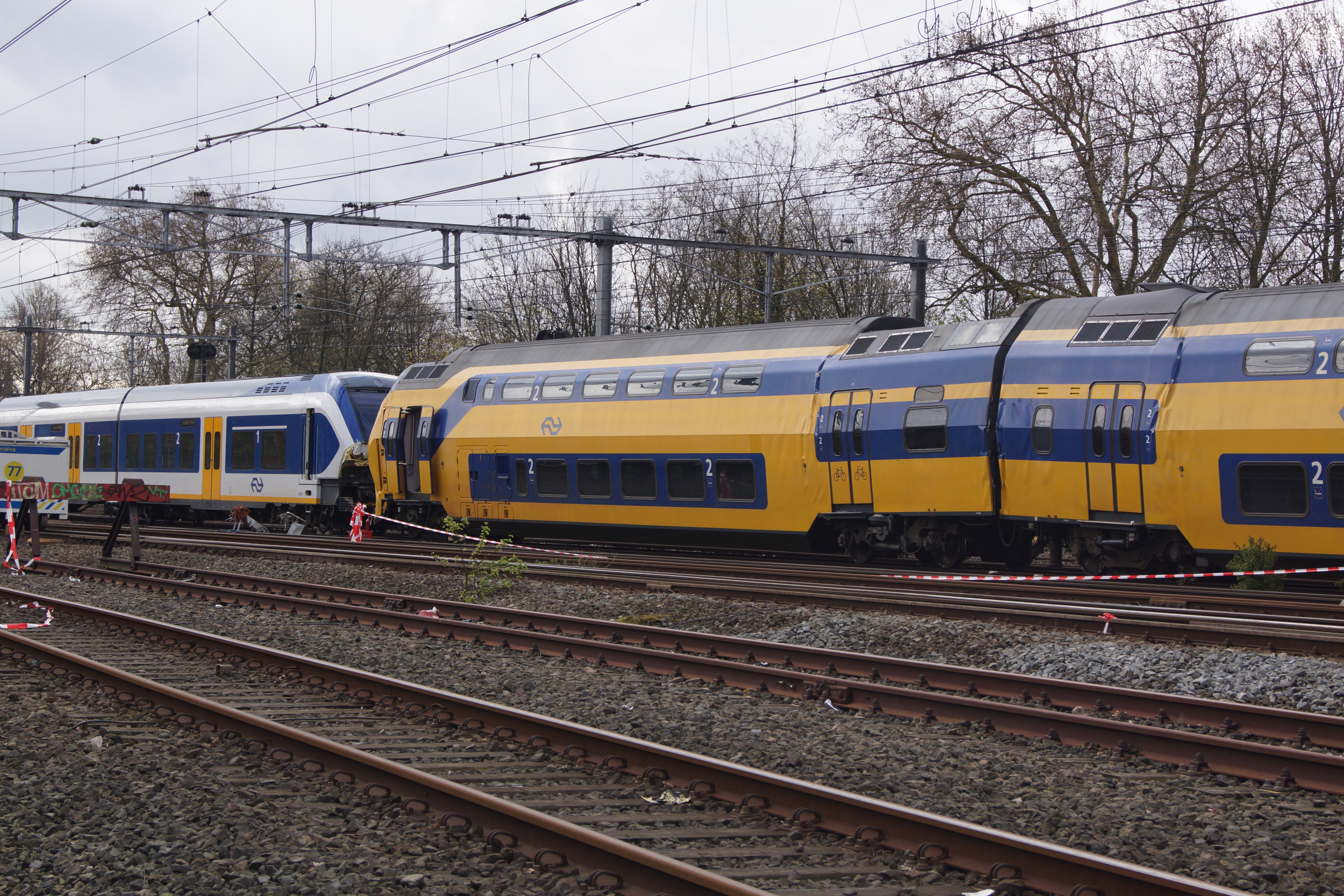
- Amsterdam Westerpark train collision.
  21 April – Netherlands – Amsterdam Westerpark train collision: Two trains collided head-on between Amsterdam Centraal and Amsterdam Sloterdijk stations, killing one and injuring at least 117.
- 10 May – Romania – More than 92 people were injured in a crash involving three trams in western Bucharest.
- 13 May – United States – At Miami Airport, a Mia Mover Train derailed, injuring two people.
- 22 May – India – Penukonda train collision: The Bangalore-bound Hampi Express crashed into a stationary freight train near Penukonda in Andhra Pradesh, killing 25 and injuring 43.
- 31 May – India – Mahrawa derailment: Four people died and over fifty were injured in the derailment of the Doon express in Mahrawa, Uttar Pradesh.
- 12 June – Germany – A tram rammed into two waiting trams at a stop in Essen, injuring 28.
- 24 June – United States – Three crew members were killed after two Union Pacific trains slammed into each other just east of Goodwell, about 480 kilometres northwest of Oklahoma City. The crash triggered a diesel-fueled fireball that appeared to weld the locomotives together.
- 4 July – United States – A Union Pacific Railroad coal train heading to Wisconsin derailed, collapsing an overpass on Shermer Road in Glenview, Illinois and killing a couple whose car was buried by the debris.
- 11 July – United States – A Norfolk Southern train with two locomotives and 98 cars derailed in Columbus, Ohio, near the Ohio State Fairgrounds. The resulting explosion, caused in part due to the burning of 76,000 litres (17,000 imperial gallons) of ethanol, caused a mile-wide (1600 m) evacuation. Two people were injured.
- 13 July – South Africa – Hectorspruit level crossing accident: A goods train hauling coal from Witbank to Maputo smashed into a truck carrying farm workers at a controlled level crossing near Hectorspruit, Mpumalanga, killing 26 people.
- 17 July – Egypt – A passenger train struck wooden planks and chunks of metal put down by people to cross the tracks and derailed at Giza, injuring fifteen passengers.
- 21 July – United States – A Kansas City Southern freight train collided with a BNSF coal train and derailed in Barton County, Missouri, injuring two railway workers.
- 24 July, 29 September and 10 October – Germany – 2012 Stuttgart derailments: Three InterCities derailed in Stuttgart.
- 30 July – India – Nellore train fire: 32 passengers died and 27 were injured in a fire on the Delhi-Chennai Tamil Nadu Express near Nellore, Andhra Pradesh.
- 6 August – Argentina – At least 35 people were injured, six seriously, after a train derailed and crashed into an electricity pylon in a central station of Retiro in Buenos Aires.
- 6 August – United States – 32 cars derailed from a mixed-freight train traveling from Lynwood to Macon, Georgia on the Norfolk Southern Railway line running aside Eighth Avenue in Cramerton, North Carolina. 31 homes were evacuated. Among the cars that derailed were tanker cars carrying phosphoric acid. Cleanup lasted approximately two months.
- 21 August – United States – Two pedestrians died after being buried under coal by a derailed CSX train on a railway bridge in downtown Ellicott City, Maryland.
- 11 September – Netherlands – A HTM city tram crashed into the back of another tram at an intersection near the railroad station of The Hague Hollands Spoor. 36 people were injured, including one of the operators.
- 24 September – Italy – A train driver died, and 25 passengers were injured when a high-speed Freccia Argento train, travelling between Rome and Lecce collided with a lorry at a level crossing in Cisternino.
- 26 October – Philippines – A Bicol Express train bound for Ligao, Albay was derailed in a flooded area of Sariaya, Quezon, injuring eight passengers.
- 26 October – Slovakia – A passenger train Os2018 rear-ended stationary passenger train Os4618 between Bratislava-Vinohrady and Bratislava-Main Stations, injuring 23.
- 3 November – Australia – A Metro Trains Melbourne Comeng collided with a lorry at the Abbotts Road level crossing in Dandenong South on the Cranbourne line. The train derailed and the first car ended up on its side. A passenger died from a heart attack and eight suffered minor injuries while the driver was seriously injured.
- 4 November – United Kingdom – A passenger train from Edinburgh to Aberdeen derailed at Inverkeilor, Angus with one minor injury reported.
- 5 November – Moldova – A minibus collided with a passenger train Bender-Chișinău in Merenii Noi, killing four people and injuring six.
- 9 November – Myanmar – 2012 Myanmar train crash: A train carrying liquid fuel and travelling from Mandalay to Myitkyina crashed and exploded near Kantbalu, killing at least 27 people and injuring more than 80.
- 15 November – United States – Midland train crash: Four people were killed and 16 others were injured after a Union Pacific ES44AC #7877 train struck a parade float in Midland, Texas.
- 17 November – Egypt – Manfalut railway accident: A school bus was hit by a train near Manfalut, 350 km (220 mi) south of Cairo, killing at least 50 children and the bus driver and injuring more than a dozen others. The Egyptian minister of transport, Mohamed Rashad Al Matini, subsequently resigned.
- 22 November – South Korea – A Busan Subway train rear-ended another train, injuring 40.
- 25 November – Italy – A train hit a van at a level crossing near Rossano, Calabria, killing at least six workers from Romania and Bulgaria.
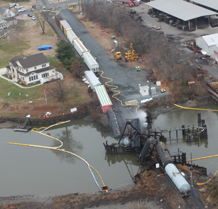
- 2012 Paulsboro train derailment
  30 November – United States – Paulsboro train derailment: A Conrail train crossing an old-style swing bridge derailed near Paulsboro, New Jersey, resulting in one car leaking vinyl chloride into the air. About 100 people were treated for chemical exposure.
- 19 December – Germany – Two freight trains tore through a stalled bus and derailed at a level crossing in Düsseldorf. The bus driver was treated for shock.

== 2013 ==
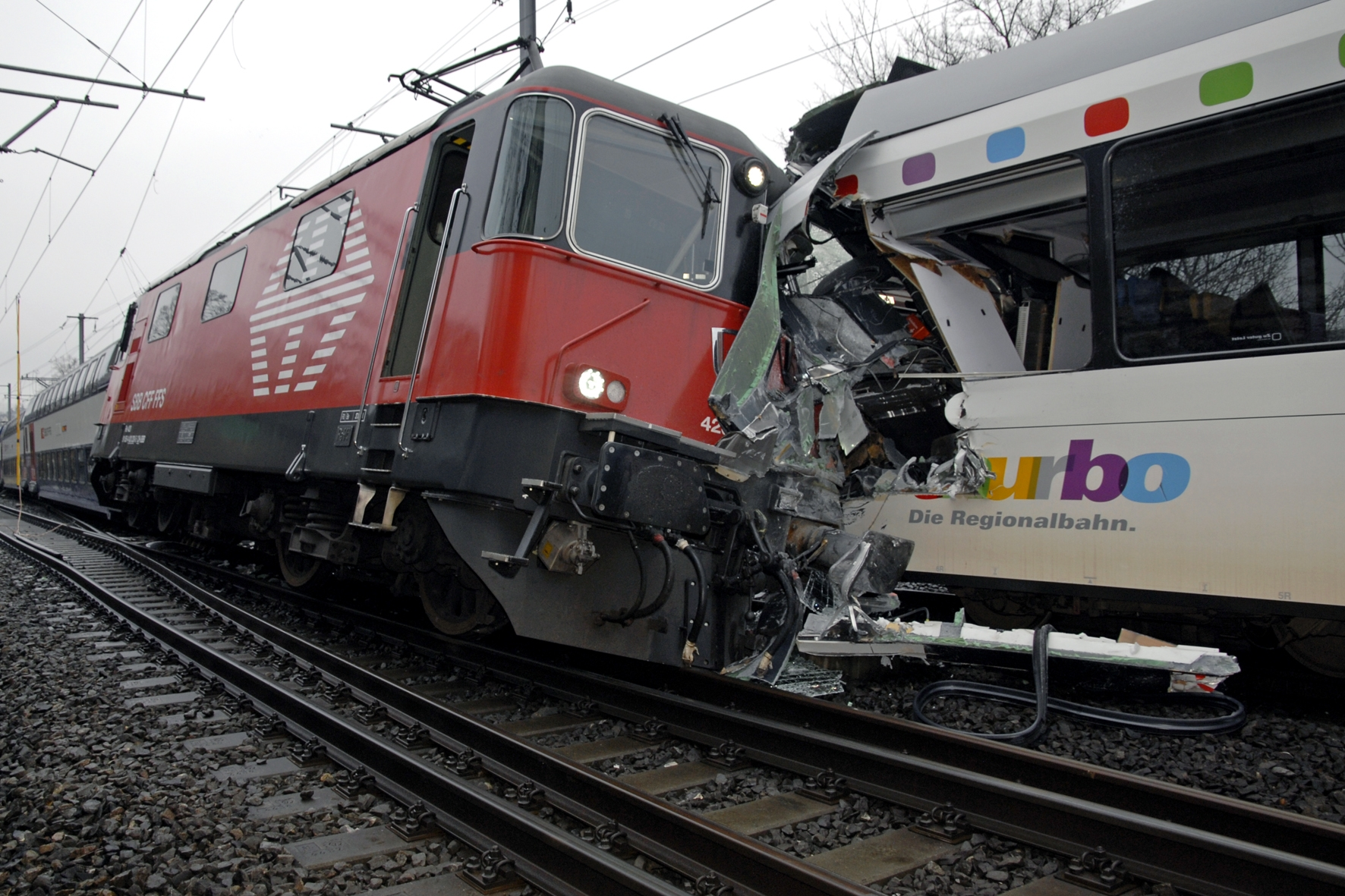
- 2013 Neuhausen am Rheinfall train collision
  10 January – Switzerland – 2013 Neuhausen am Rheinfall train collision – Two trains collided on the Rheinfall railway line, about 360 metres (1,180 ft) from the station at Neuhausen am Rheinfall, injuring 27.
- 15 January – Egypt – Badrashin railway accident – A passenger train derailed at Giza and collided with a freight train, killing 19 people and injuring 230.
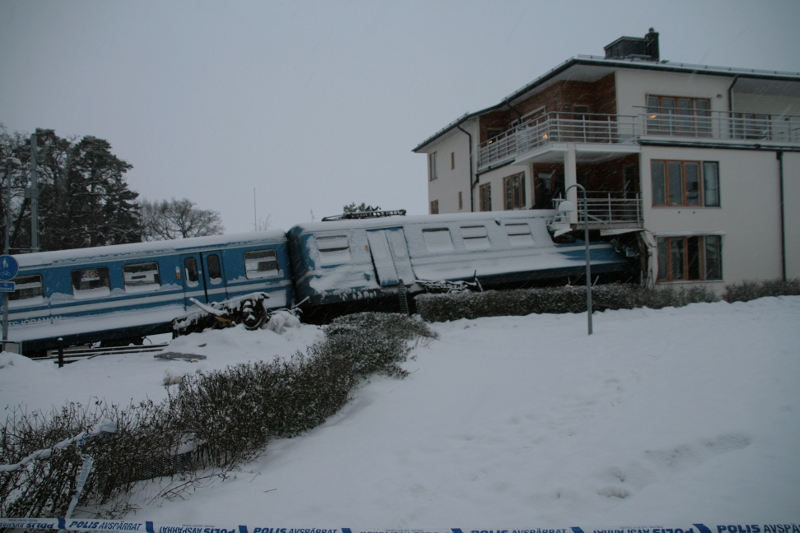
- 2013 Saltsjöbanan train crash
  15 January – Sweden – 2013 Saltsjöbanan train crash – A passenger train on the Saltsjöbanan overran a set of buffer stops and crashed into a block of flats at Stockholm. Investigations revealed that a cleaner, who was seriously injured, accidentally started the train that was parked in a depot without proper safety measures.
- 21 January – Austria – Two Vienna S-Bahn trains collided on a single-track stretch of line between Hütteldorf and Penzing in Vienna's suburbs, injuring 41 people, five of them seriously.
- 21 January – Portugal – Alfarelos train crash – An InterCity train from Lisbon to Porto collided with a regional train it was supposed to overtake, after both trains failed to stop before a signal on red at Alfarelos, injuring 25.
- 23 January – Slovakia – An intercity train IC507 from Bratislava to Košice hit a snowplow vehicle near Liptovský Mikuláš, killing the train driver.
- 31 January – Australia – A passenger train overshot the railway line and collided with Cleveland railway station, severely damaging a toilet block and injuring 14 people.
- 31 January – South Africa – A moving passenger train slammed into the back of a stationary passenger train near Kalafong station near Pretoria, injuring up to 300 people, 28 of them seriously.
- 12 February – Japan – 15 people were injured after a Sanyo Electric Railway non-stop limited express train approaching Arai station rear-ended a lorry and derailed.
- 10 April – India – Seven compartments of the 15228 Muzaffarpur-Yeshvantpur Weekly Express derailed near Arakkonam, 40 km from Chennai, killing one passenger and leaving another seriously injured.
- 26 April – United States – At a rural Buffalo & Pittsburgh Railroad crossing, in Butler County, Pennsylvania (near Pittsburgh), an Allegheny Valley Railroad freight train carrying asphalt struck a bus at the Maple Street intersection. Two people were airlifted to hospital, one of which later died. Ten others, including the bus driver, were also hospitalised.
- 2 May – Serbia – A passenger train running in the same direction, one from Belgrade to Novi Sad, struck another passenger train running from Belgrade to Šid in a tunnel between Novi Beograd and Zemun, injuring 22.
- 3 May – Belgium – A freight train derailed in Wetteren near Ghent. Three wagons carrying acrylonitrile exploded. One person died and 49 were injured from toxic fumes. 500 were evacuated.
- 17 May – United States – Fairfield train crash – Sixty people were injured, five critically, after a Metro-North commuter train derailed and plowed into another train in Fairfield, Connecticut.
- 20 May – New Zealand – A Tranz Metro EMU commuter train derailed near central Wellington after part of the undercarriage came loose and punctured a hole in the carriage floor. Four people were injured.
- 25 May – United States – Seven people were injured after a Union Pacific train T-boned a BNSF train at an intersection in Rockview, Missouri, causing a highway overpass to collapse after a pillar was struck by rail cars.
- 28 May – United States – A freight train derailed outside Baltimore after colliding with a garbage truck, injuring the truck driver and causing an explosion that damaged nearby buildings.
- 4 June – Denmark – A train collided with a tractor close to a crossing near Holbæk, killing the tractor driver and injuring six train passengers.
- 13 June – Argentina – 2013 Castelar rail accident – A passenger train travelling hit an empty stationary train near Castelar station, in Buenos Aires Province, about 30 km (19 mi) from Buenos Aires, killing at least three people and injuring 315.
- 4 July – United States – In Oahu, Hawaii, two trains at Dole Plantation collided head-on, injuring five people.
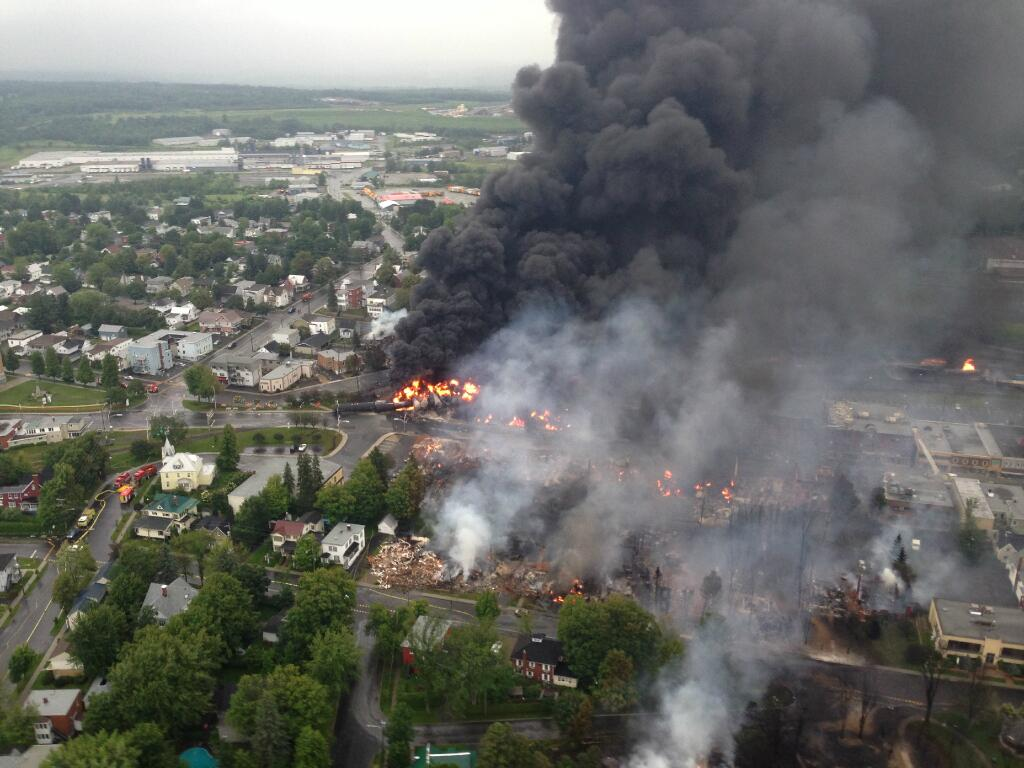
- Lac-Mégantic rail disaster
  6 July – Canada – Lac-Mégantic rail disaster – A Montreal, Maine and Atlantic Railway freight train containing 72 tank cars of crude oil ran away while unattended and derailed in Lac-Mégantic, Quebec. Several cars exploded, destroying over 30 buildings in the town's centre, roughly half of the downtown area, and requiring the demolition of all but three of the remainder of the buildings in the area due to contamination by petroleum from the train; these led to the evacuation of 2,000 people, a third of the town's population. 42 were killed, along with 5 missing and presumed dead, making this the fourth-deadliest rail accident in Canadian history, and the deadliest since Canadian Confederation in 1867.
- 7 July – Russia – At least 75 were injured after a train from Novosibirsk to Sochi derailed between Krylovskaya and Kislyakovka in Krasnodar Krai.
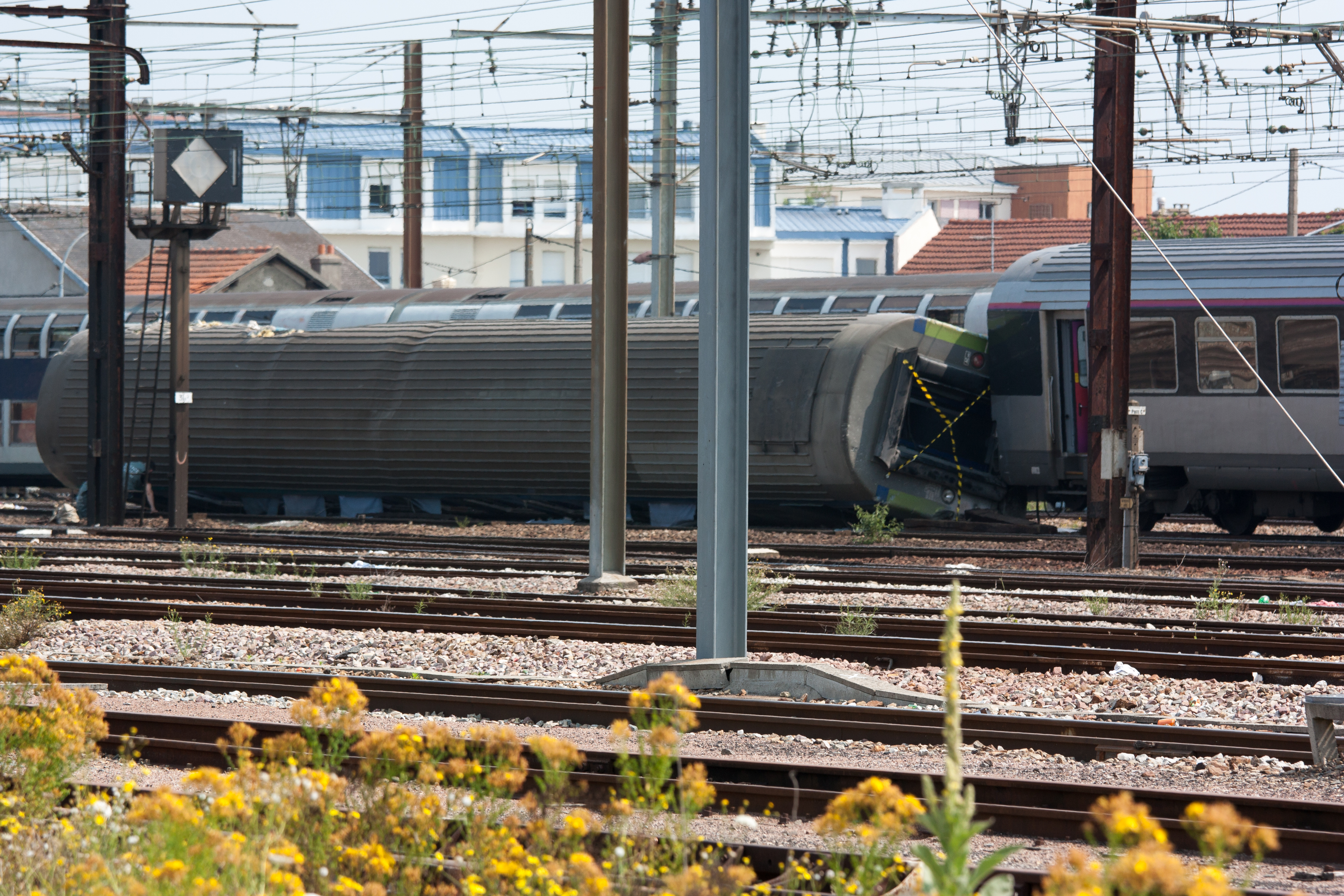
- Brétigny-sur-Orge train crash
  12 July – France – Brétigny-sur-Orge train crash – A passenger train was derailed by a track defect soon after leaving Paris and smashed into a station platform, killing six and injuring almost 200.
- 18 July
  - Sweden – Two Gothenburg Tram trains collided with each other at a curve, injuring eight.
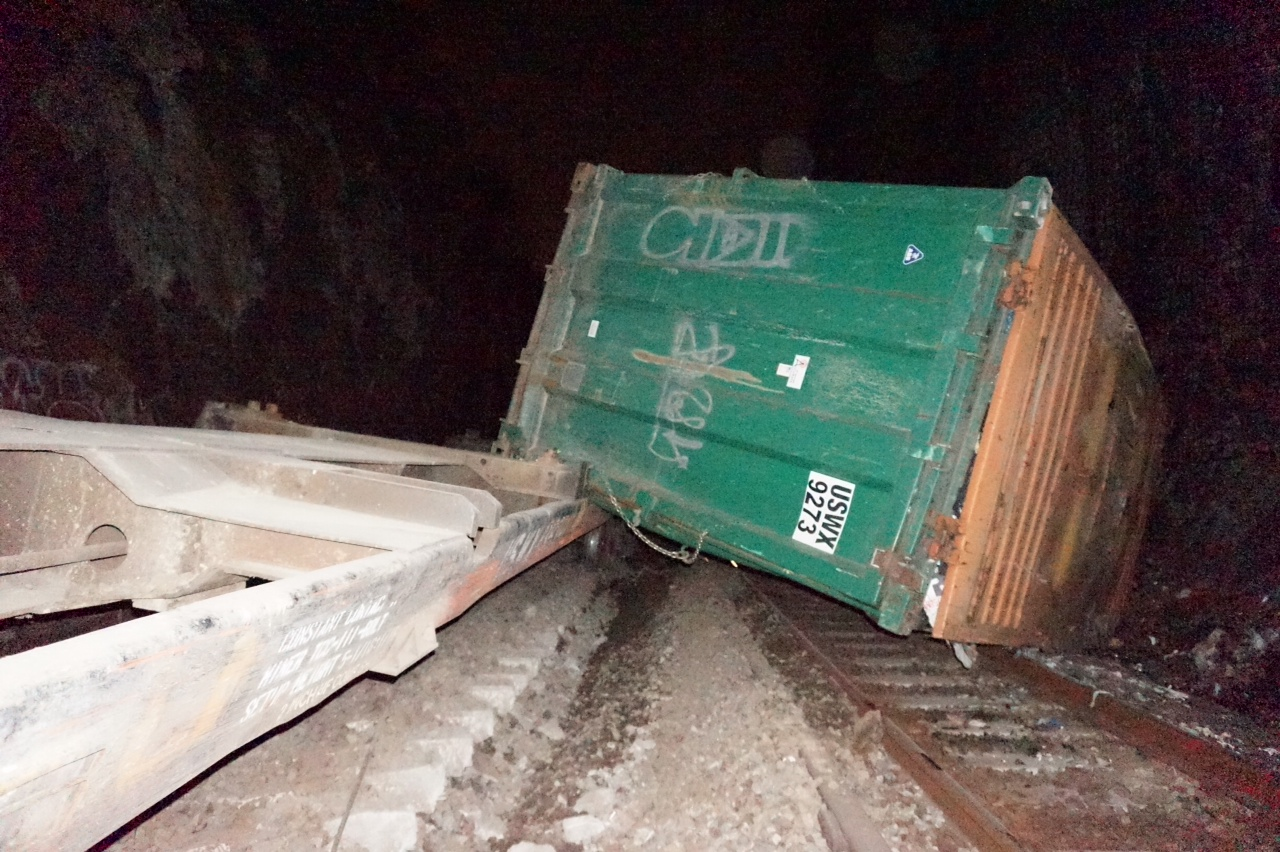
  - July 2013 Spuyten Duyvil derailment
    United States – July 2013 Spuyten Duyvil derailment: Nine freight cars derail on a busy commuter line in New York City, requiring nine days to completely clear.
- 21 July – United Kingdom – Two passenger trains collided at Norwich, injuring eight.
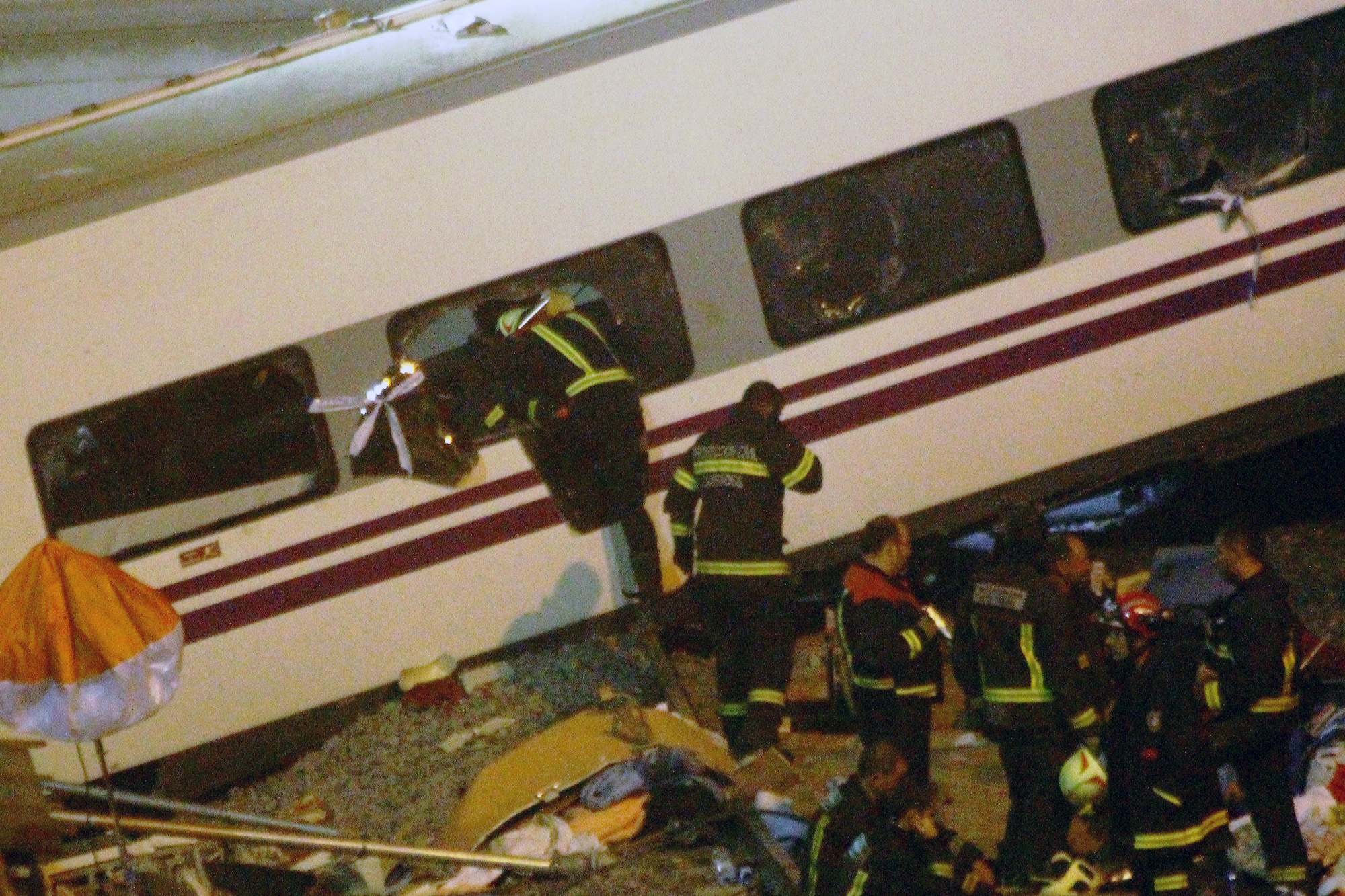
- Santiago de Compostela derailment
  24 July – Spain – Santiago de Compostela derailment – A high-speed train from Madrid to Ferrol, travelling at 190 km/h, well above the speed limit of 80 km/h, derailed on a curve in Santiago de Compostela, killing at least 79 passengers and injuring 140.
- 25 July – Pakistan – A passenger train travelling from Lahore to Rawalpindi derailed on a closed track in Gujranwala, Punjab, killing at least two people.
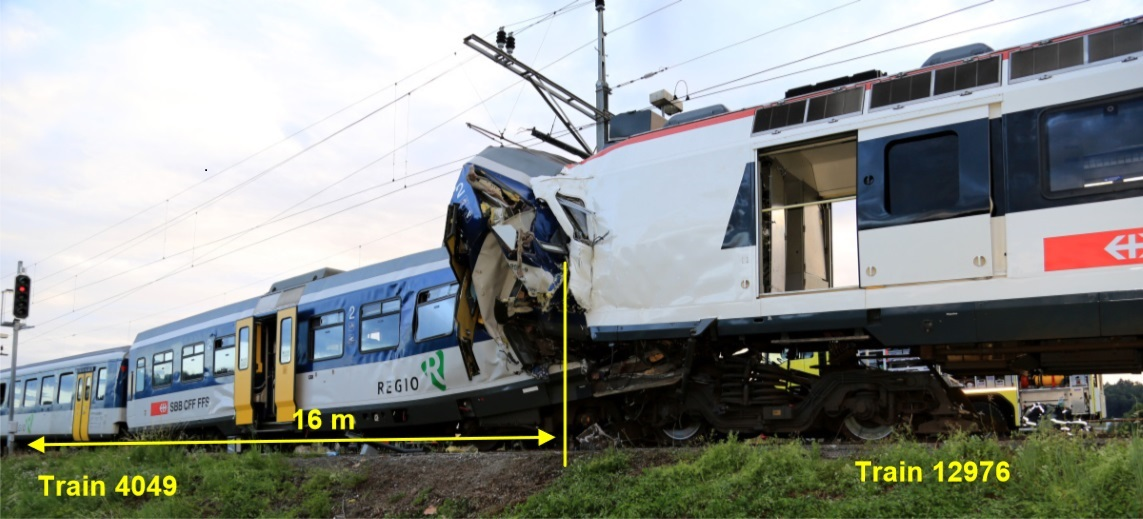
- Granges-près-Marnand train crash
  29 July – Switzerland – Granges-près-Marnand train crash – Two passenger trains collided between Moudon and Payerne, at Granges-près-Marnand, killing one person and injuring more than 40.
- 19 August – India – A high-speed Rajya Rani Express crashed into a crowd of Hindu pilgrims crossing the tracks at a remote station in the Saharsa District, killing 37 people.
- 25 August – Mexico – A cargo train ridden by Central American migrants heading to the U.S. derailed in Tabasco, killing at least five and injuring at least 35.
- 18 September – Canada – 2013 Ottawa bus–train crash – An OC Transpo double-decker bus collided with a Via Rail train in the Ottawa suburb of Barrhaven near Fallowfield Station, killing at least six bus passengers including the driver.
- 19 September – United States – A CSX train derailed in Southampton County, Virginia injuring two engineers and starting a fire.
- 25 September – United States – An empty BNSF intermodal train rear-ended another BNSF train, causing multiple empty intermodal cars to block the adjacent track which derailed a third BNSF train subsequently injuring 4 crew members in Amarillo, Texas.
- 30 September – United States – An out-of-service Chicago Transit Authority train crashed head-on into a stopped train in Forest Park, Illinois, injuring 33.
- 9 October – United States – A Union Pacific train hit a stalled tractor trailer carrying pipes in Odessa, Texas, causing the pipes to go flying and 100 US gallons (380 L) of diesel fuel from the locomotive to leak.
- 11 October – United States – A truck collided with a Durbin and Greenbrier Valley Railroad train carrying 63 people in Randolph County, West Virginia. The truck driver died and 23 train passengers were injured, six of them seriously.
- 19 October – Canada – A train with 13 cars carrying crude oil and liquefied petroleum gas derailed in Gainford, Alberta,85 km (53 mi) west of Edmonton causing a fire and evacuations.
- 19 October – Argentina – 2013 Buenos Aires train crash – At least 80 people were injured after a train crashed into a walk in the center of Buenos Aires.
- 21 October – United States – An inbound Metra Milwaukee West Line train collided with a stalled vehicle-hauling truck before arriving at Metra's station in Bartlett, Illinois, injuring two.
- 23 October – United States – A train collided onto a car killing YouTuber Yoteslaya.
- 24 October – United States – One person died after four freight cars loaded with gravel derailed at the SunRail station on State Road 46 in Sanford, Florida.
- 31 October – Kenya – At least 11 people died and 34 others were injured in Nairobi after a passenger train ran into a bus.
- 2 November – India – 10 people died and 20 were injured after being run over by the 13352 Alapuzha-Dhanbad express in Vizianagaram district. The victims had alighted from the 57271 Vijayawada-Rayagada train onto the tracks at Gotlam station when they heard a rumour that a compartment was on fire and failed to see the train coming.
- 8 November – United States – A train carrying crude oil from North Dakota's Bakken shale formation derailed and caught fire in western Alabama, spilling nearly 750,000 US gallons (2,800,000 L; 620,000 imp gal) of its 2 million-US gallon (7,570,800 L) load of crude in wetlands a half-mile (800 m) south of Aliceville in Pickens County. The amount of crude spilled was almost as much oil as was spilled by U.S. railroads from 1975 to 2012, according to an analysis by the McClatchy news organization—a total of 800,000 US gallons (3,000,000 L; 670,000 imp gal) over the 37-year period, making it the largest rail-related U.S. oil spill in 2013.
- 15 November – India – 13 Coaches of Ernakulam-bound 12618 Mangala Lakshadweep Superfast Express derailed near Ghoti village, killing 3 to 4 people.
- 20 November – United Kingdom – A passenger train collided with the buffers at Chester railway station, Cheshire, injuring one passenger.
- 25 November – United States – Amtrak Crescent #20 with 218 passengers and crew en route from New Orleans, LA to New York, NY derailed in a rural area 6 miles (9.7 km) south of Spartanburg, SC. 4 minor injuries were reported.
- 30 November – United States – A Southwestern Railroad (New Mexico) train derailed outside Silver City, New Mexico, resulting in the deaths of the conductor, engineer, and a ride-along passenger.
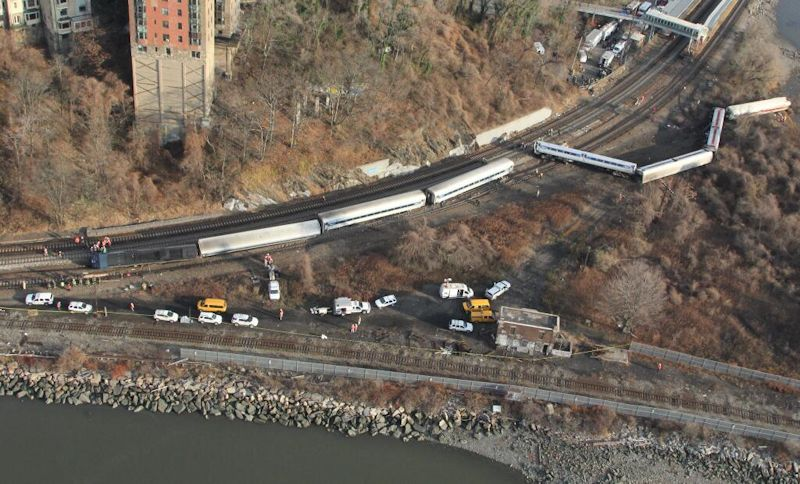
- Spuyten Duyvil derailment
  1 December – United States – December 2013 Spuyten Duyvil derailment – A Metro-North Railroad passenger train from Poughkeepsie to Grand Central Terminal derailed before Spuyten Duyvil station, near where the freight had derailed in July, after its engineer fell asleep, killing four and injuring 63.
- 9 December – Indonesia – 2013 Bintaro train crash – A commuter line train bound for Tanah Abang from Maja collided with a truck loaded with oil, which exploded. Five people died; another was seriously injured.
- 22 December – Kenya – A cargo train derailed in the Nairobi slum of Kibera, injuring several people.
- 28 December – India – At least 26 died and 12 were injured after an AC coach of the 16594 Bangalore City-Hazur Sahib Nanded express caught fire near Kothacheruvu in Anantapur district of Andhra Pradesh.
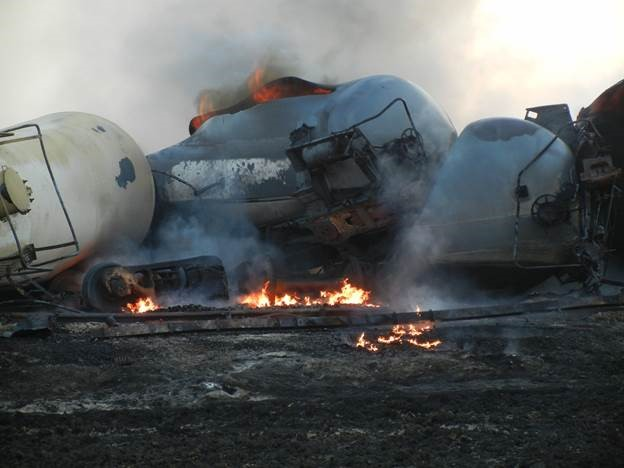
- Taken 31 December 2013, shows aftermath of train collision near Casselton, ND. The DOT-111 tank car sustained a thermal tear.
  30 December – United States – Casselton train derailment – Several cars from westbound BNSF grain train 6990 derailed after a reused axle broke on the 45th car. Shortly after, eastbound crude oil train 4934, operating on the adjacent eastbound track near Casselton, North Dakota, struck the derailed grain car, derailing locomotive 4934 and several of the oil tank cars, which caught fire and exploded, generating large clouds of black smoke which forced an evacuation of the area.

== 2014 ==
- 7 January – Canada – A CN train carrying crude oil and propane derailed near Plaster Rock, New Brunswick. The resulting fire forced evacuations within a two-kilometre radius.
- 11 January – Canada – A CP train carrying metallurgic coal derailed and spilled coal into a fish-bearing stream in Burnaby, British Columbia.
- 21 January – Netherlands – An empty, out-of-service tram/LRT vehicle of HTM's Randstadrail service crashed into an in-service tram/LRT Randstadrail vehicle at a tram stop, injuring four passengers.
- 28 January – United States – A CSX train carrying phosphoric acid derailed near McDavid, Florida, resulting in the destruction of the tracks and bridge over Fletcher Creek, and chemicals leaking into the water.
- 31 January – United States – A CN train carrying crude oil, methane and liquid fertilizer derailed and leaked near New Augusta, Mississippi. 12 families were evacuated.
- 8 February – France – Annot derailment – A train derailed between Digne-les-Bains and Nice after being hit by a falling rock, killing two people and injuring seven.
- 15 February – Japan – Two commuter trains, operating in heavy snow and limited vision, bound for Yokohama Motomachi, collided. A subsequent two-car train derailed in Motosumiyoshi Station, Tokyu Toyoko Line, in Kawasaki, Kanagawa. 19 were injured.
- 20 February – United States – In Doctortown, Georgia, during the filming of Midnight Rider, an actress was hit and killed and another injured by a CSX Train at a trestle.
- 17 March – Netherlands – A passenger train from Syntus crashed into a truck that got stuck at a crossing near Almen. The truck driver escaped while three train passengers are injured.
- 17 March – Netherlands – A tram/LRT vehicle of HTM's Randstadrail service crashed into a city tram on an intersection near the city's border with Delft. 20 people were injured, one of them severely.
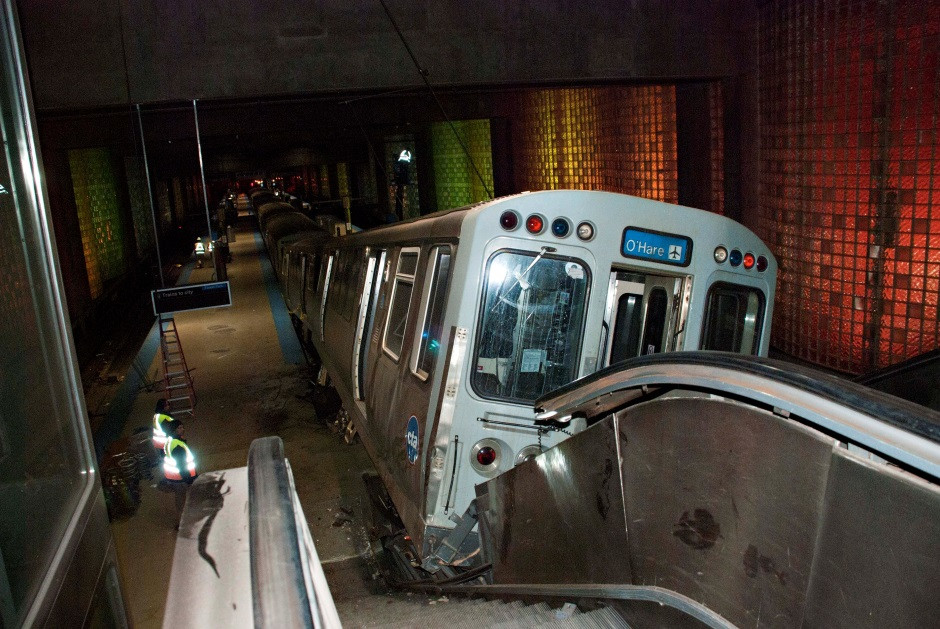
- O'Hare station train crash
  24 March – United States – O'Hare station train crash – A CTA train in Chicago, Illinois overran the buffers and ascended the escalator at O'Hare International Airport, injuring 32 people.
- 4 April – Indonesia – Tasikmalaya derailment – The Kereta Api Indonesia passenger train Malabar derailed after being struck by a landslide, killing three and injuring 35.
- 13 April – China – 15 people were hospitalized after a passenger train derailed in Heilongjiang.
- 16 April – Estonia – A truck crashed into Elron's train Stadler Flirt at Raasiku crossing. The truck driver and one passenger were killed and 12 others were injured.
- 22 April – Democratic Republic of the Congo – 2014 Katanga train derailment – More than 48 killed.
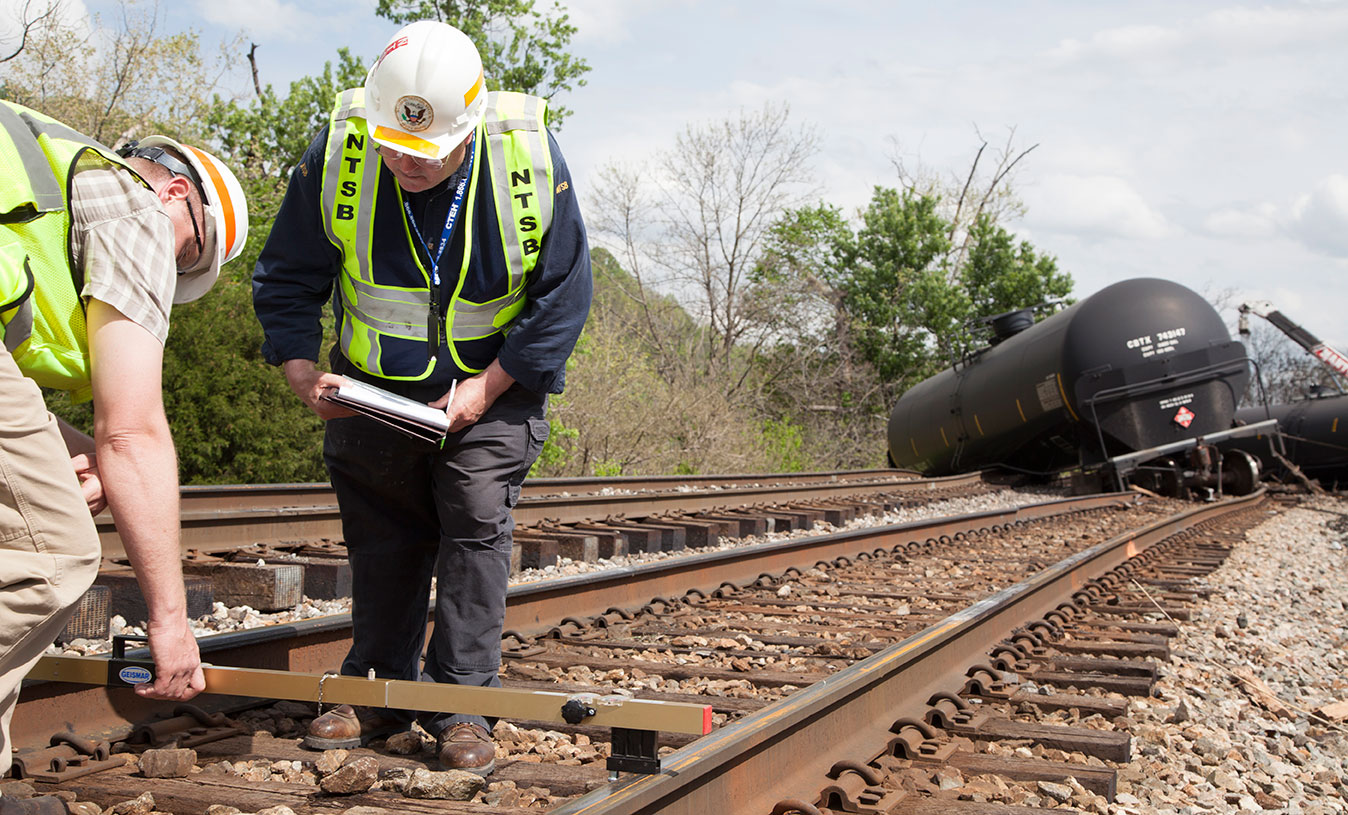
- NTSB investigators at the scene of the Lynchburg, Virginia oil tanker derailment
  30 April – United States – CSX derailment: 15 tankers carrying crude oil derailed and caught fire in Lynchburg, Virginia.
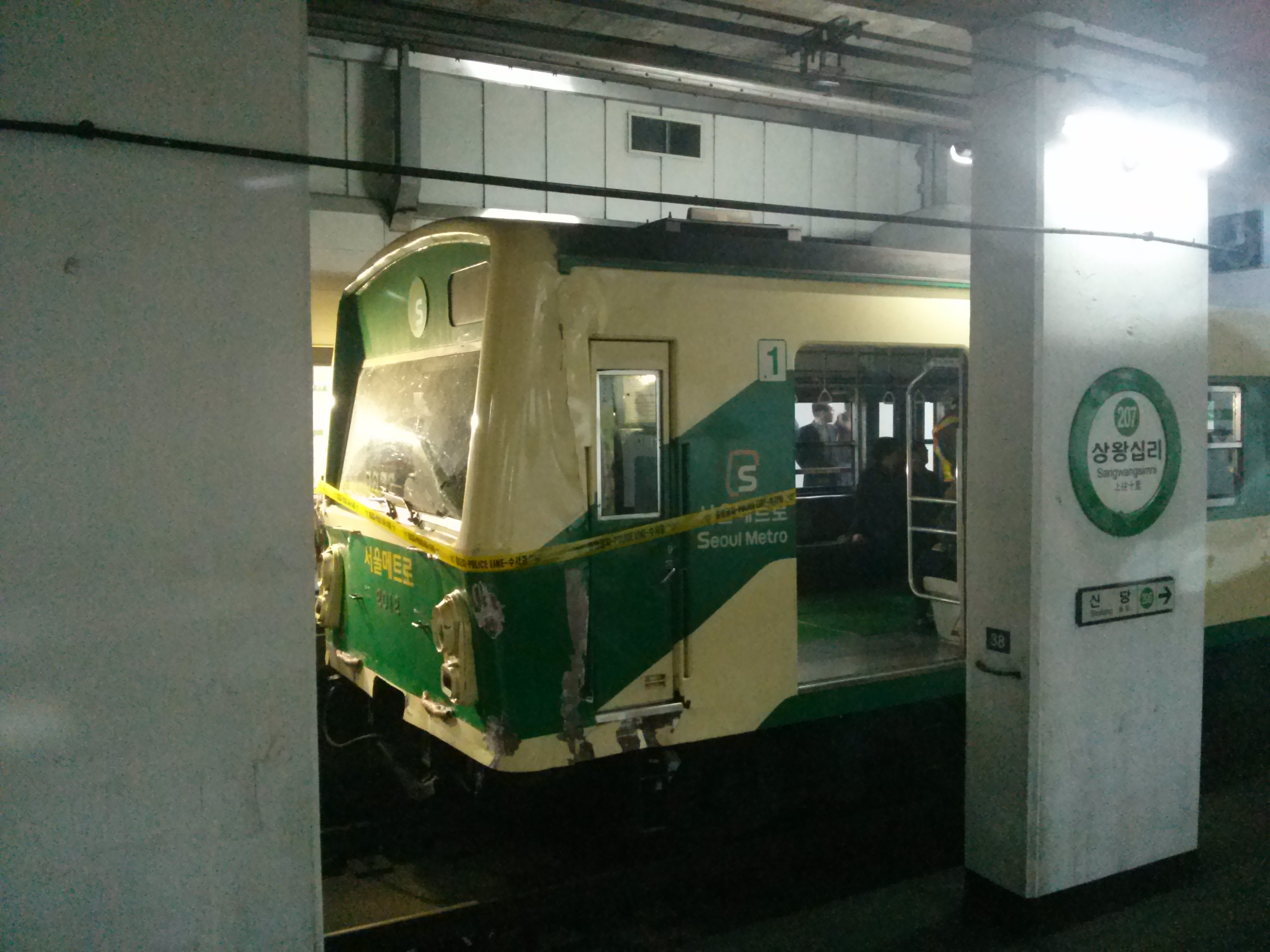
- Seoul
  2 May – South Korea – 2014 Seoul subway crash – A Seoul Metro train collided with another train due to ATS failure while stopping at Sangwangsimni Station. 388 were injured, of them 24 severely.
- 4 May – India – A train traveling the Konkan Railway derailed near Nidi railway station in Maharashtra, killing at least 18 and injuring 124.
- 20 May – Russia – Naro-Fominsk rail crash – Near Naro-Fominsk, a freight train derailed and entered an adjacent line. A passenger train then ran into it, killing nine and injuring around 50.
- 26 May – India – 2014 Khalilabad derailment – Gorakhpur bound Gorakhdham Express rammed into a stationary goods train near Khalilabad station in Sant Kabir Nagar district of Uttar Pradesh killing at least 25 and injuring over 50.
- 5 June – Iran – A passenger train collided with a freight train in the north of the country, killing ten people.
- 25 June – India – Dibrugarh Rajdhani Express (12236) derailed near Chapra, Bihar, killing four and injuring eight.
- 4 July – United States – 19 cars of a Montana Rail Link train, carrying manufactured plane parts, soybeans, and alcohol from Kansas City, Kansas to Renton, Washington derailed. Three airplane fuselages spilled into a river.
- 12 July – Bulgaria – A long-distance passenger train derailed at Kaloyanovets station, killing the driver and injuring 14 others.
- 15 July – Russia – 2014 Moscow Metro derailment – A passenger train derailed between Slavyansky Bulvar and Park Pobedy stations on the Moscow Metro, killing 21 people and injuring over 150.
- 17 July – France – Denguin rail crash – A TGV train collided with a regional TER train near Denguin.
- 24 July – India – Medak district bus-train collision – A school bus was hit by Nanded Passenger train at an unmanned level crossing in Masaipet village of Medak district. 18 bus passengers died including 16 students.
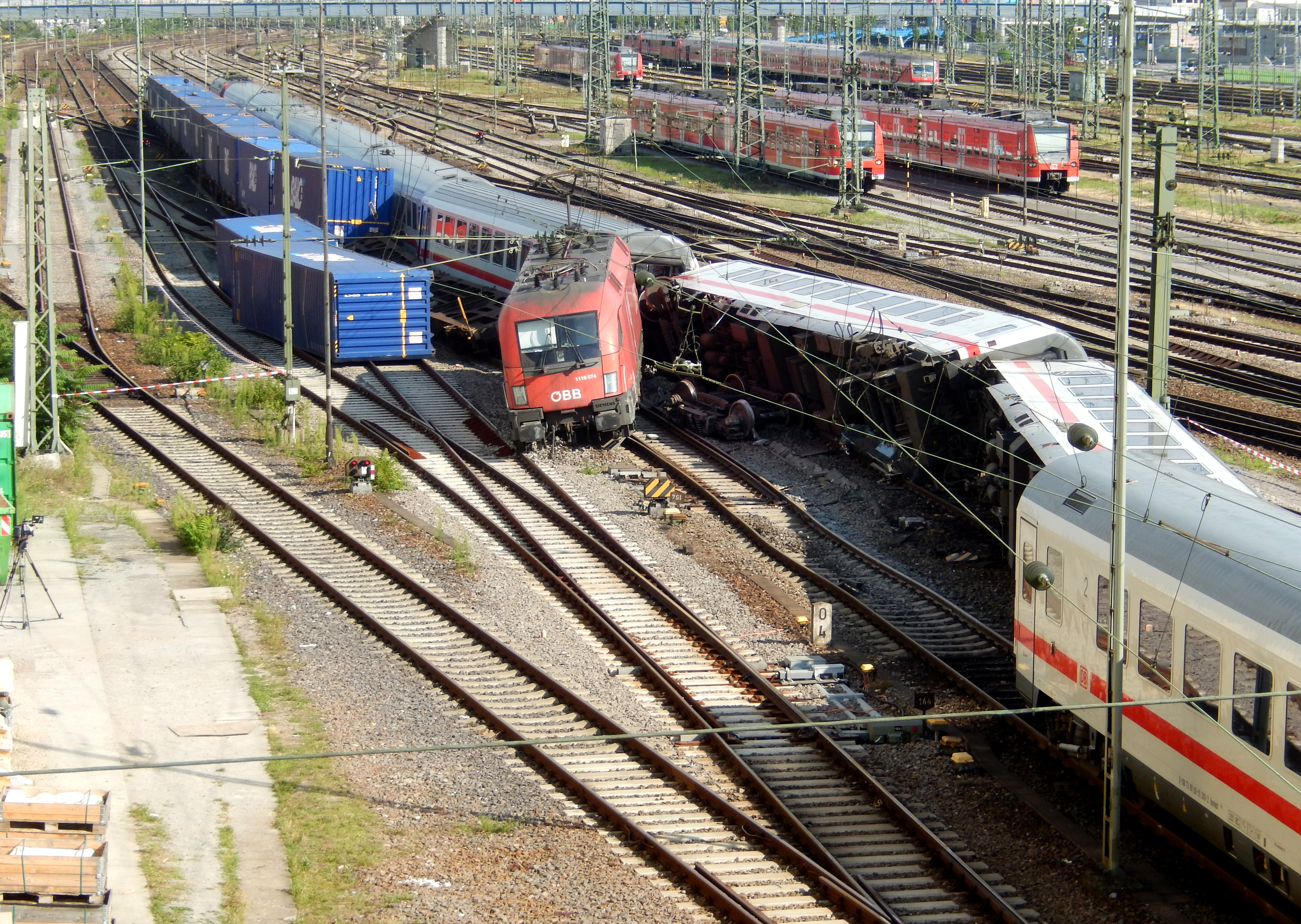
- Mannheim
  2 August – Germany – A EuroCity express train of Deutsche Bahn collided with a freight train in the Mannheim Hauptbahnhof. 45 were injured, five of them severely.
- 13 August
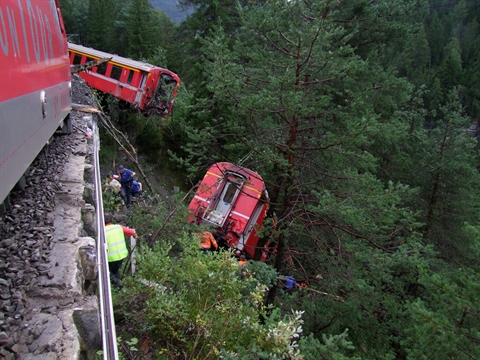
  - Tiefencastel, Switzerland
    Switzerland – Tiefencastel derailment – A Rhaetian Railway passenger train was struck by a landslide and derailed at Tiefencastel, injuring 11.
  - Philippines – A RT8D5M LRV heading to Taft Avenue station went past its barrier, injuring several passengers and causing a post to fall over a car.
- 17 August – United States – Two Union Pacific locomotives hit head-on, in Hoxie, Arkansas, killing two crewmen and injuring two others. Several cars derail, resulting in a fire that causes the evacuation of 500 residents.
- 22 August – Australia – A V/line V/locity ran into a Metro Trains Comeng from Werribee to Flinders Street between former stations Galvin and Paisley on the express section of the Werribee line, injuring nine.
- 30 September – India – The Lucknow–Barauni Express was rear-ended near Gorakhpur by the Krishak Express, killing at least 12 and injuring 46, 12 critically.
- 5 October – United States – a Norfolk Southern freight train slammed into a lowboy trailer in Mer Rouge, LA, seriously injuring both railroad crew and causing two engines along with 17 cars to derail. 50 homes were evacuated due to the leakage of argon gas from the tank car.
- 7 October – Canada – A CN train hauling dangerous goods derailed near Clair, Saskatchewan. Two cars leaked petroleum distillate and caught fire. The approximately 50 residences of Clair and surrounding farms were evacuated.
- 16 October – United States – An excursion train of the Arkansas-Missouri Railroad stalled on the mainline near West Fork, Arkansas; the crew of the locomotive sent to help the train did not have its precise location and ran into the stalled train's locomotive after rounding a curve. 44 people were injured, five critically.
- 28 October – United States – 24 were injured after an Amtrak train collided with a semi truck on U.S. Route 421 near Reynolds, Indiana.
- 6 November – Canada – A QNSL train hit a landslide, causing the lead locomotives to derail and fall down an embankment into a river near Sept-Îles, Quebec. The engineer was killed.

== 2015 ==
- 7 January – Canada – A CN freight train hauling 114 cars heading east from Edmonton to Saskatoon derailed between the community of Jarrow, Alberta and the village of Irma. One derailed car discharged a non-dangerous liquid adhesive, prompting the temporary closure of a section of Highway 14.
- 14 January – United States – A Texas Department of Criminal Justice bus with 12 inmates and three officers collided with a train, near Odessa, Texas, killing 10.
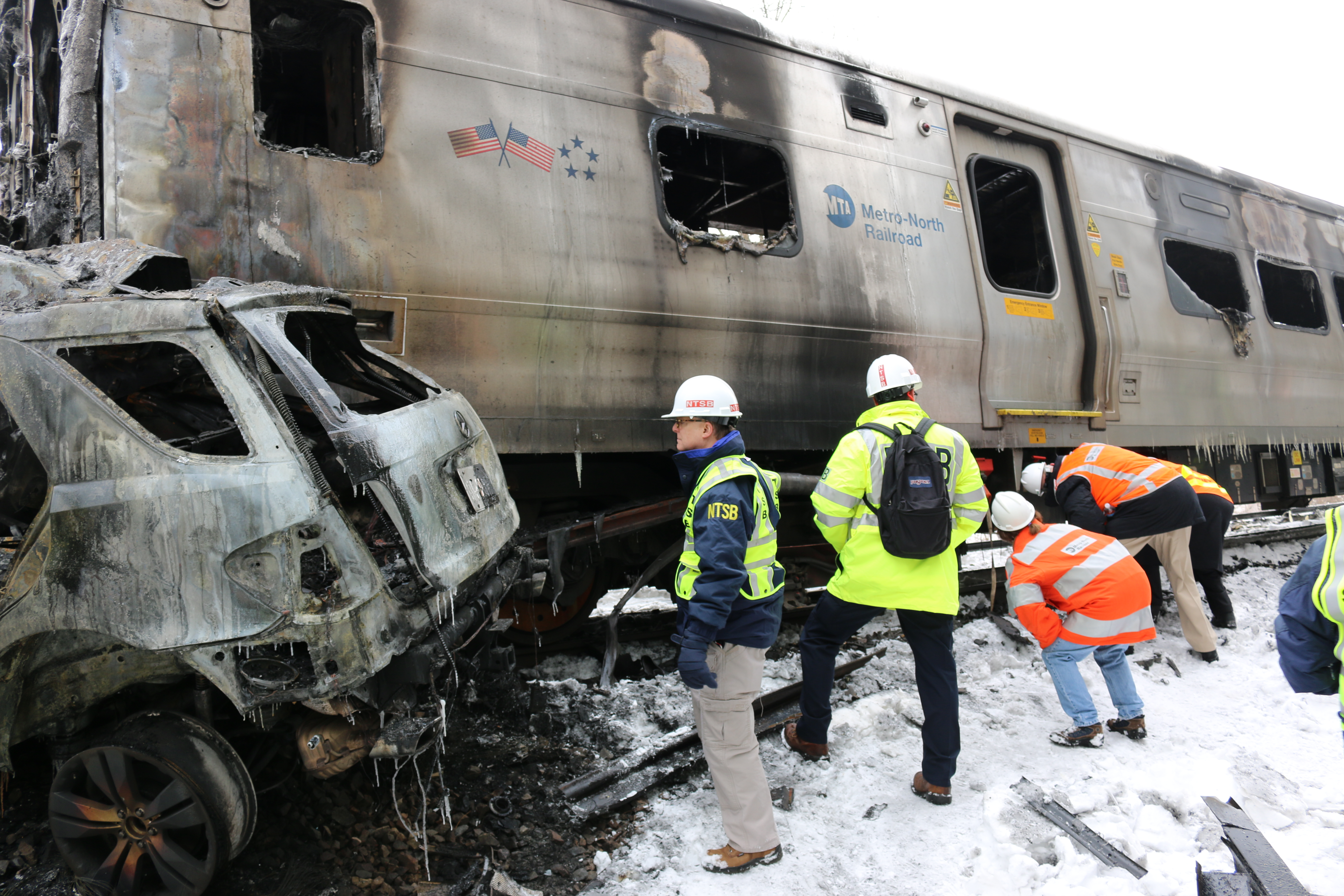
- Valhalla, New York
  3 February – United States – Valhalla train crash: A Metro-North Railroad train struck a Mercedes-Benz SUV at a crossing near Valhalla, New York, and caught fire, killing six people.
- 13 February – India – Anekal derailment: Derailment of an Intercity Express in Bangalore, killed ten and injured 150.
- 16 February – Canada – A CN freight train transporting crude oil derailed 80 km south of Timmins, Ontario, with seven crude oil tank cars catching fire.
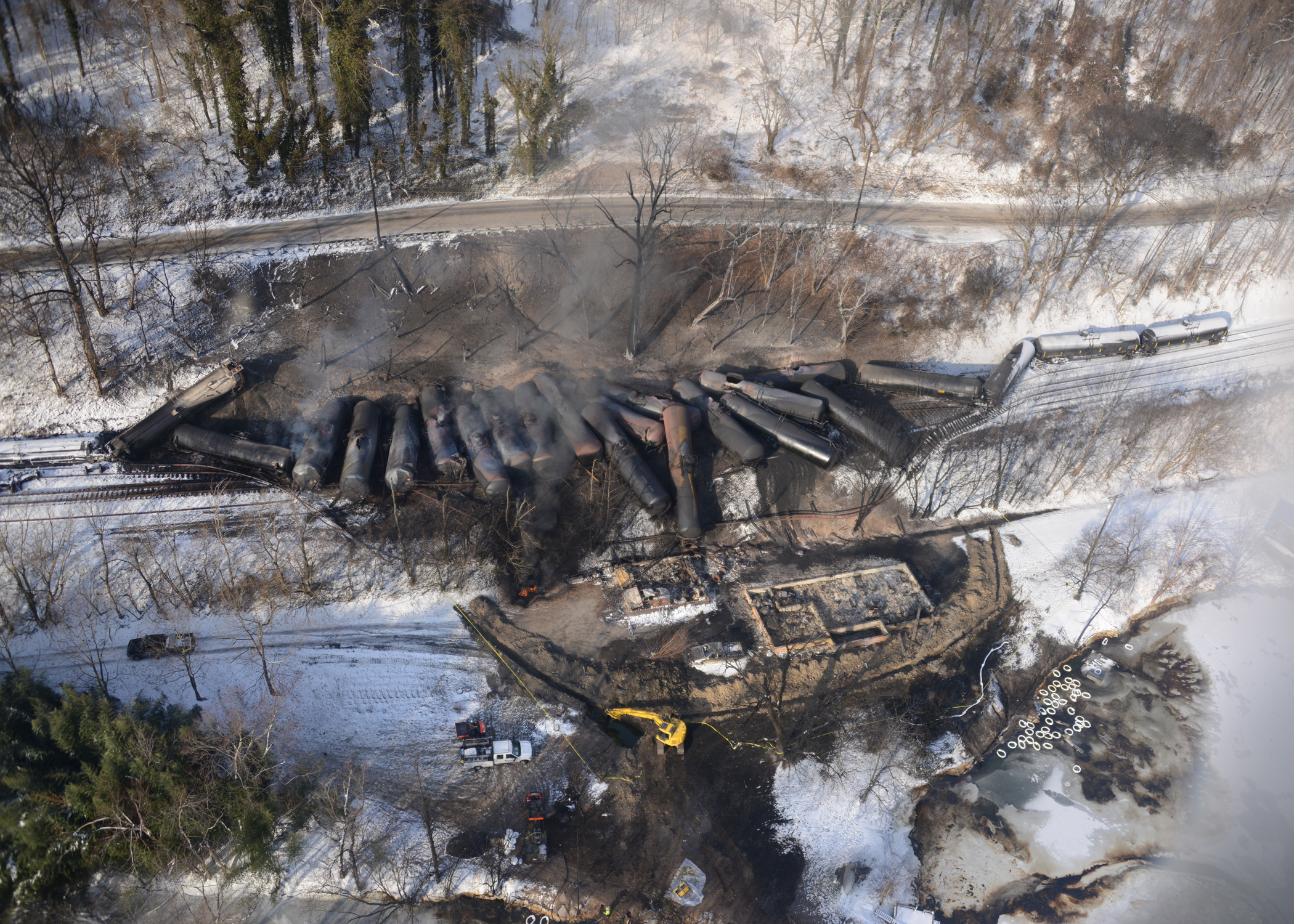
- Mount Carbon
  16 February – United States – 2015 Mount Carbon train derailment – A CSX freight train derailed in West Virginia due to a broken rail, causing nineteen Bakken crude oil tank cars to catch fire and forcing the evacuation of 1,100 residents.
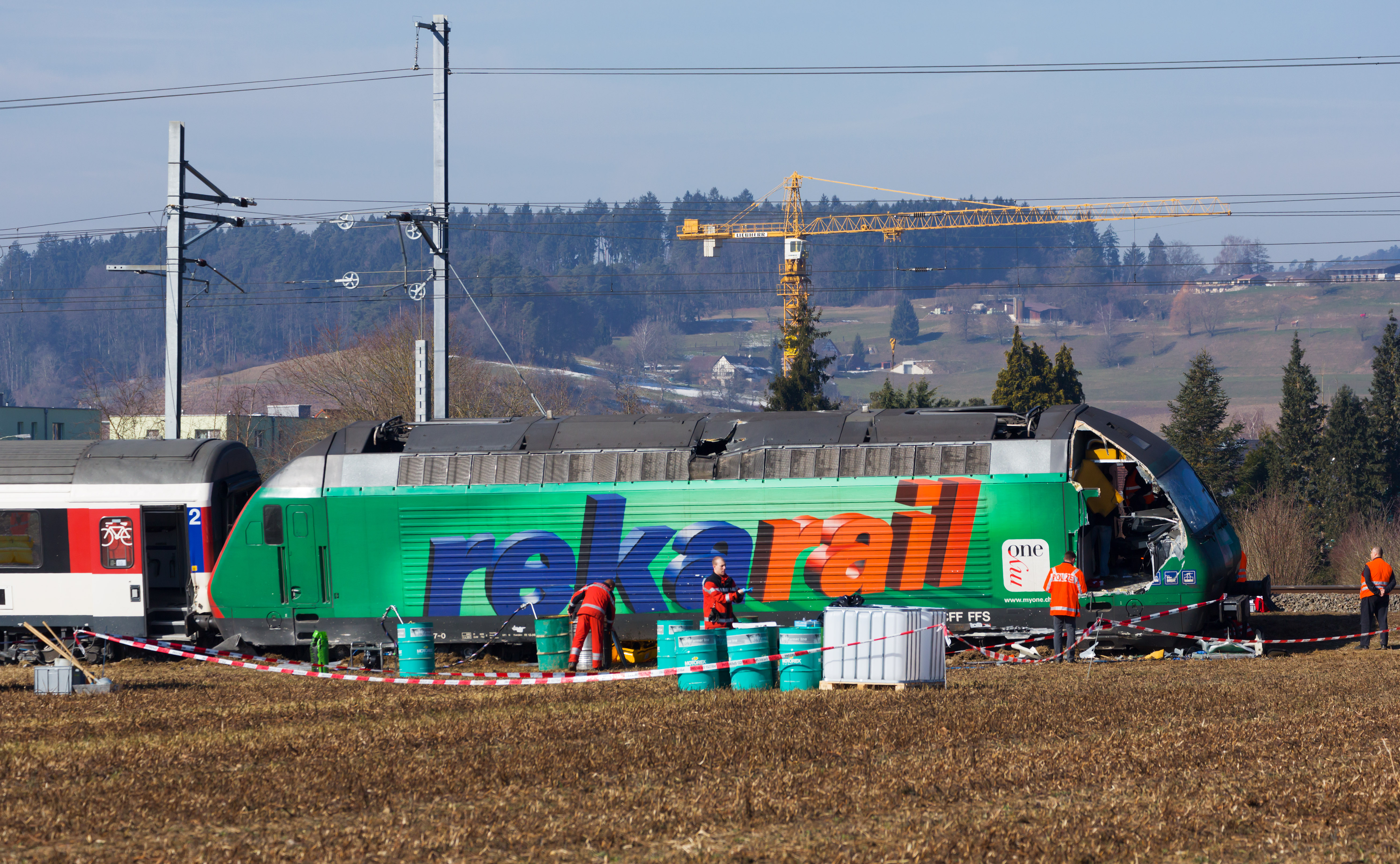
- Rafz
  20 February – Switzerland – Rafz train crash: An S-Bahn train and an Interregio express train collided at Rafz.
- 24 February – United States – 2015 Oxnard train derailment: A Metrolink train hit a vehicle at Oxnard, California and derailed, killing the train engineer and injuring 29 others.
- 5 March – United States – A BNSF oil train derailed in a rural area near Galena, Illinois, with 21 cars containing Bakken formation crude oil catching fire.
- 6 March – Netherlands – A passenger train rear-ended a freight train between Tilburg Universiteit and Tilburg stations. A few passengers suffered slight injuries.
- 7 March – Canada – A CN freight train derailed near the small village of Gogama, Ontario. Five cars entered the Makami River and seven carrying crude oil caught fire and burned for several days.
- 9 March – United States – At around 12:19 EST Amtrak's Carolinian smashed into a semi carrying an oversized load that was obstructing the track at a grade crossing in Halifax, North Carolina, causing the engine and a baggage car to derail. No one was killed, but 55 people were injured. The crash was captured on camera by a witness.
- 15 March – United States – A car ignored warning signals at an open grade crossing in Louisville, Kentucky and was struck by Norfolk Southern freight train with leased locomotives from Union Pacific Railroad, killing two passengers and critically injuring two others.
- 20 March – India – 2015 Uttar Pradesh train accident: 15 people were killed and 150 were injured after the Dehradun-Varanasi Janta Express derailed in Rae Bareli, Uttar Pradesh.
- 26 March – Thailand – 2015 Phachi collision – A passenger train rear-ended another train in Phachi District. 52 people were injured, three seriously.
- 28 March – United States – 2015 Los Angeles train crash: An Expo Line train collided with an automobile at an intersection, injuring 12.
- 28 April – South Africa – Johannesburg train crash: Two passenger trains collided at Denver station, near Johannesburg, killing one person and injuring about 240.
- 28 April – United States – In Roswell, New Mexico, two BNSF trains collided into each other, killing one person and injuring another.
- 4 May – Mexico – In Mexico City, two Metro trains on Line 5 collided at Oceanía station, injuring 12 people.
- 5 May – Austria – Two passenger trains collided in Graz, killing one of the drivers; eight passengers were injured.
- 6 May – United States – A BNSF train derailed near Heimdal, North Dakota, igniting a crude oil fire in six tanker cars and forcing the evacuation of approximately 40 residents.
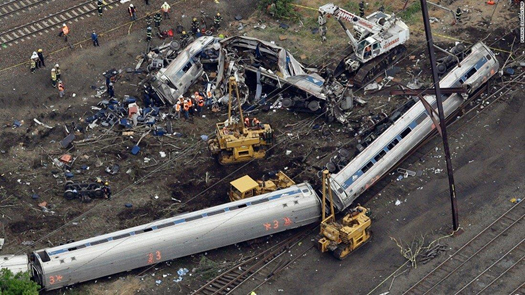
- 2015 Philadelphia train derailment
  12 May – United States – 2015 Philadelphia train derailment: Amtrak Northeast Regional No. 188 traveling from Washington, D.C. to New York City derailed at high speed while negotiating a curve at Philadelphia, killing eight people and injuring more than 200.
- 13 May – United States – A CSX freight train collided with a MARTA bus in East Point, Georgia that was trapped on a railroad crossing by traffic while stopped at a traffic light, injuring six.
- 16 May – Germany – Ibbenbüren train collision: A passenger train collided with an agricultural vehicle on a level crossing at Ibbenbüren, North Rhine-Westphalia, killing two and injuring 20.
- 25 May – India – An express train derailed between Athsarai and Sirathu stations in Uttar Pradesh, killing two and injuring over 100.
- 30 May – United Kingdom – Two electric multiple units collided at Cambridge at low speed while coupling, injuring three.
- 16 June – Tunisia – 2015 El Fahs train accident: 19 people were killed and 98 injured after a rush hour passenger train hit a lorry and derailed at an unmarked crossing in El Fahs, around 60 kilometres south of Tunis.
- 28 June – India – An electric multiple unit overran the buffers at Churchgate, Mumbai, injuring five.
- 2 July – United States – Maryville, Tennessee train derailment: A CSX train carrying hazardous materials derailed near Knoxville, Tennessee. Over 5,000 residents were displaced within a two-mile (three kilometer) radius.
- 2 July – Pakistan – 2015 Gujranwala derailment: A Pakistan Army passenger train derailed after a bridge over a canal collapsed under it at Gujranwala, killing 19.
- 15 July – United States – In Sandersville, Georgia, two Norfolk Southern trains collided onto each other, injuring four.
- 17 July – South Africa – Two passenger trains collided at Booysens, Johannesburg, injuring over 100.
- 22 July – Czech Republic – 2015 Studénka train crash: Czech Railways passenger train SC 512, a ČD Class 680, hit a truck at a crossing near Studénka railway station, killing three people and injuring 13.
- 4 August – India – Harda twin train derailment: Two passenger trains derailed near Kudawa, Madhya Pradesh due to the trackbed being washed away by the Machak River, killing 29.
- 8 August – Russia – Four railcars of Passenger train number 233 en route from Yekaterinburg to Adler, Krasnodar Krai derailed in Mordovia, injuring five passengers.
- 12 September – Germany – A passenger train collided with a car in Monzingen, killing the five occupants of the car.
- 12 September – India – A passenger train derailed on the Kalka-Shimla Railway killing two and injuring nine.
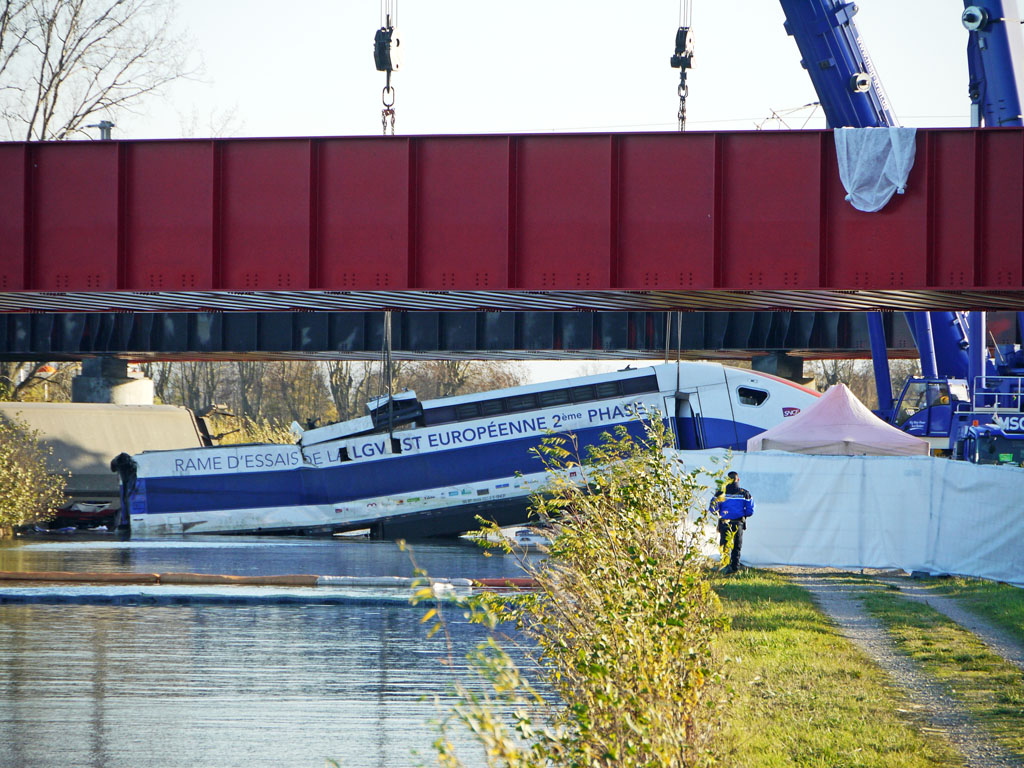
- Eckwersheim
  14 November – France – Eckwersheim train crash – A high-speed TGV test train derailed near Eckwersheim, north of Strasbourg, killing eleven people.
- 14 November – United States – A Norfolk Southern freight train collided with a Toyota Camry in Morrisville, North Carolina, near Cary, killing the two elderly passengers of the vehicle.
- 17 November – Pakistan – Aab-e-Gum derailment – The Jaffar Express derailed at Aab-e-Gum, killing 20 people and injuring 96.
- 1 December – Austria – A freight train on the Semmering railway line collided with a single locomotive that had been ordered to tow the train back into a station when it had to stop on the track because another train ahead had broken down. The engineer in the assistant locomotive was injured.
- 27 December – Australia – A freight train carrying 819,000 litres of sulphuric acid derailed about 20 kilometres (12 mi) east of Julia Creek, Queensland, leaking up to 31,500 litres of sulphuric acid.

== 2016 ==
- 4 January – United States – A Tri-Rail passenger train derailed after colliding with a broken-down garbage truck at a grade crossing at Lake Worth Beach station, Florida, injuring 22.
- 8 January – Thailand – A passenger train derailed after colliding with a cattle truck near Phetchaburi Railway Station, killing three and injuring 34.
- 10 January – Bangladesh – A passenger train derailed at Narsingdi killing two people and injuring ten.
- 12 January – Philippines – A PNR Metro South Commuter Line train from Alabang collided with a jeepney at the Pedro Gil Street crossing near Paco station in Manila, killing one person and injuring six.
- 15 January – United States – In Washington D.C., a Yellow Line (Washington Metro) had a broke down in the Northbound Tunnel at L'Enfant Plaza station. Smoke was filling up one train car which spread all the way to the station, 1 person was killed and dozens were injured.
- 20 January – Italy – A head-on crash between 2 light rail trains in Cagliari injured 70 passengers, mostly students from a nearby school.
- 28 January – United States – A southbound Tri-Rail train derailed in Pompano Beach, Florida, injuring one person.
- 31 January – Egypt – Seven were killed and scores injured after a train crashed into a truck in Giza. Reports said the gatekeeper forgot about the coming passenger train until a truck pulled out in front of the crossing.
- 5 February -India – Four coaches of Kanyakumari-Bangalore City Express derailed near Vellore, injuring a few.
- 9 February – Germany – Bad Aibling rail accident: Eleven people were killed in a head-on collision between two passenger trains near Bad Aibling; investigators attributed it to the dispatcher giving the trains incorrect information while he was distracted by a game he was playing on his mobile phone.
- 21 February – Switzerland – a steam railcar collided with wagons at Sihlbrugg. Sixteen people were injured, while 40 suffered from shock.
- 23 February – Netherlands – Dalfsen train crash: A passenger train collided with a crane at Dalfsen, Overijssel killing one person and injuring six.
- 7 March – United States – An Altamont Corridor Express train derailed after striking a fallen tree in Niles Canyon near Sunol, California. The lead car fell into Alameda Creek. 14 people were injured, four seriously.
- 11 March – Singapore – Pasir Ris rail accident: a train collided with two maintenance workers investigating a track point fault. Both workers were killed.
- 14 March – United States – Cimarron train derailment; Amtrak's Southwest Chief derailed about 20 miles (32 km) west of Dodge City in Kansas; injuring 32.
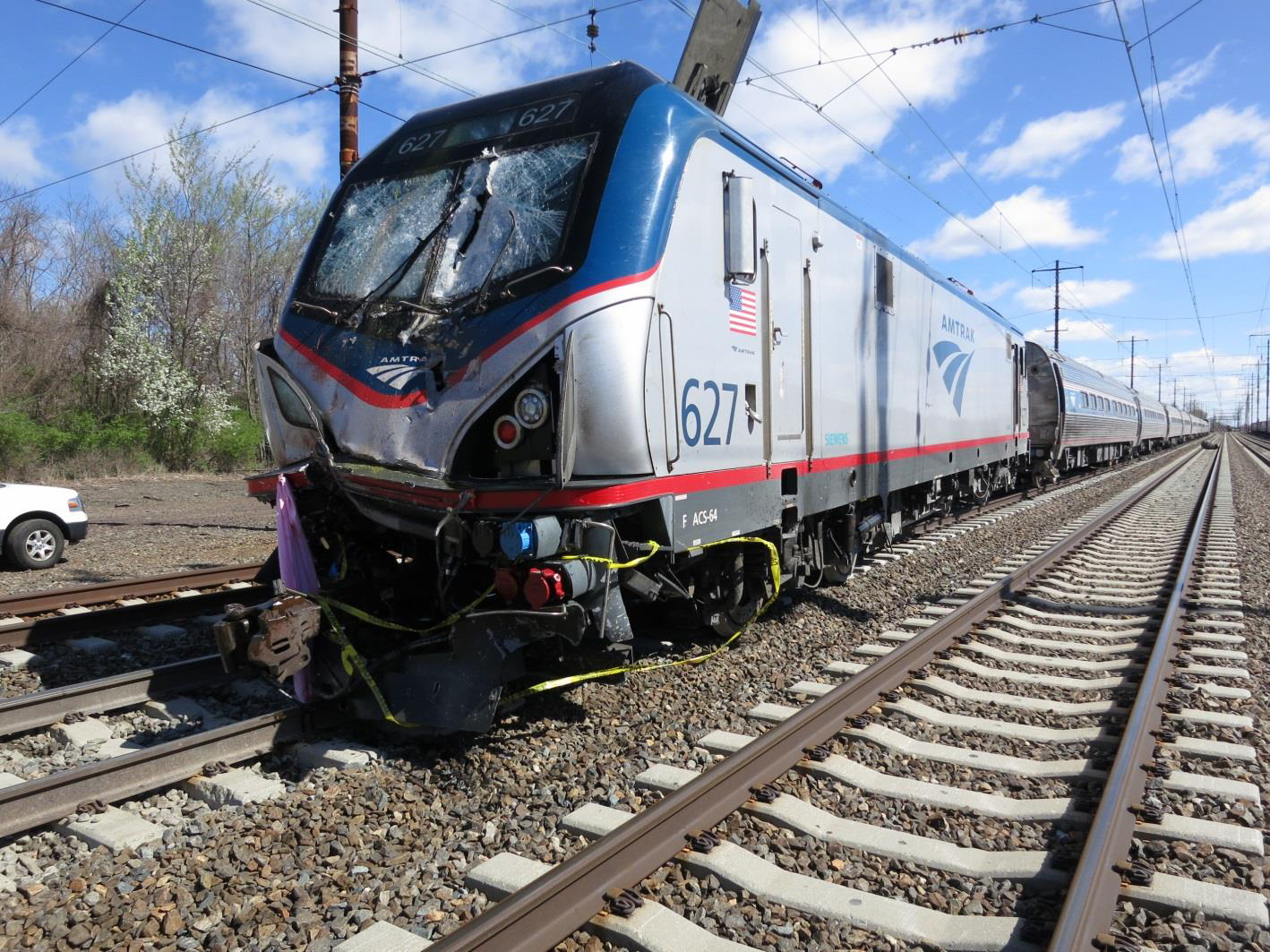
- 2016 Chester, Pennsylvania, train derailment
  3 April – United States – 2016 Chester, Pennsylvania, train derailment: Two people died and 31 were injured after an Amtrak train collided with a backhoe in Chester, Pennsylvania, near Philadelphia.
- 3 April – United Kingdom – A First Great Western passenger train collided with a stationary train at Plymouth, injuring up to 20 people.
- 4 April – Thailand – A double-decker bus rammed into a train at an unguarded railway crossing in Nakhon Chai Si District, Nakhon Pathom Province, killing three people and injuring 25.
- 8 April – Costa Rica – Two commuter trains collided head-on near Pavas injuring more than 200.
- 9 April – Sweden – An empty passenger train crashed through buffer stops at Karlstad while being shunted into a siding that was too short for it. Several staff on board were injured.
- 10 April – United Kingdom – An Abellio Greater Anglia Class 170 passenger train collided with an agricultural tractor on a level crossing at Roudham, Norfolk. The tractor driver was seriously injured, six passengers sustained minor injuries.
- 19 April – Thailand – A garbage truck broke through a grade crossing and hit passenger train No. 447 from Surat Thani to Sungai Kolok with six carriages in Phunphin District, Surat Thani Province. The truck hit the fifth and sixth cars, derailing the train. The truck driver was killed and six persons were injured.
- 22 April – South Korea – A passenger train derailed near Yulchon station, Yeosu, probably due to excessive speed, killing person and injuring eight.
- 1 May – India – Old Delhi-Faizabad Express derailed near Hapur. At least a dozen injuries were reported.
- 6 May – India – A side collision between the Chennai Central – Thiruvananthapuram Central superfast and a suburban train near Pattabiram injured seven.
- 8 May – Nigeria – A runaway train derailed in Jebba, resulting in four casualties.
- 20 May – Switzerland – A high-speed train collided with a tour bus at Interlaken, injuring 16.
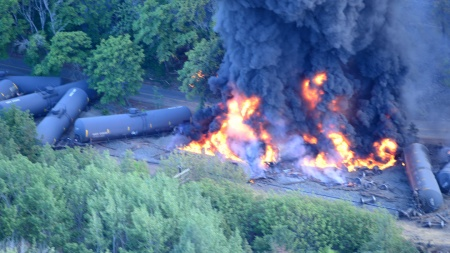
- 2016 Union Pacific oil train fire
  3 June – United States – 2016 Union Pacific oil train fire: A crude oil train derailed due to defective track and caught fire at Mosier, Oregon. The town was evacuated.
- 6 June – Belgium – Hermalle-sous-Huy train collision: A passenger train rear-ended a freight train at Hermalle-sous-Huy. Three people were killed, about 40 were injured, nine seriously.
- 23 June – South Africa – 130 people were injured in a head-on crash between two trains near Durban.
- 26 June – United States – An Amtrak passenger train collided with a van on a grade crossing in southern Colorado, killing five of the six persons in the van.
- 28 June – United States – Two BNSF freight trains collided head-on near Panhandle, Texas. Three crew members were killed, and one was injured after jumping from one of the trains. The wrecked locomotives caught fire following impact.
- 12 July – Italy – Andria–Corato train collision: Two passenger trains collided head-on near Andria in the Apulia region, killing 23 people and injuring 54.
- 14 July – United States – Norfolk Southern train 164 struck a tractor-trailer in Chattanooga, Tennessee, resulting in the train derailing and the lead locomotive overturning. Two employees were injured.
- 22 July – Iran – At least 30 people were injured after a train collided with a truck at a railway crossing in Mazandaran.
- 13 August – Finland – Two cargo trains collided, causing a derailment of a locomotive and three cargo wagons in Oulu. The rail yard and train equipment suffered substantial damage while driver was hospitalized for minor injuries.
- 9 September – Spain – O Porriño derailment: A passenger train derailed at O Porriño, killing four and injuring 49.
- 10 September – United Kingdom – A Romney, Hythe & Dymchurch Railway passenger train collided with a tractor on an occupation crossing at Dymchurch. The locomotive is derailed. The train driver and four passengers sustained minor injuries.
- 15 September – Pakistan – A passenger train and a freight train collided near Multan, killing six and injuring more than 150.
- 16 September – United Kingdom – London Midland British Rail Class 350 350 264 struck a landslide and derailed in the Hunton Bridge Tunnel, near Watford Junction. Unit 350 233 then collided with the derailed train. Two people were injured.
- 20 September – Canada – A 3-car C-Train owned by the Calgary Transit derailed and ran into a pole, injuring the driver.
- 24 September – Algeria – Two trains crashed into each other killing 1 and injuring 60.
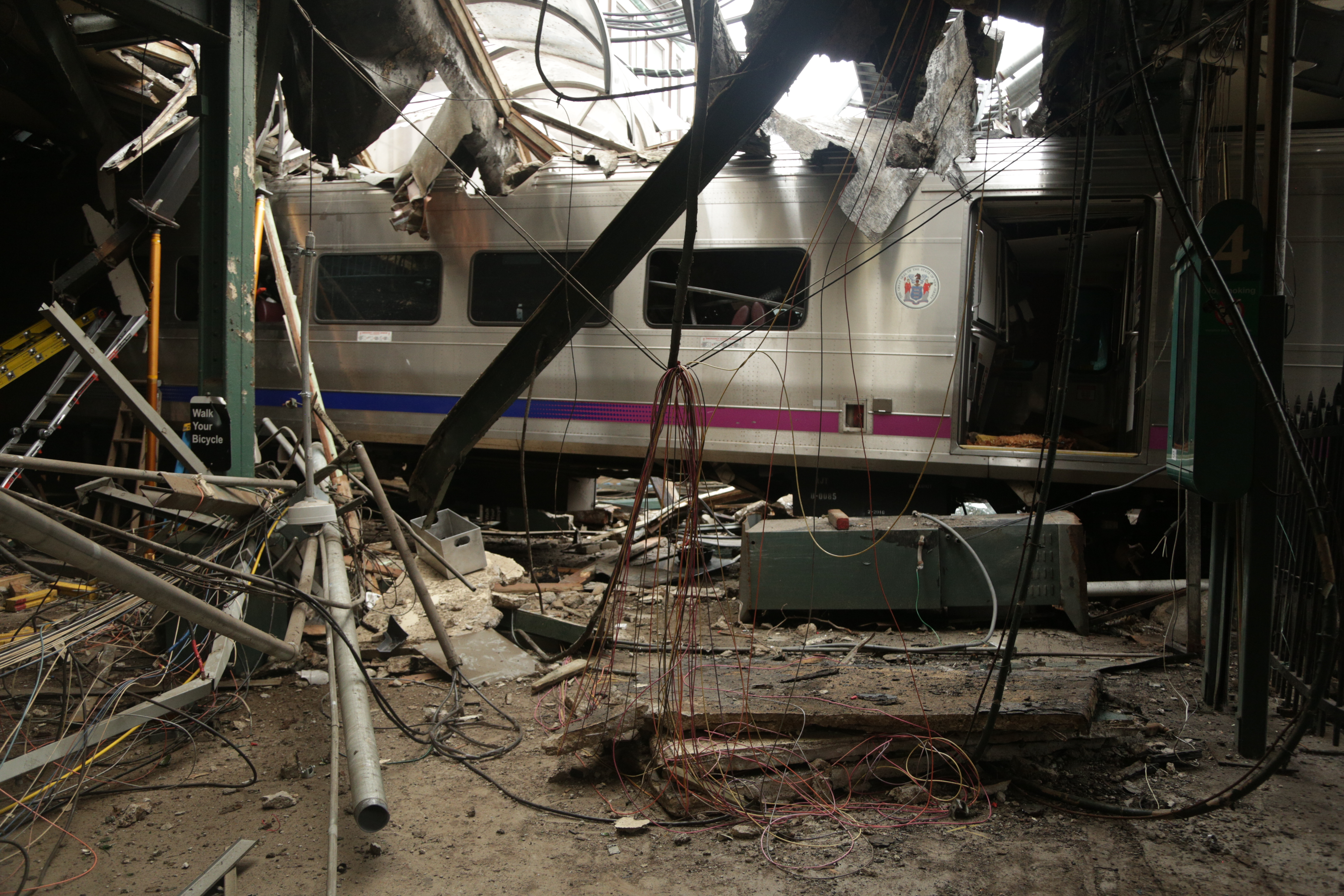
- 2016 Hoboken train crash
  29 September – United States – 2016 Hoboken train crash: A NJ Transit train entering Hoboken Terminal overran the end-of-track bumper block and smashed into a wall, causing structural damage to the terminal building. A woman on the platform was killed by falling debris and 114 others were injured.
- 8 October – United States – 33 people were injured, four seriously, after a Long Island Railroad commuter train struck a work train that was partially fouling the track near a switch near New Hyde Park.
- 21 October – Cameroon – 2016 Eséka train derailment: A packed train derailed near Eséka on the Camrail line between Yaoundé and Douala, killing 79 and injuring 551.
- 3 November – Pakistan – Karachi rail crash: Two passenger trains collided near Karachi's Landhi railway station, killing at least 21 and injuring more than 60 others.
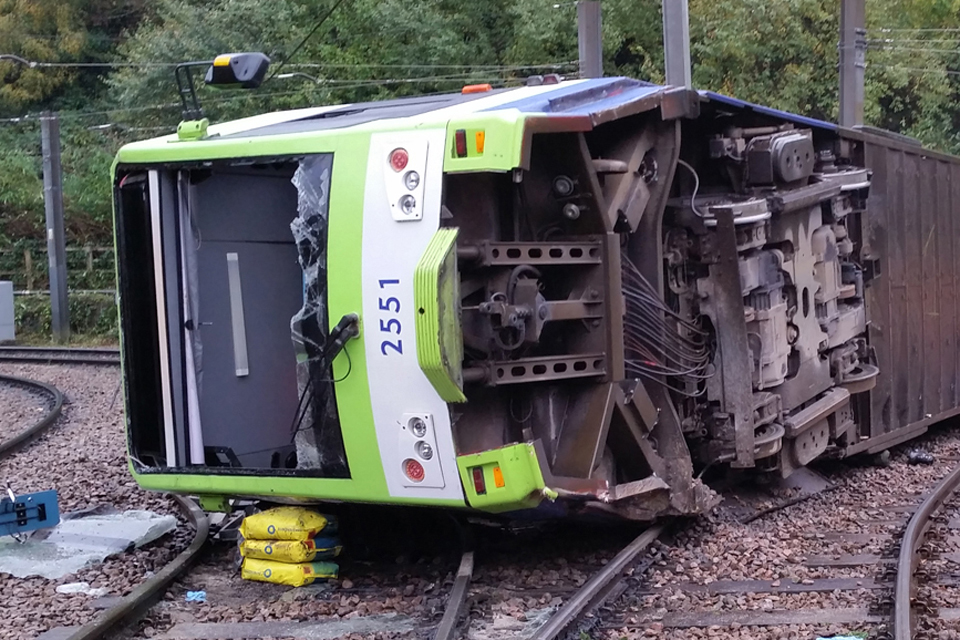
- 2016 Croydon tram derailment
  9 November – United Kingdom – 2016 Croydon tram derailment: A Tramlink two car tram, No. 2551, derailed and overturned while approaching the Sandilands tram stop in the London borough of Croydon, killing seven and injuring 58.
- 20 November – India – Pukhrayan train derailment – 14 coaches of Indore–Patna Express derailed near Kanpur, killing 150 people and injuring another 150.
- 25 November – Iran – Semnan–Damghan train collision – Four coaches derailed, two of which caught fire, after a passenger train crashed into a second passenger train that had broken down at Haf-Khan, Semnan Province, killing 49 and injuring 103.
- 29 November – Romania – A collision between two trains in Gorj County left one dead and another in critical condition.
- 30 November – United States – In Morgantown, West Virginia, two Morgantown Personal Rapid Transit trains collided rear on with another train, 2 people were injured.
- 10 December – Bulgaria – Hitrino train derailment – A Bulmarket Rail Cargo freight train traveling from Burgas to Ruse derailed at Hitrino station. Two tank cars, loaded with propane-butane (LPG) and propylene, struck an electricity pylon and exploded, killing seven and injuring 29.
- 28 December – India – Sealdah-Ajmer Express train derailed near Kanpur, injuring 63.
- 28 December – Tunisia – 2016 Djebel Jelloud train accident – A collision between a train and a bus near Tunis killed five and injured 52.
- 28 December – Tunisia – A collision between a freight train and a lorry in Métlaoui killed the train driver's assistant and injured the train driver.

== 2017 ==
- 4 January – United States – 2017 Brooklyn train crash: A Long Island Rail Road commuter train collided with a buffer at Atlantic Terminal in Brooklyn, New York, injuring at least 103.
- 10 January – India – In Darjeeling, a Darjeeling Himalayan Railway train derailed due to a faulty train, 10 people were injured.
- 21 January – India – Kuneru train derailment: A passenger train derailed in Andhra Pradesh, killing at least 41 people and injuring 68 others.
- 8 February – United States – Miami: A Metromover train collided with a piece of engineering equipment near Brickell Train Station, killing one person and injuring another.
- 14 February – Australia – A V/Line VLocity diesel multiple unit derailed after colliding with an abandoned vehicle on the line near Kangaroo Flat, Victoria. Two people were hospitalized.
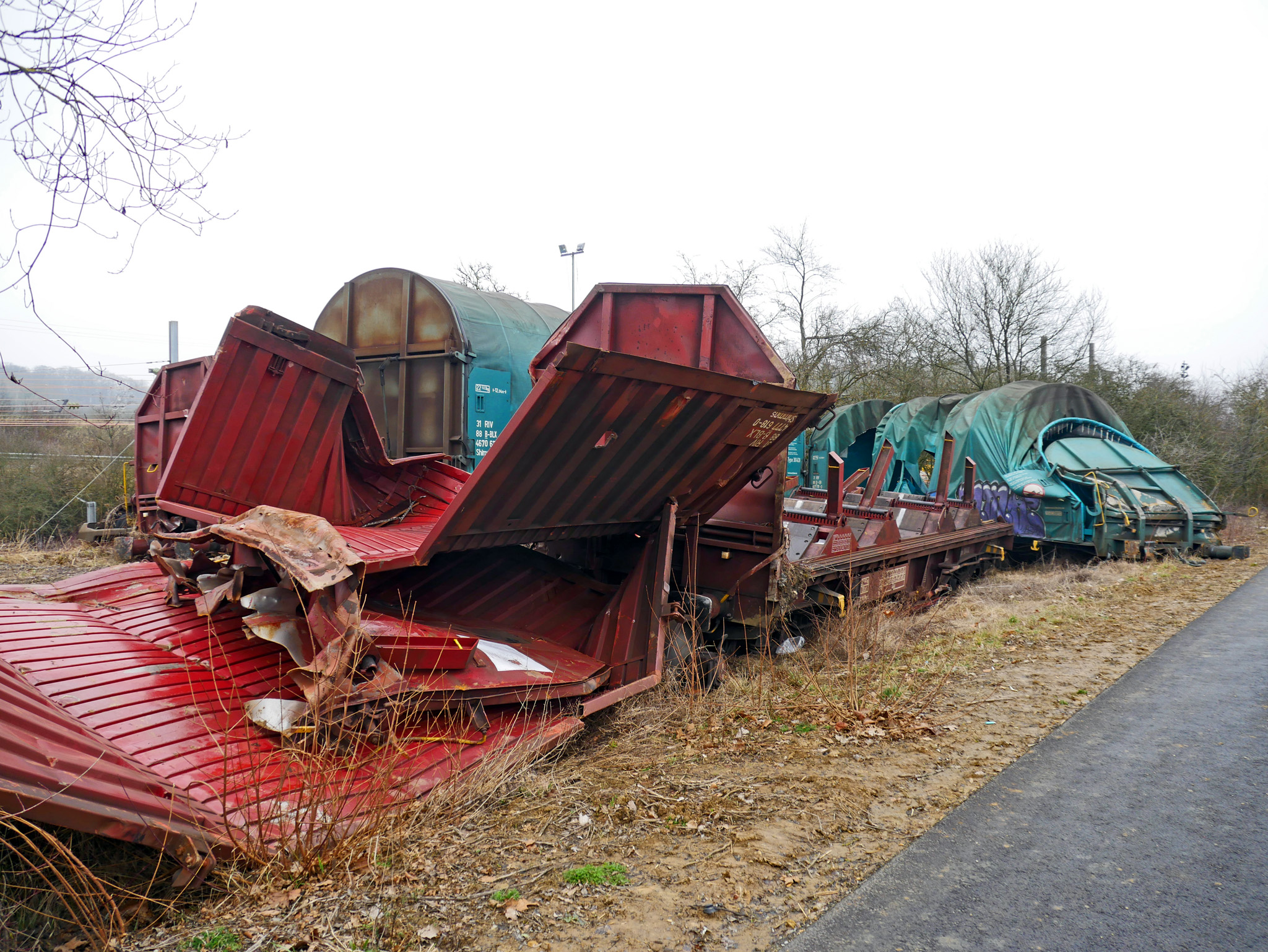
- Dudelange train collision
  14 February – Luxembourg – Dudelange train collision – One person was killed and two were injured after a commuter train crashed head-on with a freight train near Bettembourg.
- 17 February – Saudi Arabia – A passenger train derailed near Dammam due to flooding of the line, injuring 18.
- 18 February – Belgium – 2017 Leuven derailment: A passenger train derails at Leuven, killing one person and injuring 27.
- 20 February – South Africa – Two trains on the same track at the Lynn Ross station in Rosslyn in Pretoria collided and injured more than 100 people.
- 21 February – United States – A train on SEPTA's Market-Frankford Line derailed in a rail yard loop in Upper Darby Township, Pennsylvania after crashing into a stopped train, seriously injuring an operator and injuring three others. Cars from the derailed train collided with a third train on an adjacent track.
- 28 February – United Kingdom – 2017 Liverpool Lime Street wall collapse.
- 7 March – United States – Four people were killed in Biloxi, Mississippi after a CSX freight train hit their charter bus after it got stuck on the tracks at a grade crossing.
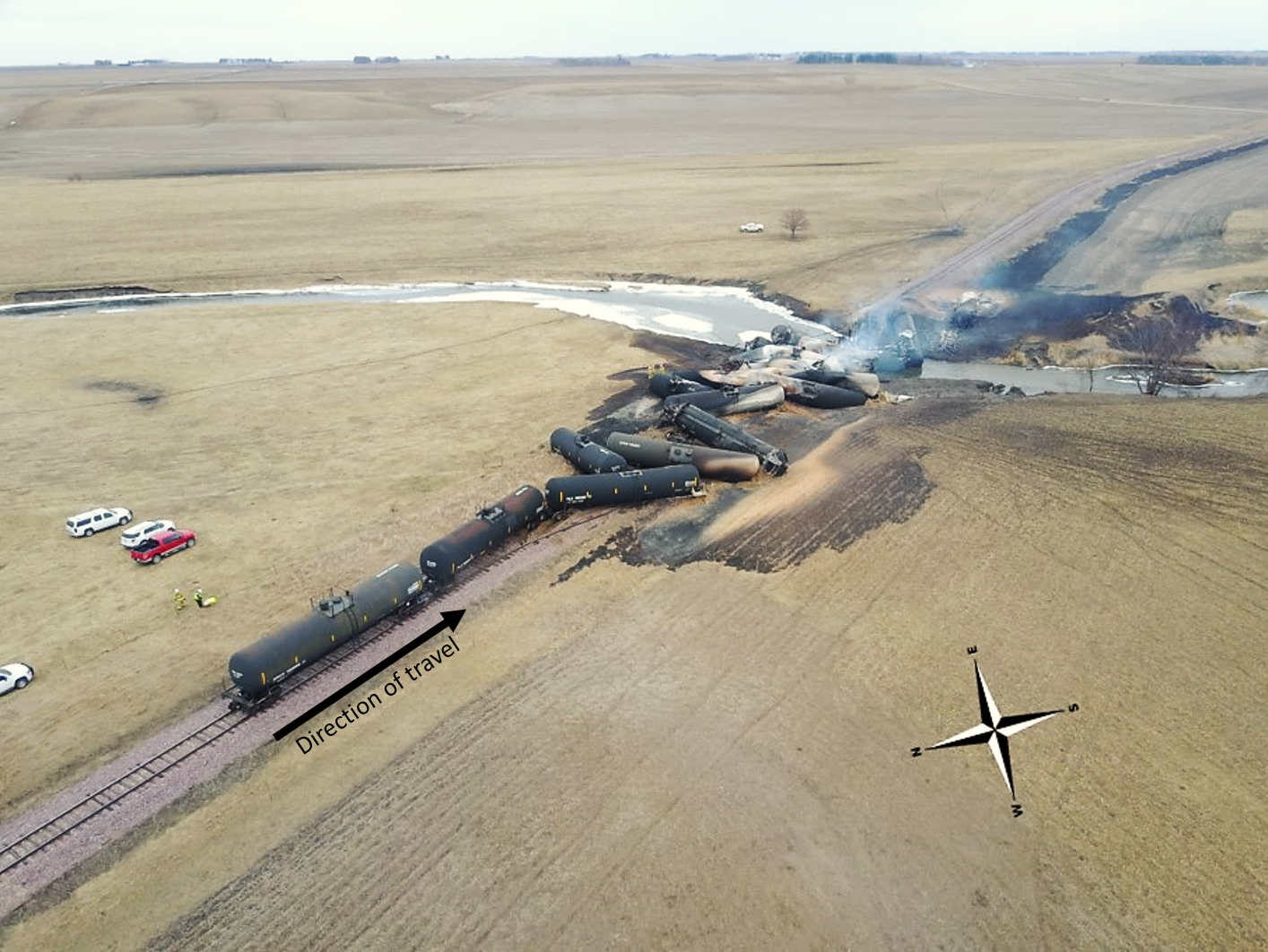
- Graettinger, Iowa
  10 March – United States – A Union Pacific freight train convoying ethanol derailed and burst into flames while crossing a trestle bridge near Graettinger, Iowa.
- 22 March – Switzerland – A Eurocity 158 traveling from Milan to Basel derailed in Lucerne injuring six.
- 29 March – India – Eight carriages of the Mahakaushal Express from Jabalpur to New Delhi derailed at Mahoba in Uttar Pradesh, injuring 25.
- 8 April – Russia – Two passenger trains collided in Moscow, injuring about 50 people.
- 1 May – Germany – An ICE 2 electric multiple unit derailed at Dortmund Hauptbahnhof, injuring two.
- 13 May – Greece – 2017 Adendro train derailment: A train heading from Athens to Thessaloniki derailed near Adendro killing three and injuring ten.
- 2 June – United States – In Washington, D.C., a DC Streetcar crashed into a Metro Bus, injuring ten.
- 27 June – United States – A southbound New York City Subway train derailed then caught fire near 125th Street, resulting in 39 minor injuries.
- 2 July – United States – An Amtrak passenger train derailed at Steilacoom, Washington. A few passengers sustained minor injuries.
- 21 July – United States – The second set of wheels on a southbound New York City Subway train derailed near Brighton Beach, injuring nine people.
- 26 July – Cameroon – A freight train operated by Camrail and carrying hydrocarbon products derailed near Makondo, killing a guard.
- 28 July – Spain – 2017 Barcelona train crash: A train ran into the buffers at França Station in Barcelona. 56 people were injured, three critically.
- 11 August – Egypt – Alexandria train collision: Two trains collided near Alexandria, killing 40 and injuring 133.
- 15 August – United Kingdom – A train hit the buffers at King's Cross station in London, injuring two.
- 19 August – India – 2017 Khatauli train derailment: The Kalinga Utkal Express train derailed near Khatauli in Muzaffarnagar district, Uttar Pradesh, killing 23 and injuring more than 60.
- 22 August – United States – A SEPTA Norristown High Speed Line remain rear-ended an out of service Norristown High Speed Line train at 69th Street Terminal in Upper Darby Township, Pennsylvania. 33 people were injured, four seriously.
- 23 August – India – Auraiya train derailment: Train Kaifiyat Express derailed between Pata and Uchhalda railway stations, injuring 74.
- 11 September – Switzerland – An engine of the Matterhorn Gotthard Bahn collided with its own coaches during maneuvers at Andermatt station, injuring about 30 people.
- 2 October – Poland – An EN57 electric multiple unit hit a woman passing between platforms 1 and 2 of Pabianice station, crushing her leg.
- 6 October – Russia – A train hit a bus in Vladimir Oblast and killed 16 people.
- 8 October – India – A train hits a cement mixer truck in Punjab, killing the train driver.
- 26 October – Finland – Three military conscripts and a train passenger were killed and four conscripts were injured after a passenger train collided with an off-road military lorry in Raseborg. The collided vehicles were Sisu A2045 and Dm12.
- 12 November – Democratic Republic of the Congo – A train carrying flammable material caught fire after crashing into a ravine, killing 33.
- 15 November – Singapore – Joo Koon rail accident: An inbound train to Tuas Link collided with a stationary out of service train at Joo Koon platform due to a bug in the train's signalling equipment, resulting in 36 injuries.
- 25 November – India – A passenger train derailed in Chitrakoot District, Uttar Pradesh, killing three.
- 27 November – Belgium – Morlanwelz train collision and runaway: A passenger train collided with a car on a level crossing at Morlanwelz, Hainaut and was damaged by the consequent fire. The car driver and all on board the train escaped without injury. During recovery operations, the train ran away for 14 kilometres (8.7 mi), striking and killing two track workers and severely injured two others before colliding with a passenger train at Strépy-Bracquegnies. Five passengers on the latter train were injured.
- 29 November – Spain – Heavy rains caused a train traveling from Málaga to Seville to derail near Arahal, leaving 27 injured, two seriously.
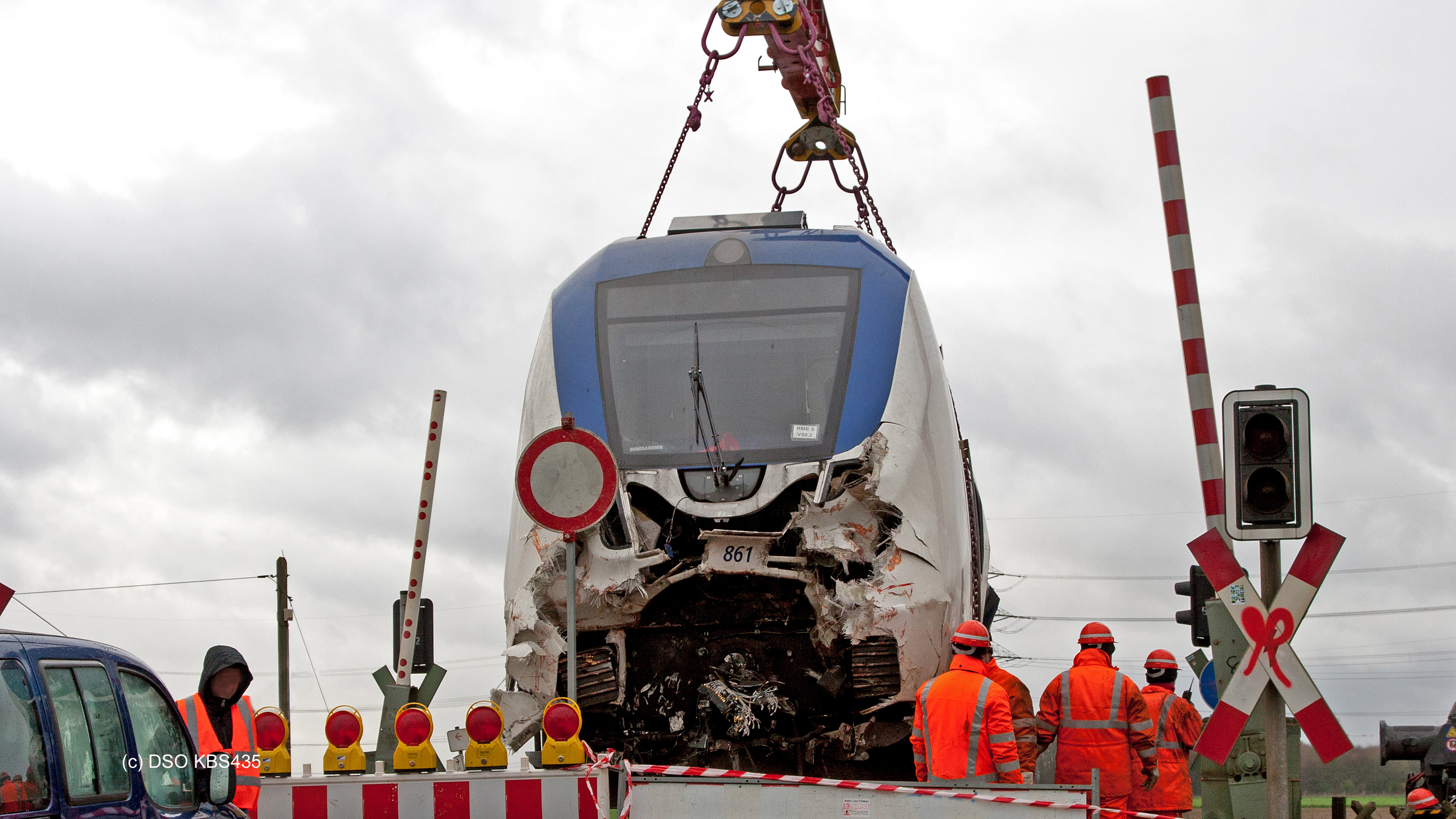
- Meerbusch train crash
  5 December – Germany – Meerbusch train crash: A passenger train rear-ended a freight train near Meerbusch. 50 people were injured, nine seriously.
- 14 December – France – Perpignan crash: A school bus was struck by a passenger train on a level crossing at Millas and was cut in two. Six people were killed and 24 were seriously injured.
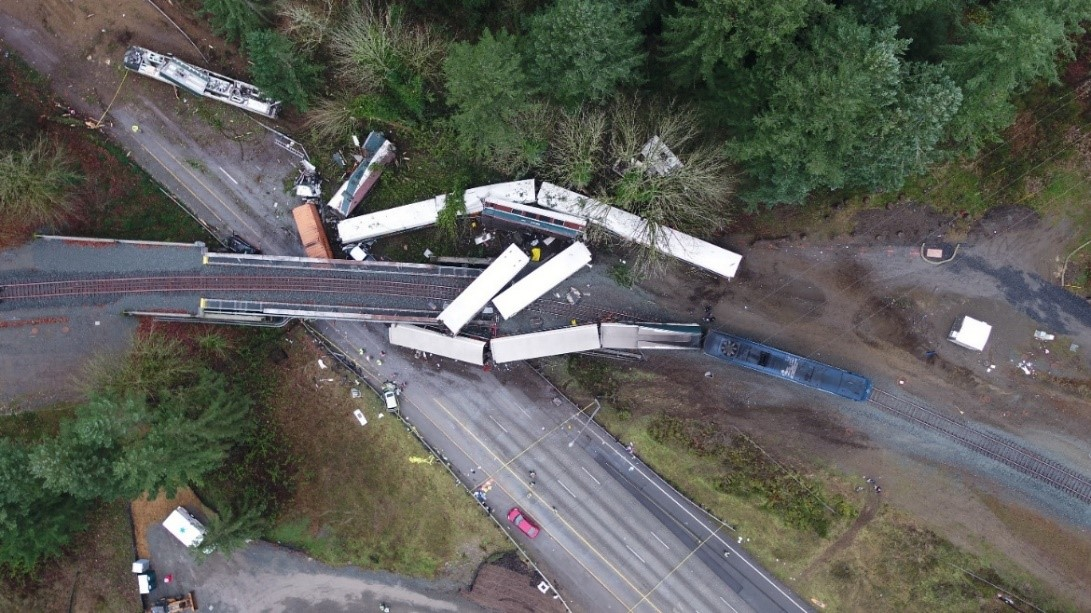
- 2017 Washington train derailment
  18 December – United States – 2017 Washington train derailment: Amtrak Cascades passenger train #501, the inaugural run of the Cascades service on a new rail line designed for higher speeds than the previous route, failed to slow down when approaching a 30 miles per hour (48 km/h) speed restriction and derailed on a bridge over I-5 in Pierce County, Washington. Three people were killed and over 80 were injured.
- 22 December – Spain – A passenger train collided with a buffer stop at Alcalá de Henares station, Madrid, injuring 39.
- 22 December – Austria – In Vienna, a passenger train crashed into another train, injuring 20.

== 2018 ==
- 3 January – Switzerland – A carriage of a Montreux Oberland Bernois Railway train was blown off the tracks by strong winds at Lenk, injuring eight.
- 4 January – South Africa – 2018 Kroonstad train crash: A passenger train derailed after colliding with a lorry on a level crossing near Kroonstad. At least one of the carriages caught fire. 20 people were killed and 254 were injured.
- 9 January – South Africa – A Metrorail passenger train rear-ended another train at Geldenhuis, injuring 226 people.
- 22 January – Australia – A passenger train collided with a buffer stop at Richmond, New South Wales, injuring 16.
- 25 January – Italy – Pioltello train derailment: A train derailed in Pioltello near Milan, killing at least three people and injuring over 100, including over ten seriously. The derailment occurred between the Treviglio and the Pioltello railway stations.
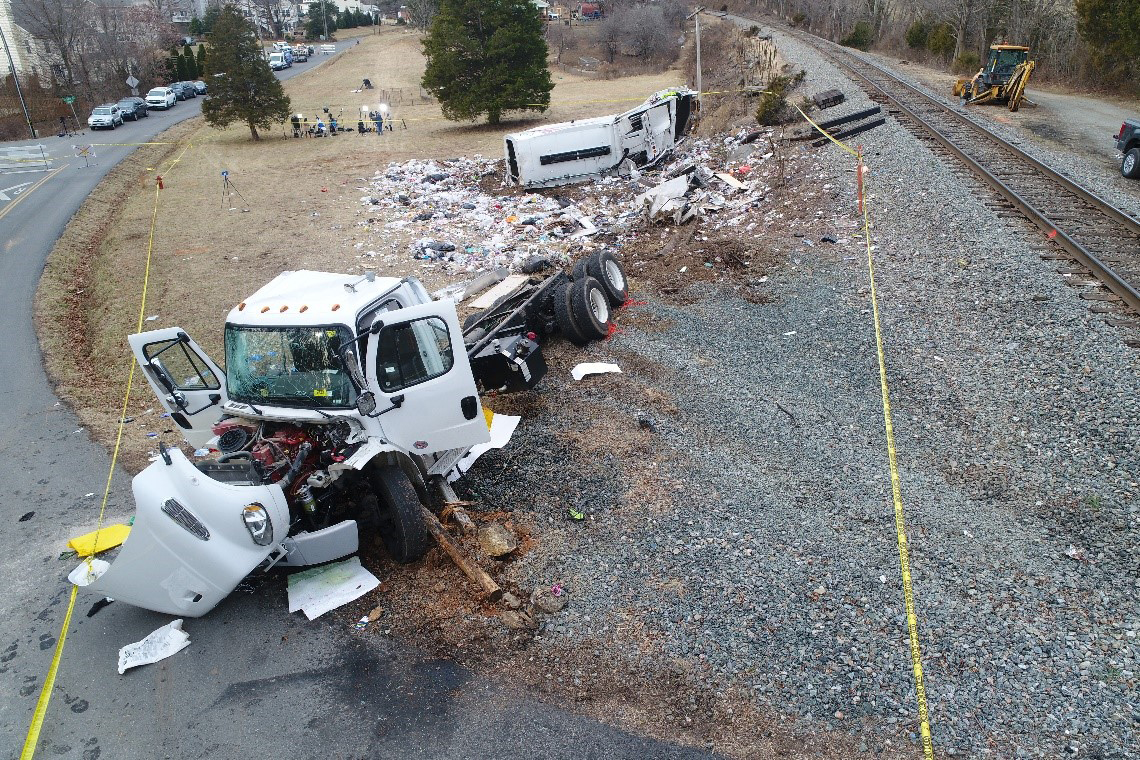
- 2018 Crozet, Virginia train crash
  31 January – United States – 2018 Crozet, Virginia train crash: A chartered Amtrak train carrying Republican Party lawmakers from Washington, D.C. to a retreat in White Sulphur Springs, West Virginia collided with a garbage truck at a grade crossing near Crozet, Virginia. One person on the truck was killed and six people were injured.
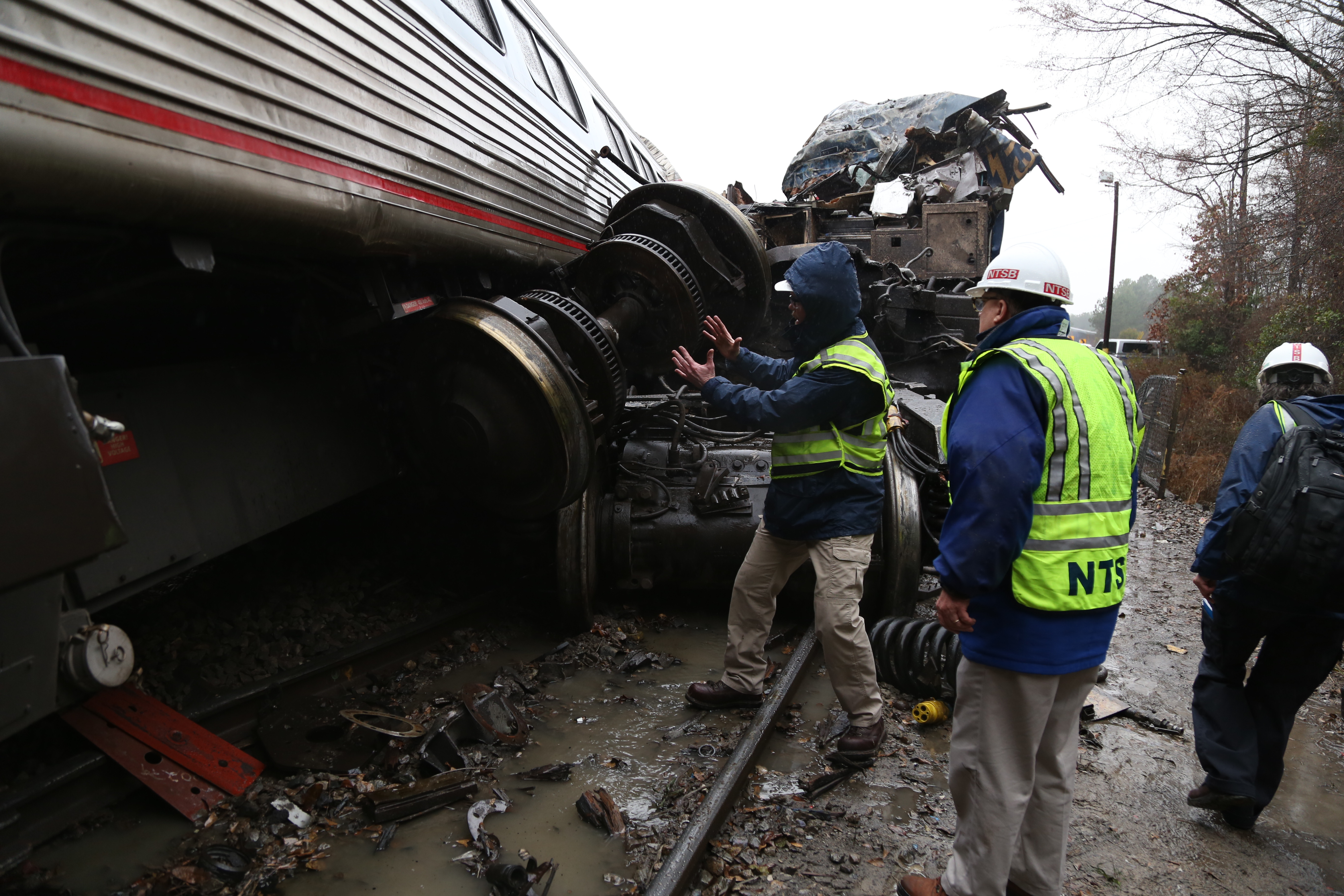
- Cayce, South Carolina train collision
  4 February – United States – Cayce, South Carolina train collision: Amtrak Silver Star train #91 traveling from New York City to Miami collided with a CSX freight train in Cayce, South Carolina, killing at least two people, injuring at least 100 others, and spilling thousands of gallons of fuel.
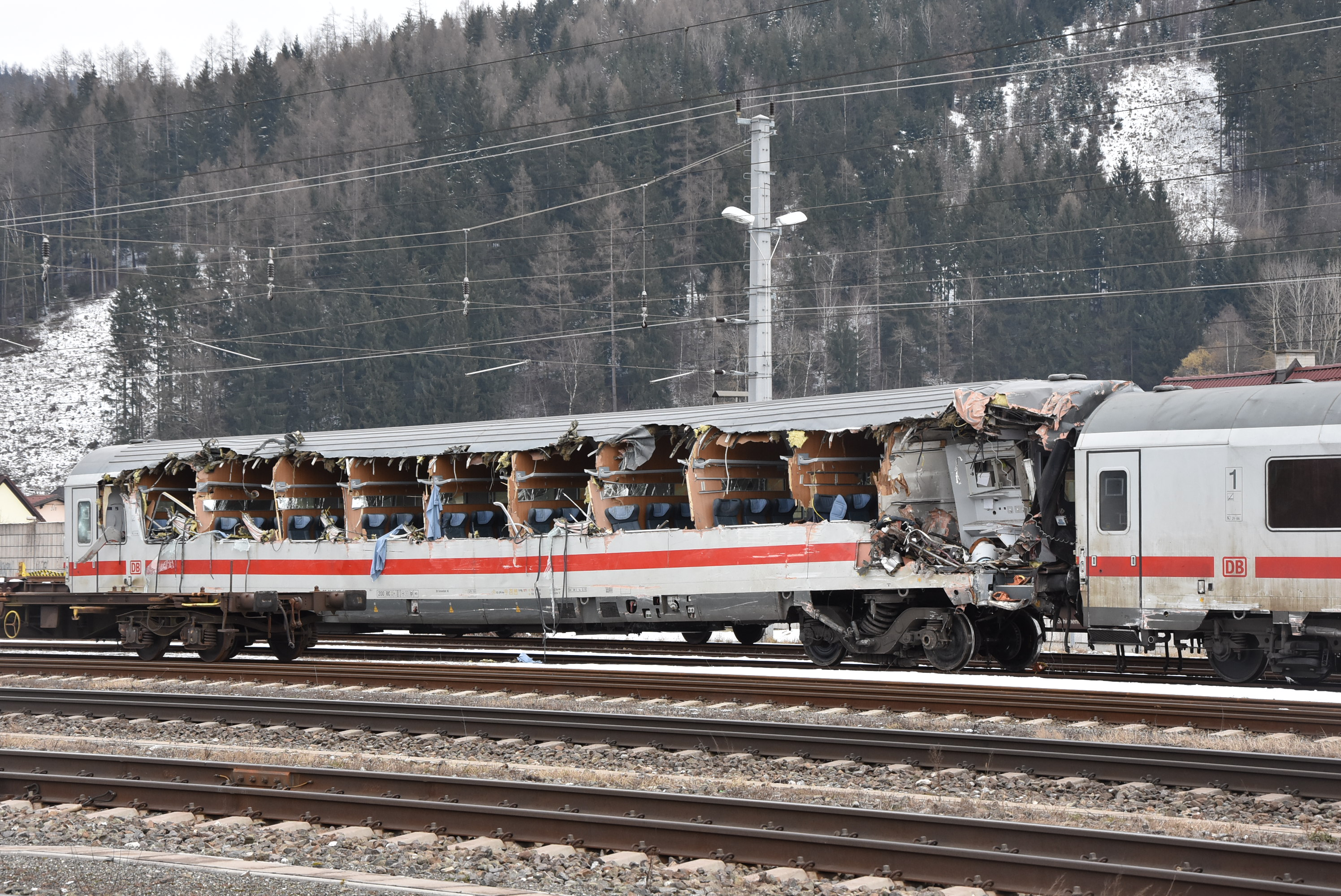
- Niklasdorf train collision
  12 February – Austria – Niklasdorf train collision: Two passenger trains collided at Niklasdorf, killing one person and injuring 22.
- 28 February – Egypt – A head-on crash between two trains killed at least 15 people and injured dozens more near Cairo.
- 18 March – United States – Two Norfolk Southern freight trains collided head-on in Scott County, Kentucky, injuring four people.
- 20 April – Austria – Two passenger trains collided at Salzburg, injuring around 40 people.
- 7 May – Germany – A passenger train collided head-on with a freight train that had been parked on the same track in Aichach, Bavaria, killing the train driver and a passenger.
- 23 May – Italy – A Trenitalia Turin-Ivrea regional train crashed into a truck that was stuck on a railroad crossing on the Chivasso–Ivrea railway near Caluso, Piedmont. Two people were killed and 18 were injured.
- 30 May – Mexico – Two Ferromex trains collided and caught fire between Chihuahua and Ciudad Juárez. The conductor of the northbound train was killed and the other five crew members were injured.
- 17 June – United States – A CSX freight train carrying propane derailed and exploded outside Princeton, Indiana. Authorities evacuated homes within a 1-mile (1.6 km) radius.
- 22 June – United States – A BNSF oil train derailed near Doon, Iowa. An estimated 230,000 gallons (870 600 L) of oil spilled.
- 26 June – Austria – A Mariazellerbahn passenger train was derailed near Sankt Pölten. 30 people were injured, three seriously.
- 8 July – Turkey – Çorlu train derailment: a passenger train from Istanbul to Edirne derailed in Çorlu, killing 24 people and injuring over 300.
- 9 July – United States – In Garfield, New Jersey, a NJ Transit Train crashed into a bus at a railroad crossing, injuring 13.
- 21 July – United States – Union Pacific's steam locomotive 844 struck and killed a pedestrian trying to photograph it in Henderson, Colorado while pulling a special excursion from Denver to Cheyenne, Wyoming.
- 31 July – Peru – In Machu Picchu, 10 people were injured when two passenger trains collided.
- 16 August – United States – In Williamsburg, Virginia, at the theme park Busch Gardens Williamsburg, a steam train the Balmoral Castle caught fire, 1 person was injured.
- 23 August – Bosnia and Herzegovina – Two freight trains collided head-on in Donja Jablanica, near Jablanica killing two people and injuring one.
- 25 August – United States – An outbound Trinity Railway Express train collided with a dump truck at a railroad crossing in Euless, Texas, killing two people from inside the truck and injuring 11 others in the train.
- 15 September – Canada – Ponton train derailment: A Hudson Bay Railway freight train carrying liquid petroleum derailed near Ponton, Manitoba, killing its conductor and leading to a diesel spill.
- 20 September – Netherlands – Oss rail accident: A passenger train collided with a Stint cart on a level crossing at Oss, killing four people and injuring two.
- 12 October – Germany – In Frankfurt, an ICE train caught on fire, injuring three.
- 16 October – Morocco – A train from Rabat to Kenitra derailed in Bouknadel, killing seven people and injuring about 80.
- 19 October – India – Amritsar train disaster: A train ran into a crowd celebrating the Dusshera festival near Amritsar, killing more than 50 people and injuring over 200.
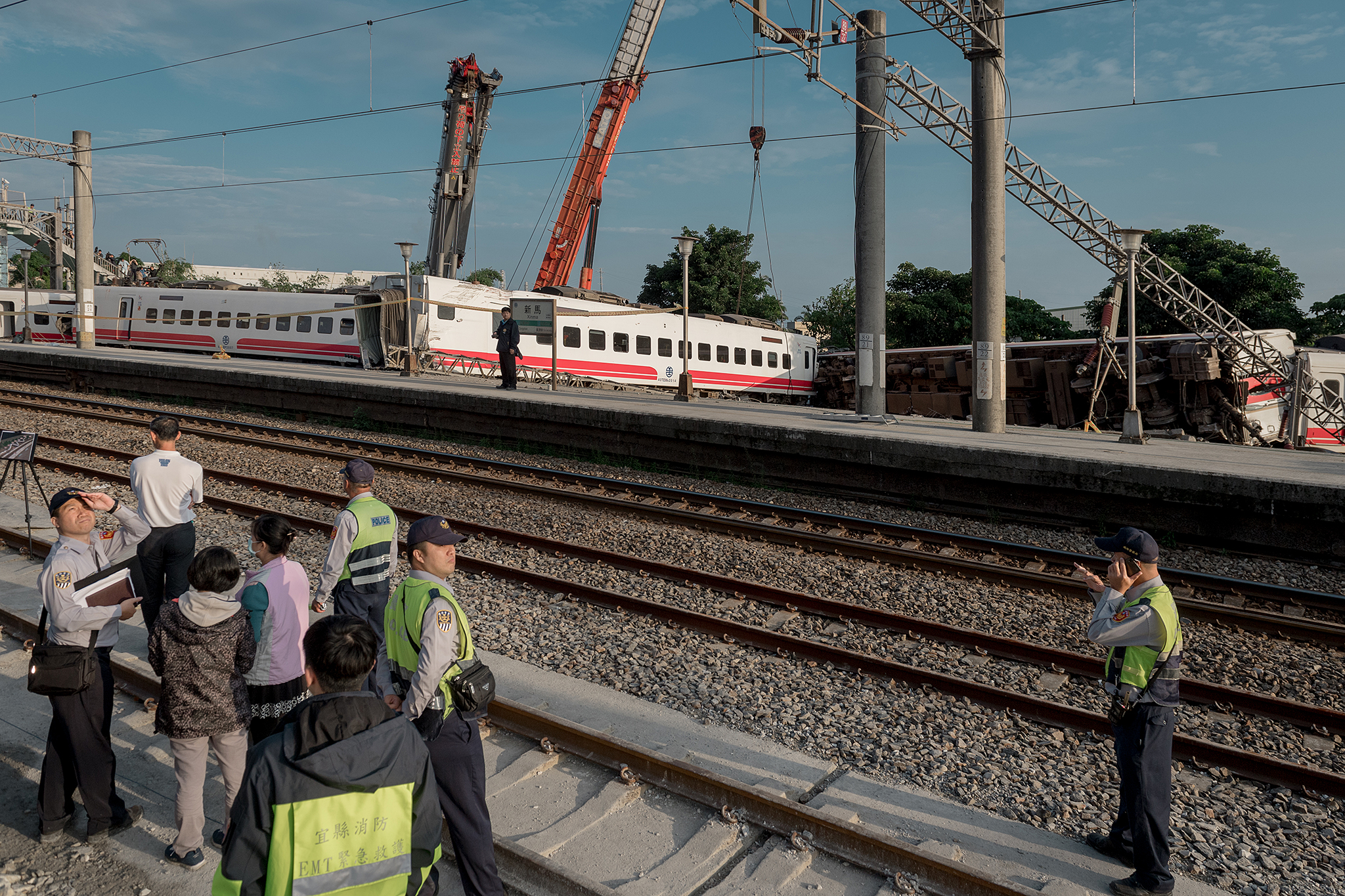
- 2018 Yilan train derailment
  21 October – Taiwan – 2018 Yilan train derailment: A Puyuma express train, operating service No. 6432 from Shulin to Taitung, derailed at Xinma Station, Yilan County, killing 18 people and injuring another 175.
- 20 November – Spain – A passenger train was derailed by a landslide at Vacarisses, killing one person and injuring 44.
- 13 December – Turkey – Marşandiz train collision: A high-speed train collided with a pilot locomotive at Ankara, killing nine people and injuring 48.
- 14 December – Portugal – In Lisbon, a tram derailed due to excessive speed in a curve, injuring 28.
- 21 December – Serbia – A train collided with a bus carrying school students in Donje Međurovo, near Niš, cutting it in half. Five people were killed and more than 13 were injured.

== 2019 ==
- 2 January – Denmark – Great Belt Bridge rail accident: A DSB express passenger train was hit by a semi-trailer from a passing cargo train on the western bridge of the Great Belt Fixed Link, killing eight people and injuring 16.
- 6 January – United States – A Norfolk Southern freight train carrying hazardous chemicals derailed in Jefferson County, Georgia near Bartow, prompting the evacuation of residents within a 7-mile (11 km) radius of the crash site due to tanker leakage. At least 26 people, including a firefighter and three police officers, were treated for chemical exposure.
- 8 January – South Africa – Mountain View train collision: Two passenger trains collided at Mountain View station in Pretoria, killing at least four people and injuring at least 620 others.
- 10 January – Nigeria – Three train cars derailed in Lagos, injuring several people.
- 14 January – India – In Mumbai, India, a Tejas Express train hit and killed three people walking on the tracks.
- 25 January – United States – A Union Pacific autorack train (with EMD-SD70 #4720 leading) collided into a school bus in Athens, Texas, killing a child and injuring another.
- 2 February – India – In Jaipur, India, a Jabalpur Ajmer train derailed. two cars derailed, one person was injured.
- 3 February – India – Seemanchal Express derailment: The Seemanchal Express train derailed near Sahdei Buzurg in Vaishali district of Bihar, killing at least six passengers.
- 4 February – Canada – A westbound Canadian Pacific train derailed east of Field, British Columbia, killing three crew members.
- 8 February – Spain – Two passenger trains collided head-on at Manresa, killing one person and injuring 95.
- 26 February – United States – 2019 Westbury train collision – Two separate Long Island Rail Road trains hit a pickup truck at the School Street railroad crossing in Westbury, New York on the LIRR Main Line, fatally ejecting the driver and two passengers, causing numerous injuries, and damaging the nearby LIRR station platform.
- 27 February – Egypt – Ramses Station rail disaster: A train smashed into a barrier inside Ramses Station, causing a major explosion and a fire. More than 25 people died and at least 50 others were injured.
- 17 March – Democratic Republic of Congo – A freight train with many passengers on its cars derailed, killing 32 and injuring around 70.
- 15 May – India – In Pedana, Andhra Pradesh, a DEMU train struck a buffalo and derailed between Pedana railway station and Kavutaram railway station, the buffalo was killed and one person was injured.
- 19 May – Philippines – An unpowered Manila Light Rail Transit System Line 2 train parked on a pocket track fouled the eastbound track of the main line and collided head-on with another train, injuring 30 passengers and four staff.
- 6 June – United States – In Chicago, Illinois, a CTA Yellow Line train derailed injuring seven people.
- 24 June – Bangladesh – a passenger train derails at Moulvibazar, killing at least four people and injuring more than 200.
- 3 July – United Kingdom – Two track workers wearing ear defenders were struck and killed by a GWR Express near Port Talbot in South Wales.
- 11 July – Pakistan – Sadiqabad railway accident: In Rahim Yar Khan, a passenger train collided with a cargo rake and derailed, killing 24 people and injuring dozens.
- 28 July – United States – In University Park, Illinois, an Amtrak train derailed after crashing into a stalled truck, killing one person and injuring two.
- 23 August – United States – In Sacramento, California, a Sacramento Regional Transit train crashed into another train, injuring 16 people.
- 12 September – Democratic Republic of the Congo – A passenger train derailed in Tanganyika Province, killing more than 50.
- 31 October – Pakistan – 2019 Tezgam train fire: a fire on a passenger train near Rahim Yar Khan killed at least 64 people and injured 30.
- 12 November – Bangladesh – Mondobhag train collision: Two passenger trains collided head-on at Kasba; killing at least 16 people and injuring 100.
- 12 November – India – Two passenger trains collided head-on at Hyderabad, killing 1 and injuring 12 passengers.
- 10 December – Botswana – A Botswana Railways train derailed, killing two crew members.
