= List of American railroad accidents =

This is a list of the most serious U.S. rail-related accidents (excluding intentional acts such as the 1939 City of San Francisco derailment, 1995 Palo Verde derailment, and others).

== 19th century ==
=== 1830s ===
- 1833 Hightstown rail accident, Hightstown, New Jersey; two killed plus 15 injured. Earliest recorded train accident involving the death of passengers.
- 1837 Suffolk head-on collision, Suffolk, Virginia; 3 killed plus dozens injured. Later in the year, a second accident resulted in ten injuries, with two of them ultimately dying.

=== 1850s ===
- 1853 Greater Grand Crossing rail collision, Grand Crossing (now Chicago), Illinois; 18 killed plus 40 injured. Eventually led to massive triple level grade separation project on Chicago's South Side
- 1853 Norwalk rail accident, Norwalk, Connecticut; 48 killed plus 30 injured. First movable bridge disaster in U.S. history and Connecticut's deadliest rail disaster to date
- 1853 Providence and Worcester head-on collision, Valley Falls, Rhode Island; 14 killed plus 17 injured. Rhode Island's deadliest rail disaster is also the first known to be photographed
- 1855 Gasconade Bridge train disaster, Gasconade, Missouri; 35+ killed plus hundreds injured. First deadly rail bridge collapse in U.S. history
- 1856 Great Train Wreck of 1856, Whitemarsh Township, Pennsylvania; 60+ killed plus 100+ injured. Encouraged busier railroads in the Eastern U.S. to double track lines; also led to mandatory use of telegraph in cases of delays
- 1859 South Bend train wreck, Mishawaka/South Bend, Indiana; 42 killed plus 50 injured

=== 1860s ===
- 1863 Chunky Creek Train Wreck, Hickory, Mississippi; ~75 killed plus ~25 injured. All but one of the dead were Confederate reinforcements headed for Vicksburg, with the disaster—Mississippi's deadliest rail disaster to date—further hindering the city's defenses against Union forces
- 1864 Shohola train wreck, Shohola Township, Pennsylvania; ~65 killed plus many more injured. One of the trains was carrying Confederate POWs and Union guards, and citizens of Shohola and nearby Barryville, New York, treated the wounded 'without regard to the colour of their uniforms'
- 1867 Angola Horror, Angola, New York; 49 killed. Led to the standardization of track gauges in the U.S., as well as advancements in coach brake and heating systems. Deadliest train wreck in New York outside New York City.

=== 1870s ===
- 1871 New Hamburg rail disaster, New Hamburg, New York; Collision of passenger train with derailed oil-filled freight tanker car on drawbridge killed 22.
- 1871 Great Revere train wreck, Revere, Massachusetts; ~30 killed. Victims' and families' crippling lawsuits against the company at fault—the Eastern Railroad—led to its forced merger with arch rival, the Boston & Maine
- 1876 Ashtabula River Railroad Disaster, Ashtabula/Edgewood, Ohio; 92 killed plus 64 injured. The deadliest U.S. rail disaster of the 19th century—also Ohio's deadliest to date—led to changes in bridge construction code, the replacement of coal and wood stoves with steam heat in coaches, and mandatory federal investigation of all U.S. rail disasters
- 1877 Pickering Valley wreck, Kimberton, Pennsylvania; 7 killed plus dozens injured. Led Pennsylvania's Supreme Court to formulate a rule that when a railroad accepts money from passengers, an implied contract of care upon the part of the company arises; thus negligence is presumed on the part of the railroad if a passenger is injured
- 1878 Tariffville train crash, Tariffville, Connecticut; 13 killed plus 70+ injured. Death toll might have been worse if not for what was possibly the first emergency phone call in history
- 1878 Wollaston disaster, Quincy, Massachusetts; 19 killed and 170 injured

=== 1880s ===
- 1882 Spuyten Duyvil train wreck, Bronx, New York; eight killed and 19 injured. The dead included state senator Webster Wagner, crushed between two sleeper cars built by his company.
- 1883 Tehachapi train wreck, Tehachapi, California; 15 killed plus 12 injured. Fatalities included a former congressman and the wife of a former governor, who himself was injured
- 1886 Deerfield railway accident, Deerfield, Massachusetts; 11 killed and 36 injured.
- 1886 Silver Creek train wreck, Silver Creek, New York; ~15 killed plus ~15 injured
- 1887 West Hartford Bridge Disaster, Hartford, Vermont, 37 killed plus 50 injured. Vermont's deadliest rail disaster
- 1887 Forest Hills disaster, Boston, Massachusetts; 23 killed and 100+ injured. Possibly the first known U.S. rail disaster to result from fraud.
- 1887 Great Chatsworth Train Wreck, Chatsworth Township, Illinois; ~85 killed plus hundreds injured. Illinois's deadliest rail disaster to date widely encouraged the use of newer steel coaches over conventional wooden ones
- 1887 Chicago and Atlantic Railway Wreck, Kouts, Indiana; 10 killed
- 1888 Wreck at the Fat Nancy, Orange County, Virginia; nine killed plus 26 injured. One of the dead was a civil engineer who designed a proposed culvert to replace the unstable trestle that collapsed
- 1888 Mud Run disaster, Kidder Township, Pennsylvania; 64 killed plus 50 injured. Devastated a generation of the local Irish-American communities

=== 1890s ===
- 1890 Quincy train wreck, Quincy, Massachusetts; 23 killed plus 29 injured
- 1891 Great Kipton Train Wreck, Kipton, Ohio; 9 killed. Led to the adoption of stringent quality-control standards for railroad chronometers
- 1891 Bostian's Bridge train disaster, Statesville, North Carolina; 25-30 killed plus 25-30 injured. Several incidents of individuals reportedly hearing wails and moans at this location on the anniversary of the disaster have made Bostian's Bridge popular with paranormal activists
- 1891 Great East Thompson Train Wreck, East Thompson, Connecticut; 2 killed plus hundreds injured. First of only two U.S. rail disasters to involve four different trains
- 1893 Chester train wreck, Chester, Massachusetts; At least 14 killed
- 1893 Battle Creek train wreck, Battle Creek, Michigan; 26 killed
- 1893 Kingsbury, Indiana train wreck, Kingsbury, Indiana; September 22, 1893 | 13-14 dead
- 1896 Atlantic City rail crash, Atlantic City, New Jersey; 50 killed plus ~60 injured
- 1897 Garrison train crash, Garrison, New York; 19 killed. Encouraged increases in track inspections

== 20th century ==
=== 1900s ===
- 1900 Casey Jones's final run, Vaughan, Mississippi; 1 killed (Jones); everyone else escaped with varying degrees of injury. Inspired several different ballads about the incident
- 1900 Camp Creek train wreck, McDonough, Georgia; 39 killed. Bodies of many dead were brought to McDonough Town Square for identification; local folklore claims this has resulted in it being haunted ever since
- 1900 Tacoma streetcar disaster, Tacoma, Washington; 43 killed plus 65 injured
- 1901 Buffalo Bill Show train wreck, Lexington, North Carolina; no human deaths but well over 100 show animals killed. This likely led to the demise of "Buffalo Bill" Cody's Wild West Show Tours.
- 1902 Park Avenue Tunnel (railroad) collision, New York City; 15 killed plus 30+ injured. Led to the construction of the current Grand Central Terminal and electrification of all rail lines in New York City
- 1902 Mountain Lake (New York) railroad wreck, Gloversville, New York; 14 killed. The little electric railroad known for its scenic tourism never recovered and was eventually removed altogether
- 1903 Esmond Train Wreck, Esmond, Arizona; 14 killed. Remains Arizona's deadliest rail disaster to date
- 1903 Wreck of the Old 97, Danville, Virginia; 11 killed. What is possibly Virginia's deadliest rail disaster to date inspired the famous ballad of the same name sung by many famous musicians
- 1903 Purdue Wreck, Indianapolis, Indiana; 17 killed. Devastated Purdue University's Football team for the year, who are honored before every game to this day.
- 1903 Connellsville train wreck, Connellsville, Pennsylvania; 64 killed plus 68 injured
- 1904 Jackson rail disaster, Jackson, Utah; 30+ killed. Most of town was leveled altogether
- 1904 Eden train wreck, Pueblo, Colorado; 97 confirmed killed plus scores missing. Colorado's deadliest rail disaster to date
- 1904 New Market train wreck, New Market, Tennessee; 60+ killed plus 100+ injured
- 1905 Ninth Avenue derailment, New York City; 13 killed plus 48 injured. Deadliest accident on New York's elevated railways
- 1905 Baker Bridge train wreck, Lincoln, Massachusetts; 17 killed plus 33 injured. Led RR commission to encourage railroads and street railways where trains or cars followed each other in quick succession to implement a signalling block system
- 1906 Cimarron River bridge disaster, Dover, Oklahoma; 4 confirmed fatalities plus scores unaccounted for
- 1906 Atlantic City train wreck, Atlantic City, New Jersey; 53 killed. Resulted in what is likely the first known press release by a private entity
- 1906 Woodville Train Wreck, Porter County, Indiana; at least 48 confirmed killed plus many missing and at least 81 confirmed injured
- 1906 Washington, D.C., train wreck; 53 killed plus 70 injured. Led to a complete U.S. ban on wooden coach construction; the accident is notoriously described in Frank Kuntz's book Undergraduate Days 1904-1908
- 1907 Southern Pacific Sunset Express derailment, Colton, California; 24 killed
- 1907 Pere Marquette Railway wreck, Salem, Michigan; 31 killed plus 101 injured. Michigan's deadliest rail disaster
- 1907 Boston & Maine collision, Canaan, New Hampshire; 25 killed plus 25 injured. New Hampshire's deadliest rail disaster to date
- 1908 Metz Fire and derailment, Metz Township, Michigan; 26 killed
- 1909 The Chicago Lake Shore and South Bend Railway wreck, Porter County, Indiana; 12-14 killed plus ~40 injured
- 1909 Southern Railway derailment, Reedy Fork threstle, North Carolina; 14 killed plus 25 injured

=== 1910s ===
- 1910 FW&WV (Indiana Railroad) collision, Kingsland, Indiana; 35-40 killed. Worst interurban Trolley disaster in U.S history
- 1910 Wellington avalanche, Wellington, Washington; 96 killed. The worst avalanche in U.S. history destroyed two trains and a rail depot
- 1910 Green Mountain train wreck, Green Mountain, Iowa; 52 killed plus scores injured. Remains the state of Iowa's deadliest rail disaster to date
- 1910 Grand Trunk collision, Durand, Michigan; 18+ killed
- 1911 Indianola train wreck, McCook, Nebraska; 18 killed plus 32 injured. Nebraska's deadliest rail disaster to date
- 1911 Federal Express (train) wreck, Bridgeport, Connecticut; 14 killed. Train was transporting the St. Louis Cardinals baseball team
- 1912 Corning train wreck, Corning (Gibson), New York; 39 killed plus 88 injured. Strongly encouraged use of automatic block signaling and led to mandatory use of steel coaches for high speed passenger rail service
- 1912 Ligonier Valley Railroad Wilpen disaster, Wilpen Fairgrounds, Pennsylvania; 26 killed plus 29 injured
- 1913 Bar Harbor Express-White Mountain Express collision, New Haven, Connecticut; 21 killed
- 1914 Missouri and North Arkansas Railroad/Kansas City Southern Railway collision, Tipton Ford, Missouri; 43 killed plus 38 injured. Possibly Missouri's deadliest rail disaster to date
- 1916 Summer Street Bridge disaster, Boston, Massachusetts; 46 killed. Deadliest disaster in Boston's history up to that point and still remains the city's deadliest transport-oriented disaster.
- 1917 Frisco collision, Kellyville, Oklahoma; 23 killed along with many cattle plus 80 injured. Remains the state of Oklahoma's deadliest rail disaster to date
- 1917 Shepherdsville train wreck, Shepherdsville, Kentucky; ~50 killed. Remains the state of Kentucky's deadliest rail disaster to date
- 1918 Hammond Circus Train Wreck, Gary/Hammond, Indiana; 86 killed plus 127 injured. Remains Indiana's deadliest rail disaster to date
- 1918 Great train wreck of 1918, Nashville, Tennessee; 101 killed plus 171 injured. Officially the deadliest U.S. rail disaster to date
- 1918 Malbone Street wreck, New York City; 95-100 killed plus 100+ injured. Remains the deadliest rail disaster in the History of New York state and the New York City Subway
- 1919 New York Central collision, Byron, New York; 22 killed
- 1919 Onawa train wreck, Onawa, Maine; 23 killed plus 50 injured. Maine's deadliest rail disaster to date

=== 1920s ===
- 1920 Globeville, Colorado Labor Day Denver & Interurban disaster. Twelve dead, 200+ injured, which included many Louisville baseball fans.
- 1921 Porter Train Wreck, Porter, Indiana; 37 killed plus 100+ injured. Eventually led to the requirement of cab signaling in the U.S.
- 1921 Bryn Athyn Train Wreck, Bryn Athyn, Pennsylvania; 27 killed plus 70 injured
- 1922 Winslow Junction train derailment, Winslow Junction, New Jersey; 7 killed plus 89 injured
- 1922 Missouri Pacific collision, Sulphur Springs, Missouri; 34 killed plus 150 injured
- 1923 Glenrock train wreck, Glenrock, Wyoming; 30 killed plus 66 injured. Remains the state of Wyoming's deadliest rail disaster to date
- 1925 Rockport train wreck, Rockport, New Jersey; ~45 killed plus ~25 injured
- 1925 Granite train wreck, Granite, Colorado; 2 killed plus 107 injured
- 1925 Frisco derailment, Victoria, Marshall County, Mississippi; ~20 killed
- 1926 Granite train wreck, Granite, Colorado; ~30 killed plus 54 injured
- 1926 Ponce de Leon (train)/Royal Palm (train) collision, Rockmart, Georgia; 19 killed plus 113 injured. Inspired the song "The Wreck of the Royal Palm"
- 1928 Times Square derailment, New York City; 18 killed plus ~100 injured

=== 1930s ===
- 1938 Custer Creek train wreck, Saugus, Montana; 47 killed plus 75 injured. Remains the state of Montana's deadliest rail disaster to date
- 1938 South Jordan rail crossing disaster, South Jordan, Utah; 24 killed plus 15 injured. Led to state and eventually federal law requiring the practice of school buses stopping to look and listen for trains at grade crossings
- 1939 City of San Francisco derailment, Harney, Nevada; 24 killed plus 121 injured. The accident was caused by an act of sabotage, specifically, a rail was deliberately moved and spiked back down, causing the streamliner passenger train to derail as it crossed a bridge over the Humboldt River near Harney, Nevada.

=== 1940s ===
- 1940 Little Falls Gulf Curve crash, Little Falls, New York; 31 killed plus 51 injured. Led to a realignment to reduce the angle of the curve, which required diverting the Mohawk River farther south and filling in the old channel
- 1940 Doodlebug disaster, Cuyahoga Falls, Ohio; 43 killed
- 1942 Exchange Place station (PATH) derailment, Jersey City, New Jersey; 5 killed plus hundreds injured
- 1943 Lackawanna Limited wreck, Wayland, New York; 29 killed plus 114 injured. Led the Public Service Commission to order the DL&W to install derailing devices as an added safety measure on most sidings connecting to the main lines
- 1943 Frankford Junction train wreck, Philadelphia, Pennsylvania; 79 killed plus 117 injured. Pennsylvania's deadliest rail disaster to date
- 1943 Rennert railroad accident, Rennert, North Carolina; 74 killed. North Carolina's deadliest rail disaster to date
- 1944 Stockton train wreck, Stockton, Georgia; 47 killed plus 41 injured. State of Georgia's deadliest rail disaster to date
- 1944 "Tragedy on Election Day", Aguadilla, Puerto Rico; 16 killed plus 50 injured. Puerto Rico's deadliest rail disaster to date
- 1944 Bagley train wreck, Bagley, Utah; ~50 killed plus 79 injured. Utah's deadliest rail disaster to date
- 1945 Michigan train wreck, Michigan, North Dakota; 34 killed plus hundreds injured. North Dakota's deadliest rail disaster to date
- 1945 California Limited derailment, Santa Anita, California; 5 killed plus hundreds injured
- 1946 Naperville train disaster, Naperville, Illinois; 45 killed plus 125 injured. Eventually convinced the Interstate Commerce Commission to rule that trains traveling 80 mph or more must have "an automatic cab signal, automatic train stop or automatic train control system". (Positive Train Control has since been added as an option to the rule post-ICC)
- 1947 Red Arrow (PRR train) wreck, Gallitzin, Pennsylvania: 22 killed plus 138 injured.
- 1947 Downers Grove train wreck, Downers Grove, Illinois; 3 killed plus 30 injured

=== 1950s ===
- 1950 Rockville Centre train crash, Rockville Centre, New York; 32 killed plus 100+ injured. This along with the Kew Gardens crash pushed LIRR ownership (PRR) to speed up modernization of the system
- 1950 Chicago streetcar crash, Chicago, Illinois; 34 killed plus 50 injured. Led to various safety regulations for transit vehicles, most notably the phasing out of inward-opening doors
- 1950 The Milwaukee Electric Railway and Light Company Rapid Transit & Speedrail Crash, Greenfield, Wisconsin; 8 killed plus 40 injured. Crash ultimately doomed Wisconsin's only rapid transit line
- 1950 Kew Gardens train crash, New York City; 78 killed plus hundreds injured in deadliest surface rail accident in New York.
- 1951 Woodbridge train wreck, Woodbridge, New Jersey; ~85 killed plus hundreds injured. New Jersey's deadliest rail disaster to date
- 1953 Pennsylvania Railroad train wreck, Washington, D.C.; 0 killed but 44 injured; served as inspiration for the ending of Silver Streak (film)
- 1953 New York Central Railroad Accident, Conneaut, Ohio; 21 killed plus 49 injured. The second of only two U.S. rail disasters to involve four trains
- 1955 Spring City School bus-train collision, Spring City, Tennessee; 11 killed plus many injured
- 1956 Redondo Junction train wreck, Los Angeles, California; 30 killed plus 117 injured. California's deadliest rail disaster (not involving an automobile) was one of the first to have its aftermath broadcast live
- 1956 Collision of the Chief (train), Springer, New Mexico; 20 killed plus 35 injured. New Mexico's deadliest rail disaster to date
- Great Train Wreck of 1956. Four killed in a head-on collision of freights near Pineola, Florida. Collision may have been averted had crews agreed to use new radios but refused to unless their pay was increased
- 1958 Newark Bay rail accident, Bayonne, New Jersey; 48 killed plus 48 injured
- 1959 Meldrim trestle disaster, Meldrim, Georgia; 23 killed

=== 1960s ===
- 1960 San Francisco Chief Disaster, Bakersfield, California; 17 killed plus ~60 injured
- 1961 City of Denver-schoolbus collision, Auburn, Colorado; 20 killed plus 16 injured. Remains Colorado's deadliest traffic accident to date
- 1962 Steelton train derailment, Steelton, Pennsylvania; 19 killed plus 120+ injured
- 1963 Chualar bus crash, Chualar, California; 32 killed plus 25 injured. Remains the deadliest U.S. traffic accident to date and California's deadliest to involve a train; also one of a series of events that led to closer scrutiny of migrant labor conditions and fueled the emergence of the chicano and farmworkers labor movements
- 1966 Great Northern Buelow collision, Chester, Montana; 2 killed plus 79 injured. Western Star crashed head-on with Empire Builder that was carrying Great Northern Railway's then-president John M. Budd
- 1966 Everett, Massachusetts train crash, Everett, Massachusetts; 13 killed plus 21 injured. Led to further pressure from government officials to phase out any equipment with inward opening doors and lacking emergency exits plus demand to trucks carrying hazardous materials use "designated crossings" only
- 1969 New Canaan Branch collision, Darien, Connecticut; 4 killed plus 40 injured

=== 1970s ===
- 1970 Crescent City Train Derailment, Crescent City, Illinois; 0 killed but 60 firefighters and civilians were injured. The accident was caused by an overheated wheel bearing on the 20th car of the train, leading to the breaking of the L-4 journal. This caused the truck to side to drop and the leaving wheels to derail. The derailment triggered a series of explosions of propane tank cars, resulting in injuries and significant property damage.
- 1971 Salem, Illinois, derailment; 11 killed plus 163 injured. Led the NTSB to recommended improvements in wheel-slip detection devices for locomotives and in pre-departure testing procedures, and that the FRA draft safety standards to address the ejection of passengers through windows in the event of accidents
- 1972 Gilchrest Road, New York crossing accident; 5 killed plus 46 injured. Led the New York State Department of Motor Vehicles to require all bus drivers complete a certain amount of requirements to qualify for driving
- 1972 Chicago commuter rail crash, Chicago, Illinois; 45 killed plus hundreds injured
- 1973 Littlefield, Texas bus/train crash; 7 killed plus 16 injured
- 1973 Roseville Yard Disaster, Roseville, California, Antelope, California; 0 killed but 43 injured. The disaster was caused by a fire in a military boxcar carrying high explosive aircraft ammunition. this fire was likely ignited by overheated brakes on the train, possibly due to a "hotbox" (overheated wheel bearing) as the train descended from the Sierra Nevada mountains. The fire then detonated the bombs within the boxcar, triggering a chain reaction of explosions across multiple boxcars.
- 1974 Decatur tank car explosion, Decatur, Illinois; 7 killed plus hundreds injured
- 1976 Beckemeyer train accident, 12 killed and four injured.
- 1976 New Canaan Branch collision, New Canaan, Connecticut; 2 killed plus 29 injured
- 1977 Chicago Loop derailment, Chicago, Illinois; 11 killed plus 180+ injured. Led the CTA to forbid motormen to proceed past a red signal "on sight" without first getting permission from the Control Center
- 1978 Waverly, Tennessee, tank car explosion; 16 killed plus 43 injured. Resulted in a major rework of how authorities deal with such hazmat disasters, with Tennessee/TOCD creating a set of standards and the Tennessee Hazardous Materials Institute for training hazmat responders; was also one of the events that helped push the establishment of the Federal Emergency Management Agency (FEMA)
- 1979 Southwest Limited (predecessor to the Southwest Chief) derailment, Lawrence, Kansas; 2 killed plus 69 injured
- 1979 Harvey, Illinois train collision; 2 killed plus 38 injured. Revealed grave deficiencies in railroad operations that had subsided in the US by the late 1970s
- 1979 Philadelphia Conrail collision, Philadelphia, Pennsylvania; 1 killed plus hundreds injured

=== 1980s ===
- 1982 SEPTA gasoline tanker collision, Southampton, PA; 1 killed and 5 injured.
- 1982 Washington Metro train derailment, Washington, DC; 3 killed plus 25 injured. First fatal accident involving passengers on WMATA
- 1984 Montrealer (train) derailment, Williston, Vermont; 5 killed plus 100+ injured. Death toll was low as a result of one of the quickest rescue efforts in U.S. history
- 1985 Westminster Train Collision, Westminster, Colorado; 5 killed (crew members) 0 injured (uninjured). The incident was caused by a failure of the crew of the southbound train to correctly interpret train orders and subsequently depart before the superior northbound train had cleared the section of track. This led to two Burlington Northern freight trains to collide head-on at high speed under an overpass in Westminster, Colorado.
- 1987 Maryland train collision, Chase, Maryland; 16 killed plus 164 injured. Led to complete overhaul of (and introduction of newly strict) drug/alcohol testing standards for all rail (and other transportation) employees in the U.S.
- 1988 Thompsontown Train Collision, Thompsontown, Pennsylvania; 4 killed (crew members) 2 injured. According to the National Transportation Safety Board (NTSB) and other sources, one of the trains, a Conrail coal train (UBT-506), ran a stop signal and collided head-on with a Conrail piggyback trailer train (TV-61). The NTSB investigated the accident and concluded that the crew's attention to the signals was most likely reduced by fatigue.
- 1989 San Bernardino train disaster, San Bernardino, California; 6 killed plus 7 injured. The incident was actually two linked events, with one occurring during the cleanup of the original derailment

=== 1990s ===
- 1990 Market–Frankford Line subway derailment, Philadelphia, Pennsylvania; 4 killed plus 162 injured
- 1991 Dunsmuir, California derailment; no human deaths but vast numbers of aquatic animals poisoned to death by chemical leak
- 1991 Lugoff derailment in South Carolina; 8 killed, 76 injured
- 1991 Union Square derailment, New York City; 5 killed plus 161 injured
- 1992 Nemadji River bridge derailment, Superior, Wisconsin; no direct human deaths but many animals—wild and domestic—confirmed killed by chemical leak; 50,000 to 80,000 people evacuated from Superior and from Duluth, Minnesota
- 1993 Big Bayou Canot rail accident, Mobile, Alabama; 47 killed plus 103 injured. Alabama's deadliest rail disaster to date
- 1993 Kelso Train Collision, Kelso, Washington; 5 killed plus 0 injuries. The accident was caused by the southbound Burlington Northern crew apparently missing a crucial signal. Although the signal system and train brakes were functioning properly, and the locomotive's "black box" indicated the crew was awake and operating controls up until the collision, the train passed two restrictive signals without emergency braking being applied before the collision. This caused the Burlington Northern freight train to collide head-on with a Union Pacific freight train.
- 1994 Cajon Pass Runaway, Cajon Pass, California; 0 killed but 2 injured. The incident was caused by a blockage in the air hose and several braking failures on several container cars on an intermodal train. This caused a Santa Fe intermodal train to rear end a parked Union Pacific coal train at milepost 61.55 below the California State 138 overpass in Cajon Junction, on Cajon Pass, California. This caused a major derailment and fire.
- 1995 Palo Verde, Arizona, derailment, Palo Verde, Arizona; 1 killed plus 78 injured. The derailment was caused by sabotage, the perpetrators are unknown. however, a rail was shifted out of place on purpose, causing Amtrak's Sunset Limited to pass over it and derail on a bridge.
- 1995 Fox River Grove bus–train collision, Fox River Grove, Illinois; 7 killed plus 21 injured
- 1996 Cajon Pass Runaway, Cajon Pass, California; 2 killed plus 1 injured. The runaway was caused by a blockage in the air hose throughout several cars on the train, this caused the Santa Fe manifest train to go out of control and crash off a curve in Cajon Junction, On Cajon Pass, California. This caused a dangerous fire with chemicals creating the risk of a Boiling Liquid Expanding Vapor Explosion (BLEVE).
- 1996 Secaucus train collision, Secaucus, New Jersey; 3 killed plus 162 injured
- 1996 Maryland train collision, Silver Spring, Maryland; 11 killed plus 26 injured
- 1996 Weyauwega, Wisconsin, derailment, Weyauwega, Wisconsin; 0 killed but 1,700 evacuated. The derailment was caused by a broken rail that wasn't fixed by workers, this caused an 81-car Wisconsin Central freight train to derail in Weyauwega, Wisconsin which created the risk of a BLEVE. This resulted into all 1,700 residents of the town being evacuated.
- 1997 Kingman Derailment, Kingman, Arizona; 0 killed but 183 (10 Amtrak employees and 173 passengers) were injured. The derailment was caused by the displacement of the track on a bridge due to erosion and scouring of the bridge's inadequately protected shallow foundations during a severe flash flood from a storm. More specifically, what caused it was flash flood, bridge failure and track displacement. This caused Amtrak's Southwest Chief #4 to cross the weakened bridge at 90 mph and derail.
- 1999 Bourbonnais, Illinois, train crash; 11 killed plus 122 injured

== 21st century ==
=== 2000s ===
- 2002 Minot train derailment, Minot, North Dakota; 1 killed plus hundreds made ill
- 2002 Placentia train collision, Placentia, California; 2 killed plus 141 injured
- 2004 Macdona rail disaster, Macdona, Texas; 3 killed plus ~50 sickened
- 2005 Graniteville train crash, Graniteville, South Carolina; 9 killed plus hundreds made ill. Possibly South Carolina's deadliest rail disaster to date
- 2005 Metra Rock Island derailment, Chicago, Illinois; 2 killed plus 83 injured
- 2008 Massachusetts train collision, Newton, Massachusetts; 1 killed plus 12 injured
- 2008 Chatsworth train collision, Chatsworth, Los Angeles, California; 25 killed plus 135 injured
- 2009 June 2009 Washington Metro train collision, Washington, DC; 9 killed plus 80 injured
- 2009 Walt Disney World monorail accident, Walt Disney World Resort; 1 killed and 7 injured in what may be the first deadly train wreck to occur on Disney property

=== 2010s ===
- 2012 Midland train crash, Midland, Texas; 4 killed plus 16 injured
- 2013 December 2013 Spuyten Duyvil derailment, New York City; 4 killed plus 61 injured
- 2015 Valhalla train crash, Valhalla, New York; 6 killed plus 15 injured
- 2015 Oxnard train derailment, Oxnard, California; 1 killed plus 29 injured
- 2015 Philadelphia train derailment, Philadelphia, Pennsylvania; 8 killed plus hundreds injured
- 2016 Chester, Pennsylvania, train derailment; 2 killed plus 31 injured
- 2016 Hoboken train crash, Hoboken, New Jersey; 1 killed plus 114 injured
- 2017 Washington train derailment, DuPont, Washington; 3 killed plus 62 injured
- 2017 Brooklyn train crash, Brooklyn, New York; 103 injured
- 2018 Cayce, South Carolina train collision; 2 killed plus 116 injured

=== 2020s ===
- 2021 Montana train derailment, Joplin, Montana; 3 killed and 49 injured.
- 2022 Missouri train derailment, Mendon, Missouri; 4 killed and 150 injured.
- 2023 Ohio train derailment, East Palestine, Ohio. 7 directly injured, and hundreds of nearby residents eventually developed symptoms of varying illnesses

== See also ==
- Lists of rail accidents
- List of rail accidents by country
- List of disasters in the United States by death toll
- BNSF Railway accidents and incidents
