= In Depth =

- Country of origin: United States
- Original language: English

Original release
- Network: C-SPAN 2
- Release: February 6, 2000 – December 3, 2023

In Depth is a program on C-SPAN 2 as part of their Book TV programming that aired monthly from 2000-2023, featuring a different writer each month. Each interview covers the breadth of that author's writing career, and incorporates viewer calls and e-mails. The show was typically broadcast live the first Sunday of each month. The first program was on February 6, 2000, and was a discussion with historian John Lukacs. For the first several years of the show, episodes were not produced during the summer months. From the first episode through March 2019, the standard interview length was three hours. Beginning in April 2019, with Nomi Prins, the standard interview was reduced to two hours.

There have been a few exceptions to the practice of featuring one single author, as with the programs featuring the Strand Bookstore, Frank J. Williams Frank Williams and Edna Greene Medford's discussion of Bibliography of Abraham Lincoln (writings on Lincoln), and John K. Wilson and Jonathan Karp's discussions of the writings of Barack Obama and John McCain.

Sometimes, the profile will include taped footage of the author's own home or office, so as to give further perspective on how they approach the task of writing. On occasion (as with the programs with Shelby Foote and Harold Bloom) entire three-hour interviews have been conducted live at the home or office of the featured author.

In 2018, the series featured 12 authors best known for their works of fiction, as opposed to their standard practice of interviewing authors best known for nonfiction works.

== List of episodes ==
Note: The dates of original broadcast of each episode are listed below, along with the name of the featured guest. The name of the host is indicated in parentheses. Each date links to a video of the full interview.

=== 2000 ===
- February 6 – John Lukacs (Connie Doebele)
- March 5 – Richard Rhodes (Connie Doebele)
- April 2 – William F. Buckley Jr. (Brian Lamb)
- May 7 – Joan Didion (Connie Doebele)
- September 3 – Milton Friedman (Brian Lamb)
- October 1 – Gore Vidal (Susan Swain)
- November 5 – Stephen Ambrose (Connie Doebele)
- December 3 – Arthur Schlesinger Jr. (Brian Lamb)

=== 2001 ===
- January 7 – Norman Podhoretz (Connie Doebele)
- February 4 – Toni Morrison (Susan Swain)
- March 4 – James McPherson (Connie Doebele)
- April 1 – Studs Terkel (Steve Scully)
- May 6 – Jacques Barzun (Connie Doebele)
- September 2 – Shelby Foote (Brian Lamb)
- October 7 – Richard Brookhiser (Connie Doebele)*
- November 4 – David Halberstam (Susan Swain)
- December 2 – David McCullough (Brian Lamb)

*Note: Richard Brookhiser's October 7 interview was cut short unexpectedly due to the beginning of Operation Enduring Freedom in Afghanistan, which started during his interview. Brookhiser later appeared on In Depth for a full three hours on April 1, 2012, thus becoming one of the only guests to make two appearances.

=== 2002 ===
- January 6 – Cornel West (Connie Doebele)
- February 3 – Tom Clancy (Steve Scully)
- March 3 – Peggy Noonan (Susan Swain)
- April 7 – Robert Caro (Brian Lamb)
- May 5 – bell hooks (Connie Doebele)
- June 2 – David Herbert Donald (Steve Scully)
- September 1 – Howard Zinn (Steve Scully)
- October 6 – Edmund Morris (Susan Swain)
- November 3 – George Will (Brian Lamb)
- December 1 – Bob Woodward (Susan Swain)

=== 2003 ===
- January 5 – Phyllis Schlafly (Connie Doebele)
- February 2 – Martin Gilbert (Connie Doebele)
- March 2 – Susan Sontag (Susan Swain)
- April 6 – Bernard Lewis (Steve Scully)
- May 4 – Harold Bloom (Susan Swain)
- June 1 – Noam Chomsky (Brian Lamb)
- July 6 – Carlo D'Este (Connie Doebele)
- August 3 – Camille Paglia (Connie Doebele)
- September 7 – Jeff Shaara (Steve Scully)
- October 5 – Stanley Crouch (Susan Swain)
- November 2 – John Keegan (Brian Lamb)
- December 3 – Douglas Brinkley (Steve Scully)

=== 2004 ===
- January 4 – Thomas Fleming (Connie Doebele)
- February 1 – Ken Auletta (Brian Lamb)
- March 7 – Victor Davis Hanson (Connie Doebele)
- April 4 – Margaret Macmillan (Connie Doebele)
- May 2 – Niall Ferguson (Connie Doebele)
- June 6 – Harold Holzer (Steve Scully)
- July 4 – Forrest McDonald (Connie Doebele)
- August 1 – Simon Winchester (Connie Doebele)
- September 5 – Strand Bookstore (Brian Lamb)
- October 3 – Angela Davis (Connie Doebele)
- November 7 – David Hackett Fischer (Connie Doebele)
- December 5 – Tom Wolfe (Brian Lamb)

=== 2005 ===
- January 2 – Garry Wills (Connie Doebele)
- February 6 – Charles Murray (Steve Scully)
- March 6 – Helen Caldicott (Connie Doebele)
- April 3 – Robert Kaplan (Peter Slen)
- May 1 – Thomas Friedman (Susan Swain)
- June 5 – Richard John Neuhaus (Peter Slen)
- July 3 – H.W. Brands (Connie Doebele)
- August 7 – William Least Heat-Moon (Connie Doebele)
- September 4 – Harvey Mansfield (Connie Doebele)
- October 2 – Sherwin Nuland (Peter Slen)
- November 6 – Doris Kearns Goodwin (Steve Scully)
- December 4 – John Updike (Susan Swain)

=== 2006 ===
- January 1 – Ron Powers (Connie Doebele)
- February 5 – Taylor Branch (Susan Swain)
- March 5 – Francis Fukuyama (Connie Doebele)
- April 2 – Shelby Steele (Peter Slen)
- May 7 – Robert Remini (Steve Scully)
- June 4 – Mark Bowden (Susan Swain)
- July 2 – Joyce Appleby (Connie Doebele)
- August 6 – Gary Gallagher (Steve Scully)
- September 3 – Tammy Bruce (Peter Slen)
- October 1 – John Hope Franklin (Peter Slen)
- November 6 – Ray Kurzweil (Pedro Echevarria)
- December 3 – Jimmy Carter (Connie Doebele)

=== 2007 ===
- January 7 – P.J. O'Rourke (Peter Slen)
- February 4 – Dinesh D'Souza (Connie Doebele)
- March 4 – Barbara Ehrenreich (Connie Doebele)
- April 1 – Alexander Cockburn (Connie Doebele)
- May 6 – Marvin Olasky (Connie Doebele)
- June 3 – Lewis Lapham (Connie Doebele)
- July 1 – Michael Barone (Connie Doebele)
- August 5 – Edward O. Wilson (Pedro Echevarria)
- September 2 – Christopher Hitchens (Peter Slen)
- October 7 – David Horowitz (Connie Doebele)
- November 4 – Vincent Bugliosi (Peter Slen)
- December 2 – Newt Gingrich (Susan Swain)

=== 2008 ===
- January 6 – Nell Irvin Painter (Connie Doebele)
- February 3 – David Levering Lewis (Peter Slen)
- March 2 – John McWhorter (Peter Slen)
- April 6 – Michael Eric Dyson (Pedro Echevarria)
- May 4 – Alice Walker (Peter Slen)
- June 1 – George Weigel (Connie Doebele)
- July 6 – Katha Pollitt (Pedro Echevarria)
- August 3 – Ralph Peters (Steve Scully)
- September 7 – John K. Wilson and Jonathan Karp (Peter Slen)
- November 2 – Steven Pinker (Connie Doebele)
- December 7 – Kevin Phillips (Peter Slen)

=== 2009 ===
From this point forward, all interviews were hosted by Peter Slen, unless otherwise indicated.

- January 4 – Bill Gertz
- February 1 – Frank Williams and Edna Greene Medford
- February 28 – Ronald Takaki (Pedro Echevarria)
- April 5 – Robert Higgs
- May 3 – Christopher Buckley
- June 7 – Bill Ayers
- July 5 – John Ferling (Susan Swain)
- August 2 – Juan Williams (Steve Scully)
- September 6 – Jonathan Kozol (Connie Doebele)
- October 4 – Hugh Hewitt
- November 1 – Temple Grandin
- December 6 – Joy Hakim

=== 2010 ===
- January 3 – Michelle Malkin
- February 7 – Paul Johnson
- March 7 – T.R. Reid
- April 4 – John Dean (Steve Scully)
- May 2 – Pat Buchanan
- June 6 – Martha Nussbaum
- July 4 – Bill Bennett (Pedro Echevarria)
- August 1 – Ralph Nader
- September 5 – Gordon Wood
- October 3 – Michio Kaku
- November 7 – Jonah Goldberg
- December 5 – Salman Rushdie

=== 2011 ===
- January 2 – Phyllis Bennis
- February 6 – R. Emmett Tyrell
- March 6 – Pauline Maier
- April 3 – Ishmael Reed
- May 1 – Tibor Machan (Susan Swain)
- June 5 – Eric Posner
- July 3 – Linda Hogan
- August 7 – Ann Coulter
- August 10 – Ellis Cose
- October 2 – Michael Moore
- November 6 – Ben Mezrich
- December 4 – David Brooks (Steve Scully)

=== 2012 ===
- January 1 – Chris Hedges
- February 5 – Mark Steyn
- March 4 – Randall Kennedy
- April 1 – Richard Brookhiser
- May 6 – Tom Brokaw
- June 3 – Anna Quindlen
- July 1 – David Pietrusza
- August 1 – Julianne Malveaux
- September 2 – Michael Beschloss
- October 7 – Steven Johnson
- November 4 – Kenneth Davis
- December 2 – Tom Coburn

=== 2013 ===
- January 6 – Donald Barlett and James Steele
- February 3 – Randall Robinson
- March 3 – Larry Schweikart
- April 7 – Amy Goodman
- May 5 – Melanie Phillips
- June 2 – Rick Atkinson
- July 7 – Mary Roach
- August 4 – Ben Carson
- September 1 – Ben Shapiro
- October 6 – John Lewis
- November 3 – Kitty Kelley
- December 1 – Christina Hoff Sommers

=== 2014 ===
- January 5 – Mark Levin
- February 2 – Bonnie Morris
- March 2 – Peniel Joseph
- April 6 – Bing West
- May 4 – Luis J. Rodriguez
- June 1 – Amity Shlaes
- July 6 – Reza Aslan
- August 3 – Ron Paul
- September 7 – Mary Frances Berry
- October 5 – Joan Biskupic
- November 2 – Michael Korda
- December 7 – Arthur Brooks

=== 2015 ===
- January 4 – Tavis Smiley
- February 1 – Walter Isaacson
- March 1 – Lani Guinier
- April 5 – Ronald Kessler
- May 3 – Jon Ronson
- June 7 – Lawrence Wright
- July 5 – Peter Schweizer (Steve Scully)
- August 2 – Medea Benjamin
- September 6 – Lynne Cheney
- October 4 – Thom Hartmann
- November 1 – Walter Williams
- December 6 – Cokie Roberts

=== 2016 ===
- January 3 – David Maraniss
- February 7 – Eric Burns
- March 6 – Jane Mayer
- April 3 – Steve Forbes*
- May 1 – Wil Haygood
- June 5 – Steve Forbes*
- July 3 – Sebastian Junger
- August 7 – Jeffrey Toobin (Steve Scully)
- September 4 – Dennis Prager
- October 2 – Gerald Horne
- November 6 – Kate Andersen Brower, William Seale, and Alvin S. Felzenberg, discussing U.S. presidents
- December 4 – Steve Twomey, Eri Hotta, and Craig Nelson, discussing the Attack on Pearl Harbor

*Note: Steve Forbes was scheduled to be the guest for three hours on April 3, but on the way to Washington, D.C. that morning he was a passenger on Amtrak train #89, which derailed near Chester, Pennsylvania. Forbes was unhurt and returned to New York. Just after noon Eastern Time, he spoke via telephone with C-SPAN host Steve Scully for approximately 14 minutes about that experience. After the interview, C-SPAN 2 aired a program recorded June 18, 2014, in which Forbes discusses his book Money at a Washington, D.C. bookstore. Forbes eventually was an In Depth guest for a full three hours on June 5, 2016.

=== 2017 ===
- January 1, 2017 – April Ryan, Eddie Glaude, and David Maraniss on the Presidency of Barack Obama (Steve Scully)
- February 5, 2017 – Nick Adams
- March 5, 2017 – Dave Barry
- April 2, 2017 – Annie Jacobsen
- May 7, 2017 – Neil deGrasse Tyson
- June 4, 2017 – Matt Taibbi
- July 2, 2017 – Herb Boyd
- August 6, 2017 – KrisAnne Hall
- September 3, 2017 – Eric Metaxas
- October 1, 2017 – Lynne Olson
- November 5, 2017 – Michael Lewis (Steve Scully)
- December 3, 2017 – Cornel West and Robert George

=== 2018 ===
For 2018, the program broke its tradition of interviewing nonfiction authors to interview best-selling fiction writers, focusing on authors of historical fiction, science and national security thrillers, and social commentary. The phrase “2018 Fiction Edition” was added to the show’s logo.

- January 7, 2018 – David Ignatius
- February 4, 2018 – Colson Whitehead
- March 4, 2018 – Jeff Shaara
- April 1, 2018 – Walter Mosley (Greta Brawner)
- May 6, 2018 – David Baldacci (Susan Swain)
- June 3, 2018 – Gish Jen
- July 1, 2018 – Brad Thor
- August 5, 2018 – Cory Doctorow (Pedro Echevarria)
- September 2, 2018 – Jacqueline Woodson
- October 7, 2018 – Geraldine Brooks
- November 4, 2018 – Jodi Picoult
- December 2, 2018 – Brad Meltzer (Steve Scully)

=== 2019 ===
- January 6, 2019 – David Corn
- February 3, 2019 – Dave Zirin
- March 3, 2019 – Heather Mac Donald
- April 7, 2019 – Nomi Prins
- May 5, 2019 – Kathleen Hall Jamieson
- June 2, 2019 – Evan Thomas
- July 7, 2019 – Paul Kengor
- August 4, 2019 – Lee Edwards
- September 1, 2019 – Joanne Freeman
- October 6, 2019 – Naomi Klein (Steve Scully)
- November 3, 2019 – Imani Perry
- December 1, 2019 – Jason Riley (Steve Scully)

=== 2020 ===
- January 5, 2020 – Sebastian Gorka
- February 2, 2020 – Deirdre McCloskey
- March 1, 2020 – April Ryan
- April 1, 2020 – Highlights show
- May 3, 2020 – Highlights show
- June 7, 2020 – Yuval Levin
- July 5, 2020 – James Stavridis
- August 2, 2020 – Wes Moore
- September 6, 2020 – Ralph Reed
- October 4, 2020 – Jill Lepore
- November 1, 2020 – 20th Anniversary Commemoration
- December 6, 2020 – Eddie Glaude

=== 2021 ===
- January 2, 2021 – N/A
- February 7, 2021 – Robert W. Merry
- March 7, 2021 – Elizabeth Kolbert
- April 4, 2021 – Harriet Washington
- May 2, 2021 – Craig Shirley*
- June 6, 2021 – Max Hastings
- July 4, 2021 – Annette Gordon-Reed
- August 2021 - None#
- September 5, 2021 – Carol Swain
- October 3, 2021 – Roxanne Dunbar-Ortiz
- November 7, 2021 - Ross Douthat
- December 5, 2021 - Victor Davis Hanson

*Author Ross Douthat was announced as the scheduled guest for this date several times during the previous week. Ronald Reagan biographer Craig Shirley appeared instead. No explanation was given for the change. The C-SPAN web page announcing Douthat's appearance (May 2, 2021) was still retrievable on May 3, 2021, the day following the broadcast with Shirley. Mr. Douthat appeared in a later episode on November 7, 2021.

#Former independent counsel, U.S. solicitor general, and federal judge Ken Starr was supposed to appear on the program on August 1, 2021, but the episode was preempted when the U.S. Senate held a rare Sunday session to debate a spending bill. He was never rescheduled to appear.

=== 2022 ===
- January 2, 2022 –- Allen Guelzo
- February 6, 2022 -- Sheryll Cashin
- March 2022—None*
- April 5, 2022 -- Noam Chomsky
- May 1, 2022 -- Lawrence Kudlow
- June 5, 2022 -- Sam Quinones
- July 3, 2022 -- Carol Anderson
- August 7, 2022 -- Larry Elder
- September 4, 2022 -- Steven Hayward (John McArdle)
- October 2, 2022 -- Dan Abrams
- November 6, 2022 -- Mark Updegrove
- December 4, 2022 -- Peter Baker and Susan Glasser

*Author Sam Quinones was scheduled to appear on March 5, 2022, but communication between C-SPAN'S Washington, DC studio and Mr. Quinones's studio in Nashville, Tennessee could not be established. He appeared on a later episode aired June 5, 2022.

=== 2023 ===
- January 1, 2023 –- Chris Hedges
- February 5, 2023 -- Lance Morrow
- March 5, 2023 -- Jeff Guinn
- April 2, 2023 -- Stacy Schiff
- May 7, 2023 -- Philip K. Howard
- June 6, 2023 -- David Quammen
- July 2, 2023 -- Francis Fukuyama
- August 6, 2023 -- S.C. Gwynne
- September 3, 2023 -- Mary Eberstadt
- October 1, 2023 -- Douglas Rushkoff (John McArdle)
- November 5, 2023 -- Nadine Strossen
- December 3, 2023 -- John Yoo
