= Henry Rosovsky =

American economist (1927–2022)

Dean of the Harvard Faculty of Arts and Sciences
- In office 1973–1984
- Preceded by: John Thomas Dunlop; Franklin Ford (acting)
- Succeeded by: Michael Spence

Personal details
- Born: September 1, 1927 Free City of Danzig, (modern Gdansk, Poland)
- Died: November 11, 2022 (aged 95) Cambridge, Massachusetts, U.S.
- Spouse: Nitza
- Children: 3
- Education: A.B. College of William and Mary, PhD Harvard University
- Occupation: Professor, college administrator

Henry A. Rosovsky (September 1, 1927 – November 11, 2022) was an American economist and academic administrator who served as Dean of the Faculty of Arts and Sciences of Harvard University, and occasionally as its acting president. After a career as an economic historian specializing in East Asia, and Japan in particular—where he served Harvard as professor of economics, then chair of its Department of Economics, and finally the Geyser University Professorship Emeritus—Rosovsky was named Dean of the Harvard Faculty of Arts and Sciences (FAS) in 1973 by Harvard President Derek Bok. He continued to serve as Dean from 1973 to 1984, and again, as acting dean, in a period ending on July 1, 1991. He served as acting president of Harvard in 1984 and 1987. In those roles, he is cited for a variety of strong contributions, including in the support for developing quality academic and other programs for African American and Jewish studies and students. In 1985, Rosovsky became a member of Harvard's governing body, the Harvard Corporation, a position he served in until 1997. He was the first Harvard faculty member to do so in a century.

== Early life ==
Henry Rosovsky was born on September 1, 1927 in the Free City of Danzig, now Gdańsk, Poland, to Selik and Sonia Rosovsky, Russian Jewish immigrant parents. Rosovsky grew up speaking Russian and German, and French as well. The Rosovsky's fled Danzig on the eve of Nazi Germany's 1939 invasion of Poland, making their way "first to Belgium and then to France, Spain and Portugal", before departing for New York. Rosovsky, then 13, arrived in the United States in 1940 with his family, his mother remaining at home and his father—who had been "a lawyer in pre-revolutionary Russia"—entering business to deal in lumber. Henry then received his secondary education at Cherry Lawn School in Darien, Connecticut.

After Cherry Lawn, Rosovsky began a U.S. Army enlistment that led to his presence with the Counterintelligence Corps, during part of the Nuremberg trials of Nazis for war crimes (1946-1947). He entered the College of William & Mary in Williamsburg, Virginia, with his education paid by the G.I. Bill, graduating in 1949 with an A.B.. That same year, Rosovsky was naturalized as a U.S. citizen. He returned to the Army, serving in the Korean War from 1950 to 1952, eventful service that saw him receiving a Purple Heart after experiencing frostbitten feet, and final deployment to a Japanese listening station "to monitor Soviet broadcasts". After the Army, he returned to academic studies, earning a master's degree in 1953, and doctorate in 1959, both from Harvard.

== Career ==
=== Professorships ===
Rosovsky taught economics, history and Japanese studies at the University of California at Berkeley until 1965. After joining Harvard that year, he continued to specialise in East Asia, and began serving as a Harvard professor of economics, going on to become chair of its Department of Economics, and then as the Lewis P and Linda L Geyser University Professorship Emeritus. Rosovsky taught as a visiting professor in Japan and Israel.

In 2000, Rosovsky chaired a Task Force, convened by the World Bank and UNESCO, on Higher Education and Society (with Mamphela Ramphele). The Task Force was convened to explore the future of higher education in developing countries; its report, Peril and Promise, argued that higher education systems in poor countries are in crisis and made a case for renewed investment, curricular reform and improved standards of governance.

In addition to consulting with the World Bank, and UNESCO. he served in similar capacities with the United States government, and the Asian Development Bank.

=== Administrative roles ===
After a career as an economic historian, Rosovsky was named a Harvard dean in 1973 by Harvard President Derek Bok. He served as Dean of the Faculty of Arts and Sciences (FAS) from 1973 to 1984, and again, as acting dean, in a period ending on July 1, 1991. He also served as acting president of Harvard in 1984 and 1987.

In 1985, Rosovsky became a member of the Harvard Corporation, the "seven-person board that runs the school", a position he served in until 1997. He was the first Harvard faculty member to do so in a century.

==== Role in creating Afro-American Studies at Harvard ====
Henry Louis Gates Jr., a long term director of Harvard’s early 21st century Hutchins Center for African and African American Research, described Professor Rosovsky to The New York Times in 2022 as

one of the first administrators to see African American studies not as ethnic window dressing, but as a bold and innovative addition to the core mission of a liberal arts university, a long-suppressed body of knowledge that would enrich our understanding of the humanities, the arts and the social sciences.

He further attributed the success of the Harvard department in its field to Rosovsky's "vision and his commitment of the resources necessary to implement that vision”. Rosovsky's role began in the wake of Martin Luther King Jr.'s 1968 assassination, after which a group of Black students at Harvard demanded increased recruitment of Black students and faculty, and creation of an endowed chair for a Black professor. A "hastily organized course on Black culture" was rejected as inadequate, leading to the seating of a faculty panel that included Rosovsky, consultations with the students, and the panel's recommendation in January 1969 that Harvard "establish a degree-granting program in Black studies... [not] the first such program in the country, but, because it was Harvard... front-page news". When efforts by the student group, now expanding to include what Sam Roberts of The New York Times described as an element of "[c]ampus radicals", led to administrative acquiescence giving students "a role in hiring teachers and shaping... curriculum", Rosovsky left the panel in protest (again making front page news). The Department continued on without him, per Roberts' description, as "an underachieving [Harvard] stepchild", until in 1991, Rosovsky and Harvard President Derek Bok, at the end of their administrative roles, succeeded in the recruitment of Gates Jr. to Harvard (from Duke University).

=== Harvard Hillel ===
Rosovsky was active in Harvard Hillel throughout his time at Harvard. Home of the Riesman Center for Harvard Hillel, Rosovsky Hall was named after Dean Rosovsky. Commissioned in 1993 for a structure on the corner of Mt. Auburn and Plympton Streets, Rosovsky Hall was designed by Israeli-born architect, urban planner, educator, theorist, and author Moshe Safdie.

THe building's groundbreaking occurred on March 17, 1993, and its dedication on May 1, 1994. Its naming for him was in recognition of his leadership in the university's Jewish life, and to acknowledge his role as the first Jewish member of the Harvard Corporation, the university's highest governing body. On the event of the 25th anniversary of the building, and Rosovsky's 90th birthday, a celebration of the building and its namesake took place there.

== Publications ==
Rosovsky is the author of the scholarly works, Capital Formation in Japan (1961), Quantitative Japanese Economic History (1961), and Japanese Economic Growth (with K. Ohkawa, 1973).

He also wrote the popular work, The University: An Owner's Manual (1990). Thomas Short of Commentary magazine praised The University as "a cozy book" in which Rosovsky, with "a humorous, relentlessly self-deprecating manner," shares "many anecdotes from his own career in higher education."

Rosovsky also served as editor for the following collections:

- Industrialization in Two Systems (1961);
- Discord in the Pacific (1972);
- Asia's New Giant: How the Japanese Economy Works (with H. Patrick, 1976);
- Favorites of Fortune (with P. Higonnet and D. Landes, 1991); and
- The Political Economy of Japan: Cultural and Social Dynamics (with Shumpei Kumon, 1992).

== Awards and recognition ==
Rosovsky was long a member of the American Academy of Arts and Sciences (since 1969).

In 1981, Rosovsky received the Encyclopædia Britannica Achievement in Life Award "for achievement in education". The government of France made him a Chevalier of the Legion of Honour in 1984. In 1987, he was recognized by the Council of the American Academy of Achievement with the Golden Plate Award. Rosovsky has been a member of the American Philosophical Society since 1987 as well. In 1988 he was awarded the Order of the Sacred Treasure (Star) by the Government of Japan.

In 1992 Rosovsky received the Clark Kerr Medal for service to Higher Education from the University of California at Berkeley.

== Personal life ==
Henry Rosovsky was married to an author, and former Harvard Museum of the Ancient Near East curator (now retired), Nitza Rosovsky. Together they had three children, Leah, a daughter; and Judith and Michael.

With renewed attention to the information held by the U.S. government on the crimes of the late Jeffrey Epstein (convicted in 2008 of a sexual offense against a minor), and the U.S. House release, in response to a subpoena—of the contents of Epstein's 2003 "birthday book" (50th birthday collection organised by Ghislaine Maxwell)—reports are appearing that alongside President Donald Trump, a variety of further business and other figures contributed to the book, including Bill Clinton, Alan Dershowitz, Leslie Wexner, and many more. The contributions included one from Henry Rosovsky, "a short handwritten note that read, 'For the man who has almost everything—but never enough of these!'" (Epstein and Leslie Wexner were among a very small set of donors that had, on Rosovsky's encouragement, in 1991 pledged US$2-million for the construction of a new building for the Hillel organisation at Harvard.) Per the same sources' reporting (AP, WSJ), Rosovsky's contribution to Epstein's book included images purporting to be prints of a woman's breasts, labeled as "specially commissioned by Henry Rosovsky". Rosovsky was, according to Epstein, his "best friend" "FBI investigation documents" (PDF)..

Rosovsky died from cancer in Cambridge, Massachusetts, on November 11, 2022, at the age of 95.

== Further reading, viewing, and listening ==
- HH Staff (September 9, 2025). "Celebration of Henry Rosovsky's 90th and Rosovsky Hall's 25th". Hillel.Harvard.edu. Cambridge, MA: Harvard Hillel (HH). This event posting includes two audiovisual pieces of potential interest with regard to the history of Rosovsky at Harvard.
- Roberts, Sam (November 16, 2022). "Henry Rosovsky, Who Redefined Harvard to Its Core, Dies at 95". The New York Times.
- HG Staff (November 16, 2022). "Henry Rosovsky, Former Acting University President, FAS Dean, Dead at 95". The Harvard Gazette (HG). Cambridge, MA: Harvard University.
- Dawidoff, Nicholas (July–August 2002). "Tough Love". Harvard Magazine. This citation contains substantial biographical information on Henry Roskovsky, as yet uncited herein.
- Bronfenbrenner, Martin; Minabe, Shigeo & Yasuba, Yasukichi (1977). "Asia's New Giant: Two Reviews [Reviewed Work—Asia's New Giant: How the Japanese Economy Works by Hugh Patrick, Henry Rosovsky]". Journal of Japanese Studies. 3 (1, Winter). Oakland, CA: University of California Press: 145–167. JSTOR 132016.
