= Macdona rail disaster =

2004 rail accident

Coordinates: 29°19′40″N 98°40′21″W

At approximately 05:03 (CST) (11:03 GMT) on June 28, 2004 in Macdona, Texas, a Union Pacific train collided with a Burlington Northern train resulting in a large derailment. Three people died and 50 others were made ill due to the large amounts of chlorine (60 tons) and ammonium nitrate which was released.

== Aftermath ==
The victims of the crash were Heath Pape, 23, Lois Koerber, 59 and Gene Hale, 85.

== See also ==
- Minot train derailment
- Graniteville train crash
