= Washington Journal =

American political call-in and interview television program

- Genre: News and public affairs
- Theme music composer: Johann Melchior Molter
- Opening theme: Trumpet Concerto No. 2 Movement 3
- Country of origin: United States
- Original language: English

Production
- Production locations: Washington, D.C., U.S.
- Running time: 180 minutes

Original release
- Network: C-SPAN
- Release: January 4, 1995 – present

The Washington Journal is an American television series on the C-SPAN television network in the format of a political call-in and interview program. The program features elected officials, government administrators, and journalists as guests, answering questions from the hosts and from members of the general public who call into the studio or submit questions via e-mail and social media.

The three-hour program airs every day of the year, beginning at 7 a.m. Eastern Time, except when special events or coverage of Congress preempt all or part of the program. The audio of the program also airs on WCSP-FM as a simulcast with the television broadcast.

== Background and production ==
=== History ===
The Washington Journal's antecedent is the C-SPAN daily call-in, a fixture of the network since October 7, 1980. The inaugural the Washington Journal program aired on January 4, 1995, and the program continues to be shown on C-SPAN in its original time slot. Saturday and Sunday editions were originally just two hours long; on January 20, 2001, they were expanded to a full three hours.

Simulcasts of the Washington Journal on C-SPAN's radio station, WCSP-FM, began on October 9, 1997; it was the first program to be broadcast on the station. One hour of the Sunday edition of Washington Journal is also simulcast on BBC Parliament in the United Kingdom, preceded by America This Week, an hour of recorded C-SPAN programming.

=== Format ===
The Washington Journal host Greta Brawner interviews Adm. Thad Allen, USCG (Ret.), on May 26, 2010.

At the beginning of each program, the host reads noteworthy articles and editorials from current newspapers and periodicals as viewers discuss a timely topic chosen by C-SPAN. The program occasionally features "open phones" segments when callers may discuss any topic of their choosing. In multiple segments following, the host interviews guests invited to discuss a specific political or legislative issue and takes calls from the public. Most guests appear in C-SPAN's Washington or New York City studios, while some guests are interviewed from remote locations.

The program is noted for the participation of its viewers, who may call in, submit questions and comments via e-mail, or, since March 5, 2009, Twitter. As facilitators of conversation between the public and C-SPAN guests, Washington Journal hosts do not offer their own perspective on issues and leave more pointed questions to callers, though they will occasionally ask for clarifications from callers and guests. Consistent with its emphasis on reflecting a wide variety of viewpoints, C-SPAN aims to take approximately 60 calls in each program, and roughly 20,000 calls per year.

In the early days of the Washington Journal, callers were not screened by ideology. This was changed at the recommendation of University of Maryland professor John Splaine, hired by C-SPAN to ensure the network's objectivity, who noticed that C-SPAN received a disproportionate number of calls from conservative viewers. Washington Journal producers now set up separate phone lines by party affiliation (Democrats, Republicans, and Independents) and take alternate calls from each line. In some cases, a dedicated call-in line is made available for the international audience (outside the U.S. and Canada) or for a particular group of callers. For example, a program about college tuition may have a line for students and recent graduates. In the fall of 2006, the Washington Journal recorded two shows in New Orleans and set up a call-in line for locals to tell their stories from Hurricane Katrina and its aftermath.

=== Production ===
The show is hosted from C-SPAN's Washington, D.C., studio overlooking the Capitol Building and is hosted by a revolving set of hosts. In November 2009, C-SPAN named veteran television news producer Michele Remillard as executive producer of the Washington Journal.

The Washington Journal theme music is the third movement of Concerto for Trumpet, Mo. 2 by Johann Melchior Molter (1696-1765), played at various points during each broadcast. The theme is used as introductory music, as an interlude during transitions, and is played again as the program concludes.

A video simulcast of the C-SPAN Radio studio has been shown during transitions at the top of an hour, with the radio host reading the day's news headlines. The program airs 365 days a year. The Washington Journal, until 2016, had no time-delay, which often resulted in callers uttering profane and offensive language over the air. In 2016, Washington Journal implemented a 3-second delay to combat these callers. In 2018, following an incident in which a caller made racist remarks about then-President Barack Obama, the delay was increased to seven seconds.

Washington Journal host Mimi Geerges talks with Rep. Tom McClintock on March 12, 2025.

Callers are asked to wait 30 days between phoning in, though this rule is pointed out to be violated by the program's regular viewers occasionally.

== Notable guests and events ==
For several days following the September 11 attacks, the Washington Journal began at 6 a.m. instead of 7 a.m. Following Hurricane Katrina, the Washington Journal frequently featured discussions on the issue of New Orleans' recovery. On August 21 and 22, 2006, a remote broadcast was set up in the city to interview key players, including U.S. senators David Vitter and Mary Landrieu, and local homeowners.

Among C-SPAN's primarily anonymous callers, recording artist and entertainer Cher made waves by calling into the show on October 27, 2003. Although she intended to call anonymously, host Peter Slen correctly guessed her identity, which she reluctantly admitted. She called again on May 28, 2006, and waited on hold for her call to be taken. She then subsequently appeared on the program on June 14, 2006, to speak about Operation Helmet, a nonprofit organization providing helmet upgrades for U.S. soldiers.

== Notable hosts ==
=== Current ===
- Kimberly Adams
- Greta Brawner
- Pedro Echevarria
- Mimi Geerges
- Jesse J. Holland
- John McArdle
- Taylor Popielarz
- Peter Slen
- Tammy Thueringer

=== Former ===
- Brian Lamb, C-SPAN founder, former chairman and CEO
- Libby Casey (at the Washington Post)
- Carrie Collins
- Connie Doebele
- Robb Harleston, now serving as an editor
- Lew Ketcham
- Bill Scanlan
- Doug Johnson
- Paul Orgel
- Steve Scully (at the Bipartisan Policy Center)
- Susan Swain, now serving as C-SPAN CEO
