= Pauline Maier =

American historian (1938–2013)

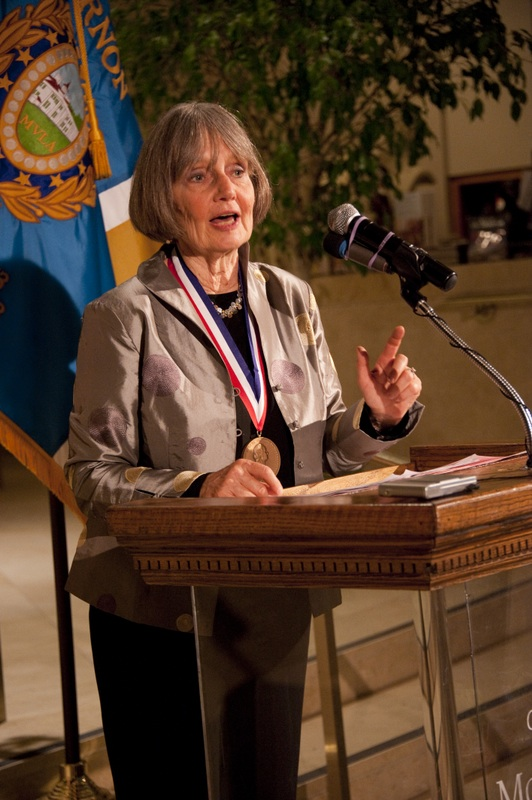
- Maier in 2011
- Born: Pauline Alice Rubbelke; April 27, 1938; St. Paul, Minnesota, U.S.
- Died: August 12, 2013 (aged 75); Cambridge, Massachusetts, U.S.
- Education: Radcliffe College (BA); London School of Economics; Harvard University (PhD)
- Occupation: Historian
- Known for: Interest in history and education
- Spouse: Charles S. Maier

Pauline Alice Maier (née Rubbelke; April 27, 1938 – August 12, 2013) was a historian of the American Revolution, whose work also addressed the late colonial period and the history of the United States after the end of the Revolutionary War. She was the William R. Kenan, Jr. Professor of American History at the Massachusetts Institute of Technology (MIT).

Maier achieved prominence over a fifty-year career for her scholarly histories and journal articles. She was a Fellow of the American Academy of Arts and Sciences. She taught undergraduates and authored textbooks and online courses. Her popular career included series with PBS and the History Channel. She appeared on Charlie Rose, C-SPAN2's In Depth and wrote for The New York Times review pages for 20 years. Maier was the 2011 President of the Society of American Historians. She won the 2011 George Washington Book Prize for her book Ratification: The People Debate the Constitution, 1787–1788.

== Early life and education ==
Born in St. Paul, Minnesota in 1938 as Pauline Rubbelke, she attended parochial schools. Her father was a firefighter and her mother was a homemaker with five children. On entering Radcliffe College as an undergraduate, her original ambition was to be in the newspaper business.

She was a writer on The Harvard Crimson and worked summers at the Patriot Ledger in Quincy, Massachusetts. She graduated from Radcliffe in 1960 with a bachelor's degree in history and literature. It was on the Crimson that she met her future husband, Charles S. Maier. After graduation, they both attended schools at Oxford on fellowships, she as a Fulbright Scholar at the London School of Economics and Political Science. After completing their studies, they married and toured Europe together.

The couple returned to Harvard University to pursue doctoral degrees, Charles in European history, and Pauline in 20th century urban studies in line with her interest in contemporary politics. But after taking Bernard Bailyn's "Colonial and Revolutionary America" seminar, she said, "Once you get into the 18th century, you never get out." Pauline and Charles earned their Ph.D. degrees at Harvard, and Charles began a career there. They raised two daughters and a son in Cambridge, Massachusetts. Maier pursued gardening and cooking at the family weekend home.

== Career ==
Maier taught at University of Massachusetts Boston for nine years, and one year at the University of Wisconsin-Madison before taking her position at Massachusetts Institute of Technology in 1978 as William R. Kenan, Jr. Professor of American History. Her career included appointments at five universities, and numerous fellowships and awards. Her lecture classes included three courses on early American history, and she co-taught "Riots, Strikes and Conspiracies in American History" with urban historian Robert M. Fogelson.

Maier chaired a university-wide committee at MIT in 1985 to reorganize its humanities schools and broaden and structure its programs. Its adopted recommendations expanded women's studies, awarded specific area degrees, and initiated a doctoral program joining history and anthropology under Dean Ann Fetter Friedlaender. MIT's faculty voted Maier the Killian Award in 1998, given annually to one senior faculty member for outstanding achievement. The recipient presents on their professional activities over their lecturer year.

In 1976, she became a member of the American Antiquarian Society. An offprint of its proceedings featured her "Boston and New York in the 18th Century" (1982).

In the 1990s, Maier was a charter member of "The Historical Society" group among American Historical Association membership who were concerned about restrictive political correctness and collegial civility. In 1998, Maier was elected a history fellow of the American Academy of Arts and Sciences. In 2010, she became one of two women honorary members of the Colonial Society of Massachusetts since 1947.

Maier was the 2011 President of the Society of American Historians (SAH), an affiliate of the American Historical Association. It is dedicated to literary distinction in history and biography.

In 2012, President Obama appointed Maier to the James Madison Memorial Fellowship Foundation Board of Trustees. The foundation was created by Congress in 1986 as part of the bicentennial celebration of the Constitution and offers graduate-level fellowships to secondary teachers to undertake a master's degree that emphasizes the study of the Constitution.

=== Writing ===
Maier's writing is characterized as serious and unadorned, with a crossover appeal from scholars to intelligent readers who enjoy a well-told story of well-researched scholarly history. In Ratification, Maier attributed her storytelling ability to Barbara Tuchman's insight that the writer can build suspense by never acknowledging a development until the characters in the narrative could know it.

Professionally, her research-writing technique was self-described as looking for something comparative to come up with new questions. For example, in American Scripture, she found over 90 local declarations and then compared them to that of the Second Continental Congress. Popular support for the Declaration of Independence was built on how much was known and how widely the newspapers circulated. Massachusetts did not control Virginia, there was a confluence of ideas, assumptions, and similar responses to similar events.

As a popular history writer, she sought to understand her subjects as humans as well as their causes. Personal elements may not be important to public life, but they are the kinds of things people want to know. In Hamilton's famous phrase, he was "unfaithful to my wife, but not to my country." Historians always ask, What did they do for the public?

=== Teaching teachers ===
Maier won fellowships to write curriculum for college courses and high school teachers. She believed that the interest in American history was not tapped in the curriculum of many states. As a democratic country, the U.S. should give any student a background knowledge of what happened to make the Declaration and the U.S. Constitution, and how their uses changed. Assumed things were not always so, students should understand how things can and do change. "Every time you understand what's distinctive about a different time, you are understanding what is distinctive about our time."

== Personal life and death ==
Maier met her husband Charles S. Maier at Harvard. After a year in England, they married and toured Europe together. Maier died in 2013 from lung cancer at the age of 75.

== Scholarship ==
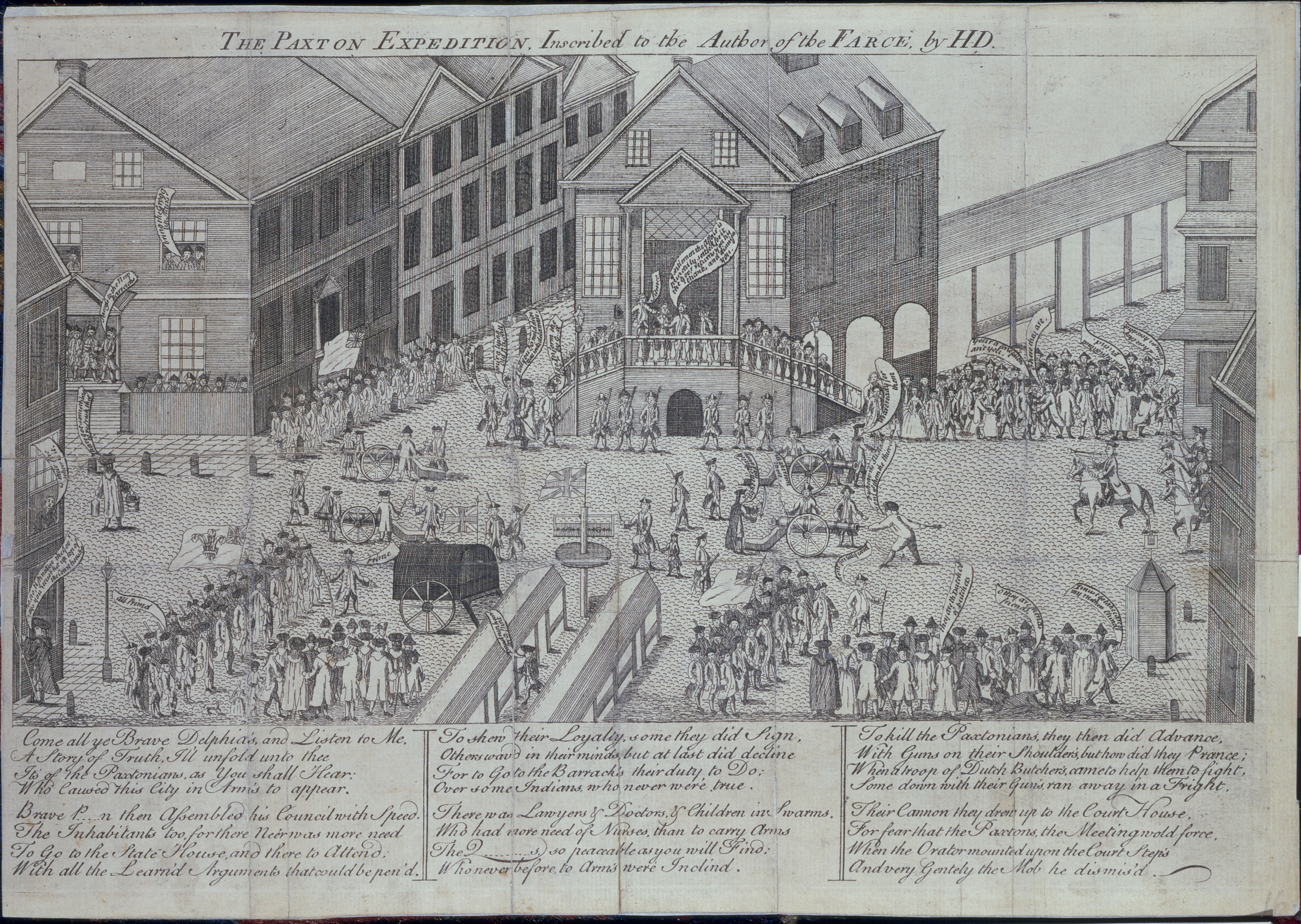
Paxton Boys at Phil. Disorderly "out-of-doors" disrupted cities. → From Resistance to Revolut'n

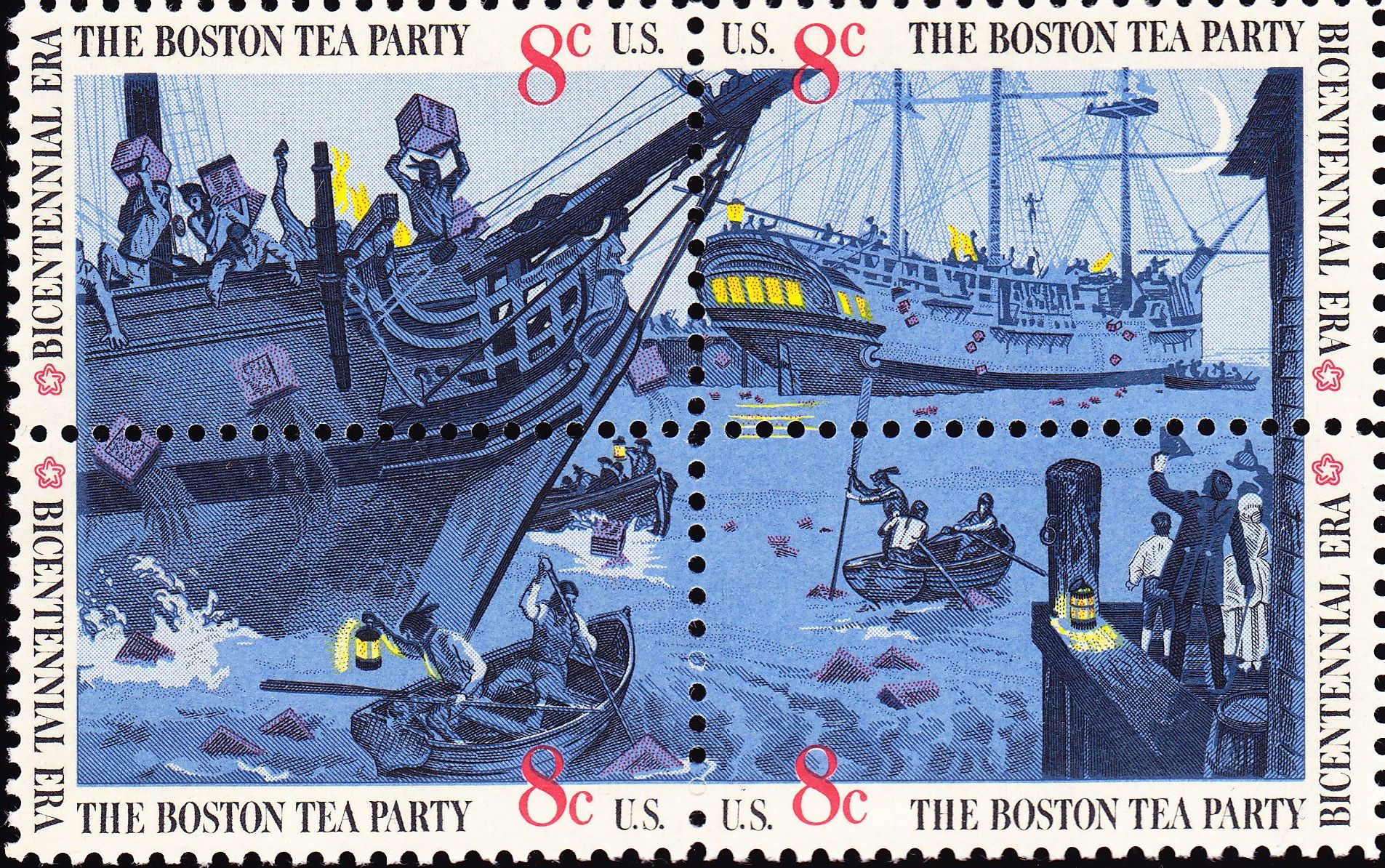
S. Adams wrote to Mass. Sons of Liberty, NY Liberty Boys on Tea Tax → Old Revolut'naries

Declaration Comte of Ma, Ct, NY, Pa, Va. Written in secret, then venerated, transformed → see Maier's American Scripture

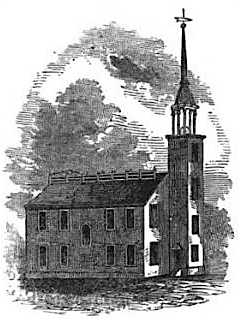
Mass. Convention moved to larger building for crowds, proceedings reported openly → Ratification: the People

The Neo-Whigs

Maier's scholarship belongs to the "Neo-Whig" school of historiography founded by Bernard Bailyn in reaction to the "Progressive" historians. Her work is likened to that of Gordon S. Wood and Edmund S. Morgan. Radical English libertarian thought changed American beliefs and society and culture. The spreading ideas of natural rights and individual liberty distinctively altered politics, economy and society. These are explained with political analysis apart from ideology, incorporating English and French sources.

Neo-Whigs of the 1950s forward avoided the triumphalism of the 1930s 'Whig historians' of the Revolution. The neo-Whigs added empire perspective, explored Patriot differences among colonies and within each colony, and added treatment of Tory elements. Maier's account of evolving Patriot differences is "Ratification: The People Debate the Constitution 1787–1788". Still, neo-Whigs have critics who see no causal imperative to revolution by Lockean ideals. Maier's account of the connections is found in American Scripture: The Making of the Declaration of Independence.

Neo-Whigs versus neo-Progressives

In contrast to the neo-Whigs, neo-Progressives explain many developments as a conservative return to Coke's 'Rights of Englishmen', a reaction to economic imperatives of expanding Empire. The British of all classes everywhere in the empire were more free than any in the world. Neo-progressives show that the structural economic change in the English Atlantic empire and local profit margins counted as much for merchants and planters as a colonial concern for Parliament's enactments. Control of domestic markets motivated as much as rights and ideals. The Neo-Whigs have difficulty explaining a tipping point from mild protest to sustained violence. At times they have not accounted for the exodus by Tories and ex-slave British. 'Liberty' in 1776 meant different things to different people. Maier's take is found in "From Resistance to Revolution: Colonial Radicals and the Development of American Opposition to Britain, 1765–1776".

Neo-Whigs in general answer that doctrine of every kind was underpinned by a colonial social reality that was by its nature uncertain and unstable. Nevertheless, they are charged with favoring those who could read and write. Social historians expanded historical inquiry into urban labor movements and rural militias. Maier contributed to the wider sensibility with her article "Popular Uprisings in 18th Century America" in the William and Mary Quarterly, featured in a reissue of their 50-year best. And while neo-Whigs can explain much of later social, economic and political transformation, see Maier's "Revolutionary Origins of the American Corporation", there still remains how marginalized populations (day-laborers, women, blacks slave and free, Amerindians) should be incorporated into the narrative of the American Revolution.

Expanding 'early American' history

Indeed, whatever was once "Early American History" is changed and changing. The field is 'imperialistically' reaching chronologically forward fifty years and backwards a century. It has spread geographically over the entire continent and across Atlantic communities. It topically encompasses slavery, gender, ethnicity and borderland outliers. The new intellectual fault line is methodological, based on differences in research standards and how to relate theory and archival research.

A recent collection by Donald A. Yerxa looks towards finding a 'reconceptualization' of the field with chronological bounds based on newly researched continuity and change, along with more coherent themes. Maier's section was a forum on historiography, Peter C. Mancall led 'the colonial period', and Gordon S. Wood started 'revolution and early republic'. Maier began the historiography section with three "Disjunctions" based on her previous work at NEH and a newly written rejoinder following comments by five other scholars.

In the first disjunction considered by Maier, the social 'Colonial' history is unlike the predominantly political and ideological 'Revolution' history. Colonial history from the Amerindian experience reaches a discontinuity at a time when U.S. imperialism overtakes earlier Hispanic developments in the 1800s. Maier agreed, "a disjunction in historical research is not a disjunction in history." The challenge is to find a bridge from modern fruitful research into the previous scholarship based on national boundaries. The second disjunction is between scholarly interests and the general public. Younger scholars are dropping the history of white men's politics. While bestsellers are written on Franklin, Washington, Adams, and '1776', many modern, cultural historians shun white male elites. "Nation" is dismissed as an imagined or invented construct and 'nationalism' in their critique lacks explanatory power for inclusive historical analysis.

Maier's third disjunction, related to the second, is between historical scholarship and history taught in secondary schools and college survey courses. While social and cultural historians add to the body of the scholarly literature in their professional careers, Maier asks, "why not synthesize and perpetuate the contributions of previous (political, military and diplomatic) scholars, at least in the classroom?" (Related on this page, see references to Maier's work in two fellowships at National Endowment of Humanities, Guggenheim Foundation, Annenberg Foundation, PBS, History Channel, and textbooks referenced by scholars.)

== Works ==
=== Books ===
- From Resistance to Revolution: Colonial Radicals and the Development of American Opposition to Britain, 1765–1776. New York, Knopf, 1972. ISBN 978-0-394-46190-8
- With Jack P. Greene (eds.). Interdisciplinary Study of the American Revolution. Beverly Hills, California: Sage, 1976. ISBN 080390732X
- The Old Revolutionaries: Political Lives in the Age of Samuel Adams. New York: Knopf, 1980. ISBN 978-0-393-30663-7
- American Scripture: Making the Declaration of Independence. New York: Knopf, 1997. ISBN 978-0-679-45492-2, Vintage ISBN 978-0-679-77908-7
- With Merritt Roe Smith, Alexander Keyssar, Daniel Kevles. Inventing America: A History of the United States. 2nd ed. New York: Norton, 2003. ISBN 978-0-393-97434-8
- Ratification: The People Debate the Constitution, 1787–1788. New York, Simon & Schuster, 2010. ISBN 978-0-684-86854-7, ISBN 978-1-4516-0636-2

=== Book chapters ===
- "Introduction". In The Declaration of Independence and the Constitution of the United States. New York: Bantam, 1998.ISBN 978-0-553-21482-6
- Essay. In Thomas Jefferson: Genius of Liberty. Washington, DC: Viking Studio and Library of Congress, 2000. ISBN 978-0-670-88933-4
- "Declaration of Independence". In Stanley I. Kutler (ed.) Dictionary of American History. New York: Scribner's Sons, 2003. ISBN 978-0-684-80533-7
- "The Declaration's Influence". In Brian Lamb and Susan Swain (eds.) Abraham Lincoln: Great American Historians on Our Sixteenth President. New York: Public Affairs, 2008, p. 212. ISBN 978-1-58648-676-1
- "Who Really Wrote the Declaration of Independence?". In McCullough, David G. et al. Declaring Independence: The Origin and Influence of America's Founding Document. Charlottesville, Virginia: University of Virginia Library, 2008. ISBN 978-0-9799997-0-3
- "The Path toward Independence". In Charlene Mires, ed. The American Revolution. Fort Washington, Pennsylvania: Eastern National, National Park Service, 2009. ISBN 978-1-59091-000-9

=== Selected scholarly articles and reviews ===
- "Popular Uprisings in Eighteenth-Century America". The William and Mary Quarterly, vol. 27, no. 1 (Jan., 1970), pp. 3–35. Reprint: William and Mary Quarterly, 1, (1999): 138.
- With Jack P. Greene. "Interdisciplinary Studies of the American Revolution". Journal of Interdisciplinary History, vol. 6, no. 4 (Spring, 1976), pp. 543–544.
- "The Revolutionary Origins of the American Corporation". The William and Mary Quarterly, vol. 50, no. 1 (January 1993), pp. 51–84.
- "America Unabridged: The Young Republic: 1787 to 1860". American Heritage (December 2004) p. 32 ISSN 0002-8738
- "Lacroix: The Ideological Origins of American Federalism". The William and Mary Quarterly. vol. 67, no. 3, (2010): 557
- "The Documentary History of the Ratification of the Constitution", vols. 19–23. Review of primary source collection. The William and Mary Quarterly. vol. 68, no. 1, (2011): 155–159 OCLC 704488395

=== Texts, online courses ===
Maier wrote college textbooks and used them to teach undergraduates. She also designed online courses available at her university and used by other universities

- The American People: A History (1986).
- Maier et al. Inventing America: A History of the United States (2006).
- "America's Documents of Freedom" (2009) by Goldhil Video. Greg Heimer narrator. 11 DVDs. Panel: Pauline Maier, John Smolenski, Robert George, Wilson Smith.
- With M. Henry. US History Skillbook with Writing Practice and Exercises. 2nd ed.
- With U.S. History: A Document-Based Skillbook. 2nd ed. ISBN 978-1-4138-9328-1

=== Popular reviews and columns ===
Maier wrote popular book reviews and opinion columns for several periodicals, including the New York Times, relating to her scholarly area of expertise. She occasionally appeared as a guest on radio talk programs and was an advisor to History News Network

- "A Marriage That Worked". The New York Times, September 20, 1981. On Lynne Withey's Dearest Friend: A Life of Abigail Adams.
- "Victorian Women, Including Victoria". The New York Times, May 16, 1982. On Janet H. Murray's Strong-minded Women and Other Lost Voices from 19th Century England.
- "A World of Women". The New York Times, December 12, 1982. On Barbara Strachey's Remarkable Relations: The Story of the Pearsall Smith Women.
- "Children's Books; The Challenge of Children's History, Making It Vivid Getting It Right". The New York Times, May 17, 1987. Review of ten children's books on the Revolution and the Constitution.
- "James Madison Made Us Up". The New York Times, July 3, 1988. On Edmund S. Morgan's Inventing the People: The Rise of Popular Sovereignty in England and America.
- "The Dissertation That Would Not Die". The New York Times, July 30, 1989. On Frank Bourgin's The Great Challenge: The Myth of Laissez-faire in the Early Republic.
- "The All-Purpose Bad Guy". The New York Times, August 26, 1990. On Willard S. Randall's Benedict Arnold: Patriot and Traitor.
- "Continent of Conquest". The New York Times, July 14, 1996. On John Keegan's Fields of Battle: The Wars for North America.
- "Jefferson, Real and Imagined". The New York Times, July 4, 1997.
- "Reversal of Fortune". The New York Times, November 16, 1997. On Richard M. Ketchum's Saratoga: Turning Point of America's Revolutionary War.
- "The Do-It-Yourself Society". The New York Times, March 1, 1998. On Paul Johnson's A History of the American People.
- "Sparring for Liberty" The New York Times, November 1, 1998. On Eric Foner's The Story of American Freedom.
- "Plain Speaking". The New York Times, May 27, 2001. Review of David McCullough's John Adams.
- "Justice Breyer's Sharp Aim". The New York Times, December 21, 2010.
- "Maya Jasanoff's Liberty's Exiles: On British Loyalists after the revolution". Washington Post, February 22, 2011. Also recalls Mary Beth Norton's 1970 prize-winning British Americans.

=== Video ===
- "Why Does America Have the Constitution of 1787?: New Historical Perspectives" by Joseph F. Cullon, Pauline Maier, Jack N. Rakove, Woody Holton, Max M. Edling. Dartmouth College. Video, DVD 88 min. (May, 2009) OCLC 436157413

== Recognition ==
- 2011 - George Washington Book Prize for Ratification: The People Debate the Constitution, 1787–1788
