= Johann Melchior Molter =

German composer and violinist (1696–1765)

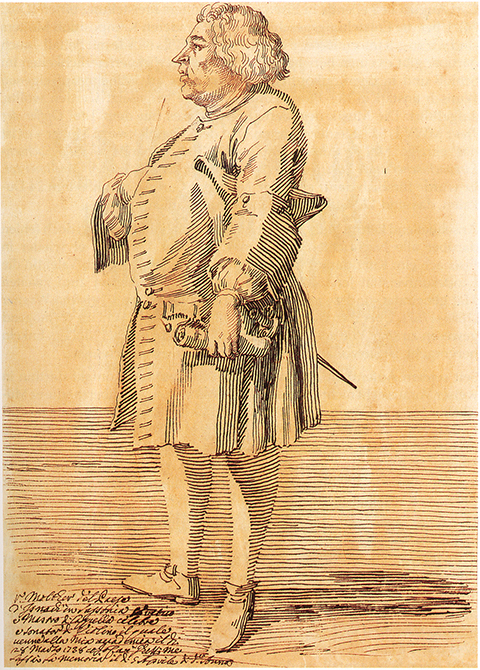
Johann Melchior Molter

Johann Melchior Molter (10 February 1696 – 12 January 1765) was a German composer and violinist of the late Baroque period.

He was born at Tiefenort, near Eisenach, and was educated at the Gymnasium in Eisenach, Saxe-Eisenach. By autumn 1717 he had left Eisenach and was working as a violinist in Karlsruhe. Here he married Maria Salome Rollwagen, with whom he had eight children. From 1719 to 1721 he studied composition in Italy. From 1722 to 1733 he was court Kapellmeister at Karlsruhe. In 1734 he became Kapellmeister at the court of Duke Wilhelm Heinrich of Saxe-Eisenach.

Maria died in 1737; by 1742 Molter had married Maria Christina Wagner. In that year he returned to Karlsruhe and began teaching at the gymnasium there. From 1747 to his death Molter was employed by Margrave Carl Friedrich of Baden-Durlach, the son of his first employer. He died at Karlsruhe.

Molter's surviving works include an oratorio; several cantatas; over 140 symphonies, overtures, and other works for orchestra; many concertos, including some of the first clarinet concertos ever written; and many pieces of chamber music.

One of Molter's many Trumpet Concertos is the signature piece of C-SPAN's Washington Journal.
