= 2016 Chester, Pennsylvania, train derailment =

2016 collision between train and backhoe

2016 Chester, Pennsylvania train derailment
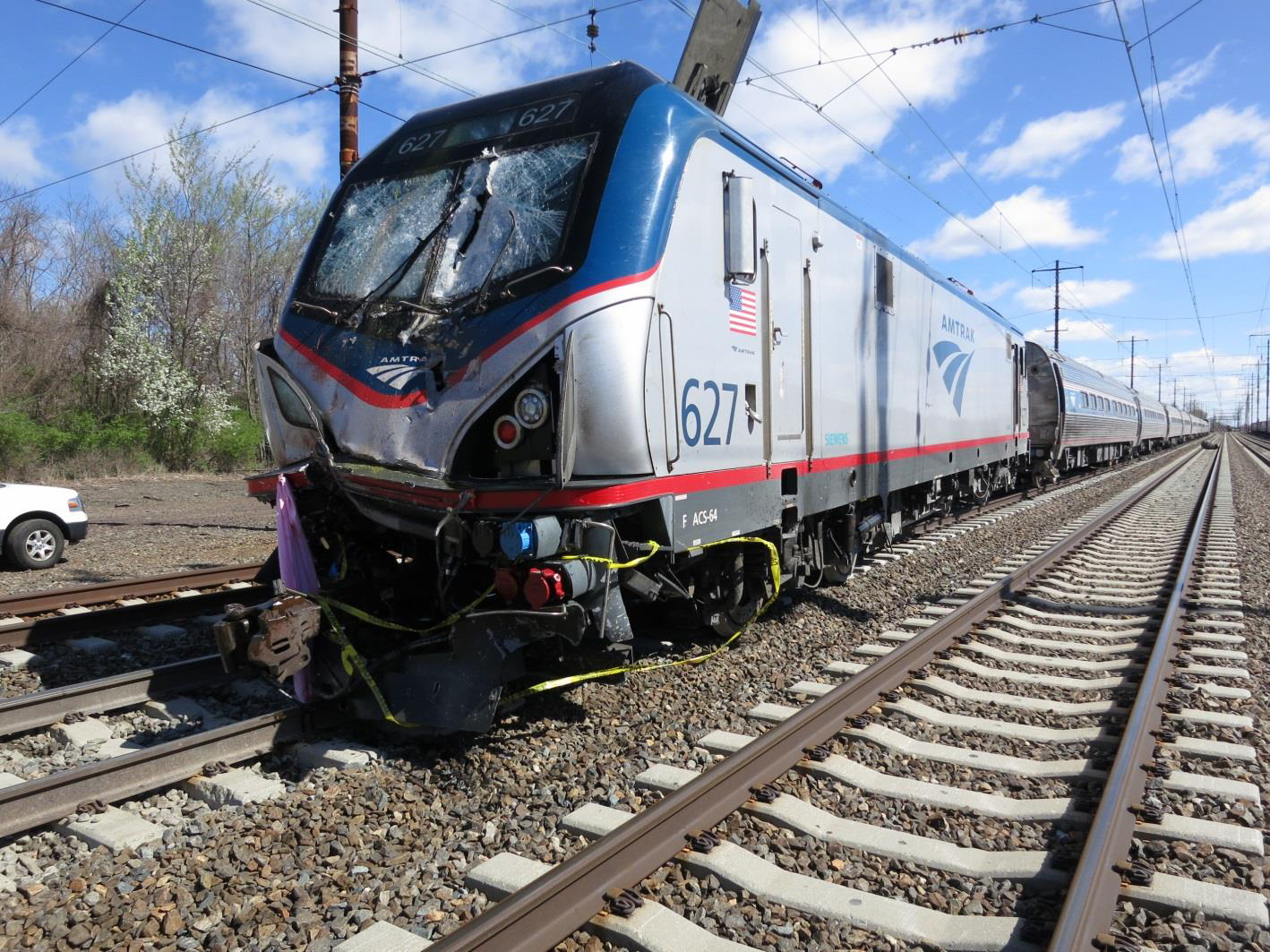
- The damaged locomotive after the collision

- Location within Pennsylvania

Details
- Date: April 3, 2016; 10 years ago 7:50 a.m. EDT (UTC−4)
- Location: Chester, Pennsylvania
- Coordinates: 39°49′59.0″N 75°23′40.1″W
- Country: United States
- Line: Northeast Corridor
- Operator: Amtrak
- Incident type: Obstruction on line and consequent derailment
- Cause: Lack of safety device and communication between crew and dispatcher

Statistics
- Trains: 1 (a single ACS-64 locomotive and several Amfleet coaches)
- Passengers: 337
- Crew: 7
- Deaths: 2 track workers
- Injured: 41
- Damage: Passenger cars damaged; total damages $2.2 million (estimate)

On April 3, 2016, Amtrak train 89, the southbound Palmetto, struck a backhoe while travelling through Chester, Pennsylvania, killing two track workers and derailing the locomotive, as well as damaging the first two cars.

== Accident ==
The train, en route to Savannah, Georgia, had departed Philadelphia's 30th Street Station at 7:32 a.m. The train was carrying seven crew members and 337 passengers, including two employee passengers. The train was composed of one locomotive, eight passenger cars, one café car, and one baggage car. It struck a backhoe obstructing the line at 7:50 a.m., slightly north of the Booth Street underpass. The NTSB determined that the train was traveling at 106 mph, below the authorized speed of 110 mph. The Siemens ACS-64 locomotive 627 sustained extensive damage to its cab and was derailed; at least two of the cars were damaged. Two maintenance workers—a backhoe operator and a track supervisor—were killed in the crash. Forty-one people were hospitalized. Passengers were evacuated from the train to a nearby church.

Among the passengers was businessman and former presidential candidate Steve Forbes, who was on his way to Washington, D.C., to participate in the C-SPAN interview program In Depth. Forbes was unable to complete his trip, but did participate in a 15-minute interview by phone about his experiences that morning.

Amtrak rail service between Wilmington and Philadelphia, was suspended, as was service on the SEPTA Wilmington/Newark Line. New Jersey Transit accepted Amtrak tickets for services between New York City and Trenton while services were disrupted. Service restored the following morning, though with residual delays.

== Investigation and aftermath ==
The National Transportation Safety Board (NTSB) and Federal Railroad Administration immediately opened investigations into the accident. One aspect of the NTSB investigation is whether or not the maintenance crew were working on the correct track. The train event recorder and locomotive video (both forward-facing and inward-facing) were recovered by the NTSB.

The NTSB released its preliminary report on April 18, 2016, and its final report on November 14, 2017. The NTSB report said that according to the federal investigation, the track was supposed to be closed to trains at the time of the crash. The backhoe and the two killed workers were authorized to be present on track 2 during the maintenance period (which was scheduled to be from 10:00 p.m. April 1 until 5:00 a.m. April 4), for ballast cleaning and remediation of fouled ballast (mud spots). The incident took place on Track 3, which was supposed to be subject to temporary closure while the backhoe was brought into position on Track 2. The report states that Amtrak estimated that the crash resulted in $2.2 million in damages.

Positive train control systems were in place and functional on the train and tracks. However, crews performing work on the stretch of track where the crash occurred failed to deploy a supplemental shunting device while completing track work. Deployment of this device is considered a basic safety measure and is required by Amtrak's rules (although not by federal regulation) whenever workers are completing track work in short windows of time ("foul time"). The NTSB released further information in January 2017, including interviews conducted as part of the investigation, that showed apparent miscommunication between two shift foremen regarding whether the track dispatcher had been informed of track restrictions.

The Brotherhood of Maintenance of Way Employees Division, the union representing track workers, was highly critical of Amtrak management in the weeks after the crash, saying that Amtrak's safety procedures were inadequate.

In October 2017, it was revealed that one of the track workers had taken oxycodone and the other had taken cocaine. The engineer had taken marijuana.

== See also ==
- List of rail accidents (2010–2019)
- List of American railroad accidents
