= Steve Scully =

American broadcast journalist

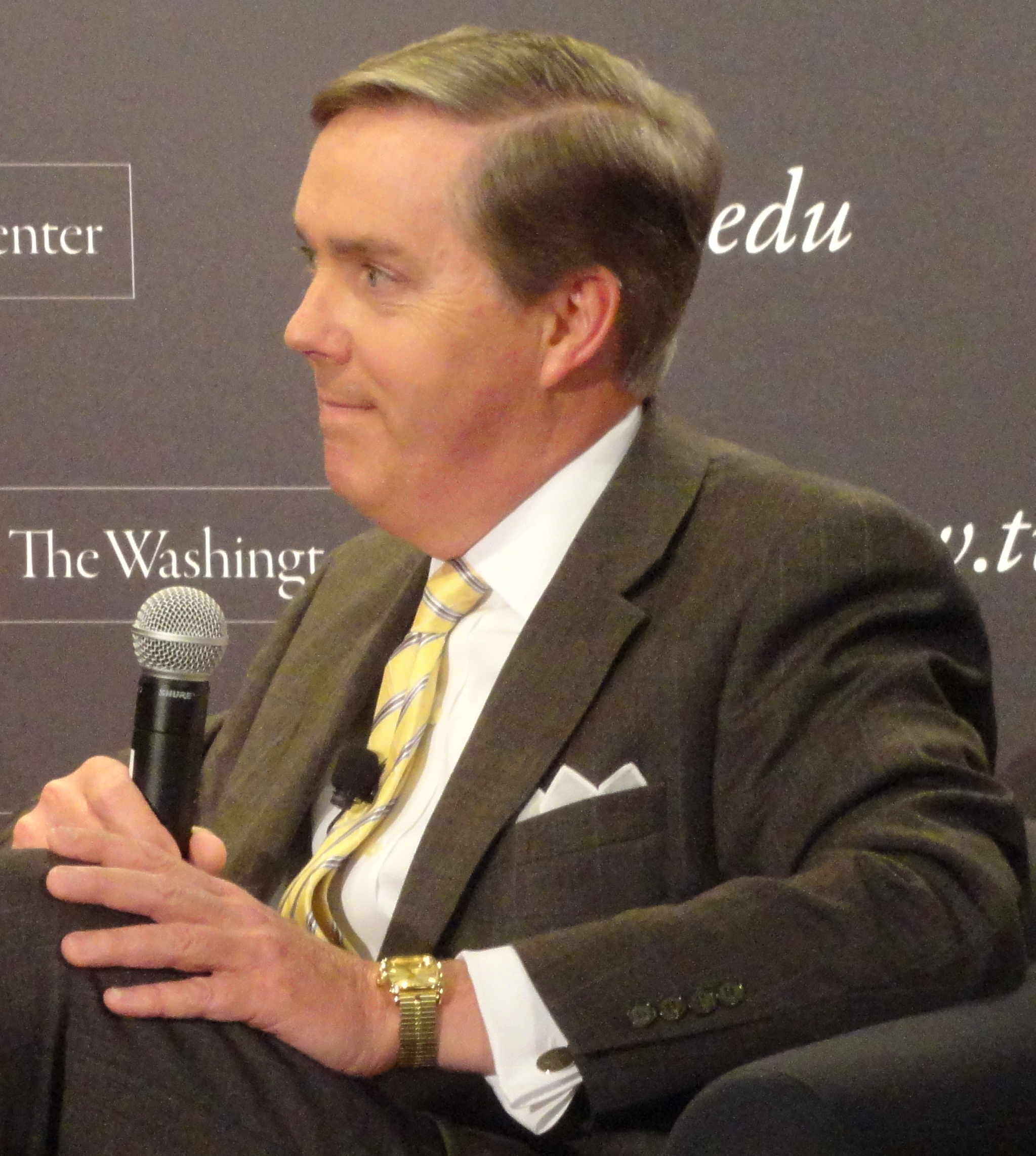
- Scully in 2012
- Born: September 17, 1960 (age 66); Erie, Pennsylvania, U.S.
- Education: American University (BA); Northwestern University (MS)
- Occupation: Broadcast journalist
- Employers: C-SPAN (1990–2021); SiriusXM (2022–present)
- Television: Washington Journal
- Spouse: Katie Scully
- Children: 4

Steven L. Scully (born September 17, 1960) is an Emmy Award winning American broadcast journalist. He is the host of "The Briefing with Steve Scully" on SiriusXM POTUS 124, contributor to TheHill.com, and senior vice president, communications at the Bipartisan Policy Center. In July 2024, he was named a Senior Fellow at the University of Southern California (USC) Annenberg School for Communication and Journalism - Center on Communications Leadership and Policy. In January 2025 he also joined the Former Members of Congress as a Senior Fellow, working to bridge the political divide in Washington within Congress. He is the former C-SPAN Political Editor, as well as former host and producer for its morning call-in show Washington Journal, "Washington Today" on C-SPAN Radio and The Weekly, C-SPAN's podcast. Scully served on the board of the White House Correspondents Association for nine years, including as president from 2006 to 2007.

== Early life and education ==
Scully was born in Erie, Pennsylvania to Hubert L. "Hoot" Scully and Elizabeth Jane North "Betty" Scully. He was the 14th of 16 children, including five sets of twins.

Scully received a 1982 undergraduate degree with honors in communication and political science from American University in Washington, D.C. during which he completed a 1980–81 study abroad program at the University of Copenhagen. He served as an intern for Sen. Joe Biden from September to October 1978 and in Sen. Ted Kennedy's media affairs office in early 1979 earning college credits. Scully then earned a Master of Science degree in journalism from Northwestern University’s Medill School of Journalism graduating magna cum laude in 1984.

== Career ==
Scully began his journalism career in 1981-82 as a weekend newscaster on WAMU, the American University–based radio station. Following his undergraduate degree, he worked as a reporter and anchor for Erie's WSEE-TV in 1982 and 1983. He returned to WSEE after completing his graduate studies in 1984. After a stint as a Washington, D.C.–based correspondent for WHBF-TV in Rock Island, Illinois, he joined WHEC-TV in Rochester, New York, in 1986 as a correspondent covering business, politics and local government. He also taught courses on media and politics as an adjunct faculty member at Nazareth College and St. John Fisher College.

=== C-SPAN ===
Scully joined C-SPAN in 1990 as political editor and White House producer. Over his tenure at the network, he was responsible for coordinating campaign programming for C-SPAN, C-SPAN.org and C-SPAN Radio. As senior producer for the network's White House coverage, Scully managed a team of field producers responsible for coverage of the White House, politics and special projects. He served as a regular Sunday host of Washington Journal, a live three-hour news and public affairs program. He was a host and moderator for a number of other C-SPAN programs, including Newsmakers, Road to the White House and In Depth on Book TV. In addition to his television work, he regularly appeared on C-SPAN Radio's Washington Today, a live two-hour afternoon drive time program broadcast nationwide on Sirius XM Radio.

Scully was a backup moderator for all four of the 2016 presidential and vice presidential debates. He was supposed to moderate the second 2020 presidential debate, but it was cancelled when Donald Trump, the Republican nominee, refused to agree to a virtual debate after his COVID-19 diagnosis.

On October 15, 2020, the date that the second 2020 presidential debate was supposed to be held, C-SPAN placed Scully on temporary paid leave after he admitted to misleading about his Twitter feed being hacked when confronted about an exchange he had with Anthony Scaramucci. According to Politico, it was not the first time Scully "used the [hacking] excuse to disavow posts in his name, having done so at least twice in the past". The Daily Beast reported that, in 2012 and 2013, Scully "apologized for tweets about weight loss, among other things, saying, 'Darn those hackers.'" In reference to the Scaramucci tweet, Scully apologised to his colleagues stating "I ask for their forgiveness."

Scully returned as a political editor, senior executive producer and producer for the call-in show Washington Journal, and on-air host of The Weekly, on January 5, 2021. He returned to host Washington Journal on April 5, 2021.

In July 2021, as part of a company-wide buy-out offer due to cable cord cutting, Scully departed from C-SPAN to take a position as vice president of communications at the Bipartisan Policy Center.

=== University lecturer ===
In January 2003, Scully assumed the Amos P. Hostetter Chair at the University of Denver and Cable Center, teaching a distance learning course on media, politics and public policy issues via a cable television connection between Washington, D.C., University of Denver, Pace University, and George Mason University. The class aired on C-SPAN and C-SPAN3, and was streamed via the C-SPAN website. He taught the course at the University of Denver until 2011. He has also taught at George Mason University in conjunction with Purdue University and The Washington Center. He has been a faculty member at the University of California DC Program and George Washington University.

=== White House Correspondents' Association ===
Scully served nine years on the Executive Board of the White House Correspondents' Association, and was elected by his peers to serve as president from 2006 to 2007. Until her death, Scully's mother accompanied him to most WHCA dinners throughout the administrations of Presidents Bill Clinton, George W. Bush, and Barack Obama.

=== SiriusXM ===
In July 2021, he began guest-hosting Sirius XM POTUS 124 programs and in December 2021 began co-hosting the mid-day show following the departure of Chris Cuomo. On June 6, 2022, Scully launched a new show, The Briefing with Steve Scully, on SiriusXM satellite radio, airing weekday afternoons.

== Recognition ==
In September 2026, he received the Hagen History Museum (Erie, PA) Distinguished Resident Honor, as part of a ceremony that included 12 additional NW Pennsylvania natives. In May 2025, Scully received a Doctor of Humane Letters (Honorary) from Gannon University during its centennial commencement ceremonies. According to Politico, Scully is known in the media for his "evenhandedness". He was the 2009 recipient of the Fitzwater Center for Communications Award, for exemplary journalism and public service, and in the same year was recognized by The Washingtonian as one of the capital's "50 Top Journalists". John Oliver has repeatedly referred to Scully as "The Most Patient Man on Television" in recurring segments of Last Week Tonight with John Oliver, mainly for hosting calls from audibly erratic/conspiracy theory-believing callers. In 2018 he served as a Stanford University Fellow at the Hoover Institution, focusing on media studies and American politics. Scully was inducted into the Pennsylvania Association of Broadcasters Hall of Fame in 2019.

== Personal life ==
Scully and his wife, Kathryn R. "Katie" Scully, reside in Fairfax Station, Virginia. They have four children, one of which they adopted in 2008. Two others died in childhood, Carolyn in 1994 of sudden infant death syndrome (SIDS) and Jack in 1996. Scully serves on the board of both the CJ Foundation for SIDS which raises money for sudden infant death syndrome research, St. Jude's Children Hospital and First Candle which aims to increases public awareness of SIDS.
