= List of BNSF Railway accidents and incidents =

BNSF Railway is one of the largest railroad companies in North America. A number of accidents and incidents have occurred on the railway since its inception in 1996.

== Major incidents ==
=== 2002 ===
- April 23 of 2002, – A BNSF Railway freight train collides head-on with a Metrolink train in Placentia, California, near the Atwood Junction, at the intersection of Orangethorpe Avenue and Van Buren Street. 2 people died in the crash and 22 were seriously injured.

=== 2004 ===
- May 19 of 2004 – Gunter Train Collision – Two BNSF freight trains collide head-on near Gunter, Texas. The train engineer of the southbound train died.
- June 28, 2004 – A westbound Union Pacific Railroad freight train collides with the middle of an eastbound BNSF freight that was entering a siding at Macdona, Texas. Several cars on both trains and the four UP locomotives were derailed; one of the derailed tank cars was punctured, releasing liquefied chlorine which vaporized into a cloud. Three people died from chlorine inhalation.

=== 2005 ===
- March 11, 2005 – A rail grinder working westbound on the Union Pacific Railroad mainline sideswipes an eastbound BNSF Railway intermodal train at Rochelle, Illinois; the trains do not derail but a few containers are destroyed. The entire event is recorded on the Trains Magazine Rochelle webcam.

=== 2006 ===
- June 14, 2006 – Kismet train collision - Two BNSF Railway freight trains collide head-on in Madera, California, due to one of the trains running a red signal, injuring 5 people. One of the train's crew members, the one that ran the red, is suspected to be high on cocaine. There was a camera on board Dash 9-44CW #4479, which was one of the locomotives involved in the collision; the video of the collision is widely available on YouTube and related sites. During the footage, the southbound train's engineer was seen jumping clear of the lead unit, BNSF Dash 9-44CW #4059 immediately before the collision.All but one of the locomotives involved in the accident were repaired, the only one deemed irreparable was NREX EMD SD50 #5473 (ex Conrail #6829).
- October 9, 2006 – The Cactus Train Collision - A BNSF coal train (led by BNSF units ES44-AC #5942 and SD70MAC 9939) entered an open switch on a spur track which had failed to be realigned, and collided with a set of empty freight cars. Both crewmen received minor injuries. Like the Kismet collision, it too was captured on video.
- Coordinates: 37°01'40.84"N 120°04'48.17"W

=== 2007 ===
- August 30, 2007 – A switch helper riding a covered hopper on a train that he was remotely controlling during a switching move in Mormon Yard in Stockton, California, dies when the covered hopper strikes a tank car that was blocking a crossing of two tracks.
- October 29, 2007 – Two BNSF Railway trains derail in Clara City, Minnesota, causing a hydrochloric acid spill that prompts the evacuation of about 350 people.

=== 2008 ===
- March 17, 2008 – BNSF Railway Dash 9-44CW 981 strikes a truck, causing 3 locomotives to derail 5 miles north of Marysville, Washington.
- November 20, 2008 – An eastbound Metrolink train scrapes the side at the rear of a BNSF freight train that is entering a siding near Rialto, California. Neither train derails, and only minor injuries to the crew and passengers of the Metrolink train are reported.
- November 22, 2008 – A BNSF freight train derails east of Clarendon, Texas, along U.S. Highway 287.
- December 21, 2008 – A BNSF train collides with a vehicle at a level crossing in Colona, Illinois.

=== 2009 ===
- December 29, 2009 – A BNSF yard crewman was crushed between a boxcar and an adjacent building at Northtown Yard in Minneapolis, Minnesota, when the boxcar he was riding during a switching manoeuver derailed.

=== 2011 ===
- March 23, 2011 – A Chevrolet Suburban operated by Coach America under contract to provide crew transportation for BNSF is struck by a freight train at a private level crossing within the Longview Junction yard at Kelso, Washington. Three of the four people in the Suburban died.
- April 17, 2011 – BNSF EMD SD70ACe 9159 and GE ES44AC 6133 collides with standing maintenance of way equipment near Red Oak, Iowa, derailing two locomotives and 12 cars; both crewmembers aboard the coal train died. 9159 and 6133 were repaired, 9159 now known as 8749, due to a request by the family of one of the victims.
- August 15, 2011 – A BNSF crewman dies during a coupling operation in Argentine Yard in Kansas City, Kansas.

=== 2012 ===
- January 9, 2012 – A Loram railgrinder operating in a yard near Amarillo, Texas, strikes a BNSF welding foreman, who dies. The Loram crew interpreted a hand signal that the foreman gave as indicating a reverse move; the foreman stepped onto the track, crouched and turned his back to the train to open a derail as the railgrinder began moving toward him.
- January 17, 2012 – A BNSF freight train collides with a tractor trailer in northeast Montana, causing ten rail cars to derail, including four locomotives and blocking the traffic on the rail line.
- July 21, 2012 – A Kansas City Southern freight train collides with a BNSF coal train and derails in Barton County, Missouri, injuring two railway workers.
- December 17, 2012 – A BNSF intermodal train from Chicago derails when a landslide strikes it in Everett, Washington. This event is captured on video.

=== 2013 ===
- May 25, 2013 – BNSF and Union Pacific Railroad freight trains collide at Rockview interlocking near Chaffee, Missouri. The BNSF train was proceeding through the crossing when the UP train struck the 12th car behind the BNSF locomotives, derailing 13 cars of the BNSF train and two locomotives and 11 cars of the UP train. Some of the derailed cars struck the supports for Missouri State Highway N which crossed via a bridge above the interlocking, causing a partial collapse of the bridge.
- September 25, 2013 – A BNSF freight train collides with the rear of another standing BNSF train in Amarillo, Texas, derailing about 30 cars of the standing train. A third train traveling on the parallel main track collides with the wreckage. Four BNSF crewmen were injured and treated at local hospitals; no fatalities were reported.
- December 30, 2013 – A southbound Union Pacific Railroad freight train collides with a BNSF train near Keithville, Louisiana, derailing three locomotives and one car on the UP train and two locomotives and 11 cars on the BNSF train.
- December 30, 2013 – A westbound BNSF grain train derails near Casselton, North Dakota. The 45th car in the train derails such that it blocks the parallel second main track, into which an eastbound BNSF oil train collides. Dash 9-44CW 4934 strikes the car and almost 500,000 gallons of crude oil are released from the oil train; the oil catches fire, forcing the evacuation of 1,400 nearby residents.

=== 2014 ===
- January 13, 2014 – A BNSF train derails near Kent, Washington, after a landslide. The landslide also disrupted Amtrak and Sound Transit passenger rail service.
- January 17, 2014 – A BNSF train hauling fruits, vegetables and empty intermodal cars derails near Williston, North Dakota. The derailment also disrupted Amtrak passenger rail service between Minot, North Dakota, and Havre, Montana. No injuries were reported.
- January 22, 2014 – A BNSF train transporting 18 empty intermodal rail cars derails inside the Lindenwood Yard in St. Louis, Missouri. No injuries were reported and the derailment was cleared the same day.
- January 23, 2014 – A BNSF train carrying corn derails near Ross, North Dakota. The derailment of eleven cars disrupted transportation of crude oil from the Bakken oil formation to ports in Montana. No injuries were reported.
- July 4, 2014 – A train carrying aircraft fuselages from Spirit Aerospace to Boeing, derailed. Some of the fuselages tumbled into the Clark Fork River.

=== 2015 ===
- March 5, 2015 – A BNSF oil train derails in a rural area near Galena, Illinois. Twenty-one of the 105 cars, containing Bakken formation crude oil, leave the track and catch fire, which continues to burn for days. No injuries are reported.
- April 28, 2015 – A Southwestern Railroad Freight Train locks a switch and causes a BNSF manifest to slam into it in Roswell, New Mexico. The engineer of the BNSF train dies after jumping.

=== 2016 ===
- June 28, 2016 – Two BNSF intermodal trains collide head on in Panhandle, TX. These trains caught fire after the Chicago bound train failed to stop on a red signal, ran through a switch at 65 mph and struck the Los Angeles bound train that was preparing to enter the siding. 21 cars and 8 locomotives derailed and piled up on each other. Three people died in the collision and one was seriously injured. $16 million in property damage occurred.

=== 2023 ===
- March 30, 2023 – A BNSF train carrying ethanol and corn syrup derailed in Raymond, Minnesota, near Minneapolis. The train caught fire but no injuries were reported.
- Sunday, October 15 – southbound coal freight train derailed, partially destroyed the rail bridge over Interstate 25 north of Pueblo, Colorado. Driver of semi truck passing under bridge died. I-25 closed for days as crews clean spilled coal, remove wreckage. Train had 5 locomotives and 104 coal cars, 30 of which derailed. To be determined: if the trail derailed a) before or b) on the bridge, or c) if the structure collapsed, causing the derailment; the state-owned bridge was built in 1958 - before the interstate. Colorado Senate Democrats promptly promised new rail safety legislation in the next session.

=== 2024 ===
- April 21, 2024 – A BNSF train collided with an empty coal car, derailing two locomotives and five freight cars, in Bennet, Nebraska. At first framed as an accident, it was later found that a 17-year-old railfan intentionally "flipped a switch the wrong way” to cause the derailment, his motive being YouTube fame. The derailment caused $350,000 in damages. The teenager was charged with two felony counts of criminal mischief on July 24 in a juvenile court, with a motion in place to move to an adult court.
- August 23, 2024 – A BNSF intermodal train from Portland, OR to Los Angeles, CA collided with another BNSF train on the bridge in Boulder, CO. BNSF C44-9W 758 and ES44C4 4272 derailed, including a few intermodal cars with containers. Two crews were injured and most of the fuel spilled.
- November 4, 2024 – A BNSF grain train collides with a BNSF maintenance of way vehicle in New Rockford, ND. The driver was killed and the passenger was injured.
- December 24, 2024 – a BNSF coal train derailed near Brenham, TX, with seventeen cars coming off the track, all carrying coal. No injuries were reported.

== Minor incidents ==
- March 2, 2005 – Citing disputes in paid leave policies, around 200 BNSF Railway dispatchers walk off the job for nearly three hours, causing traffic delays over the entire system from Chicago to the Pacific coast.
- August 31, 2005 – After Hurricane Katrina, BNSF Railway announces that it expects to restore limited freight service to southern Louisiana by the end of the day on September 1. Other than debris on the mainline, the biggest problem facing crews working to reopen the line is the damage to the Bayou Boeuf bridge in Morgan City; the bridge and bridge piers were struck by a barge propelled by the storm's winds and wave action. BNSF sent crews to repair damaged railway signal systems starting on August 30. Until the southern connections were rebuilt and restored to service, BNSF rerouted freight through other hubs such as St. Louis, Missouri, Chicago, Illinois, and Memphis, Tennessee.
- February 4, 2006 – BNSF Railway temporarily shuts down passenger train operations between Seattle, Washington, and Vancouver, British Columbia, due to dangerous conditions caused by high winds in the area. The winds blew debris and knocked down power lines, cutting electricity to about 160,000 homes and businesses. BNSF's shutdown began shortly before 1:25 PM Pacific Standard Time and was scheduled to end after 48 hours, affecting Amtrak and Sound Transit trains during the period; freight traffic in the area was not suspended.
