= Charles S. Maier =

American historian

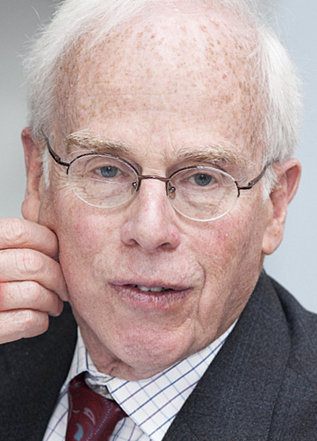
- Born: February 23, 1939 (age 87); New York City, New York, U.S.
- Education: Harvard University
- Partner: Pauline Maier
- Children: 3
- Scientific career
- Workplaces: Harvard University
- Thesis: The Strategies of Bourgeois Defense, 1918–1924: A Study of Conservative Politics and Economics in France, Germany, and Italy (1967)
- Doctoral advisor: Franklin Ford, H. Stuart Hughes
- Doctoral students: John Connelly

Charles S. Maier (born February 23, 1939) is the Leverett Saltonstall Professor Emeritus of History at Harvard University. He taught European and international history at Harvard.

== Early life and education ==
Maier was born into a non-affiliated Jewish family New York City. At the age of nine his family moved to Scarsdale, New York, where he went to a public high school.

Maier received a degree in history from Harvard University in 1960. He went to England for a year on a Henry Fellowship at St Antony's College, Oxford. In 1961, he married Pauline Rubbelke (Radcliffe '60) at Oxford and the couple toured through Europe including the Soviet Union. He completed his PhD thesis on The Strategies of Bourgeois Defense, 1918–1924: A Study of Conservative Politics and Economics in France, Germany, and Italy, supervised by Franklin Ford and then by H. Stuart Hughes, at Harvard in 1967.

== Career ==
From 1967 to 1975, Maier taught at Harvard. He held a visiting professorship of history at Bielefeld University in West Germany in from 1975 to 1976. He was an associate professor and professor of history at Duke University from 1976 to 1981. He returned to Harvard in 1981 and was appointed as the Krupp Foundation Professor of History in 1991. He then took up the Leverett Saltonstall Professorship of History in 2002, holding it until his retirement in 2019.

Maier served as the director of the Center for European Studies at Harvard 1994–2001, and co-directed the Weatherhead Research Cluster in Global History with Sven Beckert. His visiting appointments included a directorship of research at the Paris School for Advanced Studies in the Social Sciences (2007), and visiting professorships at the Luiss University in Rome (2014) and the Sapienza University of Rome (2019).

== Personal life ==
Maier was married from 1961 to the late Pauline Maier (née Rubbelke), a professor at MIT and popular American historian until her death from lung cancer in 2013. In 2017 he married Marjorie Anne Sa'adah, professor emerita of government at Dartmouth College. He has three children and eight grandchildren.

== Awards and honors ==
He is a member of the Council on Foreign Relations and the American Academy of Arts and Sciences, and is a recipient of a John Simon Guggenheim Memorial Fellowship, an Alexander von Humboldt research prize fellowship, the Cross of Honor of the German Federal Republic, and the Cross of Honor for Science and Art, first class, of the Republic of Austria. The University of Padua awarded him a laurea honoris causa in European Studies in January 2018. Prizes include the Premio Nazionale Cherasco Storia alla Carrera (2019); the American Historical Association's Award for Scholarly Distinction (2018); the Helmut Schmitt Prize for German-American American Economic History conferred by the German Historical Institute, Washington, and the Zeit and Bucerius Foundations in 2011; the American Historical Association's George Louis Beer Prize in 1978 and its Herbert Baxter Adams Prize in 1977, both for Recasting Bourgeois Europe: Stabilization in France, Germany, and Italy in the Decade after World War I

== Partial bibliography ==
=== Books (excluding edited volumes) ===
- Recasting Bourgeois Europe: Stabilization in France, Germany, and Italy in the Decade after World War I. Princeton, NJ: Princeton University Press. 1975. Reprinted with new prefaces, 1988 and 2015.
- In Search of Stability: Explorations in Historical Political Economy (New York: Cambridge University Press, 1987)
- The Unmasterable Past: History, Holocaust, and German National Identity (Cambridge, MA: Harvard University Press, 1988)
- Dissolution: The Crisis of Communism and the End of East Germany (Princeton: Princeton University Press, 1997)
- Among Empires: American Ascendancy and its Predecessors (Cambridge, MA: Harvard University Press, 2006)
- Leviathan 2.0: Inventing Modern Statehood (Cambridge, MA: Harvard University Press, 2014; also in Worlds Connected, Emily Rosenberg, ed. Harvard University Press, 2012)
- Once within Borders: Territories of Power, Wealth, and Belonging since 1500 (Cambridge, MA: Harvard University Press, 2016)
- The Project-State and Its Rivals: A New History of the Twentieth and Twenty-First Centuries (Cambridge, MA: Harvard University Press, 2023)

=== Articles ===
- "Between Taylorism and technocracy: European ideologies and the vision of industrial productivity in the 1920s". Journal of contemporary history 5#2 (1970): 27-61. JSTOR 259743.
- "The politics of productivity: foundations of American international economic policy after World War II". International Organization 31#4 (1977): 607-633. JSTOR 2706316.
- "Marking time: the historiography of international relations". in The Past Before Us: Contemporary Historical Writing in the United States (1980): 355-87.
- Maier, Charles S. (1981). "The two postwar eras and the conditions for stability in twentieth-century Western Europe" (PDF). American Historical Review: 327–352. Archived from the original (PDF) on October 6, 2022 – via DASH - Harvard University.
- Maier, Charles S. (June 2000). "Consigning the Twentieth Century to History: Alternative Narratives for the Modern Era" (PDF). American Historical Review. 105 (3): 807–831. doi:10.2307/2651811.
- “The Cold War and the World Economy", in The Cambridge History of the Cold War, Melvyn P. Leffler and Odd Arne Westad, eds. (3 vols., Cambridge: Cambridge University Press, 2010 ), I, 44-66.
- "History lived and history written : Germany and the United States, 1945/55-2015" (PDF). Bulletin of the German Historical Institute. 57 (Fall): 7–23. 2015. Archived from the original (PDF) on June 2, 2016.
- “In Merkel’s Crisis, Echoes of Weimar", NYR Daily: New York Review of Books, 12/4/2017.
- "H-Diplo Memories" (H-Diplo "Essay Series on Learning the Scholar’s Craft: Reflections of Historians and International Relations Scholars" 16 October 2020) online autobiography
