= Glenrock train wreck =

1923 railway incident in Wyoming, United States

Coordinates: 42°52′26″N 106°02′00″W

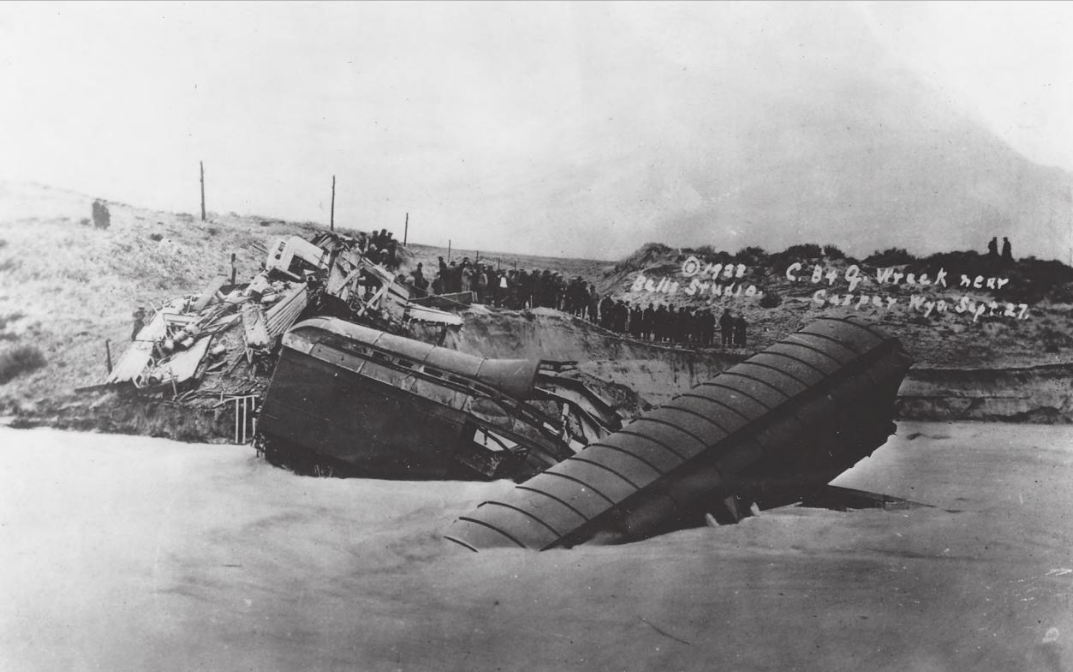

Details
- Date: September 27, 1923; 102 years ago 9:05 p.m.
- Location: Converse County, near Glenrock, Wyoming
- Country: United States
- Line: Chicago, Burlington and Quincy Railroad
- Operator: Colorado and Southern Railway
- Incident type: Bridge collapse
- Cause: Cloudburst

Statistics
- Trains: 1
- Passengers: 66
- Deaths: 30
- Injured: 2

The Glenrock train wreck is the worst train wreck in Wyoming history, killing 30. It happened on the Chicago, Burlington and Quincy Railroad between Glenrock and Casper on September 27, 1923. (The nearest current community is Meadow Acres, lying west of the site, across the North Platte River). It occurred when the Casper to Denver train, only 15 miles into its journey, plunged into Cole Creek after the bridge spanning it had washed away after three days of storms.

The storms of September 27–29 caused flooding over much of central Wyoming and wrecked other railroad bridges, though none with such catastrophic results. Newspaper reporters from Denver who attempted to reach the site by road were still stranded 100 miles away on September 29.

== Wreck ==
The train concerned was operated jointly by the Burlington and the Colorado and Southern Railway and comprised seven cars hauled by Colorado and Southern engine No. 350 (an F-3-A class 4-6-2 built by Baldwin in 1911 (serial number 35771). It had left Casper at 8:35 p.m., due in Denver at 10 a.m. the following day. According to the official ICC report, it was traveling at a speed between 30 and 40 miles per hour (48 and 64 km/h) when it reached bridge 98 crossing Cole Creek. Being on a curve, the bridge was not visible to the headlights of the train until it was too late. The only surviving member of the train or engine crew stated that the emergency brakes were only applied just before the train plunged off the rails.

After the accident, very little of the bridge structure remained. The engine ended up "practically submerged in sand" and the structure of the first car was completely destroyed. The next three cars ended up in the creek, the second and fourth on top of the third, which was '"demolished". The fifth car remained on the west bank with one end submerged, although it finally fell into the torrent.

== Rescue ==
A rescue train from Casper arrived at the scene at 11 p.m. and found over 20 people stranded on top of a sleeping car "begging to be rescued". The Dallas Morning News reported "A cable rope obtained from the Big Muddy oil field was thrown over to the marooned sleepers. With the headlight of the relief train playing on the scene, the slow process of rescue in this manner proceeded. Men, women and children went hand-over-hand from the sleeper to the east bank, a distance of more than 150 feet (46 m). Several times women lost one hand-hold of the rope, only to regain their balance and save themselves from dropping into the sweeping waters. After their perilous trip across the water, several women fell into a dead faint and had to be carried to waiting cars. A man carried a baby in his arms from the marooned car to the bank and almost miraculously effected a rescue".

Due to heavy rains in the area, the line had been inspected by the section foreman. At 8 p.m., the creek was only about 18 inches (460 mm) deep and he said there was no drift or debris lodged against the bridge and he was satisfied that "no dangerous condition existed". The bridge itself was constructed in 1914, it was 111 feet (34 m) in length, 20 feet (6.1 m) above the creek bed, and made up of nine wooden trestle spans; all in good condition. The roadmaster reported that in the previous nine years the depth had never exceeded 3 feet (0.91 m); yet when he arrived at the scene shortly after the accident it was running at a depth of 10 to 12 feet (3.0 to 3.7 m). It was several days before the current subsided enough to recover the bodies of all of the victims from the submerged coaches. In all, 30 of the 66 people aboard the train were killed in the accident.
