= Greta Brawner =

- Education: University of Minnesota (BA)
- Occupations: Television jornalist, anchor, editor
- Employer: C-SPAN
- Spouse: William Tyler Brawner Jr.

Greta Brawner (née Wodele) is an American broadcast journalist, television host, and producer. She is a regular host and executive producer for politics and public affairs content at C-SPAN where she anchors the network's flagship live call-in program the Washington Journal.

== Early life and education ==
Brawner graduated with a B.A. in political science from the University of Minnesota in 2000.

== Career ==
Brawner began her career in journalisma as a correspondent for Congressional Quarterly / Roll Call and later for CongressDaily (later National Journal Daily) where she frequently appeared on C-SPAN.

In March 2007, she officially joined C-SPAN as a host and senior producer of the network's live call in-in program Washington Journal. In 2016, she was named the managing producer of the public affairs coverage team and as a member of the network's editorial board.

In 2022, she received a Touchstones of Leadership Award from Washington DC/Baltimore chapter of The WICT Network recognizing her contributions to the cable and telecommunications industry through leadership, vision, and dedication.

Brawner has appeared as a speaker including at the White House Historical Association’s Presidential Sites Summit.

== Personal life ==
In 2008, she married William Tyler Brawner Jr.
