= Franklin Ford =

American historian

- Born: December 26, 1920; Waukegan, Illinois
- Died: August 31, 2003 (aged 82); Lexington, Massachusetts
- Citizenship: American
- Education: University of Minnesota (AB); Harvard University (MA, PhD)
- Children: 2
- Scientific career
- Workplaces: Harvard University
- Thesis: The high noblesse de robe and the regrouping of the French aristocracy, 1715–1748 (1950)
- Doctoral advisor: Crane Brinton
- Other academic advisors: Georges Lefebvre
- Doctoral students: Charles S. Maier

Franklin Lewis Ford (26 December 1920, Waukegan, Illinois – 31 August 2003, Lexington, Massachusetts) was an American history professor and dean.

== Education and career ==
Franklin Ford received in 1942 his A.B. from the University of Minnesota. From 1943 to 1946 he served in the U.S. Army Signal Corps and the Office of Strategic Services. At Harvard University he graduated with M.A. in 1948 and Ph.D. in 1950. He specialized in modern German history and 17th-century French history. From 1949 to 1952 he taught at Bennington College. In Harvard University's history department, he was an assistant professor from 1953 to 1956, an associate professor 1956 to 1959, and a full professor from 1959 to 1991, when he retired as professor emeritus. In 1968 he was named the McLean Professor of Ancient and Modern History. At Harvard he was Faculty of Arts and Sciences dean from 1962 to 1970 (as successor to McGeorge Bundy) and acting dean during spring 1973.

On April 9, 1969, 300 students protesting several university policies, some related to the war in Vietnam, gained control of Harvard's principal administration building. They threw out Dr. Ford and eight other deans and closed off the building's doors with bicycle chains. ... Some hours after Dr. Ford was ousted from the building, he returned to the scene. He used a bullhorn to warn the students in the building that they would be subject to criminal trespass charges if they did not clear the building within 15 minutes. ... At the time, Dr. Ford declared that if the Harvard community did not "recognize that what is at stake is the freedom to teach, to inquire and to learn," then "there will be little point in pretending much longer that this is a real university." "The buildings will remain, but the soul will be gone," he said.

Ford was a Guggenheim Fellow for the academic year 1952–1953. In 1961 he was elected a Fellow of the American Academy of Arts and Sciences. He was elected to the American Philosophical Society in 1974. He was at the Institute for Advanced Study for the first six months of 1974.

Ford was the author of four books and was working on a book on the history of the Huguenots when he died. Upon his death he was survived by his widow, two sons, and a granddaughter.

== Selected publications ==
- Robe and Sword: The Regrouping of the French Aristocracy after Louis XIV. Harvard University Press. 1953. OCLC 797156555.
- Strasbourg in Transition, 1648–1789. Harvard University Press. 1958. OCLC 500138036.
- Europe, 1780–1830. London: Longman. 1970. ISBN 0-582-03378-0. 2nd edition. 1989. ISBN 9780582033788.
- Political Murder: From Tyrannicide to Terrorism. Harvard University Press. 1985. ISBN 9780674686366.
  - German translation: Der politische Mord. Von der Antike bis zur Gegenwart. Hamburg. 1990. ISBN 3-88506-179-1.
  - French translation: Le meurtre politique: du tyrannicide au terrorisme. Presses Universitaires de France. 1990. ISBN 978-2-13-042820-6.
