= South Bend train wreck =

1859 railroad accident in Indiana

Coordinates: 41°39′25″N 86°12′58″W

South Bend Train Wreck
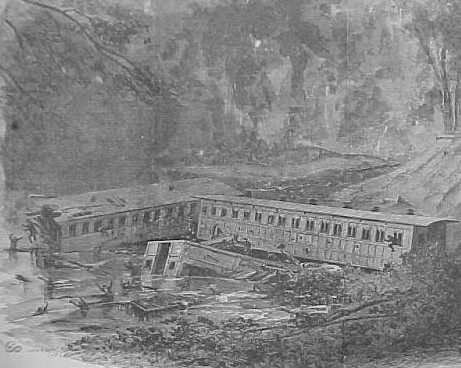
- Wood engraved view of wreck from Frank Leslie's Illustrated Newspaper, New York, dated July 16, 1859

Details
- Date: June 27, 1859; 167 years ago Just before midnight
- Location: between Mishawaka and South Bend, Indiana
- Country: United States
- Operator: Michigan Southern Railroad
- Incident type: Embankment washed away
- Cause: Blocked culvert

Statistics
- Trains: 1
- Passengers: 150
- Deaths: 42
- Injured: 50

The South Bend Train Wreck (known also as the Great Mishawaka Train Wreck) occurred on June 27, 1859, between Mishawaka and South Bend in Indiana on the Michigan Southern Railroad killing 42 people and injuring 50 more.

The train concerned was the Night Express from Chicago to Toledo carrying about 150 passengers. Just before midnight it was crossing an embankment known as the Springbrook Bridge over a 25-foot (7.6 m) deep ravine at a speed of 10 to 20 mph (16 to 32 km/h) when the embankment collapsed, plunging the entire train into a torrent of water, drowning many.

According to the Chicago Daily Journal: "The engine was literally buried in the opposite side of the ravine in quicksand and mud, and the tender, baggage and express car, and two second class cars, were shattered almost into kindling wood, and piled on top of the engine. The two first class passenger cars followed, and were torn to pieces and carried down the stream, while the sleeping car, although making the leap with the rest was less injured". There had been extreme rainfall in the area the previous afternoon and evening and it is thought that the culvert beneath the embankment became blocked causing build-up of water behind the embankment which collapsed as the train was crossing. The westbound train had passed over safely at 8:30 p.m.

One body was found in the St. Joseph River a mile below the creek; other bodies were discovered buried completely in sand and a week after the accident the death toll was 41 persons, though some sources estimate the death toll as much as 60 or 70.

The site of the accident is close to the present intersection of Ironwood Road and Lincoln Way West.
