= Wreck at the Fat Nancy =

1888 railroad accident in Virginia

Coordinates: 38.239167°N 78.149422°W

- Photograph taken after the accident

Details
- Date: July 12, 1888 morning
- Location: Orange County, Virginia
- Country: United States
- Line: Virginia Midland Railroad
- Incident type: Trestle collapse

Statistics
- Trains: 1
- Deaths: 9
- Injured: 26

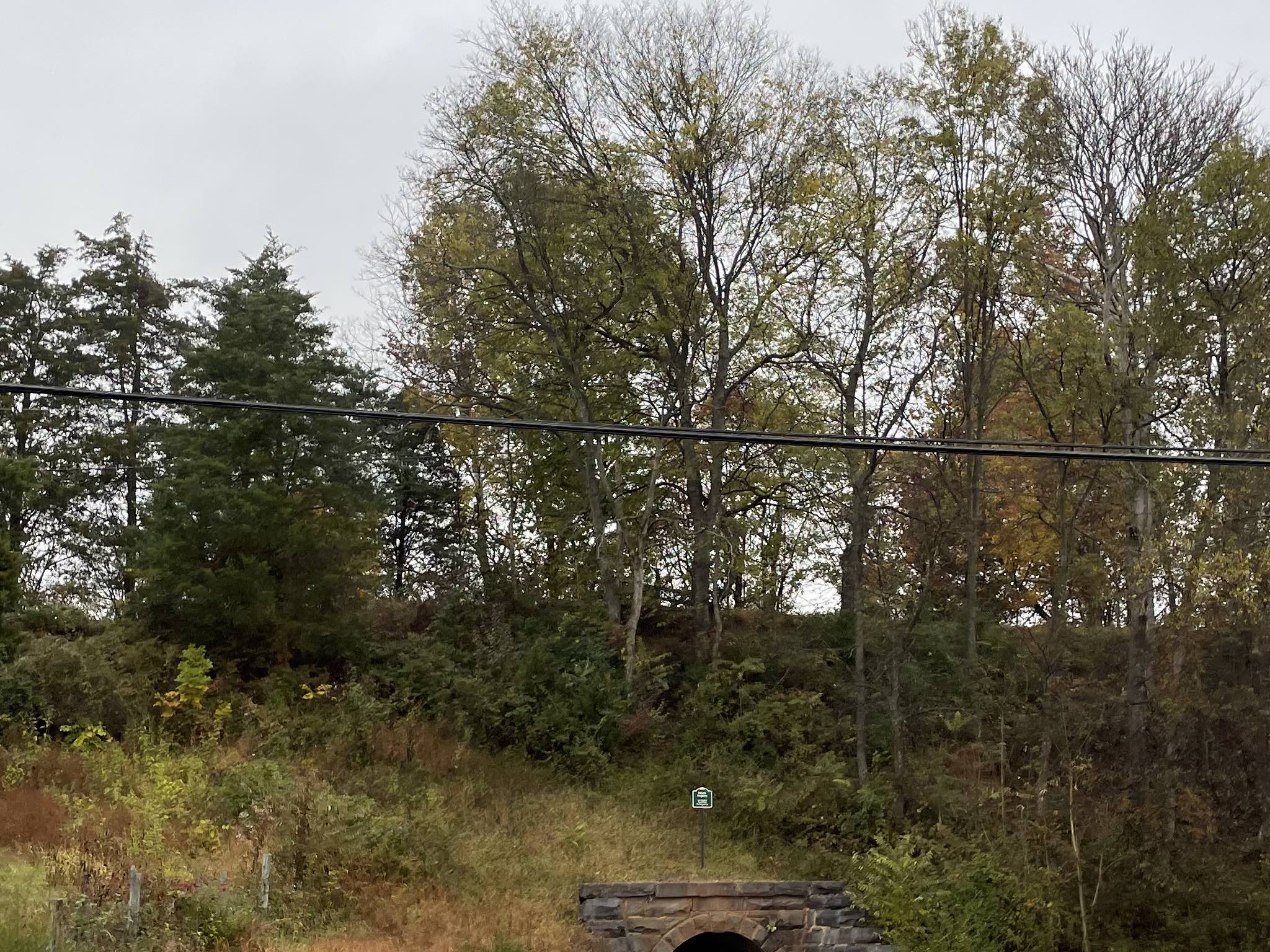
A tree-covered bluff atop a stone-clad culvert. A small sign can be seen planted above the culvert; it cannot be read clearly, but it says "private property."

The Wreck at the Fat Nancy was one of the largest railroad disasters in Virginia's history. On the morning of July 12, 1888, the incident occurred when a trestle collapsed as a passenger train was atop it. Virginia Midland Railroad's Train 52—"The Piedmont Airline"—was crossing the 44-foot-high (13 m), 487-foot-long (148 m) trestle known as the "Fat Nancy" when it gave way, sending the train to the ground.

By 1888, many states had experienced memorable wrecks with high death tolls. Though Virginia newspapers were full of reports of small train accidents, there were typically few deaths. The wreck at Fat Nancy was Virginia's first experience with a train crash that resulted in multiple deaths and large-scale injuries. Five passengers, one rail employee, one mail clerk, and one newsboy were killed and another mail clerk died from his injuries the following day. At least twenty-six were injured, though some reports list a higher number.

The incident is named for the trestle, known as the "Fat Nancy" for the woman who served as the trestle watcher. The trestle's official name was Browning Trestle, for the owners of the property on which it sits, or Two-Runs trestle for the creek that ran below. A local African-American woman who waved to train conductors and occasionally received a shovelful of coal inspired locals to rename the trestle as Fat Nancy's trestle. The Baltimore Sun reported that the woman's actual name was Emily Jackson and described a woman of "great size and uncouth appearance."

One of the deceased was Cornelius G. Cox, the civil engineer who had designed a culvert to replace the trestle, which was known to be unstable. After the collapse, the area was filled with earth and a granite culvert placed over the stream, per his design. One of the surviving passengers was former Confederate Lieutenant General James Longstreet, who was returning from the 25th reunion of the Battle of Gettysburg.

The culvert that replaced the trestle still stands today, where it allows Laurel Creek to flow through. Tracks no longer cross the culvert—they're now to the south. The Virginia Department of Historic Resources erected a historical marker at the site of the wreck, along Virginia State Route 20, in 2007. A keystone at the top of the arched tunnel is marked "In memory of Cornelius Cox."
