= Minot train derailment =

2002 railway incident in North Dakota, United States

Coordinates: 48°13′56″N 101°21′07″W

Details
- Date: January 18, 2002; 1:37 a.m.
- Location: Ward County, North Dakota, United States
- Operator: Canadian Pacific Railway
- Incident type: Derailment
- Cause: Joint fatigue, improper maintenance

Statistics
- Deaths: 1
- Injured: 333
- Damage: $10 million

The Minot train derailment occurred just west of Minot, North Dakota, United States, on January 18, 2002, when a Canadian Pacific Railway freight train derailed, spreading ammonia gas across the city, delaying rescue operations. The cause was found to be small fatigue cracks in the rails and joint bars, not detectable by the inspection routines then enforced by Canadian Pacific.

== Derailment ==
At about 1:37 a.m. CST, a Canadian Pacific (CP) train, which was led by CP SD9043MAC 9106 and CP AC4400CW 8631, derailed about four miles west of the city center, in a development called Tierrecita Vallejo in Harrison Township in Ward County. 31 of the 112 railcars on the train derailed. Five tanker cars carrying anhydrous ammonia ruptured, releasing a cloud of caustic, poisonous gas over the city. Soon after the derailment, a large area around the derailed train was evacuated, and residents in the remainder of the city were told to stay indoors. The accident killed one person, caused serious injuries to 11 more (including both of the train's crew members), and caused minor injuries to 322 others.

== Response ==
Dispatchers told residents to close doors and windows, boil water, and cover their faces with wet cloths to counteract the ammonia.

Emergency response to the disaster was disorganized. Local emergency managers did not activate the city's radio-based Emergency Alert System. The public siren system failed during the event and the 911 telephone system became overloaded. Because it was the middle of the night, there were few people at local radio stations, all operated by Clear Channel with mostly automated programming. No formal emergency warnings were issued for several hours while Minot officials located station managers at home. North Dakota's public radio network, Prairie Public Broadcasting, was notified and did broadcast warnings to citizens.

The incident has been cited as an example of the physical dangers of media consolidation and the cost-cutting practice of not keeping overnight staff at stations. Even without activation of the Emergency Alert System, a live announcer would still have been able to warn citizens of the emergency via the traditional means of the broadcast signal and an on-air microphone. As local stations were running in automated mode, there was nobody on-site to interrupt programming and issue warnings concerning the disaster.

By the morning of January 18, the cloud was dissipating, but covered a wider area of the city. Governor John Hoeven arrived on a North Dakota National Guard helicopter to survey the disaster, landing near Dakota Square Mall for a brief press conference.

== Investigation ==
The accident was investigated by the National Transportation Safety Board.

The NTSB determined that the train crew was operating their train at the appropriate speed through the region and adhering to operating procedures, and did not have alcohol or drugs in their system. Therefore, crew training or operation were ruled out as factors. The NTSB found evidence at the derailment site of fatigue cracking on the rail and on joint bars used to connect sections of track together. The joint bar failed, followed by failure of the rail itself, causing the train to derail. The NTSB determined that the railway was using visual inspection to inspect tracks in the area, and that this was inadequate to identify small fatigue cracks. As a result, the NTSB determined the probable cause of the derailment to be ineffective Canadian Pacific inspection and maintenance procedures, which resulted in failure to replace cracked joint bars before they fractured.

== Coverage and aftermath ==
The derailment made national news in the United States and Canada, though the CP involvement perhaps encouraged broader coverage in the latter. CBC reporters were on the scene the day of the disaster, and filed reports on the aftermath on the national news programs throughout the week, while ABC News provided only a short clip the day of the disaster.

Cleanup operations began around 24 hours after the wreck, as soon as the gas cloud had dissipated enough to allow workers to safely get near the train. As part of the operations, CP removed ammonia-contaminated ice from the Souris River to avoid further environmental damage. After the disaster, CP opened a claims office in Minot to avoid a larger lawsuit. Residents were offered $250.00 each as a settlement, waiving their rights to pursue a claim in court.

The NTSB estimated that the accident caused over $2 million in damages, and another $8 million in environmental cleanup costs.

Following the incident, the Minot city council imposed a speed limit on trains passing through the city.
