= Macdona, Texas =

- Interactive map of Macdona, Texas
- Coordinates: 29°19′14″N 98°41′50″W
- Country: United States
- State: Texas
- County: Bexar
- Elevation: 630 ft (190 m)
- GNIS feature ID: 2586958

Macdona is an unincorporated community and census-designated place in Bexar County, Texas, United States. As of the 2020 census, Macdona had a population of 464. Macdona lies along the Union Pacific rail line near Loop 1604 in southwest Bexar County. It is part of the San Antonio Metropolitan Statistical Area.

== History ==
Macdona was named for George Macdona, an Englishman, who owned the townsite. The first recorded sale of town lots was dated July 7, 1886. The Macdona post office (78054) opened in 1886. On September 1, 1909, the Artesian Belt opened a 42-mile (68 km) line between Macdona and Christine. In 2000, Macdona was reported to have 297 persons. The town is part of the 210 and 726 area code districts.

== Demographics ==
Historical population
Census	Pop.	Note	%±
2010	559		—
2020	464		−17.0%
U.S. Decennial Census; 1850–1900 1910; 1920 1930 1940; 1950 1960 1970; 1980 1990 2000; 2010 2020

Macdona first appeared as a census designated place in the 2010 U.S. census.

Macdona CDP, Texas – Racial and ethnic composition Note: the US Census treats Hispanic/Latino as an ethnic category. This table excludes Latinos from the racial categories and assigns them to a separate category. Hispanics/Latinos may be of any race.
Race / Ethnicity (NH = Non-Hispanic)	Pop 2010	Pop 2020	% 2010	% 2020
White alone (NH)	106	68	18.96%	14.66%
Black or African American alone (NH)	5	7	0.89%	1.51%
Native American or Alaska Native alone (NH)	0	1	0.00%	0.22%
Asian alone (NH)	3	5	0.54%	1.08%
Native Hawaiian or Pacific Islander alone (NH)	0	0	0.00%	0.00%
Other race alone (NH)	0	6	0.00%	1.29%
Mixed race or Multiracial (NH)	1	8	0.18%	1.72%
Hispanic or Latino (any race)	444	369	79.43%	79.53%
Total	559	464	100.00%	100.00%

== Climate ==
The climate in this area is characterized by hot, humid summers and generally mild to cool winters. According to the Köppen Climate Classification system, Macdona has a humid subtropical climate, abbreviated "Cfa" on climate maps.

== 2004 train derailment and chlorine gas poisoning ==
On June 28, 2004, a crash between BNSF and Union Pacific Railroad trains in Macdona resulted in the release of 9,400 US gallons (36,000 L; 7,800 imp gal) of liquid chlorine, which immediately vaporized into a cloud of chlorine gas that spread over a radius of at least 700 feet (210 m). Three people, the UP train conductor and two residents, died, and at least 40 others were injured.
