= 2022 Missouri train derailment =

2022 railroad accident in Missouri

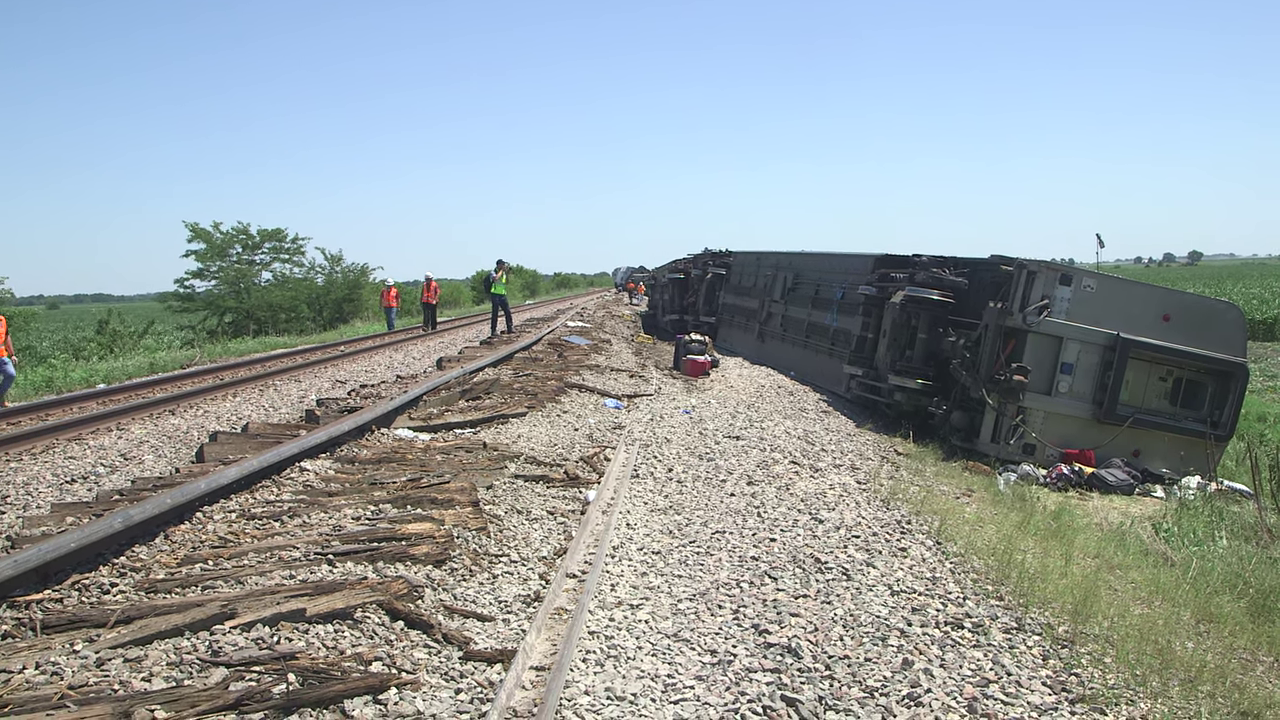
- Overturned train cars involved in the derailment

- Location within Missouri Location within the United States

Details
- Date: June 27, 2022; 4 years ago 12:42 p.m. CDT (UTC-5)
- Location: Near Mendon, Missouri
- Coordinates: 39°33′38″N 93°10′52″W
- Line: BNSF Southern Transcon (Marceline Subdivision)
- Operator: Amtrak
- Incident type: Collision, leading to a derailment
- Cause: Obstruction by a dump truck due to an improperly designed and constructed rail crossing

Statistics
- Trains: 1
- Vehicles: 1
- Passengers: 275 (approx.)
- Crew: 12
- Deaths: 4 (3 train passengers and the truck driver)
- Injured: 150 (approx.)

On June 27, 2022, the Southwest Chief, a passenger train operated by Amtrak, derailed near the small town of Mendon, Missouri. The derailment was caused by the train striking a dump truck that was obstructing the crossing of County Road 113, about three miles (4.8 km) southwest of Mendon. Four people were killed in the wreck: three passengers on board the train and the truck driver, with up to 150 people injured.

== Train ==
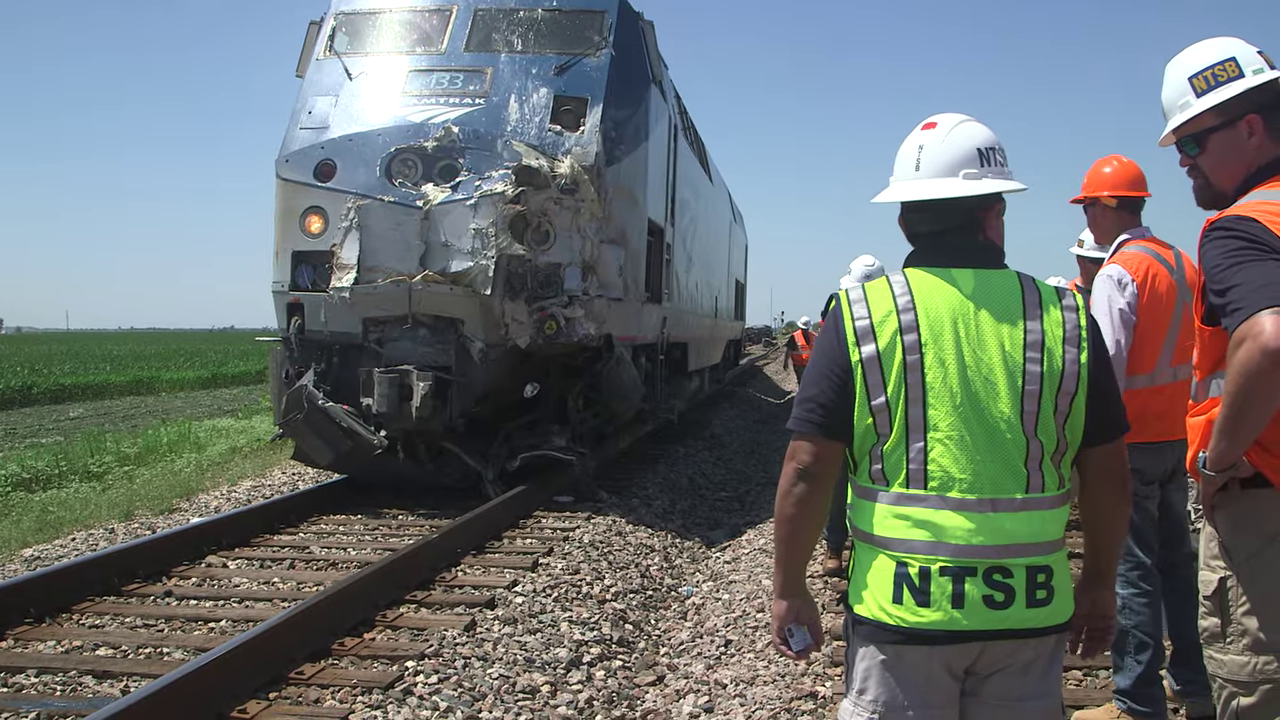
NTSB investigation party examines the lead locomotive involved in the 2022 Missouri train derailment

The train was traveling from Los Angeles to Chicago, with intermediate stops. There were approximately 275 passengers and 12 crew members onboard during the derailment. The train had two locomotives and eight passenger cars, all of which derailed. From front to rear, there were two GE Genesis P42DC locomotives (133 and 166), one Viewliner baggage car, and seven Superliner cars (a transition sleeper car, two sleeping cars, a dining car, a sightseer lounge/café car, and two coaches).

According to a lawsuit filed by a passenger who boarded in Gallup, New Mexico, Southwest Chief Train 4 was "overcrowded with passengers and luggage"; every seat was filled and the Viewliner luggage car could not accommodate all of the passengers' bags, so some luggage was stowed in passenger car lounges. By the time the train was passing through Kansas, it was running almost four hours behind schedule. When Train 4 was approaching Kansas City Union Station, the conductors announced that passengers intending to alight and connect to the Missouri River Runner would miss their connection, and they should stay onboard Train 4 instead, which exacerbated the overcrowded conditions when additional passengers boarded at Kansas City. After leaving Kansas City, conductors directed passengers to return to their assigned seats so the overflow passengers and their luggage could be accommodated in the observation car.

After the derailment, Amtrak P42DC 133 was severely damaged and was later put into storage at the Beech Grove Shops as of 2026. P42DC 166 was repaired and returned to service; however, it is now P42C NPCU 9701, according to the RR Pictures Archive.

== Derailment ==
Map showing the County Road 113 (Porche Prairie Avenue) crossing the of BNSF Marceline Subdivision, and the direction of the vehicles.

At 12:42 p.m. CDT (UTC-5), the Southwest Chief hit the rear end of a 2007 Kenworth W900B dump truck that was partially fouling the railroad crossing on County Road 113 (also known as Porche Prairie Avenue), a gravel road located approximately three miles (4.8 km) southwest of the small town of Mendon, Missouri. The fully loaded dump truck was owned by MS Contracting and was transporting construction aggregate north on CR 113 to an Army Corps of Engineers project near the crossing. Mendon is 80 miles (130 km) northwest of Columbia and nearly 100 miles (160 km) northeast of Kansas City.

According to telemetry data, the engineer of the Southwest Chief began blowing the locomotive's horn approximately 1/4 mile (400 m) from the crossing at a speed of 89 mph (143 km/h), below the speed limit of 90 mph (145 km/h), and had slowed to 87 mph (140 km/h) at the moment of impact. Both locomotives and all eight railcars derailed after the collision; seven of the eight railcars came to rest on their sides and the dump truck was pushed into a ditch northeast of the crossing. The damage to the track and rail equipment was estimated to be approximately US$4 million.

A positive train control system overlay exists for the Marceline Subdivision and was operating at the time of the collision. For this section, a BNSF train dispatcher in Fort Worth, Texas, coordinates train movements using its traffic control system.

Preliminary reports from the Missouri State Highway Patrol (MSHP) stated the train hit the dump truck at a passive grade crossing that was characterized as "uncontrolled", having only crossbuck signs and a stop sign to the right of the road for vehicles traveling north; the crossing lacked active features such as warning lights or mechanical arms. The rails run on an elevated berm approximately 9 ft (2.7 m) above the road surface and consequently the highway grade "approach ... is very, very steep"; in addition, the county had warned both the state of Missouri and BNSF in May 2022 that overgrown brush next to the crossing had compromised the visibility of rail traffic.

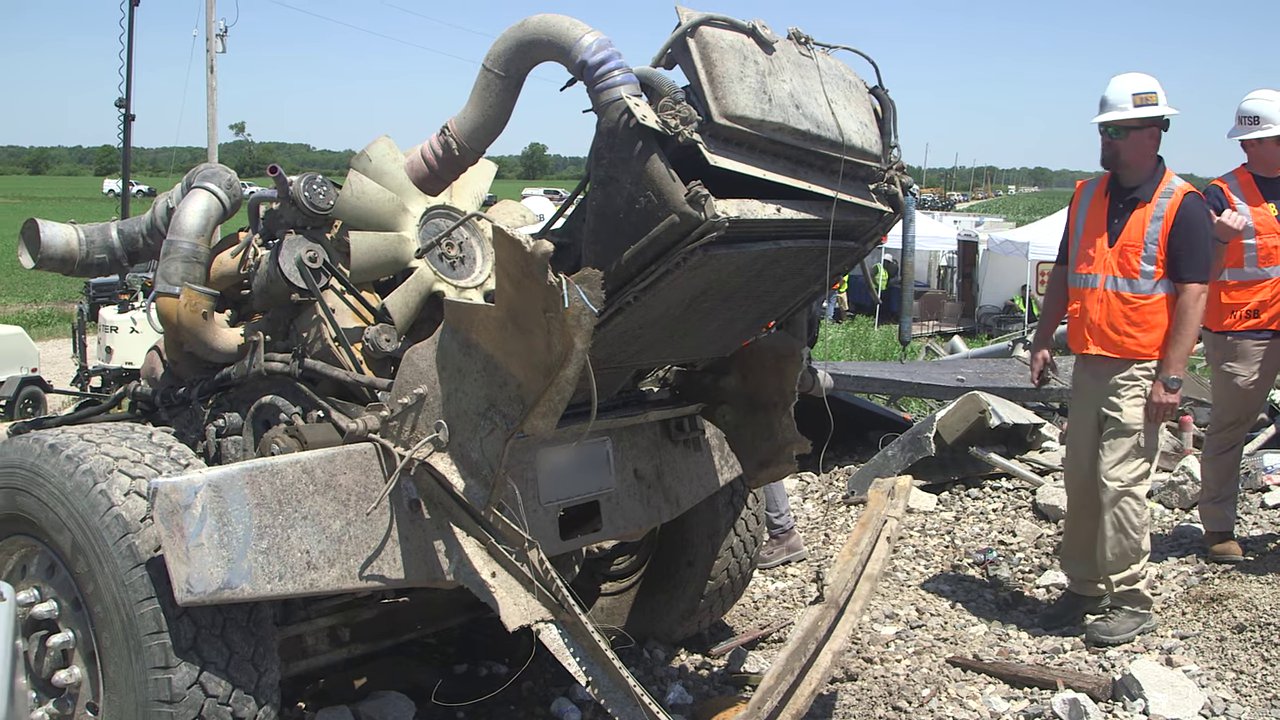
NTSB investigation party examines the truck involved in the 2022 Missouri train derailment

A train passenger told reporters that suddenly the car he was traveling in flipped over and the passengers, seats, bags, and other debris were tossed everywhere. After it stopped, he said, he could smell fumes everywhere, causing many to panic about the possibility of fire. Another passenger, traveling in a sleeper car, said the car rocked for a bit and the lights flickered before there was dust coming through his window. He grabbed his backpack before evacuating the train with other passengers, and then he and others helped other passengers reach the ground after evacuating the cars.

A group of Boy Scouts from Wisconsin was on board the train, returning from a trip to the Philmont Scout Ranch; they provided first aid to victims until emergency crews could reach the remote area. At least one Scout was credited with providing comfort to the truck driver until he died at the scene. About 20 emergency crews responded to the derailment. These crews included law enforcement, fire and ambulance services, and medical helicopter services. The first crews arrived within 20 minutes of receiving a 911 call. Locals who lived near to the tracks helped move first responders, the injured, and debris with their all-terrain vehicles.

== Victims ==
The truck driver, 54-year-old Billy Barton II, of Brookfield, Missouri, died shortly after the collision. Two train passengers, 58-year-old Rachelle Cook and 56-year-old Kim Cook, both of DeSoto, Kansas, also died at the scene. A third passenger, aged 82, of Kansas City, Missouri, died the next day at a hospital. A final tally by the MSHP counted up to 150 people injured, of which 40 were hospitalized. One day after the crash, 15 remained in hospitals.

== Investigation ==
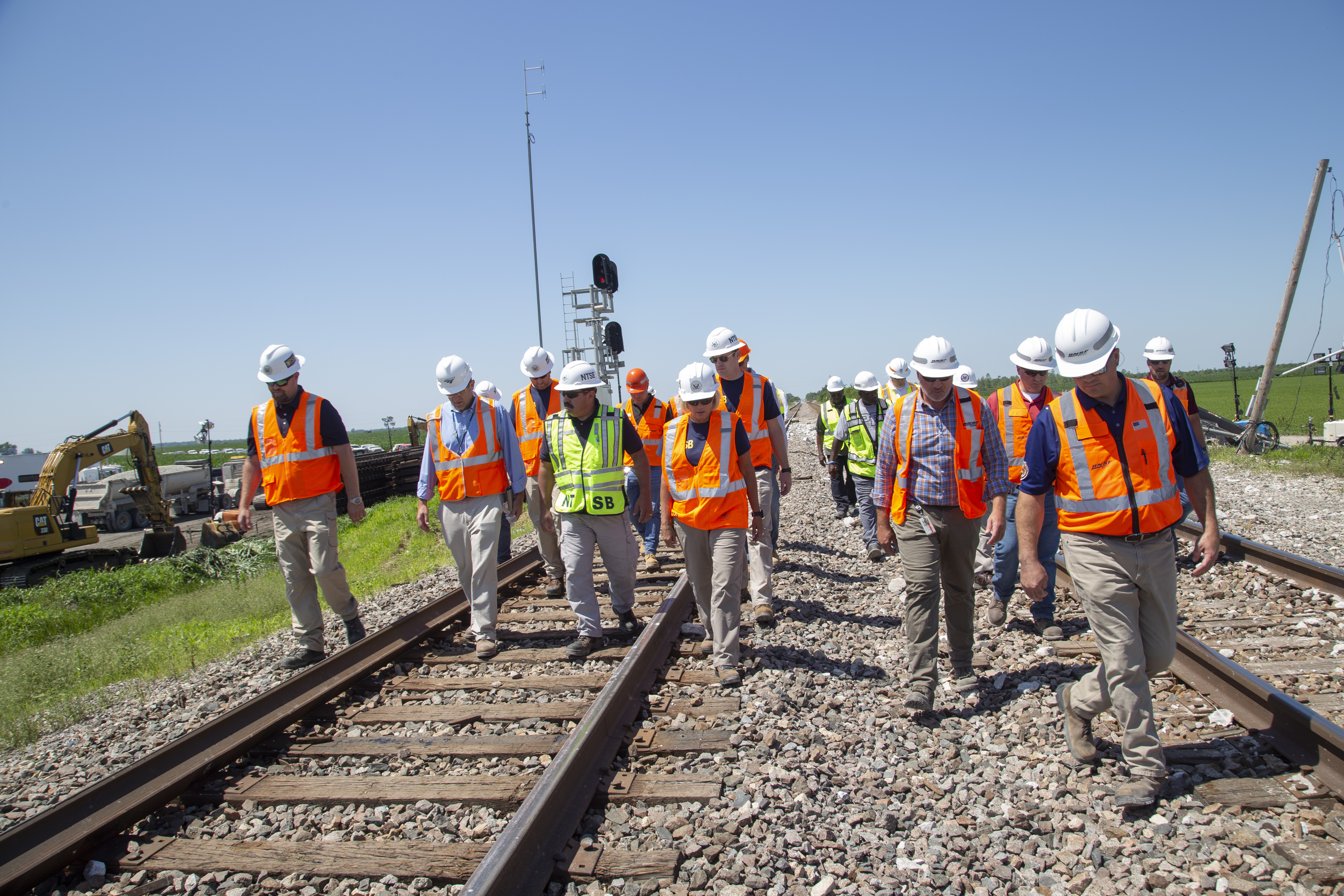
NTSB investigation party members walk the accident scene

The National Transportation Safety Board (NTSB) opened an investigation into the accident, dispatching a 16-member "go team", led by NTSB chair Jennifer Homendy, to the scene. The investigation gathered information from designated parties, including Amtrak, BNSF Railway (the owner of the tracks), and the Federal Railway Administration. As part of their investigation, the NTSB requested telemetry data and camera footage recorded by the Amtrak locomotive.

The wreck site on August 6, 2022. The intersection is shown looking to the north. The crossing is blocked off using railroad ties.

The grade crossing in question had been identified as dangerous in 2019 because it lacked gates and lights; visibility was compromised by the angle of the intersection between the road and tracks as well as overgrown brush next to the road; and because road vehicles had to climb a steep embankment to cross the tracks. Weeks before the disaster, a farmer had posted to Facebook about the danger it posed. The farmer had met with all three Chariton County commissioners and a safety official from the Missouri Department of Transportation (MoDOT) at the crossing in March 2021. According to a lawsuit filed by the widow of the truck driver, standards and regulations from AREMA, AASHTO, and the State of Missouri require a more gradual approach so that the surface of the roadway is nearly the same level as the rail (±3–6 in (76–152 mm) above top of rail) at a point 30 ft (9.1 m) from the outermost rail. The current recommendations from the Federal Highway Administration include keeping the angle of the intersection between road and tracks as perpendicular as possible to enhance the driver's view of the crossing and tracks, and minimizing changes in the roadway's vertical profile across the tracks.

In addition, prior to the accident, MoDOT had announced plans to improve the railroad crossing by adding crossing gates and lights. BNSF officials told the Kansas City Star that MoDOT had not asked the railway to perform an official review of the crossing, which was required before any upgrades can be implemented. NTSB Chair Homendy stated the estimated $400,000 it would cost to upgrade the crossing would be the joint responsibility of Chariton County, which owns the road; the state of Missouri; and BNSF, which owns the tracks. She also cited a 1998 NTSB report which made a recommendation to develop in-vehicle warning systems which could have alerted the truck's driver to the train's approach had it been implemented.

In the final report released in August 2023, the NTSB stated the dump truck driver failed to stop at the crossing as legally required, indicating the driver likely did not see the approaching train. The NTSB found that railroad crossing design: the steepness of the railroad crossing; angle of intersection; and obstructing vegetation were factors that led to the driver's decision to cross without stopping. The slope of the railroad crossing was found to be 13 times steeper then recommended by the American Association of State Highway and Transportation Officials (AASHTO). Additionally the intersection was 30 degrees more than recommended by the AASHTO.

== Legal ==
On June 29, 2022, an attorney in Chicago who was contacted by several train passengers announced the intent to file multiple lawsuits against Amtrak. Amtrak had modified the terms and conditions of its tickets in January 2019 to state that mandatory arbitration would be used to settle disputes, preventing passengers from filing lawsuits; this has drawn criticism from Congress, and both the House and Senate responded by simultaneously introducing bills to prohibit mandatory arbitration clauses. Both bills died in committee shortly after introduction in March 2020 and subsequently were re-introduced in October 2021.

On June 29, 2022, the widow of the truck driver filed a wrongful death lawsuit against Chariton County and the BNSF roadmaster that managed Maintenance of Way for the line. The suit stated the county "is responsible for properly ... maintaining its roads, which includes the approaches to the Porche crossing", and the roadmaster "should have known that the Porche crossing posed a grave danger to the public".

The next day, on June 30, Amtrak and BNSF Railway filed a federal lawsuit against MS Contracting, claiming the company's negligence led to the crash and derailment. MS Contracting asked for a stay and extension, stating that while the NTSB is completing its investigation, MS Contracting is unable to "fully and freely" respond to the suit.

On July 1, an injured passenger from Iowa filed suit against Amtrak, BNSF, and MS Contracting, faulting the negligent design of the crossing and "cattle car conditions" on the train. The same day, two additional lawsuits were filed against Amtrak, BNSF, and MS Contracting on behalf of two separate groups: four passengers and two Amtrak crew members.

On July 13, a wrongful death lawsuit was filed against MS Contracting and BNSF by the family of a person killed during the derailment. The suit alleges BNSF should have known the angle of the crossing made it dangerous.

On August 2, 2023, one of the lawsuits against MS Contracting, Amtrak and BNSF was dismissed after a settlement agreement was reached, while three lawsuits are pending in county circuit court, and four are pending in federal court.

BNSF reach a confidential settlement lawsuit with the Barton family on March 20, 2025. The Barton family gave up both their right to appeal and their right to a jury. As of April 7, 2025, the Barton family terms of the settlement is not publicly available. Two more lawsuits had settled to pay on November 10, 2025.

== Response ==
Missouri Governor Mike Parson stated that he was "saddened" by the accident and asked for prayers. Wisconsin Assemblymember Lee Snodgrass praised the Scouts' actions and offered thoughts and prayers to them and the other passengers. Philmont Scout Ranch general manager Roger Hoyt also praised the quick thinking and first aid provided by the Scouts.

In the year following the accident, Missouri allocated $50 million to upgrade rail crossings throughout the state. However, it is estimated that $700 million will be needed to improve the more than 1,400 rail crossings in Missouri.

== See also ==
- List of accidents on Amtrak
- 1999 Bourbonnais, Illinois, train crash – An accident in which an Amtrak train collided with a semi-trailer truck that was trying to beat the train across a grade crossing.
- 2015 Halifax train crash – An accident in which an Amtrak train struck a truck carrying an oversize load that was obstructing the line at a grade crossing.
- 2018 Crozet, Virginia train crash – An accident when an Amtrak train collided with a garbage truck on the track at a grade crossing.
