= List of accidents on Amtrak =

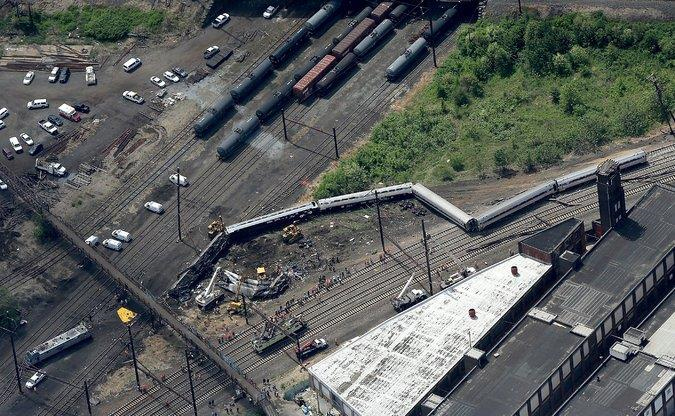
The 2015 derailment in Philadelphia, Pennsylvania

Amtrak has operated most intercity passenger rail transportation in the United States since May 1, 1971. This list contains serious incidents – those with deaths or more than 20 injuries of passengers or railroad personnel – that have involved Amtrak trains. (It does not include most grade crossing accidents and trespasser strikes that did not cause significant injury aboard the trains.) All serious incidents involving Amtrak are investigated by the National Transportation Safety Board (NTSB); incidents with suspected criminal activity (notably a 1995 wreck in Arizona) are also investigated by the Federal Bureau of Investigation (FBI).

The most number of fatalities in a single incident was 47 in the Big Bayou Canot crash in 1993, when the Sunset Limited fell off a bridge that had been struck by a barge eight minutes earlier. Five other incidents have caused ten or more deaths: a 1987 collision with freight locomotives in Maryland, a 1971 derailment in Illinois, a 1996 collision with a commuter train in Maryland, a 1999 grade crossing accident in Illinois, and a 1977 grade crossing accident in Florida. A 1990 derailment and collision with a commuter train in Massachusetts caused 453 injuries but no deaths.

Date	Train	Location	Type of incident	Deaths	Injuries	Description	NTSB report or docket
June 10, 1971	City of New Orleans	Salem, Illinois	Derailment	11	163	The train derailed due to a seized axle.	RAR-72-5
March 18, 1973	Broadway Limited	East Palestine, Ohio	Derailment	1	19		
May 30, 1974	Floridian	Winamac, Indiana	Derailment	0	29		
August 12, 1974	Silver Star	Wake Forest, North Carolina	Derailment	0	28		
October 1, 1975	Floridian	Pulaski, Tennessee	Derailment	0	31	The train derailed due to spreading of the rail.	RAR-76-6
November 19, 1975	Turboliner	Elwood, Illinois	Grade crossing	0	41	The train was struck by a dump truck at a grade crossing.	RHR-76-2
June 30, 1976	Panama Limited	Goodman, Mississippi	Derailment	1	51	The train derailed due to track failure, caused by oscillation of the train from poor track quality.	
December 15, 1976	Lone Star	Marland, Oklahoma	Grade crossing	3	11	The train struck a tanker truck at a grade crossing.	
December 16, 1976	San Francisco Zephyr	Ralston, Nebraska	Derailment	0	63	The train derailed due to defective track.	RAR-77-8
January 16, 1977	Floridian	New Castle, Alabama	Derailment	0	76	The train derailed due to oscillations from defective track.	RAR-77-9
October 2, 1977	Floridian	Plant City, Florida	Grade crossing	10	0	The train struck a pickup truck at a grade crossing, killing all ten occupants of the truck.	RHR-78-2
June 9, 1978	Montrealer	Seabrook, Maryland	Train collision	0	176	A Conrail commuter train collided with the rear end of the Amtrak train.	RAR-79-3
March 28, 1979	Empire Builder	Lohman, Montana	Derailment	0	48	The train derailed due to a cracked wheel.	RAR-79-7
April 20, 1979	Metroliner	Edison, New Jersey	Equipment collision	0	73	The train struck track maintenance equipment.	RAR-79-10
October 2, 1979	Southwest Limited	Lawrence, Kansas	Derailment	2	69	The train derailed on a curve due to excessive speed.	RAR-80-4
October 12, 1979	Shawnee	Harvey, Illinois	Train collision	2	44	The train collided with a parked Illinois Central Gulf Railroad freight train.	RAR-80-3
March 14, 1980	Empire Builder	East Glacier Park, Montana	Derailment	0	115	The train derailed on a curve while leaving East Glacier Park station.	RAR-80-6
April 2, 1980	Silver Star	Lakeview, North Carolina	Train collision	0	123	The train collided head-on with a Seaboard Coast Line freight train.	RAR-80-8
July 9, 1980	Quaker City	Linden, New Jersey	Equipment collision	1	17	The train struck a rail protruding from a work train.	RAR-80-12
November 7, 1980	Empire State Express	Dobbs Ferry, New York	Train collision	0	84	A Conrail freight train collided with the Amtrak train.	RAR-81-04
March 29, 1982	Benjamin Franklin	Bristol, Pennsylvania	Train collision	0	32	A locomotive sent to rescue the disabled train collided with it.	RAR-82-05
June 15, 1982	San Francisco Zephyr	Emerson, Iowa	Derailment	1	27	The train derailed due to flooding of the tracks.	RAR-83-02
June 23, 1982	Coast Starlight	Gibson, California	Fire	2	61	A fire of unknown cause took place in a passenger car.	RAR-83-03
April 3, 1983	Crescent	Rockfish, Virginia	Derailment	0	24	The train derailed due to debris from a landslide.	RAR-83-10
July 28, 1983	State House	Wilmington, Illinois	Grade crossing	0	21	The train struck a delivery truck at the grade crossing.	RAR-84-02
November 12, 1983	Eagle	Woodlawn, Texas	Derailment	4	72	The train derailed due to a cracked rail.	RAR-85-01
March 5, 1984	Silver Star	Kittrell, North Carolina	Derailment	0	52	The train derailed due to a broken axle on a locomotive.	RAR-85-03
May 29, 1984	Capitol Limited	Connellsville, Pennsylvania	Derailment	0	23	The train derailed due to a collapsed culvert.	RAR-86-01-SUM
July 7, 1984	Montrealer	Williston, Vermont	Derailment	5	29	The train derailed due to a collapsed culvert.	RAR-85-14
July 11, 1984	Silver Star	McBee, South Carolina	Grade crossing	2	5	The train struck a gasoline tanker at a grade crossing.	
July 23, 1984	Shoreliner; New England Zip	Queens, New York	Train collision	1	140	The two trains collided head-on on the Hell Gate Line viaduct.	RAB-85-07; RAR-85-09
April 16, 1985	California Zephyr	Granby, Colorado	Derailment	0	32	The train derailed due to debris from a landslide.	RAR-86-01-SUM
October 9, 1986	Empire Builder	Fall River, Wisconsin	Derailment	1	30	The train derailed at a crossover due to an improperly designed signal system.	RAR-87-06
January 4, 1987	Colonial	Chase, Maryland	Train collision	16	174	The train collided with three Conrail locomotives that had failed to stop at a signal.	RAR-88-01
October 12, 1987	California Zephyr	Russell, Iowa	Train collision	0	112	The train collided with a work train due to an improperly set switch.	RAR-88-04
January 29, 1988	Night Owl	Chester, Pennsylvania	Equipment collision	0	24	The train struck track maintenance equipment.	RAR-89-01
August 5, 1988	Empire Builder	Saco, Montana	Derailment	0	106	The train derailed due to a track defect.	RAR-89-03
September 28, 1989	Crescent	Catlett, Virginia	Grade crossing	3	81	The train struck a fire engine at a grade crossing.	
December 19, 1989	Gold Runner	Stockton, California	Grade crossing	3	50	The train struck a tractor-trailer at a grade crossing.	RHR-90-01
April 23, 1990	California Zephyr	Batavia, Iowa	Derailment	0	86	The train derailed due to improperly installed track.	RAR-91-05
May 2, 1990	Hoosier State	Crawfordsville, Indiana	Train collision	0	30	The train was mistakenly diverted onto a siding and collided with freight cars.	
May 3, 1990	City of New Orleans	Durant, Mississippi	Grade crossing	0	41	The train struck a log truck at a grade crossing.	
December 12, 1990	Night Owl	Boston, Massachusetts	Derailment; Train collision	0	453	The train derailed due to excessive speed on a curve and collided with an MBTA Commuter Rail train at Back Bay station.	RAR-92-01
July 31, 1991	Silver Star	Lugoff, South Carolina	Derailment	8	77	The train derailed due to a set of switch points moving under the train.	RAR-93-02
April 29, 1992	Colonial	Newport News, Virginia	Grade crossing	1	54	The train struck a dump truck at a grade crossing.	
August 12, 1992	Colonial	Newport News, Virginia	Derailment	0	74	The train derailed due to a sabotaged switch.	
September 22, 1993	Sunset Limited	Mobile, Alabama	Derailment	47	103	The train struck a bridge that had been pushed out of alignment by a barge collision, fell into a river, and caught fire.	RAR-94-01
May 16, 1994	Silver Meteor	Selma, North Carolina	Train collision	1	121	The train collided with a trailer that was falling off a passing CSX freight train.	RAR-95-02
August 3, 1994	Lake Shore Limited	Batavia, New York	Derailment	0	118	The train derailed due to a track defect.	RAR-96-02
October 9, 1995	Sunset Limited	Palo Verde, Arizona	Derailment	1	78	The train derailed due to sabotage of the rails.	
February 16, 1996	Capitol Limited	Silver Spring, Maryland	Train collision	11	26	The train collided with a MARC commuter train that had overrun a signal.	RAR-97-02
November 23, 1996	Fast Mail / Carolinian	Secaucus, New Jersey	Derailment	0	43	The Fast Mail derailed on the Portal Bridge, sideswiping the Carolinian.	SIR-97-01
August 9, 1997	Southwest Chief	Kingman, Arizona	Derailment	0	183	The train derailed due to a damaged bridge.	RAR-98-03
December 20, 1998	Texas Eagle	Arlington, Texas	Derailment	0	22	The train derailed due to a track defect.	RAR-01-02
March 15, 1999	City of New Orleans	Bourbonnais, Illinois	Grade crossing	11	122	The train struck a tractor-trailer at a grade crossing.	RAR-02-01
February 5, 2001	Empire Service	Syracuse, New York	Train collision	0	62	The train collided with a CSX freight train.	RAR-01-04
March 17, 2001	California Zephyr	Nodaway, Iowa	Derailment	1	77	The train derailed due to a track defect.	RAB-02-01
September 13, 2001	California Zephyr	Salduro, Utah	Train collision	0	24	The train collided with a Union Pacific freight train.	
April 18, 2002	Auto Train	Crescent City, Florida	Derailment	4	142	The train derailed due to a heat-induced kink in the track.	RAR-03-02
July 29, 2002	Capitol Limited	Kensington, Maryland	Derailment	0	95	The train derailed due to a track defect.	RAB-04-05
April 1, 2003	Pacific Surfliner	San Juan Capistrano, California	Employee collision	2	0	The train struck two track workers.	RAB-04-01
May 6, 2003	Silver Star	Hinesville, Georgia	Grade crossing	2	27	The train struck a lumber truck at a grade crossing.	
April 6, 2004	City of New Orleans	Flora, Mississippi	Derailment	1	46	The train derailed due to a track defect.	RAR-05-02
April 3, 2005	Empire Builder	Home Valley, Washington	Derailment	0	30	The train derailed due to a track defect.	RAB-06-03
November 30, 2007	Pere Marquette	Chicago, Illinois	Train collision	0	74	The train collided with a Norfolk Southern Railway freight train.	RAR-09-01
March 13, 2008	Acela	Providence, Rhode Island	Employee collision	1	2	The train struck two track workers.	RAB-09-04
June 24, 2011	California Zephyr	Fallon, Nevada	Grade crossing	6	16	The train was struck by a tractor-trailer at a grade crossing.	HAR-12-03
October 29, 2014	Empire Service	Clermont, New York	Employee collision	1	0	The train struck a track worker.	RAB-15-06
March 9, 2015	Carolinian	Halifax, North Carolina	Grade crossing	0	74	The train struck a truck with an oversize load at a grade crossing.	HQ-2015-1025
May 12, 2015	Northeast Regional	Philadelphia, Pennsylvania	Derailment	8	185	The train derailed due to excessive speed on a curve.	RAR-16-02
March 14, 2016	Southwest Chief	Cimarron, Kansas	Derailment	0	28	The train derailed due to track damage caused by an agricultural vehicle.	RAB-17-11
April 3, 2016	Palmetto	Chester, Pennsylvania	Equipment collision	2	39	The train struck a backhoe being used for track work.	RAR-17-02
June 27, 2017	Northeast Regional	Washington, D.C.	Employee collision	2	0	The train struck two CSX workers walking along their train.	RAB-19-01
December 18, 2017	Amtrak Cascades	DuPont, Washington	Derailment	3	65	The train derailed due to excessive speed on a curve.	RAR-19-01
January 31, 2018	Charter train	Crozet, Virginia	Grade crossing	1	9	The train struck a garbage truck at a grade crossing	HAB-19-03
February 4, 2018	Silver Star	Cayce, South Carolina	Train collision	2	92	The train collided with a stopped CSX freight train.	RAR-19-02
September 25, 2021	Empire Builder	Joplin, Montana	Derailment	3	50	The train derailed due to a track defect.	RIR-23-08
June 27, 2022	Southwest Chief	Mendon, Missouri	Grade crossing	4	150	The train derailed after colliding with a dump truck obstructing a railroad crossing.	RIR-23-09
