= Occupation crossing =

Land law

An occupation crossing allows a landowner whose land is split in two by a (new) railway (or road) to retain access from one parcel of land to the other. Where is crossing a railway line, it is a special kind of railway level crossing.

== Introduction ==
In Victoria, this is authorised by section 36 of the original Act. Occupation crossings were historically granted to a landowner under Section 36 of the Lands Compensation Statute 1869 VIC and the subsequent corresponding legislation being Section 43 (2) of the Land Acquisition and Compensation Act 1986 VIC. Other states would have similar Acts.

However, in the case of Stockinbingal, on the new Inland Railway things are not that simple. Some railway land that is no longer used needs to be allocated to one or other of the adjacent landowners, while other lands are cut off from their original owners and would best be transferred to the other side, with compensation. This is because there are small pockets of land with awkward shapes, and other characteristics. There may need to be a Section 36A that permits all the neighbouring land owners and the railway authorities, once they have agreed amongst themselves, to allocate the remaining pockets of odd land as they see fit.

== Types of Occupation Crossings ==
- level crossing of owner's access and railway;
  - this is problematic if train speeds are high or visibility of approaching trains is poor;
  - With some kind of level crossing warning signals.
  - communication via phone with signaller for permission to cross.
  - communication via emails, etc., from signalling system.
- overpass or overbridge; possibly expensive unless convenient cutting is available.
- under pass with normal clearances; expensive unless convenient embankment is available.
- under pass with limited clearances for humans, livestock, and low height farm machinery;
  - sometimes spare spans of an existing bridge or culvert is available.
- access via existing alternate routes;
- where new or altered fences and gates are needed, under the NSW Dividing Fences Act, the cost can be shared, or alternately the railway supplies the material and the land owner provides the labour. Old obsolete railway rails can be used to make strong fence posts.

== Land Acquisition ==
The Inland Railway project requires land acquisition.

=== Stockinbingal ===
This is a work in progress, and while the design of the tracks is near perfect from the railway point of view, the effect on land ownership is messy. Only one site for an occupation underpass is obviously workable (near the overbridge), while other sites need more study.

Stockinbingal Land Ownership, Occupational crossings and Fences

There is a very small area of Paddock cut off from its parent paddock (A) which is hardly worth keeping unless whole of area Z is claimed. Area Z might best be attached to Paddock B. Lastly area Z might be sold to someone else given that the odd shape makes it suitable for little else but agistment of sheep or goats. Is livestock happy with the darkness of the underpass or are they wary of it?

Note that former railway lands may be contaminated by oil spills from trains, or from herbicides used to keep down weeds.

It is undesirable that area Z be accessed by road/rail level crossing(s).

== See also ==
- Diamond crossing
- Double junction
