= 2019 Westbury train collision =

Grade crossing collision in Long Island

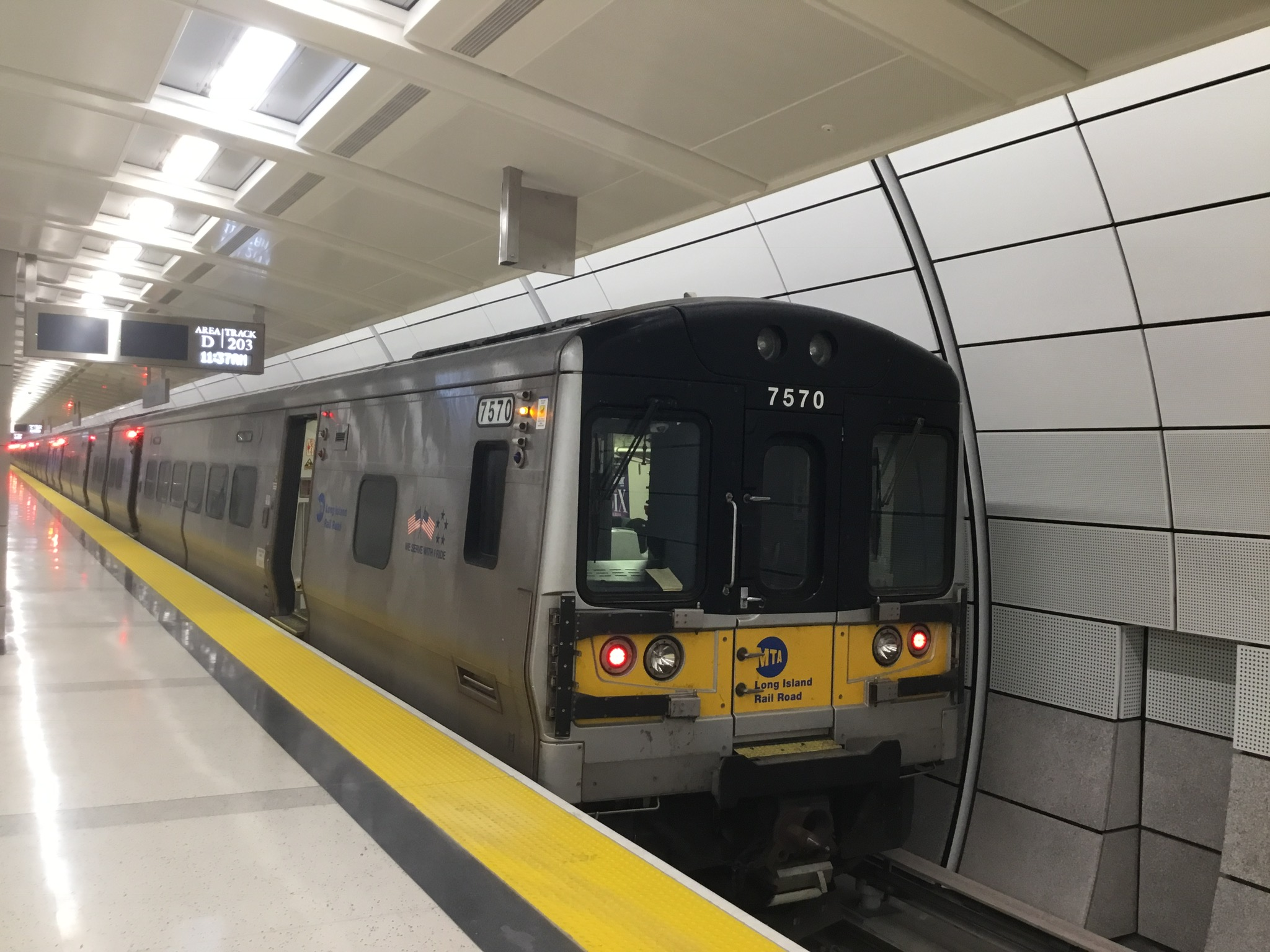
- Train similar to the ones involved in the collision

Details
- Date: February 26, 2019; ~7:20 pm
- Location: Westbury, New York
- Coordinates: 40°45′14″N 73°35′01″W
- Country: United States
- Line: Long Island Rail Road
- Incident type: Collision with vehicle on rail

Statistics
- Trains: 2
- Vehicles: 1
- Passengers: 200-1000
- Deaths: 3
- Injured: 3-7

The 2019 Westbury train collision was a level crossing collision that involved one vehicle and two separate trains heading in opposite directions. One of the trains derailed and collided into a nearby platform. It was later revealed that the vehicle involved was fleeing the scene of a car accident.

== Accident ==
On February 26, 2019, at around 7:20 pm, a vehicle containing three passengers drove past a down crossing gate, signaling a train was approaching. There were two trains about to cross this intersection; one of the trains was heading westward, and the other was going eastward. The eastbound train struck the car first, but kept traveling until it could fully brake. The proceeding westbound train then struck the vehicle, then derailed, only coming to an abrupt stop as it collided into a rail platform. The car burst into flames as it was struck and dragged by the train.

The three in the vehicle were killed instantly. An additional three on the train that derailed were taken to a nearby hospital in serious condition.

== Victims ==
Two of the three fatalities were immediately identified in the crash. They were Miguel Angel Jimenez Luna (36) and Saul Martinez Caravantes (28), and Jesus Hernandez. The three victims all worked together at the same grocery store and were believed to be trying to beat the train after the crossing signals were lowered.

== Aftermath ==
As a direct result of the accident, New York senator Kevin Thomas proposed a bill to install security cameras at rail crossings along the line in hopes of identifying other drivers who attempt to cross active rail lines when passing signals are in effect.

It was later revealed the driver of the vehicle was fleeing the scene of an earlier accident. The prior accident was only deemed "minor", but the driver still left the scene.

== See also ==
- 1982 LIRR Herricks Road train crash - Train collision also caused by a vehicle trying to beat the gates resulting in 9 deaths.
- 2005 Glendale train crash - Train derailment and collision also caused by a vehicle on the tracks resulting in 11 deaths.
- Valhalla train crash - Rail crossing accident in New York that resulted in six deaths.
