= 2017 Washington train derailment =

2017 train accident in Washington, US

2017 DuPont train derailment
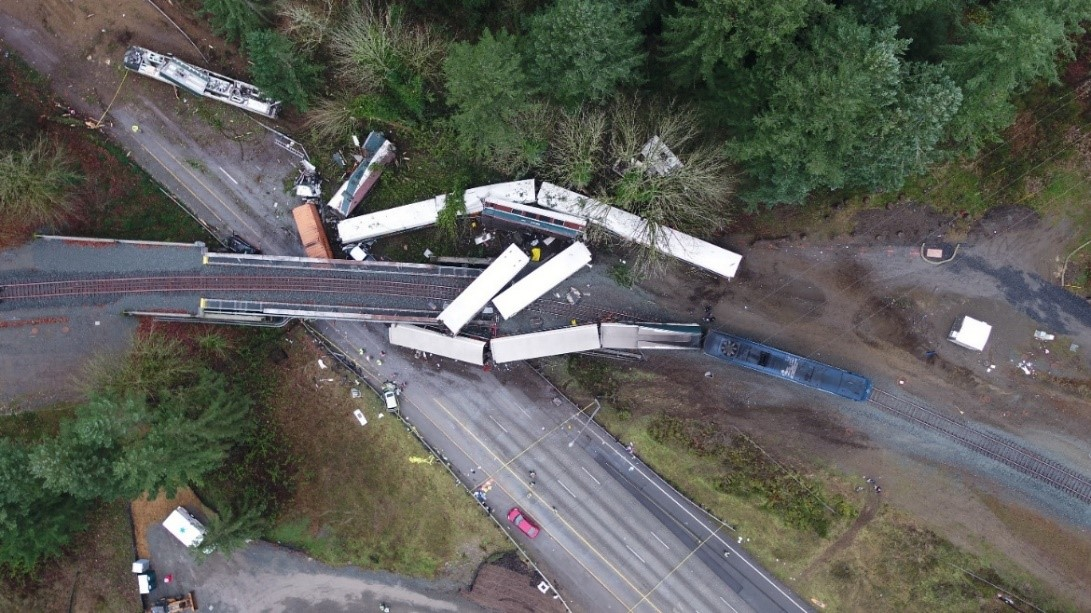
- Aerial view of the wreckage after the derailment.

- Location within Washington (state) Location within the United States

Details
- Date: December 18, 2017; 8 years ago 07:33 a.m. local time (15:33 UTC)
- Location: Near DuPont, Washington, U.S.
- Coordinates: 47.0820°N 122.6757°W
- Country: United States
- Line: Point Defiance Bypass
- Operator: Amtrak
- Incident type: Derailment caused by overspeed
- Cause: Technological error and poor training

Statistics
- Trains: 1 (Amtrak Cascades no. 501)
- Vehicles: 8
- Passengers: 77
- Crew: 6
- Deaths: 3
- Injured: 65 (57 on train, 8 in road vehicles)

On December 18, 2017, Amtrak Cascades passenger train 501 derailed near DuPont, Washington, United States. The National Transportation Safety Board's (NTSB) final report said regional transit authority Sound Transit failed to take steps to mitigate a curve at the accident location and inadequately trained the train engineer. The train was making the inaugural run of the Point Defiance Bypass, a new passenger rail route south of Tacoma, Washington, operated by Amtrak in partnership with state and local authorities in Oregon and Washington, on right-of-way owned and operated by Sound Transit. The bypass was intended to reduce congestion and separate passenger and freight traffic. It was designed for faster speeds and shorter travel times, saving ten minutes from Seattle to Portland compared with the previous route used by Cascades.

The lead locomotive and all twelve cars derailed at 07:33 a.m. local time on the curve just before a bridge over Interstate 5 (I-5). The trailing locomotive remained on the rails. A number of automobiles on southbound I-5 were crushed, and three people on board the train died. The train derailed a short distance before the location where the new route merged with the previous route.

Preliminary information from the data recorder showed that the train was traveling at 78 mph (126 km/h) at the time of the incident, nearly 50 mph (80 km/h) over the speed limit for the curve.

== Background ==
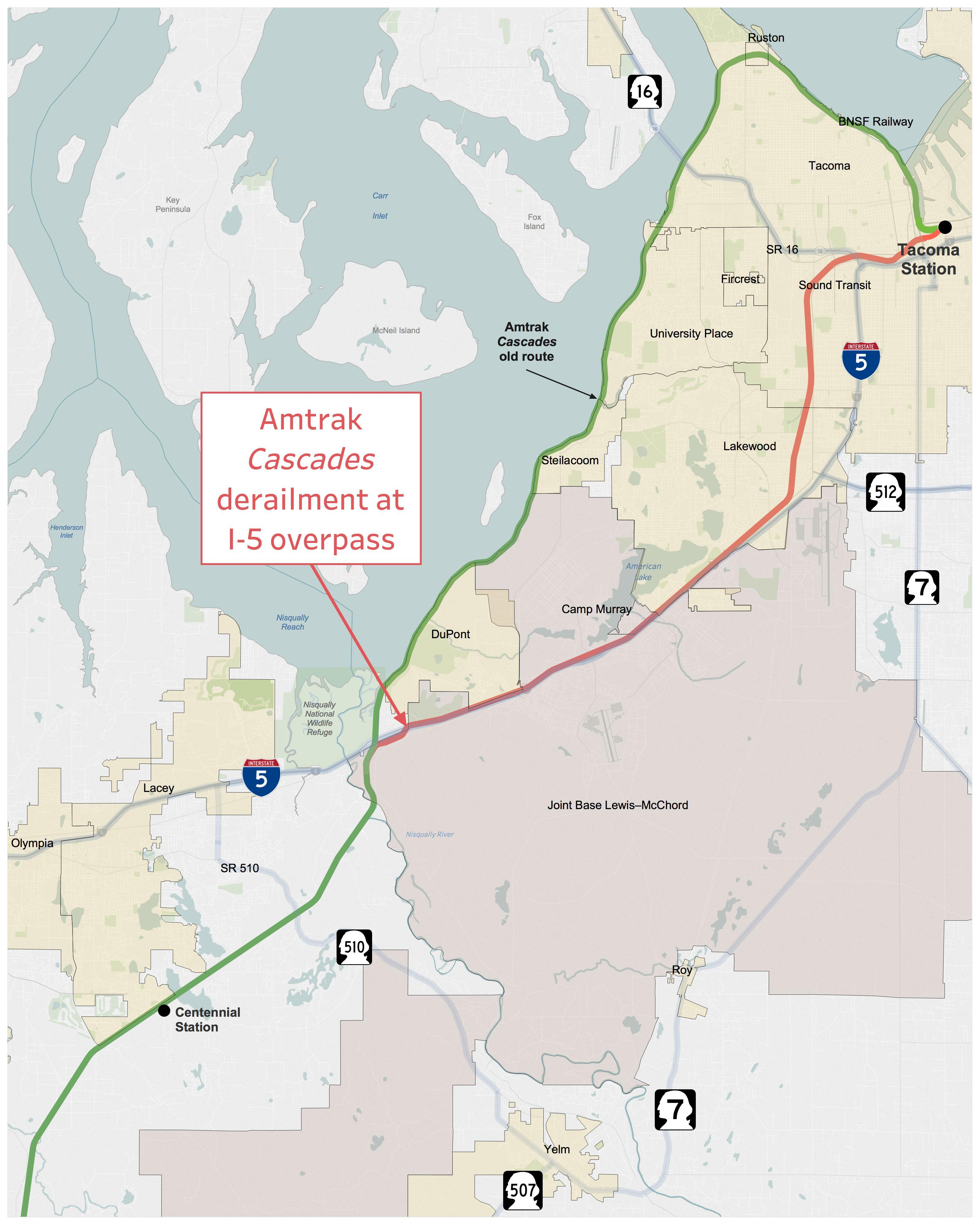
Overview of new Amtrak Cascades inland route (red; to the south), showing accident location, and old shoreline route (green; to the north)

The Point Defiance Bypass was built from 2010 to 2017 as a replacement for the BNSF mainline that runs along the Puget Sound coast between the Nisqually River and Tacoma. The $181 million bypass, using an inland route that follows I-5, was built by the Washington State Department of Transportation (WSDOT) on right of way owned by Sound Transit, the regional transit authority. The Amtrak Cascades service is a joint effort of WSDOT and Oregon Department of Transportation, with Amtrak as a contracting operator. In the wake of the December 18 derailment, the safety of the bypass was questioned by elected officials. The 2006 Cascades corridor plan recommended that the curve and overpass where the derailment occurred be replaced with a straighter alignment, costing $412 million. The final plans omitted the overpass replacement, with a smaller budget of $180 million granted for the entire project.

According to multiple reports, days before the derailment, engineers and conductors warned their supervisors that they did not feel adequately trained on the new route, reporting rushed and "totally inadequate" training such that they felt dangerously unprepared.

== Derailment ==
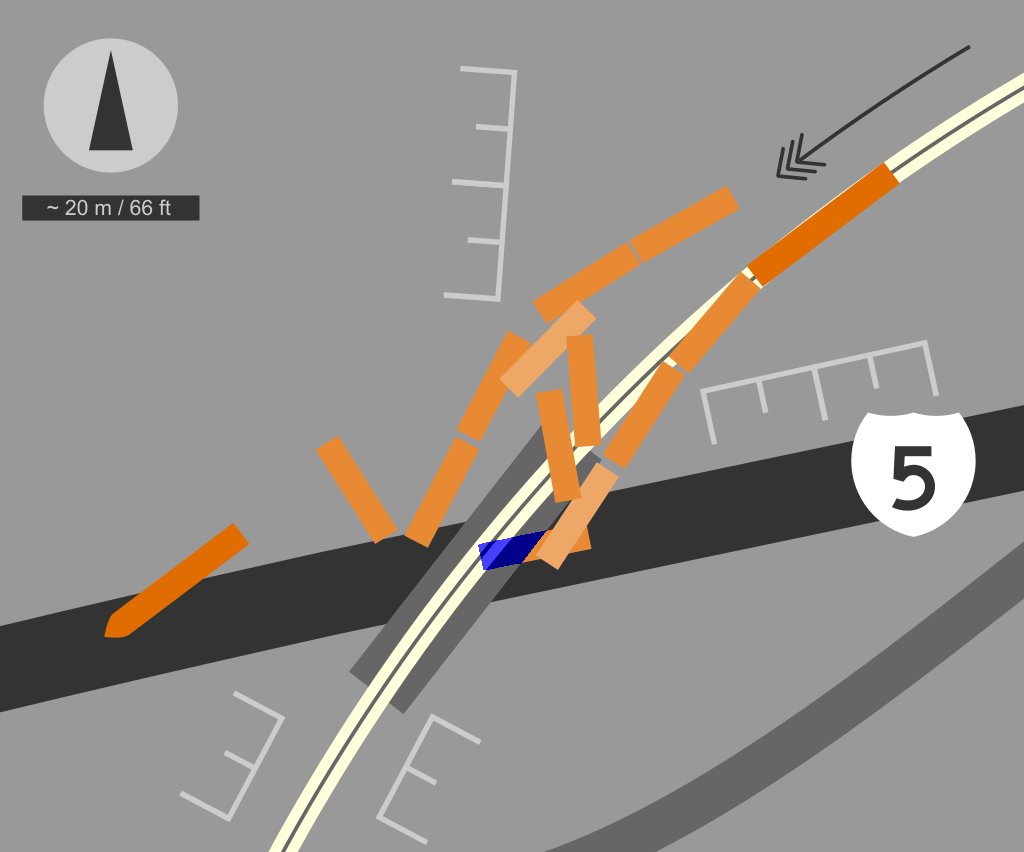
Schematic site overview. The lead locomotive is the leftmost vehicle and stopped in the southbound lanes of Interstate 5. The train's rear locomotive is top-right. One car lies inverted under the bridge (shown in blue).

At 07:33 a.m. local time (15:33 UTC), the leading locomotive and twelve cars of the southbound Amtrak Cascades number 501 passenger train derailed southwest of DuPont. DuPont is about 40 mi (64 km) south of Seattle and about 5 mi (8 km) south of the Joint Base Lewis–McChord (JBLM) main gate. The train derailed while approaching the railroad bridge across southbound Interstate 5 near Mounts Road, which contains a left-hand bend.

The lead locomotive, the then brand-new Siemens Charger No. 1402, and six rail cars, went down the embankment to the west of the bridge (to the train's right, in the original direction of travel). The locomotive ended up on I-5 and spilled about 350 US gal (290 imp gal; 1,300 L) of fuel. Two further cars ended up on the bridge span, and three cars went off the railroad bridge abutment on the opposite side, some onto I-5. Only the trailing General Electric Genesis P42DC locomotive, No. 181, remained on the tracks. Seven vehicles, including two trucks, were damaged by the derailed cars of the train.

The southbound train was operating from Seattle, Washington to Portland, Oregon, on the first revenue service run of the Cascades on the new, faster Point Defiance Bypass route between Lacey and Tacoma. The train was running about 30 minutes behind schedule. Amtrak CEO Richard Anderson said that positive train control was not active on the track, a factor cited in two accidents in Spuyten Duyvil and in Port Richmond, Philadelphia.

== Casualties ==
There were five Amtrak employees, a technician from train manufacturer Talgo, and 77 passengers on board the train at the time of the derailment. Three passengers were killed while 57 more passengers and crew members were injured. Eight road vehicles were damaged in the accident. Of the ten people in them, eight were injured. All three deceased were in the seventh coach of the train. Ten of the injured were in serious condition, and thirteen had moderate or minor injuries. In total, more than 80 people were injured. Treatment was provided at hospitals including Madigan Army Medical Center at JBLM, Capital Medical Center in Olympia, Providence St. Peter Hospital in Olympia, St. Anthony Hospital in Gig Harbor, Tacoma General Hospital, Good Samaritan Hospital in Puyallup, and St. Clare Hospital in Lakewood. Three soldiers from JBLM, including a Madigan Army Medical Center nurse, left their vehicles to give medical assistance to people trapped inside the train cars, and help them escape.

The three passengers killed in the derailment were train enthusiasts, including two members of rail advocacy group All Aboard Washington.

== Aftermath ==
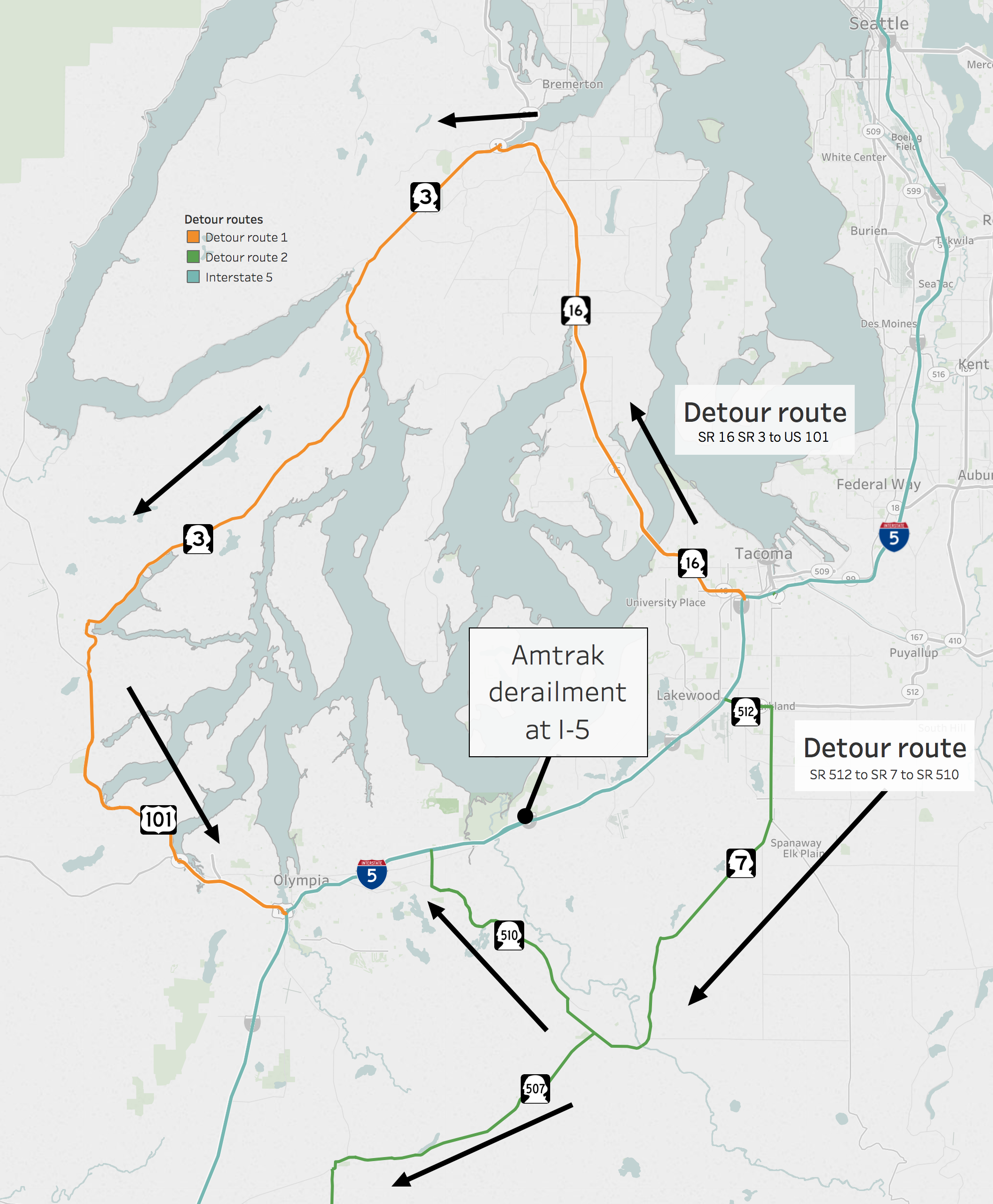
WSDOT-recommended detour routes on the evening of December 18 extended more than 70 mi (110 km) for the northern route with a travel time over 90 minutes, or alternatively, a southern route of 50 mi (80 km), with a travel time over 2 hours. Under normal conditions, driving 29 mi (47 km) from Tacoma to Olympia takes about 30 minutes.

Amtrak temporarily suspended service for south of Seattle for several hours because of the accident, resuming on the former coast route and the old Tacoma station. Southbound automobile traffic was rerouted away from I-5 by WSDOT until the site was cleared of debris and inspected. On December 18, JBLM allowed southbound traffic through from DuPont to State Route 510 near Lacey.

WSDOT announced on December 21 that it would not resume Amtrak service on the Point Defiance Bypass until positive train control was implemented in 2018. The accident caused at least $40 million in damage, including the cost of the trainset, damage to vehicles, and damage to the overpass.

=== Cleanup and freeway reopening ===
Some of the wrecked train cars were removed by trucks on December 19. Two southbound lanes of I-5 were reopened on December 20, with a reduced speed limit, as the cleanup and investigation continued. By the morning of December 21, all lanes of the freeway had been reopened.

=== Fate of rolling stock ===
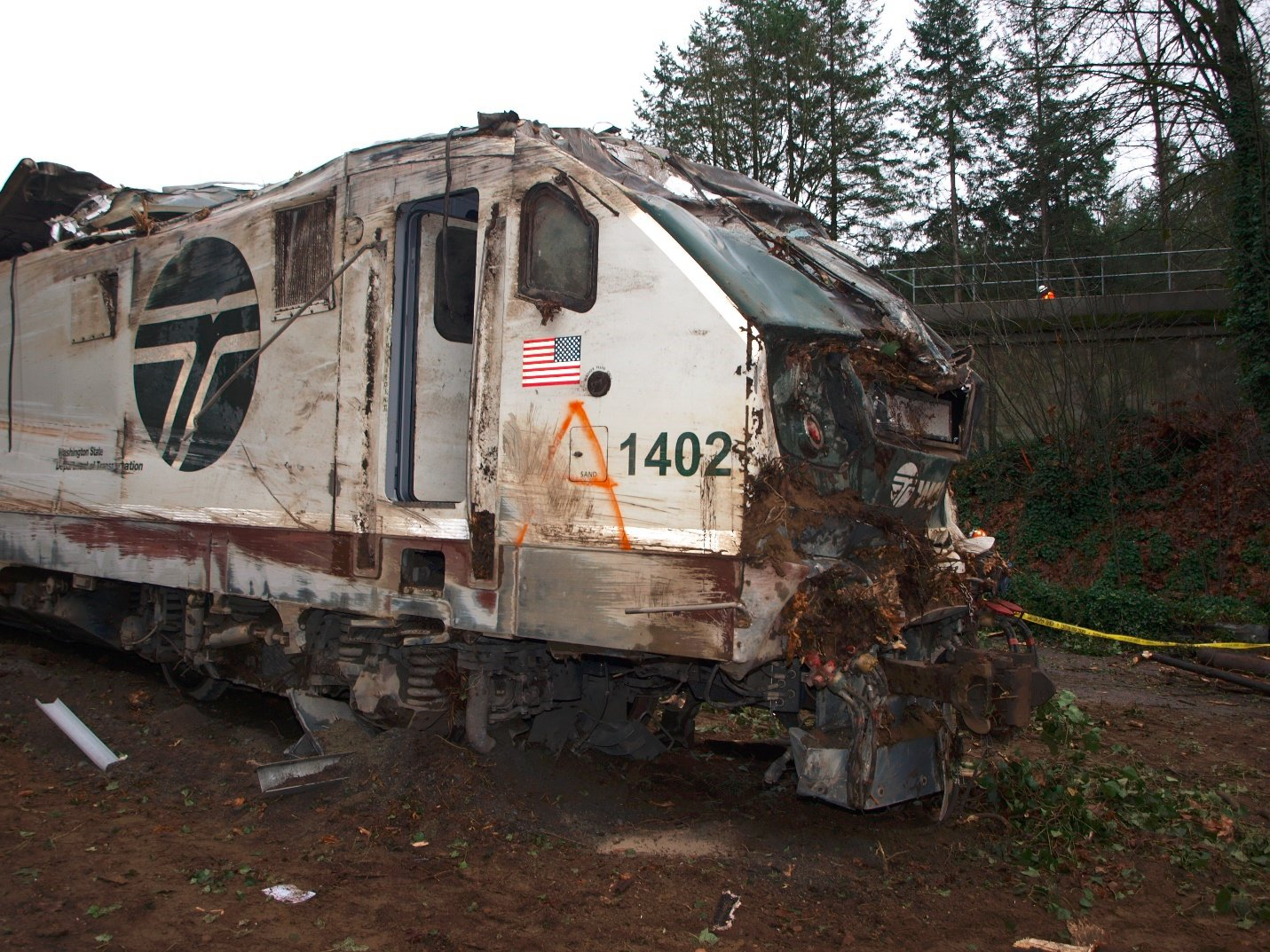
Damage to the locomotive after the crash.

Locomotive WDTX 1402 was damaged beyond repair and scrapped, while locomotive AMTK 181 was undamaged and returned to service. Mt. Adams, the WSDOT-owned Talgo Series VI passenger trainset, was also damaged beyond repair. The NTSB later said that the use of these trainsets should be discontinued "as soon as possible," because of their lack of crashworthiness and overaged safety straps used for assembly retention. This led WSDOT and Amtrak to retire and scrap the remaining Talgo VI trainsets. The sets will be replaced with new Siemens Venture train sets.

== Response ==
Within hours of the derailment, Governor Jay Inslee declared a state of emergency and activated the Washington Military Department's emergency operations center at Camp Murray, adjacent to JBLM, to coordinate the multi-agency response to the incident.

A civilian support and reunification center was set up at DuPont City Hall. The Bloodworks Northwest blood bank called for donors after the crash.

President Donald Trump said on Twitter a few hours after the accident that the derailment shows that his "soon to be submitted infrastructure plan must be passed quickly." He said "several trillion dollars" were spent in the Middle East while the transport infrastructure "crumble[s]". A second tweet said his "thoughts and prayers are with everyone", and he thanked first responders. The Associated Press and The New York Times reports of Trump's tweets said the accident had occurred on newly constructed track that was part of a recently upgraded line. The New York Times added that this project was part of the American Recovery and Reinvestment Act of 2009, an act signed by President Barack Obama that aimed to address infrastructure shortfalls.

The New York Times editorial board said that the derailment is symptomatic of the federal government's failure to invest in infrastructure. It said that despite Trump seemingly acknowledging the problem, his administration's $630 million budget cuts to Amtrak, and a proposed plan to shift infrastructure costs down to state and local governments, would only serve to aggravate the problem.

Amtrak fired the train's engineer, Steven J. Brown, for violating safety rules; however, Brown subsequently filed suit against Amtrak for his injuries, with Amtrak settling his claims. (See, Litigation, below.)

== Investigation ==
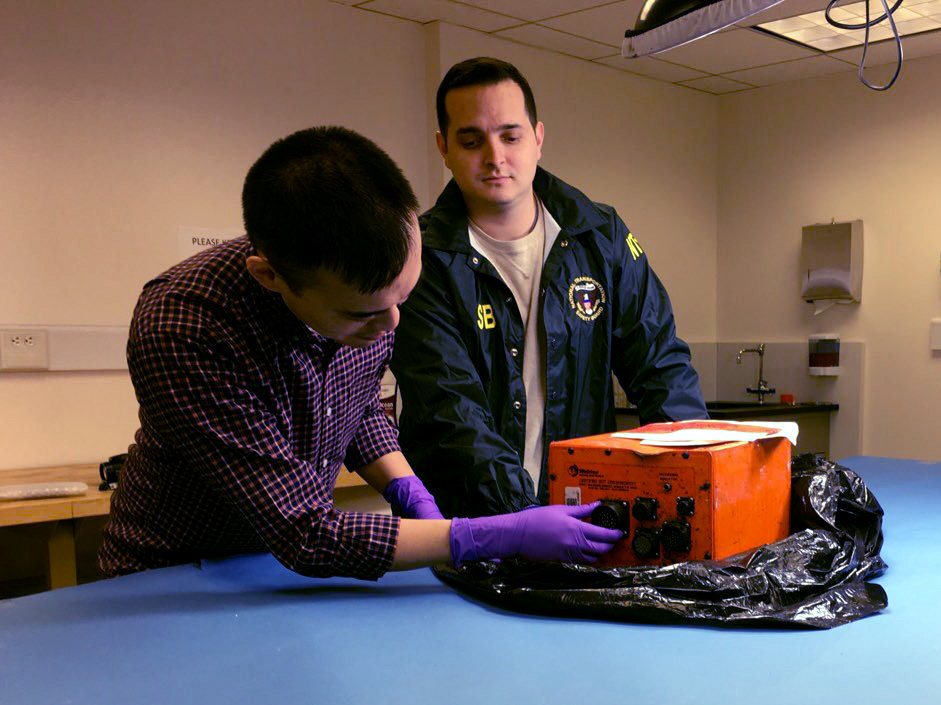
NTSB engineers examine the lead locomotive event recorder two days after the derailment

The National Transportation Safety Board (NTSB) opened an investigation into the accident and dispatched a 20-member Go Team to the crash site. The NTSB said its investigators would be on-site for seven to ten days. One aspect of the investigation was whether the engineer lost situational awareness.

The NTSB said the train was traveling at 80 mph (130 km/h) at a point soon before it derailed. The speed limit on the curved track segment where the derailment occurred is 30 mph (48 km/h), but the preceding track segment north of Mounts Road has a limit of 79 mph (127 km/h). The NTSB reported that the train data recorders had been recovered from both locomotives. The lead locomotive recorder showed that the engineer had commented on the train's excessive speed six seconds before the derailment, and applied the brakes. The lead locomotive was traveling at 78 mph (126 km/h) when recording stopped. A preliminary report into the accident was published on January 4, 2018, and the final report was published on May 21, 2019.

The NTSB found that the crew was attentive and not distracted by conversation or cellular telephones. At the time of accident, there was slight precipitation and it was generally dark outside. Although the engineer knew about the 30 mph (48 km/h) curve ahead, he had missed the single sign that he was going to use as a signal to start slowing down; he also missed two other signs, but one was not used by Amtrak trains, and the other was before the sign he planned to use. Although he did not see the sign at the location where he planned to initiate braking, investigators noted that this sign was highly inconspicuous because it blended in with the signal box directly behind it. Because the engineer only had one operating trip in the dark traveling in the opposite direction, he had not established wayside landmarks to help him identify his location. Such external cues are typically developed by operating crews after they become familiar with their train's territory, and without the use of landmarks, the engineer did not recognize that he had passed signs. The line's positive train control (PTC) system was still being installed and tested at the time of the accident; had it been operational, it would have notified the engineer that he was approaching the speed restriction at the curve and would have automatically stopped the train if the engineer had not reduced the train's speed in time.

As the train approached the curve, the locomotive issued audible and visual overspeed alarms; these only indicated that the train was moving faster than the line's overall 80 mph (130 km/h) maximum speed and did not warn of the 30 mph (48 km/h) speed restriction at the curve as the PTC system would have done. The engineer was new to the Charger locomotive and had not operated it during the initial training period; further, during the qualification process, observation rides and operating time were not usually performed on the Charger, limiting opportunities to experience all elements of the controls, including the overspeed alarms.

Unfamiliar with the overspeed alarms and not practiced for the appropriate response, the engineer spent 20 seconds deciphering them. During this time he briefly looked outside, but misinterpreted a signal and returned his gaze to the control screens, finally recognizing that he had tripped the overspeed alarm. Distracted by the alarms, he was unaware that he was nearing the curve. By the time he recognized the meaning of the alarms and returned his attention outside, the train was only about 5 seconds away from the curve. He applied the train's brakes after seeing the final speed sign, immediately north of the curve.

The NTSB does not assign fault or blame for an accident or incident; however, it provided its determination of the probable cause of the derailment, deaths, and injuries, the NTSB stating:

The National Transportation Safety Board determines that the probable cause of the Amtrak 501 derailment was Central Puget Sound Regional Transit Authority's failure to provide an effective mitigation for the hazardous curve without positive train control in place, which allowed the Amtrak engineer to enter the 30-mph curve at too high of a speed due to his inadequate training on the territory and inadequate training on the newer equipment. Contributing to the accident was the Washington State Department of Transportation's decision to start revenue service without being assured that safety certification and verification had been completed to the level determined in the preliminary hazard assessment. Contributing to the severity of the accident was the Federal Railroad Administration's decision to permit railcars that did not meet regulatory strength requirements to be used in revenue passenger service, resulting in (1) the loss of survivable space and (2) the failed articulated railcar-to-railcar connections that enabled secondary collisions with the surrounding environment causing severe damage to railcar-body structures which then failed to provide occupant protection resulting in passenger ejections, injuries, and fatalities.

== Litigation ==
More than 35 people sued Amtrak for damages resulting from the derailment. As of April 2022, Amtrak had paid more than $45 million in damages for derailment related injuries.

In January 2020, Steven Brown—the train's engineer—filed a personal injury lawsuit against Amtrak, claiming that the company failed to properly train him as the engineer to operate the train and to operate over the route, and that they failed to complete installation of Positive Train Control over the route. On March 24, 2021, a judge in Tacoma ruled that Amtrak was strictly liable for the claim of its engineer. By June 2022, Amtrak reached a settlement with Brown compensating him for pain and suffering related to the accident, his lawyer saying that Brown "would be taken care of for life".

== See also ==
- December 2013 Spuyten Duyvil derailment, commuter train that took a curve at far above its posted speed limit
- List of accidents on Amtrak
- List of American railroad accidents
- List of rail accidents (2010–2019)
- Transportation safety in the United States
