= Level crossing =

Intersection where a road crosses a railway at the same level

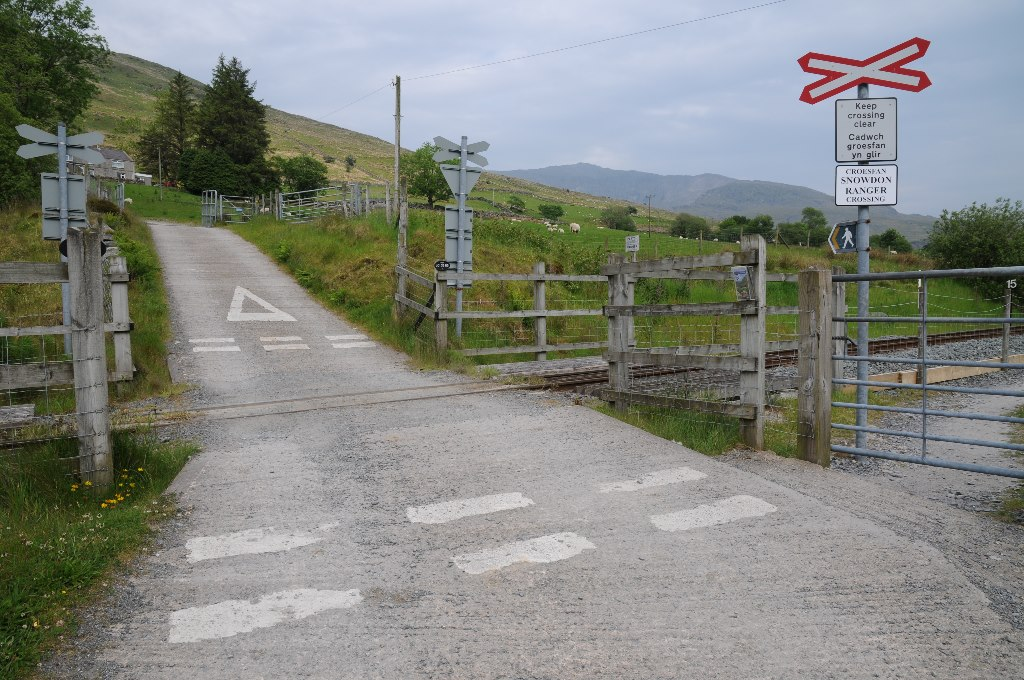
Many level crossings, especially those with no barriers such as this one in Wales, are marked by crossed beams (US: crossbucks) to warn road users

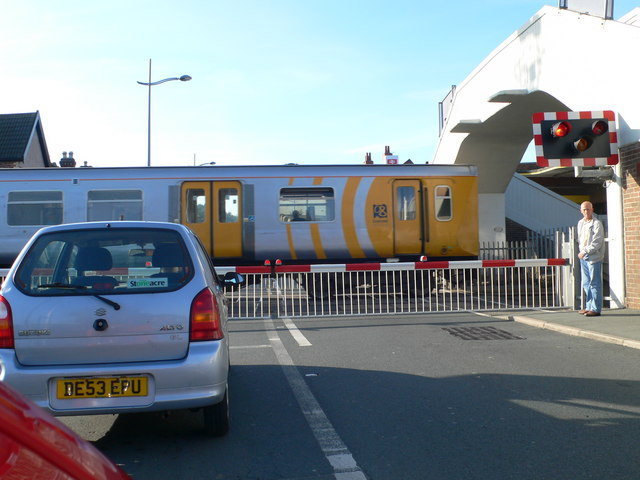
A level crossing at Hoylake, Merseyside, England, with a train passing

A level crossing is an intersection where a railway line crosses a road, path, or (in rare situations) airport runway, at the same level, as opposed to the crossing using an overpass or tunnel. The term also applies when a light rail line with separate right-of-way or reserved track crosses a road in the same fashion. Other names include railway level crossing, railway crossing (chiefly Australian; Canadian; and New Zealander), grade crossing/railroad crossing (chiefly American), railroad xing (Philippines), road through railroad, criss-cross, train crossing, and RXR.

There are more than 100,000 level crossings in Europe and more than 200,000 in North America.

Road-grade crossings are considered incompatible with high-speed rail and are virtually non-existent in European high-speed train operations.

== History ==
The types of early level crossings varied by location, but often they had a flagman in a nearby booth who, on the approach of a train, would wave a red flag or lantern to stop all traffic and clear the tracks. This was a dangerous job that cost the lives of gatekeepers or their family members, as the train was not given enough time to stop.

Barriers descending at an active level crossing in Japan, 2022

Gated crossings became commonplace in many areas, as they protected the railway from people trespassing and livestock, and they protected the users of the crossing when closed by the signalman/gateman. In the second quarter of the 20th century, manual or electrical closable gates that barricaded the roadway started to be introduced, intended to be a complete barrier against intrusion of any road traffic onto the railway. Automatic crossings are now commonplace in some countries as motor vehicles replaced horse-drawn vehicles and the need for animal protection diminished with time. Full-, half- or no-barrier crossings superseded gated crossings, although crossings of older types can still be found in places. In rural regions with sparse traffic, the least expensive type of level crossing to operate is one without flagmen or gates, with only a warning sign posted. This type has been common across North America and in many developing countries.

Some international rules have helped to harmonise level crossing. For instance, the 1968 Vienna Convention states (chapter 3, article 23b) that:

- "one or two blinking red light indicates a car should stop; if they are yellow the car can pass with caution".
- Article 27 suggests stop lines at level crossings.
- Article 33, 34, 35 and 36 are specific to level crossings, because level crossings are recognized as dangerous.
- Article 35 indicates a cross should exist when there is no barrier or lights.

This has been implemented in many countries, including countries which are not part of the Vienna Convention.

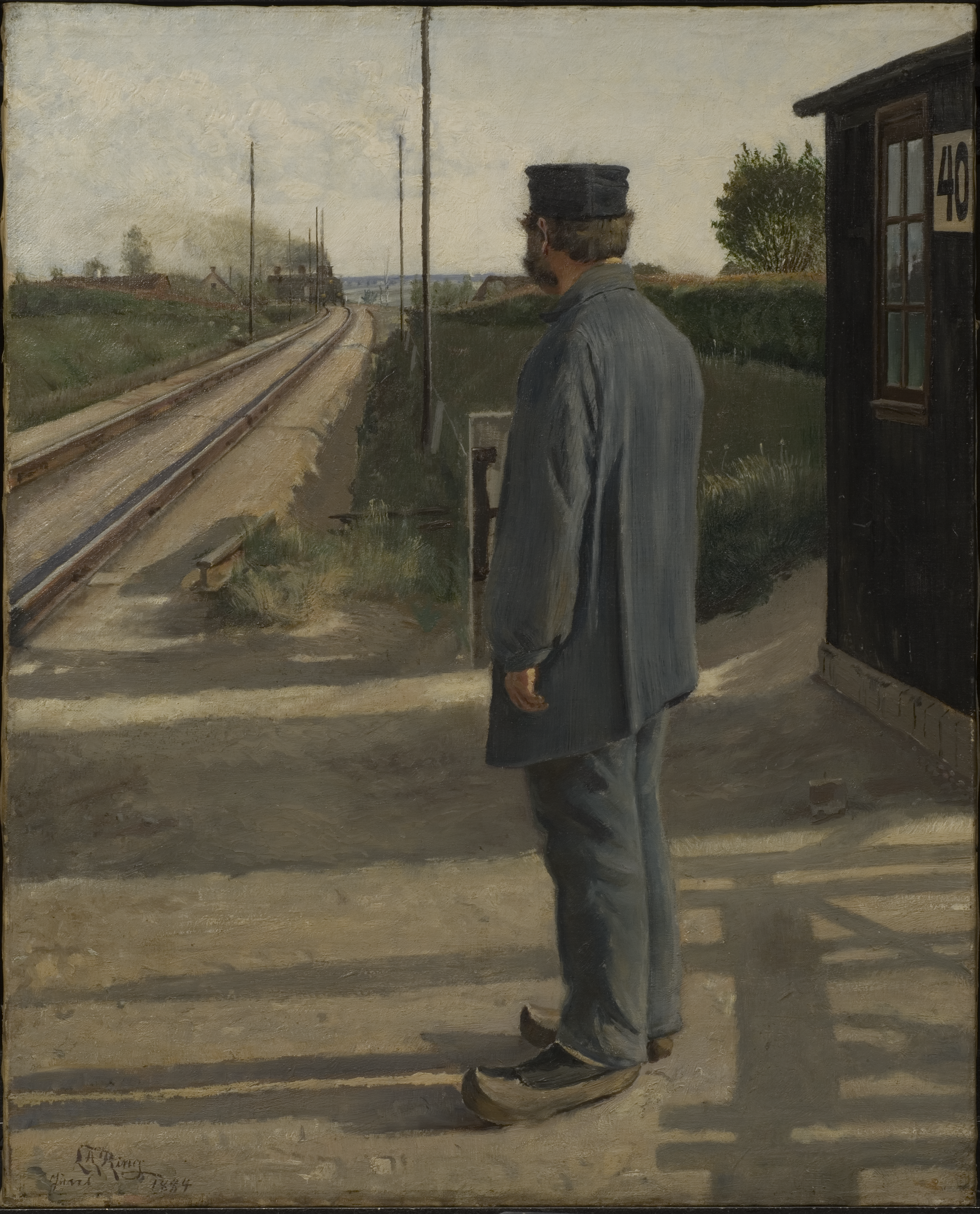
A gateman at work at a gated crossing of the South Line in Denmark.
Painting by L. A. Ring, 1884.

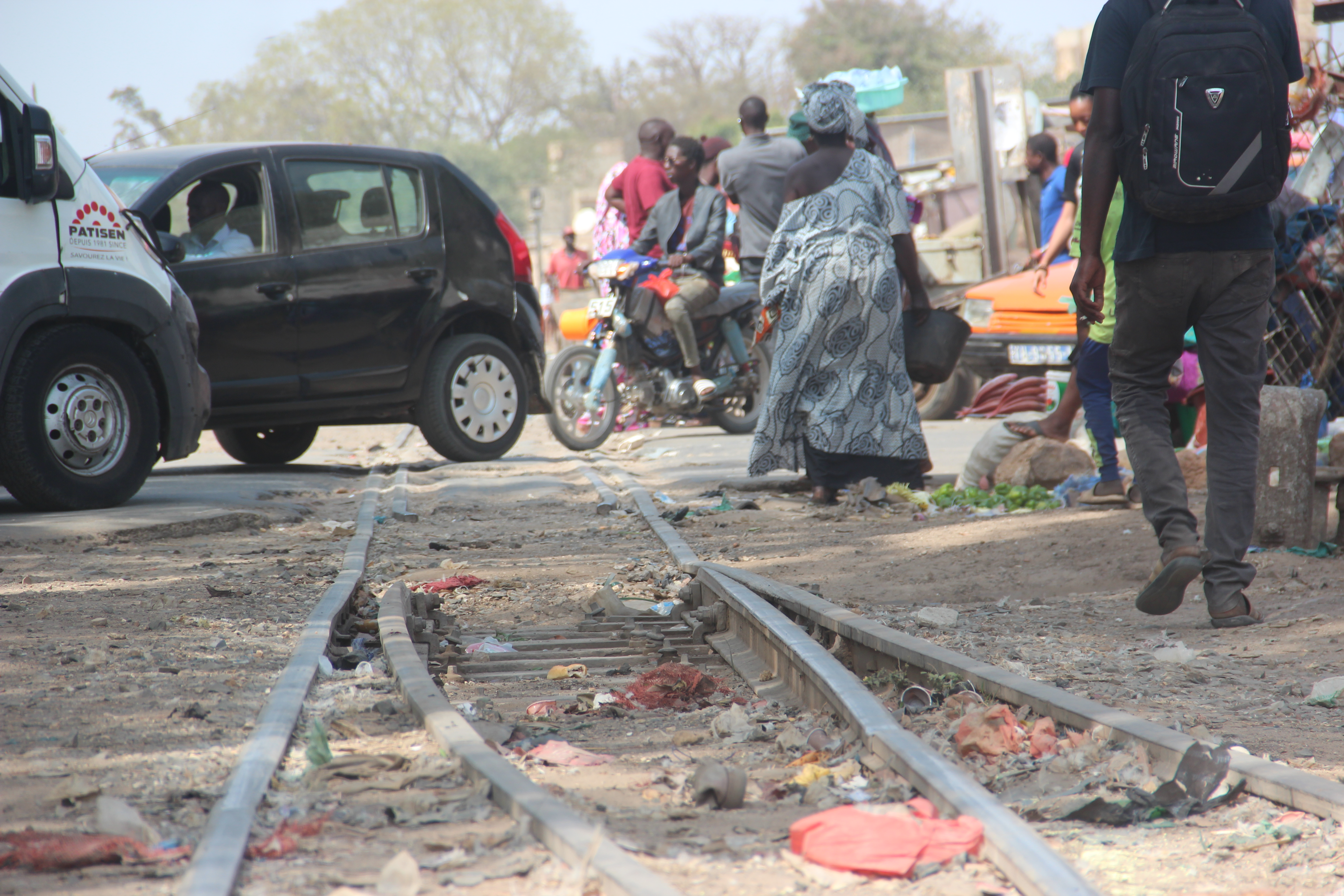
Level crossing in Senegal (2020)

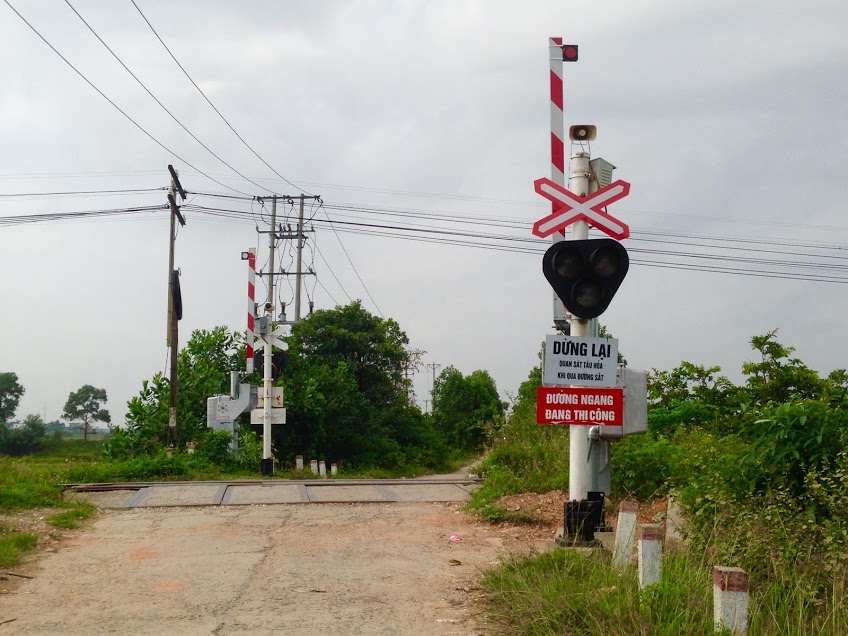
A level crossing at Hanoi, Vietnam, with crossing lights, electric bells, and half-barrier gates in their open position

== Safety ==
Trains have a much larger mass relative to their braking capability, and thus a far longer braking distance than road vehicles. With rare exceptions, trains do not stop at level crossings but rely on road vehicles and pedestrians to clear the tracks in advance. There have been several accidents in which a heavy load on a slow road transporter has not cleared the line in time, such as the Hixon rail crash.

Level crossings constitute a significant safety concern internationally. On average, each year around 400 people in the European Union and over 300 in the United States are killed in level crossing accidents. Collisions can occur with vehicles as well as pedestrians; pedestrian collisions are more likely to result in a fatality. Among pedestrians, young people (5–19 years), older people (60 years and over), and males are considered to be higher risk users. On some commuter lines most trains may slow to stop at a station, but express or freight trains will pass through stations at high speed without slowing.

As far as warning systems for road users are concerned, level crossings either have "passive" protection, in the form of various types of warning signs, or "active" protection, using automatic warning devices such as flashing lights, warning sounds, and barriers or gates. In the 19th century and for much of the 20th, a sign warning "Stop, look, and listen" (or similar wording) was the sole protection at most level crossings. Fewer collisions take place at level crossings with active warning systems, and active protection is widely available. Modern radar sensor systems can detect if level crossings are free of obstructions as trains approach. These improve safety by not lowering crossing barriers that may trap vehicles or pedestrians on the tracks, while signalling trains to brake until the obstruction clears. However, they cannot prevent a vehicle from moving out onto the track once it is far too late for the locomotive to slow even slightly.

Due to the increase in road and rail traffic as well as for safety reasons, level crossings are increasingly being removed. As an example, Melbourne is as of 2024, planning to close 110 level crossings by 2030 and (due to the proximity of some stations) rebuild 51 stations.

At railway stations, a pedestrian level crossing is sometimes provided to allow passengers to reach other platforms in the absence of an underpass or bridge, or for disabled access. Where third rail systems have level crossings, there is a gap in the third rail over the level crossing, but this does not necessarily interrupt the power supply to trains since they may have current collectors on multiple cars.

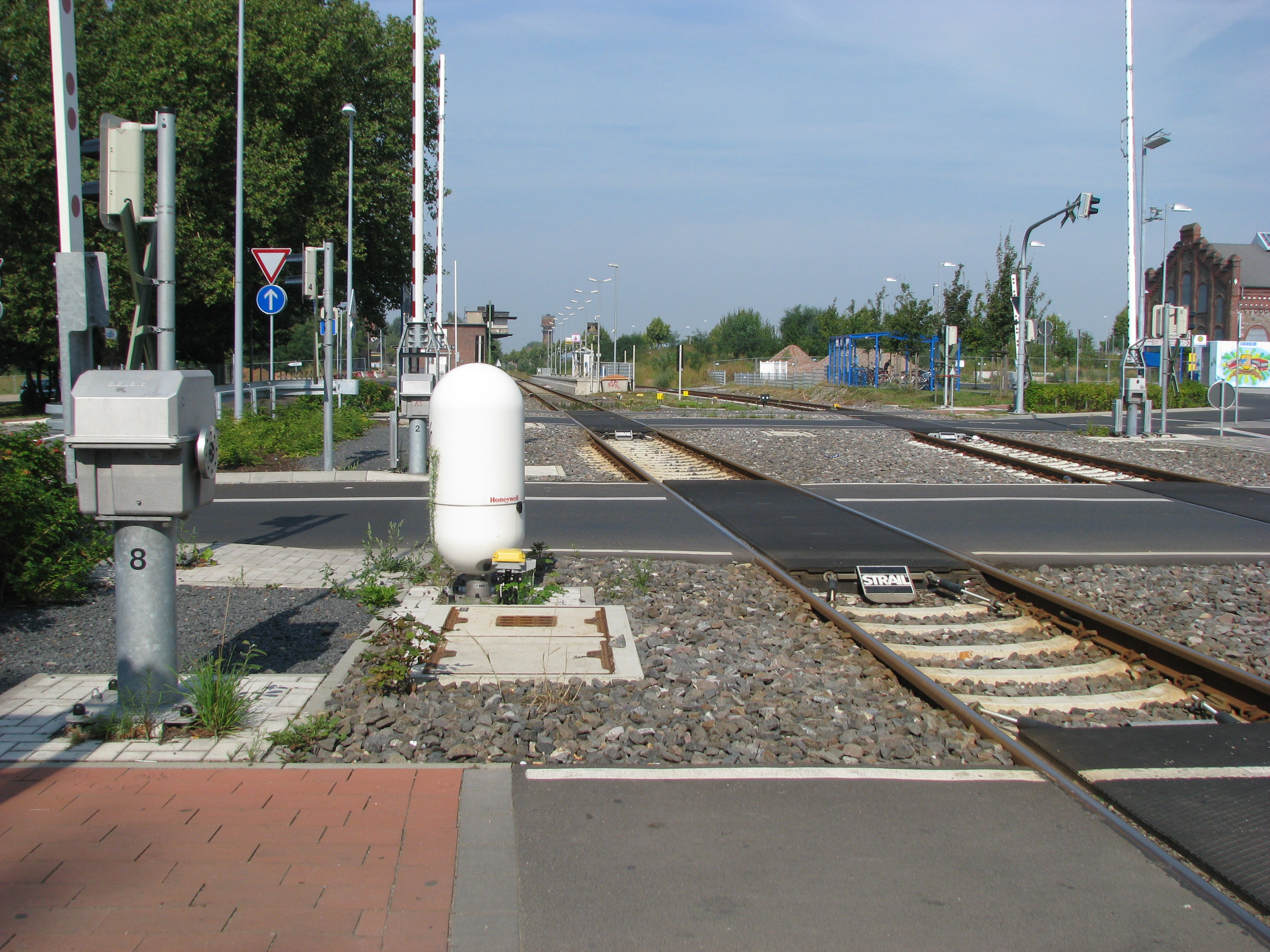
Level crossing in Germany with an egg-shaped radar sensor for detecting obstacles on the crossing

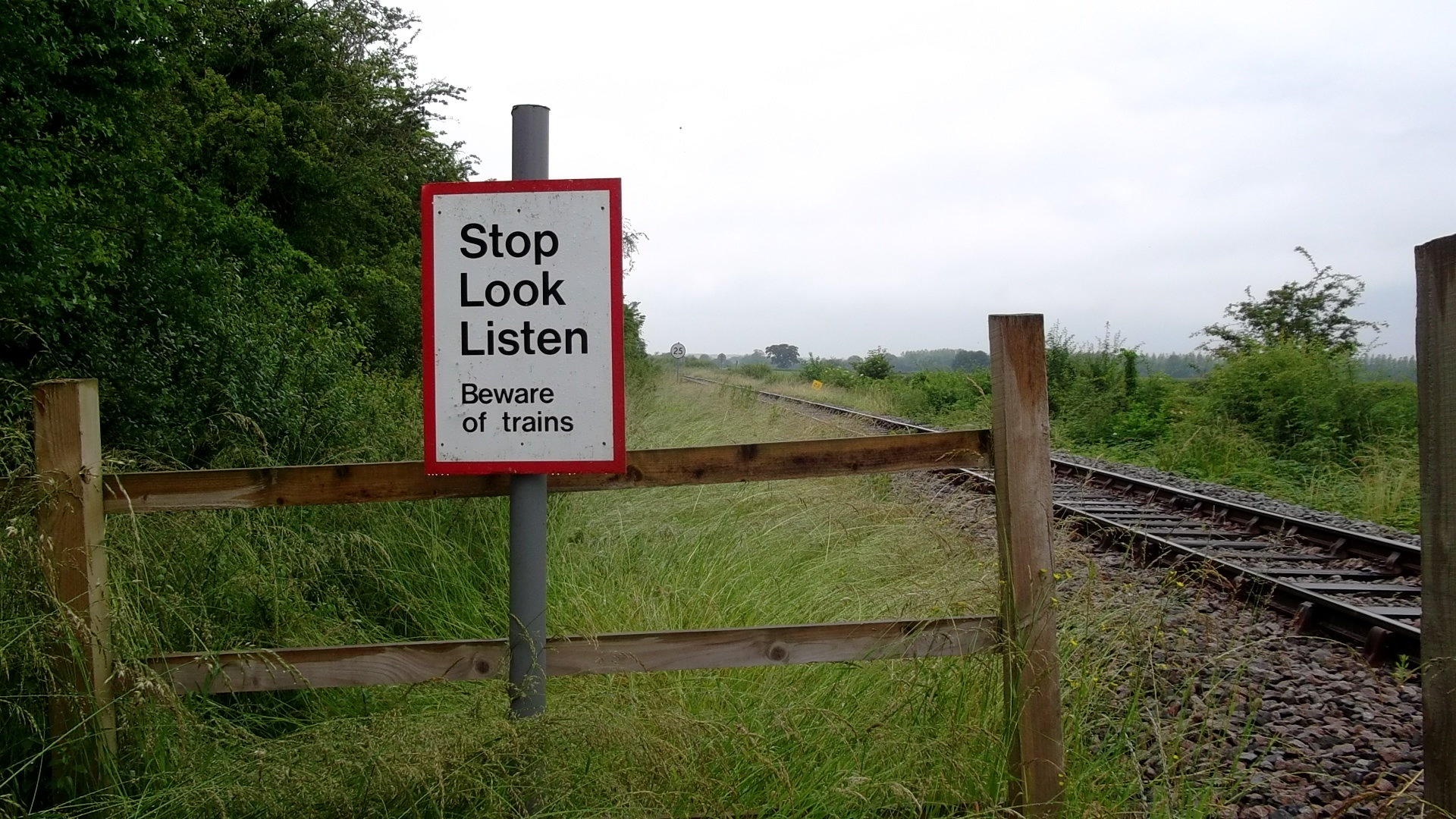
A "stop, look, and listen" sign in Britain

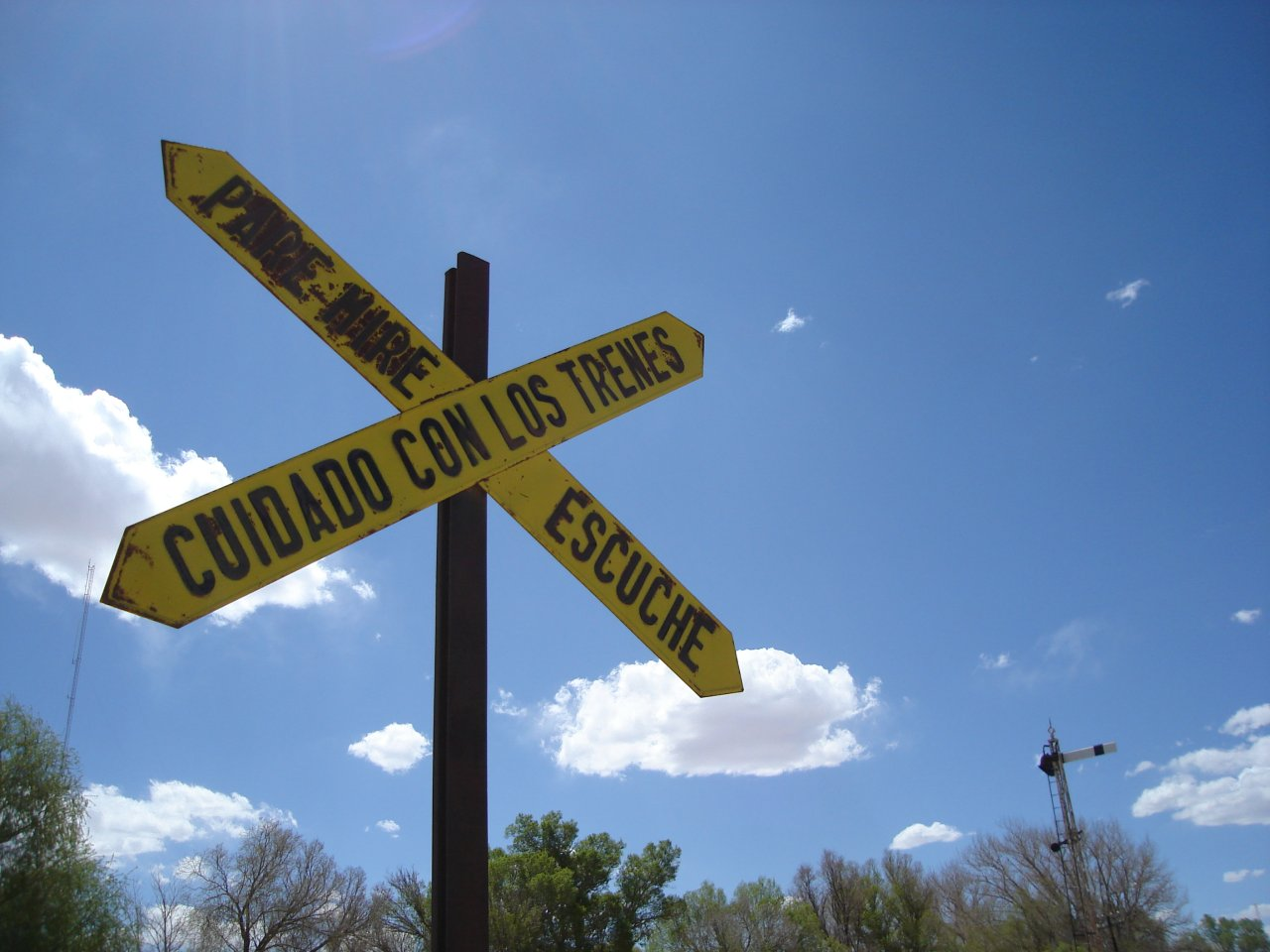
A "stop, look, and listen" sign in Argentina

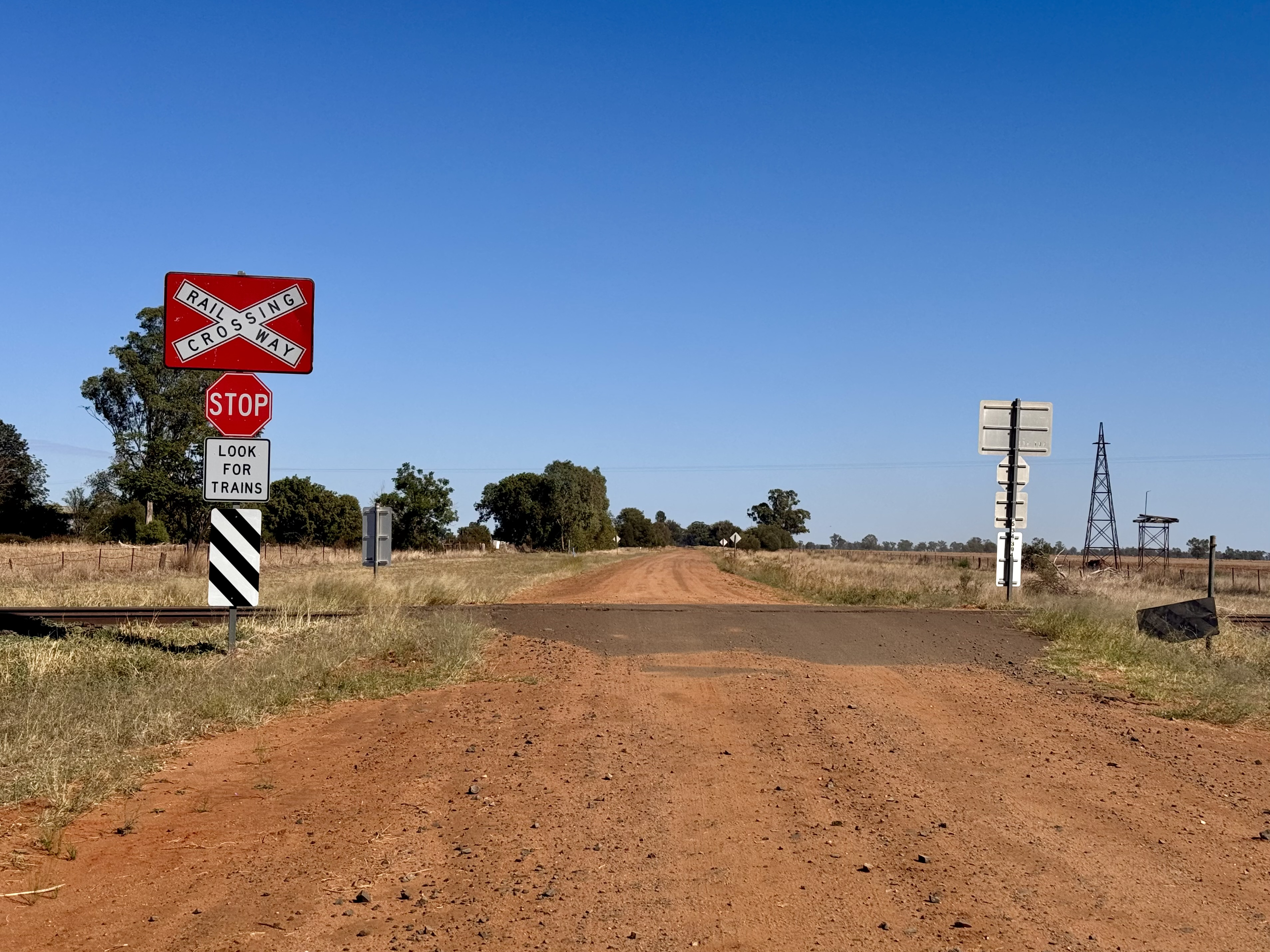
A passively-protected level crossing in Australia
Source: US Department of Transportation. View source data.
Source: Eurostat: The rail accident data are provided to Eurostat by the European Railway Agency (ERA). The ERA manages and is responsible for the entire data collection. The Eurostat data constitute a part of the data collected by ERA and are part of the common safety indicators (CSIs). Since 2010, use of national definitions is no longer permitted: 2010 CSI data represent the first fully harmonized set of figures. View source data.
* Source: Eurostat: Annual number of victims by type of accident [rail_ac_catvict] Last update: 9 February 2017 View source data.
* Source, Federal Railroad Administration View source data.

== Traffic signal preemption ==
Traffic signal-controlled intersections next to level crossings on at least one of the roads in the intersection usually feature traffic signal preemption. In the US, approaching trains activate a routine where, before the road lights and barriers are activated, all traffic signal phases go to red, except for the signal immediately after the crossing, which turns green (or flashing yellow) to allow traffic on the tracks to clear (in some cases, there are auxiliary traffic signals prior to the railroad crossing which will turn red, keeping new traffic from crossing the tracks. This is in addition to the flashing lights on the crossing barriers). After enough time to clear the crossing, the signal turns back to red, staying red for the duration of the train's passing. The crossing lights may begin flashing and the barriers lower immediately, or this might be delayed until after the traffic light turns red.

The operation of a traffic signal, while a train is present, may differ from municipality to municipality. There are a number of possible arrangements:

1. All directions will flash red, turning the intersection into an all-way stop.
2. While the train is passing, the traffic parallel to the railroad track will have a flashing yellow, while the other directions face a flashing red light.
3. While the train is passing, the traffic parallel to the railroad track will have a green light, while the other directions face a red light.
4. Traffic lights can operate relatively normally, with only the blocked direction turning red while the train is passing.

== Crossing cameras ==
In France, cameras have been installed on some level crossings to obtain images to improve understanding of an incident when a technical investigation occurs.

In England, cameras have been installed at some level crossings.

In South Australia, cameras have been installed at some level crossings to deter non-compliance with signals.

== By country ==
Designs of level crossings vary between countries.

== Major accidents ==
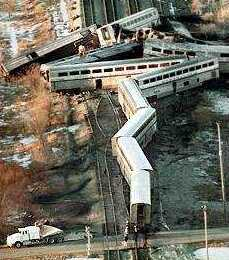
The 1999 Bourbonnais, Illinois (US) train accident was attributed to a malfunction of the crossing's warning signals, with fatigue of the driver of a semi truck as a contributing factor.

Level crossings present a significant risk of collisions between trains and road vehicles. This list is not a definitive list of the world's worst accidents and the events listed are limited to those where a separate article describes the event in question.

Accident	Deaths	Country	Year	Ref.
Langenweddingen level crossing disaster	94	East Germany	1967	
Amritsar train disaster	62	India	2018	
Nagpur level crossing disaster	55	India	2005	
Manfalut train accident	51	Egypt	2012	
Marhanets train and bus collision	45	Ukraine	2010	
Villa Soldati level crossing tragedy	42	Argentina	1962	
Polgahawela level crossing accident	35	Sri Lanka	2005	
Dorion level crossing accident	19	Canada	1966	
Chipman-Lamont school bus-train collision	17	Canada	1960	
2009 Slovak coach and train collision	12	Slovakia	2009	
Flores rail crash	11	Argentina	2011	
Bourbonnais train accident	11	United States	1999	
Hixon rail crash	11	United Kingdom	1968	
Kerang rail accident	11	Australia	2007	
Glendale train crash	11	United States	2005	
Lockington rail crash	9	United Kingdom	1986	
Fox River Grove level crossing accident	7	United States	1995	
Ufton Nervet rail crash	7	United Kingdom	2004	
Ottawa bus–train crash	6	Canada	2013	
Valhalla train crash	6	United States	2015	
Gerogery level crossing accident	5	Australia	2001	
2022 Missouri train derailment	4	United States	2022	
2019 Westbury train collision	3	United States	2019	
Nosaby level crossing disaster	2	Sweden	2004	

== Runway crossings ==
Crossing of the A970 road over Sumburgh Airport's runway in Shetland. The movable barrier closes when aircraft land or take off.

The French sign warning of plane movements on or near the ground was changed in 1977 to comply with the Vienna convention.

Aircraft runways sometimes cross roads or rail lines, and require signaling to avoid collisions.

=== Australia ===
- Sydney Airport had a runway crossing, when that runway was extended. The Port Botany railway line was later deviated in March 1960 to release land for new Qantas hangars with sharp curves that avoided the runway. On 18 June 1950, a Douglas DC-3 operating for Ansett Australia was involved in a ground collision with a freight train at the crossing. The accident derailed several train cars, severely damaged the aircraft, and resulted in one minor injury to the aircraft crew.
- Burnie Airport had a runway crossing over the 05/23 Runway. This crossing was built over the railway line when the airfield was constructed, and has since been decommissioned with the closing of both the railway line and the 05/23 runway.

=== Gibraltar ===
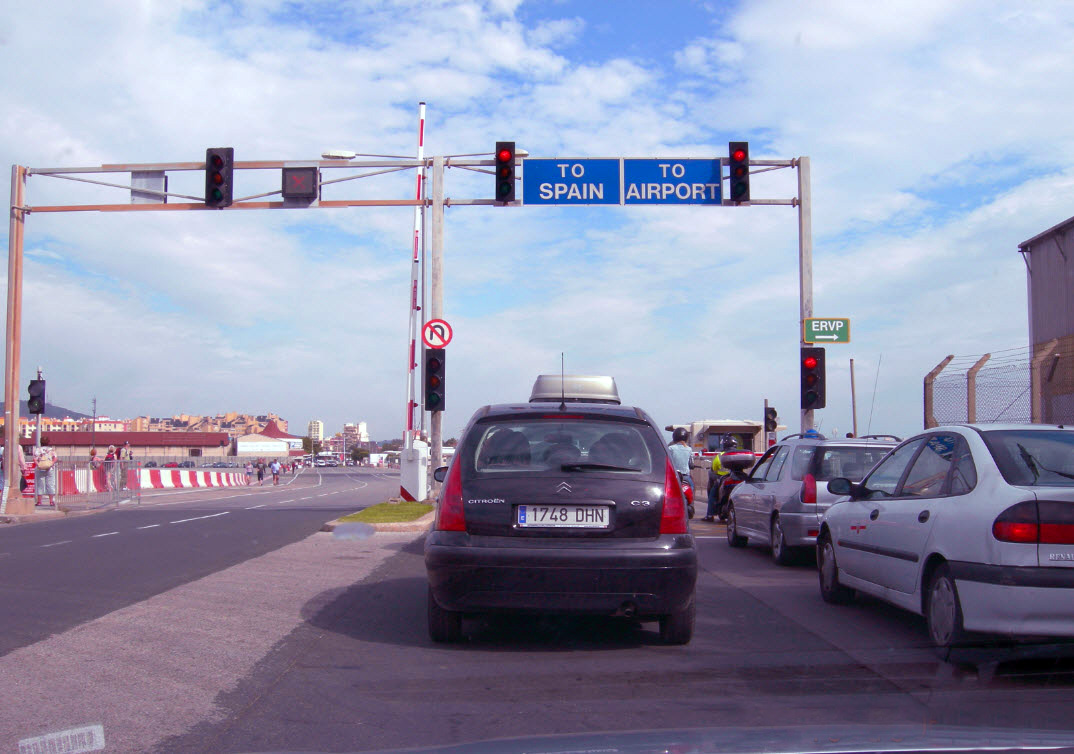
Intersection in the British Overseas Territory of Gibraltar

Winston Churchill Avenue intersects the runway of Gibraltar International Airport at surface level; movable barricades close when aircraft land or take off.

As of March 2023, a tunnel under the runway opened to regular traffic, and the level crossing will only be available to pedestrians, cyclists and e-scooters.

=== Hong Kong ===
After the runway of Kai Tak Airport was extended in 1943, it intersected with the easternmost section of Prince Edward Road, so all road traffic had to be stopped during takeoffs and landings. The issue was relieved when the authorities constructed a new runway for replacement in September 1958.

=== Madagascar ===
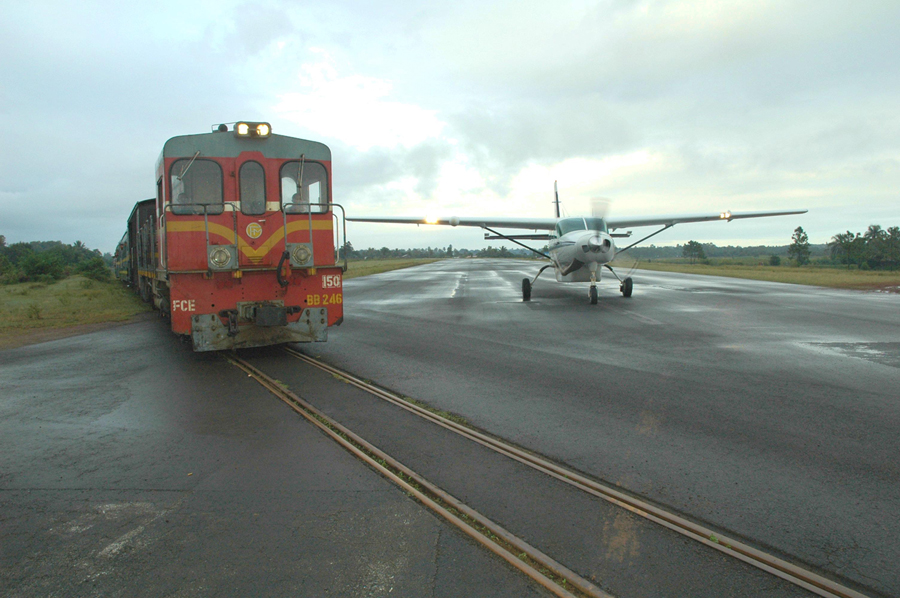
A train crosses the runway in Manakara, Madagascar.

The Fianarantsoa–Côte Est railway crosses the runway at Manakara Airport. It is one of the few airports in the world that crosses an active railway line.

=== New Zealand ===
A level crossing near Gisborne, sees the Palmerston North–Gisborne Line cross one of Gisborne Airport's runways. Aircraft landing on sealed 1310-metre runway 14L/32R are signalled with two red flashing lights on either side of the runway and a horizontal bar of flashing red lights to indicate the runway south of the railway line is closed, and may land only on the 866-metre (2,841 ft) section of the runway north of the railway line. When the full length of the runway is open, a vertical bar of green lights signal to the aircraft, with regular rail signals on either side of the runway indicating trains to stop.

=== Nicaragua ===
The runway of Ometepe Airport crosses the highway NIC-64.

=== Philippines ===
As of February 2023, there exists one road-runway crossing at Catarman Airport in Northern Samar.

=== Sweden ===
The Visby Lärbro Line between Visby and Lärbro crossed the runway of Visby Airport between 1956 and 1960.

=== Switzerland ===
Two public roads cross the runway at Meiringen Air Base. Electrically operated gates close when aircraft land or take off.

=== United Kingdom ===
- Northern Ireland: There was a runway crossing on the Belfast–Derry railway line. The runway was interlocked with conventional railway block instruments to the control tower.
- Scotland: Crossing of the A970 road over Sumburgh Airport's runway in Shetland.

== See also ==
- At-grade intersection
- At-grade railway
- Billups Neon Crossing Signal
- Boom barrier
- Breakover angle
- Crossbuck
- Four-quadrant gate
- Grade separation
- Level crossing signals
- Lists of rail accidents

- List of train accidents by death toll

- Lists of traffic collisions
- Occupation crossing
- Pedestrian crossing
- Warning sign
- Whistle post
- Wigwag
- Level crossings in the United Kingdom

== Bibliography ==
- Hall, Stanley; van der Mark, Peter (2008). Level Crossings. Shepperton: Ian Allan Publishing. ISBN 978-0-7110-3308-5.
