= 2018 Crozet, Virginia, train crash =

Level crossing accident in Virginia, United States

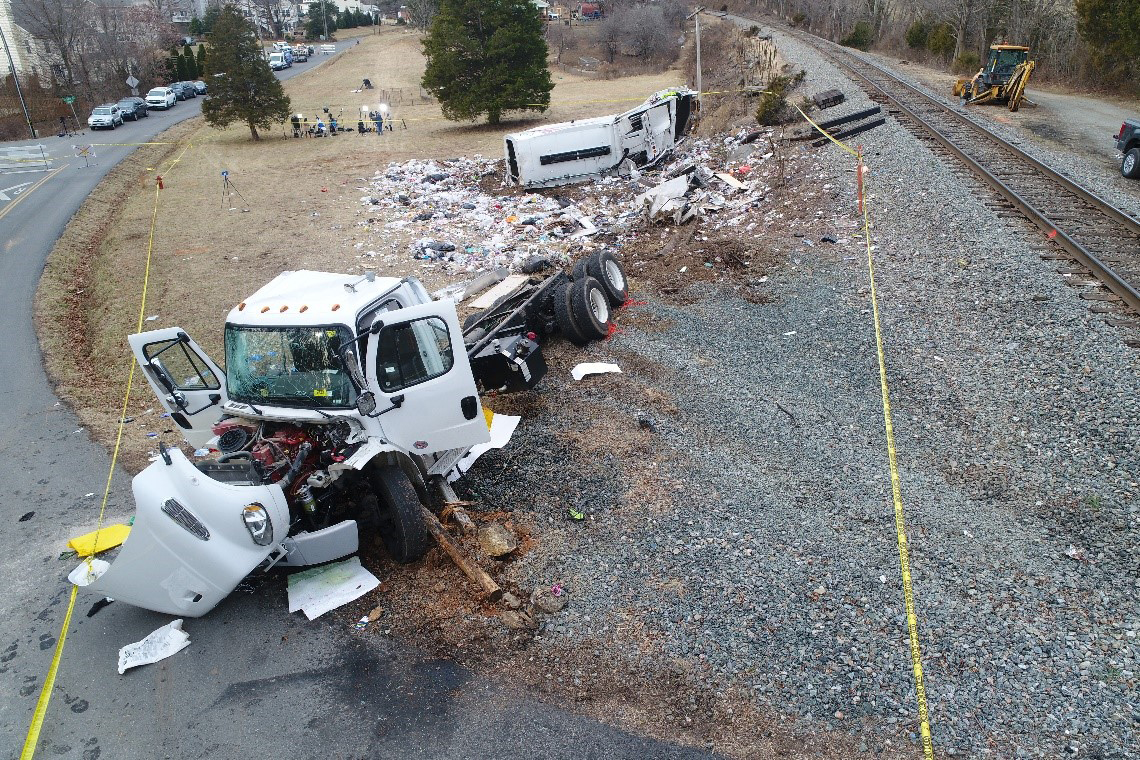
- Aftermath of the crash with the trash strewn about the accident site.

- Location within Virginia Location within the United States

Details
- Date: January 31, 2018; 8 years ago 11:16 a.m. EST
- Location: Crozet, Virginia
- Coordinates: 38.0773314°N 78.71675°W
- Country: United States
- Line: CSX Piedmont, Washington, North Mountain Subdivision (operated under a lease agreement by the Buckingham Branch Railroad)
- Operator: Amtrak
- Incident type: Level crossing collision
- Cause: Vehicle incursion

Statistics
- Vehicles: 1
- Passengers: more than 100 (2 on the truck)
- Crew: more than 10
- Deaths: 1
- Injured: 6

The Crozet, Virginia, train crash was a railway accident that occurred on January 31, 2018. A chartered Amtrak train named Congressional Special Train 923, following the route normally used by the Amtrak Cardinal and carrying a group of politicians and lawmakers from the Republican Party, collided with a garbage truck at a level crossing at Lanetown Road in Crozet, 12 miles (19 km) west of Charlottesville, Virginia, United States. The train was chartered by Republican lawmakers for transportation from Washington Union Station to an annual retreat at The Greenbrier in White Sulphur Springs, West Virginia. Several politicians brought their spouses and children with them for the trip; no members of the general public were passengers.

== Crash ==
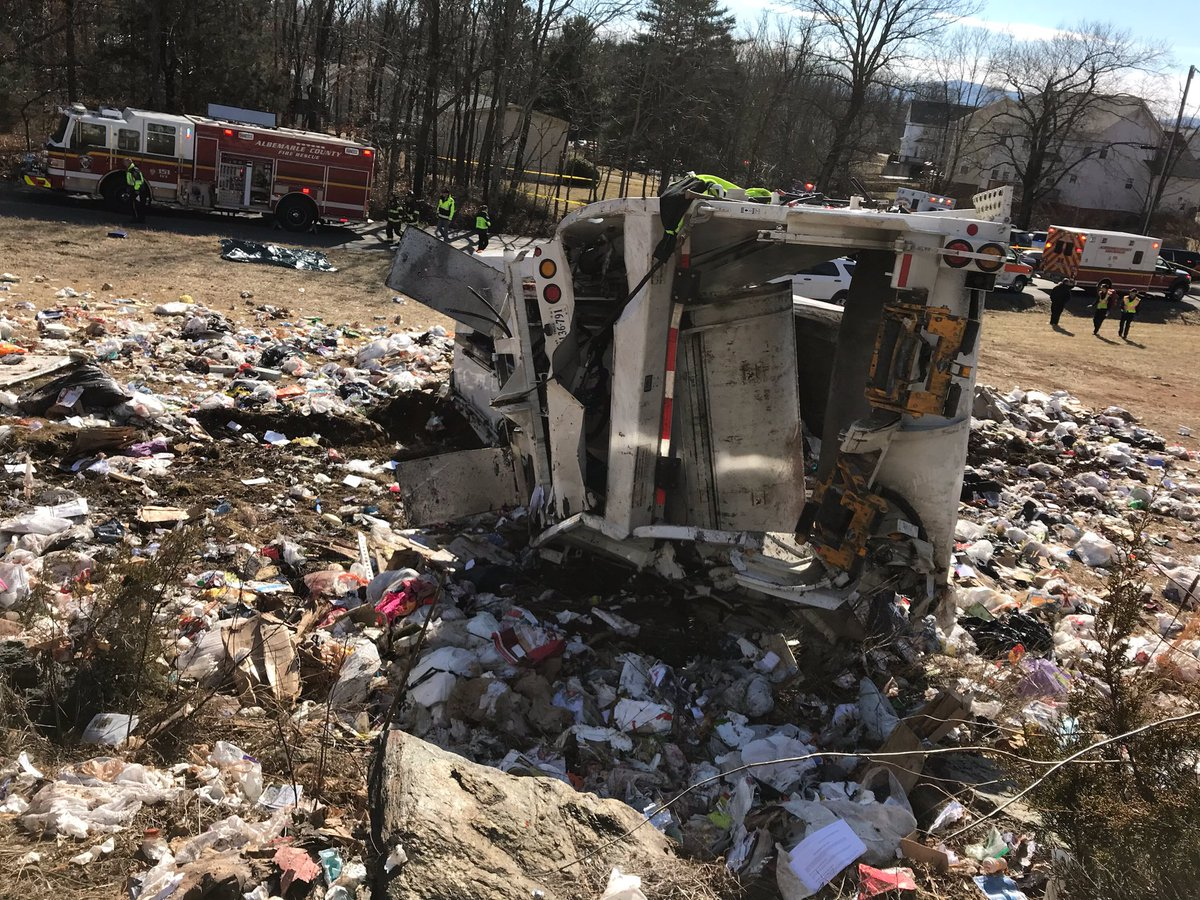
Photo of the scene taken by Oregon Rep. Greg Walden shortly after the crash, posted to Twitter

About 11:16 a.m. EST (16:16 UTC), Amtrak Congressional Special Train 923 struck the left rear of a garbage truck operated by Time Disposal at a railroad crossing at Lanetown Road near Crozet, Virginia. This caused the truck to rotate counterclockwise and collide with a railroad signal structure next to the tracks. The body of the garbage truck separated from the cab, and the truck's two passengers were ejected. The crossing is protected by flasher lights and gates, which were operating at the time of collision. According to a witness, the train sounded a prolonged warning with its horn as the truck was trying to cross the track. According to an Albemarle County Police Department statement, 28-year-old truck passenger Christopher Foley died; he had mistakenly been identified by some as the driver. Another passenger was airlifted in critical condition, and the truck driver was taken to the hospital in serious condition. Three train passengers and three Amtrak crewmembers reported minor injuries.

Several politicians on the train made statements on the scene to media outlets. Representative Thomas Massie of Kentucky described the incident as "...loud and surprising. Some minor bumps and bruises in this car. We saw debris go by the left side of the train. The part of the truck we can see was decimated. Very relieved when the train came to a stop and still on the tracks."

Six injured people were taken to the University of Virginia Medical Center in Charlottesville. The hospital reported that one of the injured was in critical condition. One member of Congress, Representative Jason Lewis of Minnesota, was taken to the hospital with a concussion. He was treated and released, rejoining the group at the retreat in the early evening. Representative Roger Marshall, M.D., of Kansas, a passenger on the train, administered first aid and CPR to the injured, as did other passengers and local residents with medical training.

At 1:15 p.m. EST, the partially derailed lead locomotive, Amtrak P42DC heritage unit #145, was removed from the train to allow the investigation to continue. The remainder of the train was then moved back to Charlottesville Union Station by P42DC #4, where the passengers were transferred to waiting buses to continue their trip to the Greenbrier. #145 was repaired and put back into service following the incident.

== Investigation and criminal charges ==
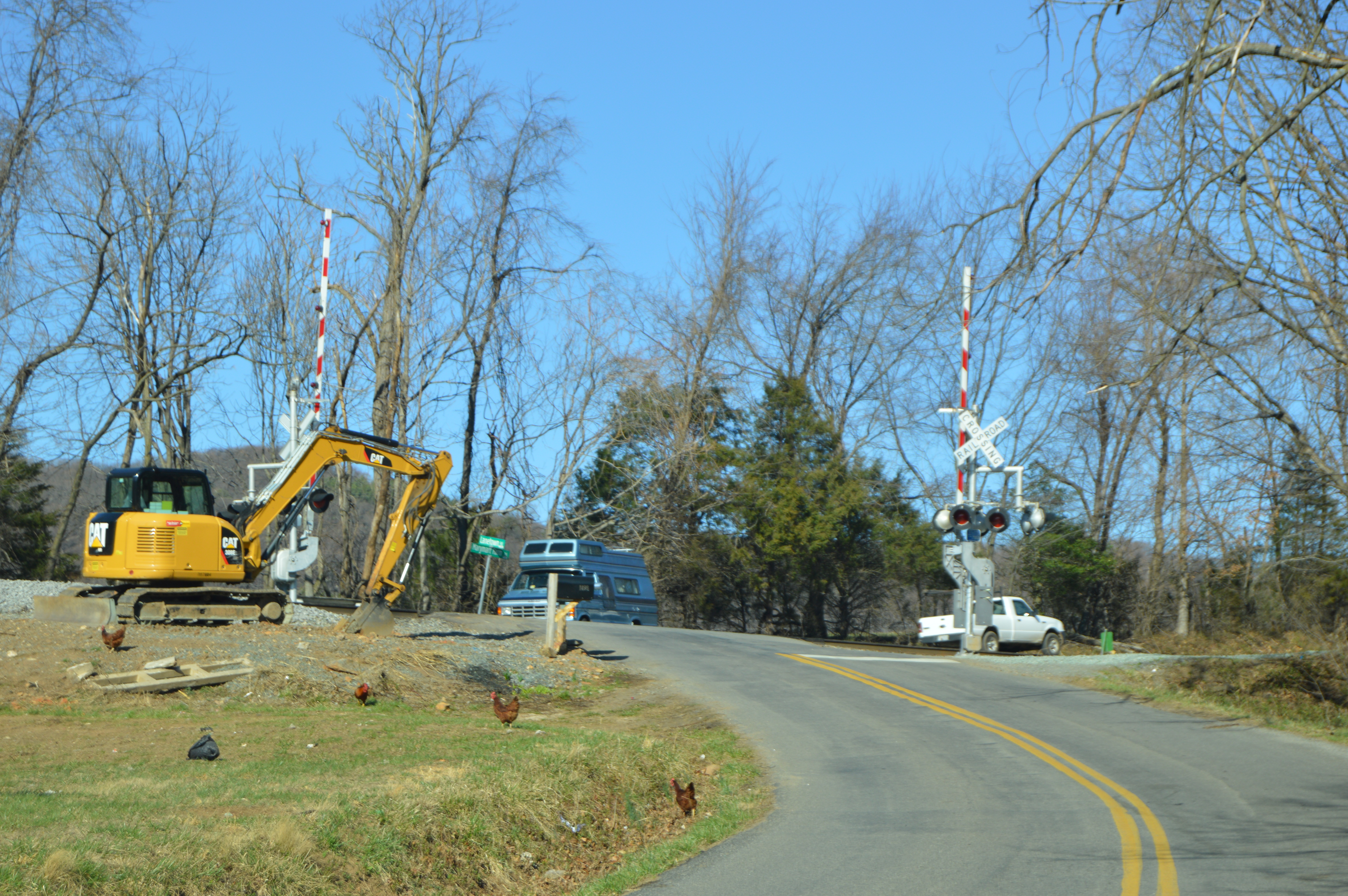
Post-accident scene at the site

The crash was investigated by multiple agencies, with the National Transportation Safety Board (NTSB) serving as the lead investigative agency. The Federal Railroad Administration, Federal Bureau of Investigation, Albemarle County Police Department, Amtrak and the Buckingham Branch Railroad, who operates the rail line for CSX Transportation, assisted the NTSB in the investigation.

On February 21, 2018, the NTSB published a preliminary report on the accident. It said the train was traveling about 61 miles per hour (98 km/h) when the engineer engaged the emergency brakes. Witnesses said the gates were already down when the truck entered the crossing. According to the lead locomotive's front-facing camera, by the time the crossing came into view, the truck was already inside the crossing.

After completing their investigation, the Albemarle County Police Department announced on June 8, 2018, that the driver of the garbage truck, Dana William Naylor Jr., had been indicted by an Albemarle County grand jury on one count of involuntary manslaughter for the death of truck passenger Christopher Foley. Naylor was also charged with one count of maiming while driving under the influence for causing permanent physical injury to Dennis Eddy, who was also a passenger in the truck. The substance that Naylor was accused of being under the influence of was not named in the announcement, although the NTSB later revealed that he had marijuana and anti-seizure medication in his blood. Naylor was ultimately acquitted on both the DUI maiming and involuntary manslaughter charges in February 2019.
