= 1999 Bourbonnais, Illinois, train crash =

1999 fatal train crash in Bourbonnais, Illinois, United States

1999 Bourbonnais, Illinois train crash
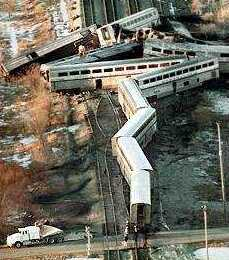
- Photo of the wreck

Details
- Date: March 15, 1999; 27 years ago 9:47 pm
- Location: Bourbonnais, Illinois
- Coordinates: 41°11′04.9″N 87°51′11.8″W
- Country: United States
- Operator: Amtrak
- Incident type: Level crossing collision
- Cause: Vehicle incursion

Statistics
- Trains: 1
- Deaths: 11
- Injured: 122

On March 15, 1999, Amtrak's southbound City of New Orleans passenger train collided with a semi-trailer truck in the village of Bourbonnais, Illinois, United States. Most of the train derailed, killing eleven people. A National Transportation Safety Board (NTSB) investigation into the accident attributed the cause to the truck driver trying to beat the train across a grade crossing. The NTSB's recommendations from the accident included increased enforcement of grade crossing signals, the installation of train event recorders at all new or improved grade crossings, and procedures to provide emergency responders with accurate lists of all crew members and passengers aboard trains. The city of Bourbonnais erected a memorial near the site to commemorate those killed in the accident.

== Crash ==
At approximately 9:45 p.m. central (local) time on March 15, 1999, Amtrak's City of New Orleans number 59 was operating southbound through Bourbonnais, Illinois, on tracks owned by the Illinois Central Railroad, which folded into the Canadian National Railway in July of that year. It was being pulled by two GE P40DC locomotives, #807 leading and #829 trailing. There were 207 passengers and 21 crew members on board at the time of the crash.

While operating through Bourbonnais, the Amtrak engineer observed a semi-trailer truck loaded with steel slowly crossing the tracks at a grade crossing. When the engineer realized the truck was not going to clear the tracks in time, he initiated an emergency brake application. However, the train was traveling at 79 mph (127 km/h) and was unable to stop in time.

Both locomotives and 11 of the train's 14 cars derailed, the derailed cars striking stationary freight cars on an adjacent siding. Eleven people aboard the train were killed and another 121 were transported to nearby hospitals with serious injuries. The driver of the semi-truck, John R. Stokes, was also injured. The collision resulted in more than US$14 million in damages.

== Investigations ==
=== NTSB investigation ===
The NTSB attributed the cause of the wreck to Stokes's reaction to the grade crossing signals. Thinking he could beat the train across the tracks, Stokes chose to proceed onto the tracks in front of the train. Stokes reported that the crossing signal did not activate until his vehicle was "right on top of the track," but he also stated that he did not want to brake quickly to avoid a shifting load that could hit the back of the truck's cab. Witnesses stated that the gates came down after the truck had entered the grade crossing. One witness stated that the gate clipped the truck's trailer and that part of the gate may have broken off as a result. The accident's fatalities were found in the third car from the engines, sleeper car 32035, due to warping of the coach, a piece of running rail piercing it, and fire damage.

As a result of the accident, the NTSB made several recommendations:

- To the highway maintainers:
  - Review the effectiveness of current railroad grade crossing signals and the use of traffic division islands in deterring motorists from driving around crossing gates.
- To the United States Secretary of Transportation:
  - Provide further grants and incentives to increase enforcement of grade crossing signals.
- To the United States Federal Railroad Administration:
  - Require the installation of event recorders to monitor gate position at new or improved grade crossings.
- To the railroads:
  - Initiate procedures to get accurate passenger and crew lists to emergency responders.
  - Implement improved crew accountability procedures on reserved passenger trains.
  - Install event recorders on all new or improved grade crossings.

=== Local civil and criminal investigations ===
The accident was also investigated by Illinois state and local agencies. Stokes had been convicted of numerous traffic violations in the past, and his trucking company, Melco Transfer Inc., had been cited for safety violations. Although the NTSB's investigation placed the fault of the collision on Stokes and his failure to yield at the grade crossing, the Illinois State Police concluded that the crossing lights were flashing, as expected, but the crossing gates were not functioning correctly and failed to be lowered until Stokes had already begun crossing the tracks.

The Illinois Attorney General reviewed the case for criminal charges, but due to the conflicting agency reports, it was ultimately determined that the evidence would be insufficient to charge Stokes for the eleven deaths. "Stokes never faced more serious charges, such as involuntary manslaughter, in the accident that also injured 122 people because prosecutors at the time did not believe they could meet the burden of proof," said a spokeswoman for the Illinois attorney general's office. Instead, prosecutors obtained a grand jury indictment against Stokes in September 2001 for one count of willful violation of maximum driving time in violation of Illinois statute 625 ILCS 5/18b-108 (incorporating 49 C.F.R. 395.3) and willful violation of driver's record of duty in violation of Illinois statute 625 ILCS 5/18b-108 (incorporating 49 C.F.R. 395.8), both felonies. He was found guilty on both counts in August 2004.

Stokes was sentenced on September 21, 2004, to two years in prison for logbook, manslaughter, and hours of service violations. At sentencing, Kankakee County Judge Clark Erickson stated that it was not proven whether a lack of rest played a factor in the wreck but that he believed Stokes would have been more able to make safe driving decisions if he had been fully rested. Stokes was later found to have had multiple violations that required his attendance of traffic school five times in three different counties, which should have resulted in his license being suspended at the time of the wreck. He died in February 2007 from a cerebral hemorrhage.

== Aftermath ==
Following the collision, the city of Bourbonnais erected a memorial to the deceased victims at the intersection of Highways 45 and 102, across from the Olivet Nazarene University campus. On January 17, 2006, the Village Board of Bourbonnais voted to permanently close the grade crossing where the accident occurred. A replacement crossing will be built at another location nearby that will, the Village Board hopes, prevent similar wrecks from occurring in the future.

At least 31 civil cases were filed in various courts against parties involved in the wreck. In Illinois, the court placed the cause of the wreck squarely on Stokes, finding:

The manner in which the load of rebar was anchored and secured to the flatbed trailer had nothing to do with the cause of the accident. The accident arose from Stokes' conduct in ignoring the flashing warning lights at the railroad crossing and attempting to drive through the crossing ahead of an oncoming train traveling at nearly 80 miles per hour, where the resulting collision caused pieces of rebar to be thrown onto the tracks derailing the train.

Prior to one trial, Stokes and Melco settled with all the plaintiffs.

== See also ==
- List of rail accidents (1990–99)
- 2005 Glendale train crash: A 2005 level crossing crash between a SUV and a passenger train that caused a similar derailment and casualties.
