= List of level crossing crashes =

The following is an incomplete list of accidents that occur at a level crossing; in other words, this list only includes railway accidents that occur at-grade and not separated from other traffic by bridges and overpasses. This list is incomplete with many countries not reporting accidents, or only listing accidents of a certain level of severity and loss of life.

== Argentina ==
- (Argentina) 11 October 1935 – Near Naón a bus was hit by a train. 10 killed
- (Argentina) 11 June 1962 – Villa Soldati level crossing tragedy, Buenos Aires – 42 people were killed and 88 injured when a bus was hit by an express train.
- (Argentina) 1 February 1964 – A train hit a bus near Paraná. 20 killed and 16 injured.
- (Argentina) 10 January 1965 – Near La Plata a bus was hit by a train. Eight killed and 29 injured
- (Argentina) 31 October 1984 – San Justo level crossing disaster: at least 48 people died and 16 were injured when a local bus was hit by a commuter train.
- (Argentina) 12 May 1992 – A car was hit by a freight train in the village of the Andino, province of Santa Fe. 10 children and one adult died.
- (Argentina) 9 March 2008 – Dolores, Buenos Aires – a bus collided with a passenger train, killing 18 and injuring at least 65, when the bus driver ignored the crossing warning devices.
- (Argentina) 13 September 2011 – Flores, Buenos Aires – a bus collided with a passenger train on a level crossing, derailing the train, which crashed into another train standing in Flores Station. 11 people were killed and 228 injured. The bus driver had ignored the crossing warning lights and partly lowered barrier.
- (Argentina) 2 November 2011 – A freight train collided with a school bus in a rural area of San Luis Province. Eight girls were killed and 41 were injured.

== Australia ==
- (Victoria (state)) 8 May 1943 – Wodonga level crossing accident – Australia's worst road-rail crash. Steam locomotive A2 863 hit a bus carrying soldiers at Tallangatta Road, Wodonga resulting in the death of 25 people.
- (Victoria (state)) 24 February 1951 – 11 people killed in a collision between a bus and a train at a level crossing near Horsham, Victoria.
- (Victoria (state)) 1 June 1952 – Nine killed in bus-train accident at a level crossing at Boronia, Victoria.
- (Australia) 1 April 1970 – In Roseworthy, near Adelaide, 15 were killed and 20 injured in a bus-train collision
- (New South Wales) 10 February 1994 – A Sydney Tangara train collided with a Toyota near Vineyard in the city's North West. The train derailed, causing serious damage to the lead car, car D6274. The Toyota rolled over, seriously injuring the two occupants.
- (New South Wales) 27 January 2001 – Gerogery level crossing accident – Five killed.
- (Victoria (state)) 13 October 2002 – A heritage train, led by K183 collided with a truck at an unprotected level crossing in Benalla – both the driver and fireman of the locomotive were killed along with a footplate visitor, and another footplate visitor was injured.
- (South Australia) 24 October 2002 – An interstate passenger train struck a bus and car stopped on a level crossing at Salisbury – four killed, 26 injured.
- (Victoria (state)) 5 August 2004 – Three killed when a Sprinter passenger train collided with a car stopped on a level crossing at St Albans, Victoria.
- (Victoria (state)) 11 August 2005 – A motorist ignored flashing level crossing lights at Horsham.
- (Victoria (state)) 28 April 2006 – Two killed and 28 injured when a passenger train collided with a truck transporting a 14-tonne granite block, at a passively-protected crossing at Trawalla in western Victoria.
- (Victoria (state)) 25 May 2006 – Lismore level crossing accident – A truck collided with a train at a passively-protected crossing in fog. Truck driver killed.
- 10 March 2007 – A train collided with a truck at Back Creek, New South Wales. The driver of the truck was killed. The three locomotives (8147, 48106 and 48155) were destroyed by a fire that was caused by the crash.
- (Victoria (state)) 5 June 2007 – Kerang train crash – 11 passengers killed when a truck collided with a passenger train, slicing open two carriages. Warning lights protecting the crossing were working.
- (Victoria (state)) 22 August 2007 – Somerville–Tyabb – Truck driver killed. Flashing lights protecting the crossing were working. There were no boom barriers.
- (Victoria (state)) 29 April 2008 – The vehicle of a 'P-Plate' driver was hit by train while stopped on a crossing in Murrumbeena, Victoria.
- (Victoria (state)) 18 November 2008 – A Connex Melbourne express train collided with a car in Dandenong South, Victoria, killing the car's 53-year-old female occupant, after she failed to stop at an actively-protected crossing.
- 27 November 2008 – Two people were killed and several others injured after a QR Tilt Train collided with a truck on the Bruce Highway level crossing about 20 kilometres (12 mi) south of Cardwell, Queensland.
- 1 January 2009 – One person was killed and six others injured after a QR Sunlander train collided with a garbage truck at a level crossing with no boom gates or warning lights, near Innisfail, Queensland.
- (Victoria (state)) 14 November 2011 – One killed after a train collided with car at Toorak Road level crossing in Kooyong, Victoria.
- (Victoria (state)) 28 November 2011 – A train collided with a tip truck stopped on the Springvale Road level crossing in Springvale, Victoria.
- (Victoria (state)) 16 March 2012 – One killed after train collided with car at Cheltenham, Victoria.
- (Victoria (state)) 25 May 2012 – One person killed after a freight train collided with a car stopped on the Cherry Road level crossing in Werribee, Victoria.
- (Victoria (state)) 27 Oct 2012 – Reservoir, Victoria – A train collided with a truck at High Street level crossing with operational boom gates, bells and lights.
- (Victoria (state)) 3 Nov 2012 – Dandenong South, Victoria – A truck ran through Abbotts Road level crossing with operational boom gates, bells and lights, and hit an outbound Cranbourne suburban train travelling at 115 km/h (71 mph). One killed, 13 injured, including the train driver.
- (New South Wales) 21 April 2016 – Coralville, NSW – Mother drove through level crossing, colliding with goods train. Mother and three daughters injured.
- (South Australia) 27 February 2020 – Two people were killed when a Pacific National freight train led by locomotive NR84 collided with a Ford Ranger in Mallala.
- (Victoria (state)) 2 April 2020 – A freight train led by locomotive 8161 collided with a coach in Geelong, Victoria.
- (Victoria (state)) 12 August 2021 – A suburban train collided with a truck in Glen Iris, Melbourne.
- (Victoria (state)) 11 February 2025 – A VLocity train collided with a truck in Kilmany, Victoria.

== Austria ==
- (Austria) 24 August 1935 – A train collided with a bus at a level crossing located between stations of Tristing and Overtisting. Six killed and 14 injured.
- (Austria) 22 October 1975 – A train crashed into a school bus at an unguarded level crossing near the town of Höbersdorf. Seven killed and 43 injured.

== Azerbaijan ==
- (Azerbaijan) 30 August 2012 – Six died and 47 were injured in a bus-train collision near Baku.

== Bangladesh ==
- (Bangladesh) 12 July 2006 – Akkelpur level crossing disaster – A Sayedpur-Khudna passenger train smashed into a passenger bus in Jaipurhat. At least 32 killed and 30 injured.
- 16 April 2008 – According to ATN Bangla television, a Dinajpur–Dhaka Ekoto Express train hit a local bus on a level crossing outside of Kalihati, Tangail, Bangladesh, killing 18 and injuring 30.
- (Bangladesh) 16 May 2016 – The collision between a bus and a train killed 2 and injured 4 more people.

== Belgium ==
- (Belgium) 12 November 1974 – Five killed and several injured in a school bus-train collision near Kortemark.

== Brazil ==
- (Brazil) 27 March 1931 – Near Caxias a train smashed into a bus. Six killed
- (Brazil) 7 June 1951 – Nova Iguaçu level crossing disaster — a commuter train smashed into a truck carrying gasoline, and at least 54 people were killed.

== Canada ==
- (Canada) 29 November 1960 – School bus struck by train near Lamont, Alberta. 17 students killed.
- (Canada) 7 October 1966 – Dorion level crossing accident – 19 killed
- (Canada) 12 December 1975 – A TTC bus travelling east on St. Clair Ave. E. collided with a westbound GO Transit train at the level crossing just west of Midland Ave. Nine people were killed and 20 others injured. This was the worst accident in terms of loss of life in the history of the TTC and GO Transit systems. The level crossing was replaced by an overpass a few years later.
- (Canada) 20 June 1979 – Car collided with Via Rail train near Pointe à la Garde, Quebec. Five killed.
- (Canada) 15 January 1989 – Car collided with Canadian National Railway freight train near Sarnia, Ontario. Five killed.
- (Canada) 14 January 1990 – Truck collided with Via Rail train near Pembroke, Ontario. Two killed.
- (Canada) 6 February 1990 – Via Rail train struck a car near Lancaster, Ontario. Two killed.
- (Canada) 10 June 1990 – Via Rail train struck a car near Alexandria, Ontario; warning sign removed by vandals. Two killed.
- (Canada) 11 February 1992 – Via Rail train struck a tractor trailer near Coteau-du-Lac, Quebec. Four train passengers killed; 48 injured.
- (Canada) 25 August 1992 – Via Rail train struck a van north of Cornwall, Ontario. Two killed; six injured.
- (Canada) 27 August 1992 – Via Rail train struck a van north of Cornwall, Ontario. Two killed.
- (Canada) 11 October 1992 – Logging truck collided with Ontario Northland Railway passenger train near New Liskeard, Ontario. Truck driver and several train passengers were injured.
- (Canada) 5 September 1993 – Via Rail train struck car near Stratford, Ontario. Six killed.
- (Canada) 24 October 1993 – Via Rail train struck police cruiser near Casselman, Ontario. Two killed.
- (Canada) 21 December 1993 – Car collided with Canadian Pacific Railway freight train near Osgoode, Ontario. One injured.
- (Canada) 26 December 1993 – Canadian Pacific Railway freight train struck car near Arnprior, Ontario. One killed; two injured.
- (Canada) 5 August 1994 – Van collided with Canadian National Railway freight train near Kanata, Ontario. One killed.
- (Canada) 30 September 1994 – Car collided with freight train in Gatineau, Quebec. Two injured.
- (Canada) 16 December 1994 – Via Rail train struck tractor trailer in Smiths Falls, Ontario. No injuries.
- (Canada) 13 February 1998 – Tractor trailer collided with Via Rail train near Carlsbad Springs, Ontario. One killed.
- (Canada) 21 February 1998 – Via Rail train collided with vehicle in Montague Township, Ontario. One killed; four injured.
- (Canada) 30 November 1998 – Ottawa Valley RaiLink freight train collided with vehicle near Carleton Place, Ontario. One injured.
- (Canada) 29 March 1999 – Car collided with Canadian Pacific Railway freight train near Kemptville, Ontario. Driver survived.
- (Canada) 19 November 1999 – Canadian Pacific Railway freight train struck SUV near Milton, Ontario. One killed; two injured.
- (Canada) 25 July 2000 – Car hit by train north of Cornwall, Ontario. One killed.
- (Canada) September 2000 – Via Rail train struck vehicle near Limehouse, Ontario. Three people killed.
- (Canada) 3 September 2000 – Passenger car collided with Chemin de Fer Québec Sud freight train near Brigham, Quebec. Four killed.
- (Canada) 13 May 2002 – Via Rail train collided with tractor-trailer after warning gates failed to operate. Occupants escaped but vehicle struck.
- (Canada) 2 January 2008 – Vehicle collided with freight train near Franktown, Ontario. One injured.
- (Canada) 4 August 2008 – Freight train struck ATV near Shawville, Quebec. One injured.
- (Canada) 3 September 2008 – Ottawa Valley Railway freight train collided with passenger van near Braeside, Ontario. Two injured.
- (Canada) 24 January 2009 – A train collided with an empty police cruiser left at the crossing on Wallace Avenue, in Toronto.
- (Canada) 25 January 2009 – A man was killed in Vanier after his car collided with a train on one of the last two level crossings in Quebec City.
- (Canada) 14 October 2009 – Passenger train collided with vehicle stopped on tracks, in Nanaimo, British Columbia. Two killed, one injured.
- (Canada) 2009 – A Canadian National train collided with a flatbed truck in Vancouver. No one was hurt or killed.
- (Canada) May 2010 – Via Rail train struck truck in northwestern Alberta. Three people were killed.
- (Canada) 26 October 2010 – Via Rail train collided with SUV north of Kingston, Ontario. One killed; one critically injured.
- (Canada) 18 September 2013 – 2013 Ottawa bus–train crash – OC Transpo double-decker bus collided with Via Rail train near the Barrhaven neighbourhood of Ottawa. Six people were killed and 34 were injured.

== Chile ==
- (Chile) 26 June 1928 – Unknown place, seven dead and 27 injured
- (Chile) 13 August 1999 – A train collided with a schoolbus at Longaví. Eight killed and 20 injured.

== China ==
- (China) 23 December 1988 – Qinghemen level crossing disaster – A local bus was hit by a passenger train in Shenyang, at least 46 were killed and 63 were injured.
- (China) 17 January 1989 – Huinan level crossing disaster – A local bus was hit by a passenger train, at least 32 were killed and 41 injured.
- (China) 31 January 1993 – Gaotaishan level crossing disaster – A Chifeng-Dalian passenger train collided with an overcrowded bus, which killed 66 people and injured 29 in Liaoning.
- (China) 30 April 1993 – Yingkou level crossing disaster – A passenger train collided with a bus, which killed 36 people and injured 38 in Liaoning.
- (China) 16 September 1999 – Yibin level crossing disaster – At least 25 people were killed and 24 were injured, when a passenger train collided with a school bus.
- (China) 24 December 2001 – Artux level crossing disaster – At least 28 people were killed and 11 were injured, when a mini bus was hit by Ürümqi–Kashgar passenger train in Xinjiang.

== Denmark ==
- (Denmark) 8 September 2025 – A passenger train struck a slurry tanker and derailed between Tinglev and Kliplev, killing one person and injuring 27 others, including five seriously.

== Hong Kong ==
- (Hong Kong) 29 July 1994 – A LRT vehicle was hit by a container lorry at a level crossing at the injunction of Wu King Road and Wu Shan Road in Tuen Mun, operator killed, four injured.

== Colombia ==
- (Colombia) 11 January 1970 – Santa Marta, a train collided with a bus. 36 killed and 24 injured.

== Cuba ==
- (Cuba) 27 July 1935 – Near Matanzas, a train collided with bus. 15 killed and more injured
- 7 November 1997 – Holguín level crossing disaster – A local bus was hit by a Havana–Santiago de Cuba passenger train, at least 56 were killed and six were injured.
- 6 October 2007 – Veguita level crossing disaster – A local bus was hit by Santiago de Cuba-Manzanillo passenger train near the village of Veguita, in the municipality of Yara. At least 28 people died and 73 were injured.

== Czech Republic ==
- (Czech Republic) 22 July 2015 – Studénka train crash – A Bohumín-Františkovy Lázně Pendolino train collided with a lorry in Studénka, which killed 3 and injured 17 people.
- 23 July 2026 - A Regionova passenger train collided with a truck at a railway crossing near the village of Dobronice-u-Khynova in the south of the Czech Republic, derailing the first carriage of the train, Four people were injured.

== Denmark ==
- (Denmark) 1 May 1966 – A bus-train collision near Herning killed 10 people.

== Egypt ==
- (Kingdom of Egypt) 19 March 1936 – Unknown place - A train smashed into a bus.14 killed and 17 injured
- (Egypt) 20 October 1979 – Imbaba level crossing disaster – A suburban passenger train smashed into a public bus in Giza Governorate, which killed 28 and injured 30 people.
- 11 December 1987 – According to the Egyptian government, a bus carrying local primary school children returning from the Giza Zoo was hit by a high-speed train at an unmarked railroad level crossing at Ain Shams, on the outskirts Cairo, Egypt, killing 62 children and injuring 67.
- (Egypt) 16 April 1995 – Al Minufiyah level crossing disaster – At least 49 textile workers were killed when a bus was hit by an express train in the Nile Delta.
- (Egypt) 16 July 2008 – Marsa Matruh – A truck failed to stop, pushing waiting traffic into the path of the train. At least 40 killed.
- (Egypt) 17 November 2012 – Manfalut train accident – School bus carrying about 60 pre-school children between four and six years old was hit by a train on a rail crossing near Manfalut, 350 km (220 mi) south of the Egyptian capital Cairo. At least 50 children and the bus driver were killed in the crash. About 17 people were also injured.
- (Egypt) 18 November 2013 – Bus hit by a train at a crossing by warning light and chain, at Dahshour near Giza. 26 killed returning from a wedding

== France ==
- (France) 8 February 1921 – A military bus was hit by a train near the station in Saint-Étienne. 10 killed and two seriously injured.
- (France) 19 October 1979 – Séméac level crossing disaster – An express train crashed into a Spanish coach carrying pilgrims returning from Rome, killing 21 and injuring 29. In 1980, the city of San Sebastián awarded a Golden Drum to the people of Tarbes for the support they provided during this event.
- (France) 8 July 1985 – Saint-Pierre-du-Vauvray Accident - A collision between a train and a truck killed 17 people and injured 99. A tunnel was later built to provide better safety.
- (France) 8 September 1997 – Port-Sainte-Foy Accident - A collision with a gasoline tanker. 13 killed, 43 injured. The truck driver and company were charged. After the collision, the decision was made to replace 15 level crossings with bridges or tunnels each year.
- (France) 2 June 2008 – Allinges Accident - A train hit a bus carrying middle schoolers, killing seven and injuring 25. It was decided to add additional traffic lights and to limit bus/coach traffic where appropriate.
- (France) 14 December 2017 – Millas train-bus collision - A school bus was hit at a level crossing. Six deaths and 24 injuries, with the cause unclear.
- (France) 7 April 2026 – A inOui TGV POS hit a truck in Bully-les-Mines, 1 died and 27 injured.

== Germany ==
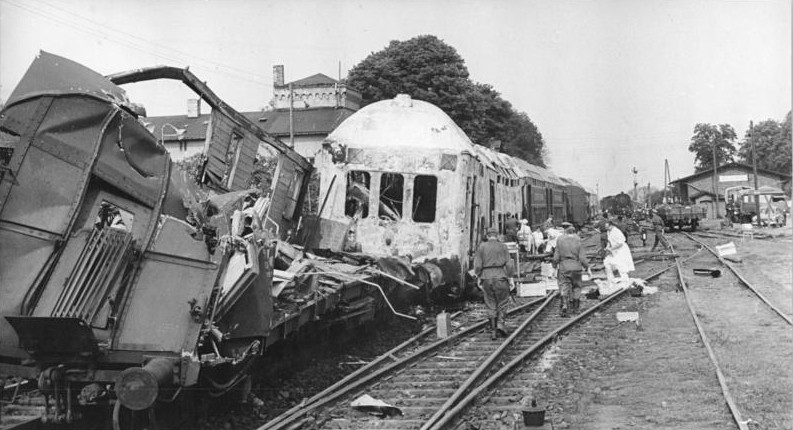
Langenweddingen disaster, East Germany (DDR)

- (Germany) 1 January 1930 – In Berlín a train struck a bus. Five killed and 10 seriously injured
- 20 June 1959 – Lauffen bus crash — A crowded bus collided with a train on a level crossing in Lauffen, West Germany killing 45. The worst bus accident in German history at that time.
- (East Germany) 6 July 1967 – Langenweddingen level crossing disaster — 94 killed.
- (West Germany) 7 March 1975 – in Munich a bus-train collision left 12 dead and five seriously injured.
- 16 May 2015 – Ibbenbüren train collision — A tractor trailer carrying liquid manure became stuck at a level crossing at Ibbenbüren, North Rhine-Westphalia, Germany when it was hit by a Stadler FLIRT train. 22 people were hurt (six seriously) and two killed including a passenger.
- 12 February 2025 – 2025 Hamburg train accident: An Intercity Express train struck with a semi-truck loaded with rails in Hamburg, Germany, killing Thomas Großbölting, the director of the Research Center for Contemporary History in Hamburg, and injuring 25 others.
- (Germany) 30 September 2025 – A regional train struck an ambulance near Ahaus, North Rhine-Westphalia, killing one and injuring five others.

== Greece ==
- (Greece) December 1929 – A train smashed into a bus at a crossing near Okchilar station en route from Xandhria to Drama. 12 killed and six injured.

== Hungary ==
- (Hungary) 30 January 1973 – Helvecia level crossing disaster – A commuter train smashed into a regular route bus, at least 37 people were killed and 18 people were injured.
- (Hungary) 8 May 2003 – Lake Balaton level crossing disaster – A double-decker bus from Germany was hit by Budapest–Nagykanizsa express train, at least 34 were killed and 42 were injured.

== India ==
- (India) 9 December 1964 – Deoria level crossing disaster — A bus was hit by a passenger train in Uttar Pradesh, at least 29 people were killed and 72 were injured.
- (India) 16 May 1968 – An express train crashed into a bus at an unmanned railway crossing near Brecha railway station, killing 30 people and injuring 35.
- (India) 11 September 1986 – Pathali Pahar level crossing disaster — A local bus was hit by a passenger train in Assam, at least 28 people were killed and 60 people injured.
- (India) 19 March 1991 – Annupur level crossing disaster — An out-of-control bus smashed through a railway gate and then was hit by a passenger train in Madhya Pradesh, at least 35 people died, 27 people injured.
- (India) 10 December 1993 – Poona level crossing disaster – A Sahyadi Express train crashed into a bus carrying school children in Maharashtra, which killed 38 and injured 41 people.
- (India) 3 May 1994 – A passenger train rammed into a tractor in Andhra Pradesh, killing 35 people.
- (India) 14 May 1996 – A passenger train crashed into a bus in Kerala, killing 35 people.
- (India) 25 May 1996 – A passenger train crashed into a tractor trailer in Uttar Pradesh, killing 25 people.
- (India) 27 April 1999 – Jhukia level crossing disaster — A bus with a wedding party was hit by passenger train in Bahraich, Uttar Pradesh, at least 35 people were killed and 40 seriously injured.
- (India) 2 February 2005 – A passenger train crashed into a tractor-trailer carrying over 60 people at the Nagpur level crossing, killing over 55 people.
- (India) 7 July 2011 – Dariyaiganj level crossing accident – A Mathura-Chhapra passenger train rammed into a bus carrying wedding guests in Kanshiram Nagar, Uttar Pradesh, which killed 38 people and injured another 32.
- (India) 26 April 2018 – Dudhinagar level crossing accident - A fast passenger train crashed into a school bus near Dudhinagar, district of Kushinagar, Uttar Pradesh. 13 children died and eight were seriously injured.

== Indonesia ==
- (Netherlands) 21 January 1932 – Unknown place. A train collided with a bus. Seven killed and 12 injured.
- (Indonesia) 4 November 1997 – Kotabumi level crossing disaster – An express train smashed into a bus in Sumatra, which killed at least 25 and injured many others.
- (Indonesia) 3 November 2001 – Serang level crossing disaster – A freight train smashed into a bus carrying local pilgrims in West Java, killing 20 people.
- (Indonesia) 9 December 2013 – 2013 Bintaro train crash - A commuter train smashed into a Pertamina tanker truck in Jakarta and derailed, which killed seven people including the drivers, assistant engineer, and the train technician. At least 73 passengers were injured.
- (Indonesia) 4 May 2014 – Cirebon Train Derailment - Bogowonto train pulled by CC206 hit a container truck and derailed at Cirebon grade crossing. There were no passengers killed in the accident, but the derailment delayed other trains.
- (Indonesia) 6 December 2015 – A Commuter Line hit a Metromini city bus at the Angke station level crossing, killing 18 people inside the Metromini. The front body of Commuter Line was severely damaged. This accident contributed to the Metromini ban as they were gradually replaced by Transjakarta. Several level crossings in Jakarta were going to be closed prior to this accident.
- (Indonesia) 6 April 2018 – Sancaka 86 derailment - Sancaka train 86 hit a concrete carrier trailer truck and derailed at Ngawi, killing the train's driver.
- (Indonesia) 27 February 2022 – Tulungagung level crossing crash - Five people died and several others injured after a bus carrying 41 passengers was hit by a passenger train in Tulungagung.
- (Indonesia) 27 April 2026 – Bekasi train crash - A Green SM taxi was hit by a passenger commuter train in Bekasi after being stalled or stopped at an unmarked railroad crossing in Ampera Road, approximately 300 metres (980 ft; 330 yd) away from Bekasi Timur station. As a result of the incident, PLB 5568A, served by a 10-car Tokyo Metro 6000, was unable to resume after stopping at Bekasi Timur station which cause Argo Bromo Anggrek's KA 4 service crashed into PLB 5568A minutes later. 16 killed & 91 injured.

== Israel ==
- (Israel) 12 June 1985 – HaBonim disaster – A passenger train smashed into a bus carrying school children, at least 22 people were killed and 17 were injured.

== Italy ==
- (Kingdom of Italy) 2 October 1922 – A train hit a bus near Erbè. Six killed and 14 injured.
- (Kingdom of Italy) 6 July 1925 – A train smashed into a bus near Siena. Four killed and an unknown number injured.
- (Kingdom of Italy) 26 September 1934 – Bus-train collision near Terno d'Isola, nine killed and eight seriously injured.
- (Italy) 15 November 1960 – In Mandela, near Roma, a bus was struck by a train, killing seven and injuring another two.
- (Italy) 11 September 1972 – In Summaga di Portogruaro (Veneto) a train struck a bus. Five died and 15 more were injured.

== Japan ==
- (Japan) 10 June 1958 – Nantan, Kyoto – Four people were killed and 88 injured. Steam locomotive collided with an elementary school charter bus.
- (Japan) 3 January 1959 – Osaka, Osaka – Seven people were killed and 13 injured. An OMTB bus was hit by two Hankyu Railway trains coming from both directions, which caused by the delayed closing of the crossing signalman.
- (Japan) 12 December 1960 – Maniwa, Okayama – 10 people were killed and 50 injured. A Chutetsu bus was hit by a train at a crossing without a crossing signal.
- (Japan) 20 September 1963 – Fukuoka, Fukuoka – Eight people were killed. Four-car train collided with a truck and derailed, and another one-car train collided with the derailed train.
- (Japan) 22 September 1966 – Koshigaya, Saitama – A Tobu Bus headed for Koshigaya Station collided with a southbound limited express on the Tobu Isesaki Line at a crossing, leaving six dead and more than 40 injured.
- (Japan) 1 April 1967 – Sennan, Osaka – A southbound Nankai Dentetsu express train collided with a truck, killing five and injuring 208 others.
- (Japan) 9 December 1969 – Tatebayashi, Gunma – A crane truck ignored the crossing signal and was hit by a southbound train on the Tobu Isesaki Line, killing seven and injuring 101.
- (Japan) 30 March 1970 – Shimonoseki, Yamaguchi – Five people were killed and 29 injured. The train collided with a concrete mixer lorry and derailed.
- (Japan) 4 March 1971 – Fujiyoshida, Yamanashi – 17 people were killed and 71 injured. The train's brakes malfunctioned and it collided with a small truck.
- (Japan) 5 September 2019 – Yokohama, Kantō region – An eight-carriage rapid limited express on the Keikyū Main Line derailed after the train collided with a truck at a crossing in Kanagawa Ward, Yokohama, at around 11:40 a.m. The truck driver was killed and 30 passengers onboard train were injured.
- (Japan) 1 January 2026 – Shiraoka, Saitama – A local train bound for Koga from Hiratsuka collided with a car at a level crossing on the JR East Utsunomiya Line. The car severely damaged and the person inside was trapped. Part of the train’s cars derailed.

== South Korea ==
- (South Korea) January 1954 – Osan level crossing disaster — A truck, carrying an army infantry school, smashed into local passenger train, at least 56 people died and many were injured in Hwaseong, Gyeonggi-do.
- (South Korea) 9 January 1969 – Unknown place - A bus was hit by a train. 19 dead and 7 injured.
- (South Korea) 14 October 1970 – Mosan level crossing disaster — A charter bus was hit by an express train. 46 people were killed and 30 injured.

== Kenya ==
- (Kenya) 17 August 2000 – Six died in Kisumu, after a freight train hit a full bus on a busy level crossing during the morning rush hour.
- (Kenya) 30 October 2013 – Bus-train collision in Nairobi, 11 killed and 30 injured.
- 7 August 2025 – a freight train struck a Kenya Pipeline Company bus, killing eight people and injuring more than 10 others.

== Luxembourg ==
- (Luxembourg) 5 July 2021 - A passenger train hit a car in Bertrange, 0 died and 0 injured.

== Mexico ==
- (Mexico) 19 August 1930 – Near Puebla, a locomotive collided with a bus. Four killed and seven injured
- (Mexico) 30 January 1969 – A bus-train collision near Puebla results in 14 killed and four injured
- (Mexico) 11 April 1971 – In San Cristóbal Ecatepec a bus-train collision left seven dead and 12 injured.
- 8 February 1975 – Cuautitlán level crossing accident — A Mexico City–Ciudad Juárez passenger train smashed into an express bus, at least 29 people died and 32 were injured.
- (Mexico) 17 January 1977 – Tlalnepantla level crossing disaster — A passenger train smashed into a local bus, at least 42 people were killed.
- 15 August 1982 – Tula level crossing disaster — An express bus was hit by a Nuevo Laredo-Mexico City passenger train, at least 23 people were killed and 32 were injured.
- (Mexico) 25 February 1989 – Saltillo level crossing disaster — A passenger train smashed into a local bus, at least 22 people were killed.
- (Mexico) 14 January 1990 – Léon level crossing disaster — A local bus was hit by a freight train, at least 33 people died and 26 were injured.
- 1997 – Mexico City a commuter train hit a fuel tanker at a crossing and later exploded, killing at least 20 people; the explosion was recorded by a news helicopter.
- (Mexico) December 2006 – Cuautitlán level crossing disaster — A passenger bus was hit by 36 cars of a freight train. At least 28 people killed and another 14 injured.
- (Mexico) 6 August 2025 — Irapuato, Guanajuato — Around 12:15 p.m. on Wednesday, August 6, a Ferromex ES44AC locomotive detached from the train traveling in the city of Irapuato and, out of control, crashed into several vehicles, leaving 6 people dead and 2 more injured.
- (Mexico) 8 September 2025 — 2025 Atlacomulco bus crash — A freight train hit a double-decker passenger bus. At least 10 people were killed and 41 others were injured.
- (Mexico) 6 May 2026 — Colón, Querétaro — A Ferromex freight train was hit a truck loaded with diesel fuel that was crossing the tracks at the underpass of the Viborillas bridge, which causes explosion by a large fire affected a pickup truck parked nearby. Two were killed and four others were injured.

== Moldova ==
- (Moldova) 1 November 2011 – Near Novie Aneni, a train smashed into a bus. Eight killed and 20 injured.

== Morocco ==
- (Morocco) 1 March 2000 – Ksar el-Kebir – A train crashed into a tractor trailer that carried 50 agricultural workers – 36 killed and 10 injured – Accident was due to fog.
- (Morocco) 20 May 2012 – Near Ben Guerir – A school bus was struck by a train, killing nine and injuring another 10.

== The Netherlands ==
- (Netherlands) 17 February 1944 – Lisse – A truck carrying workers was pushed onto the crossing after a collision with another truck, and was hit by train. Nine killed, many injured.
- (Netherlands) 25 May 1954 – Zandbulten – A bus carrying wedding guests was hit by train, six dead and around 20 injured.
- (Netherlands) 10 October 1977 – IJsselmuiden – Car was hit by train on level crossing, six killed.
- (Netherlands) 22 July 1986 – Brummen – Van, transporting mentally disabled people, was hit by train on level crossing leaving six dead and two injured.
- (Netherlands) 16 June 2000 – Klarenbeek – Car with caravan drove through a red light at a rail crossing and was struck by train, family of five killed.
- (Netherlands) 23 February 2016 – Dalfsen train crash involving slow-moving elevated work platform on steel caterpillar tracks.

== New Zealand ==
- (New Zealand) 25 August 1993 – Rolleston — A truck failed to stop for level crossing alarms and hit the side of a southbound Southerner express passenger train, killing three people and seriously injuring seven.
- (New Zealand) 14 November 1996 – Hilderthorpe, North Otago - The Southerner passenger train was involved in a level-crossing crash at Hilderthorpe, North Otago, killing four people.
- (New Zealand) 22 March 1997 – Trentham – A Wellington to Upper Hutt suburban service hit a car on a level crossing after the alarms and barrier arms failed to activate, injuring three people. The train driver had passed a signal at danger immediately before the crossing.
- (New Zealand) July 2000 – The Southerner passenger train collided with a ute at Edendale, 53 kilometres (33 mi) north of Invercargill.
- (New Zealand) 8 January 2001 – Canterbury - The Southerner passenger train hit a cattle truck on a level crossing. The DC-class locomotive and two of three passenger carriages were derailed, injuring 21 passengers and requiring 10 cattle to be shot dead.
- (New Zealand) 31 October 2011 – At Paekākāriki, Wellington, a 12.6-metre-long three-axle low-floor bus became stuck on the Beach Road level crossing waiting at a stop sign to turn right onto State Highway 1, and was hit by a southbound freight train. No injuries were reported. The accident was caused by the bus stopping in a position where its single driving axle was off the ground above a drain, combined with an insufficient 'stacking distance' between the level crossing and State Highway 1, meaning any vehicle over 10 metres long could not stop without encroaching either the railway line or the State Highway.
- (New Zealand) 22 February 2014 – Rangiriri – The southbound Northern Explorer travelling from Auckland to Wellington with 108 passengers on board collided with an articulated truck at the level crossing on Te Onetea Road. The 28-year-old driver of the truck died at the scene. The TAIC investigation found two safety issues contributing to the accident.

== Pakistan ==
- (Pakistan) October 1987 – Moro level crossing disaster — At least 50 people died and 40 were injured when a passenger train smashed into a bus.
- (Pakistan) 20 September 2003 – Malikwal level crossing disaster — A bus was hit by a Lalamusa-Surghuda local train. At least 27 were killed and 10 injured.
- (Pakistan) January 2010 – Mian Channun town, about 100 kilometres east of the central city of Multan in Punjab province – Due to fog, a train collided with a school bus. Nine killed and 18 injured.

== Philippines ==
- (Philippines) 15 May 1972 – Bus-train collision in Angeles, Pampanga. A northbound JMC class DMU hit a La Mallorca–Pambusco bus, exploding its gas tank and setting it on fire. At least 10 people were killed and "scores" more were reported to be injured.
- (Philippines) 1968 – MC class DMU led by unit No. 324 collided with an overloaded Volkswagen Beetle in Barrio Real (today Barangay Real), Calamba, Laguna, resulting in eight deaths. It was ruled out that the Beetle was overtaking a jeepney. The car was then displayed near the crossing as a warning for motorists attempting to ignore level crossings.
- (Philippines) 18 October 2011 – A PNR Train 101DMR05 Bicol bound was struck the left rear portion of the taxi cab around 5:15 a.m. at the railroad tracks between Antipolo and Algeciras Streets, crossing España Boulevard in Sampaloc, Manila.
- (Philippines) 19 May 2014 – A PNR train collided with a jeepney at the corner of G. Tuazon and Algeciras streets in Sampaloc, Manila. As the result, 1 died and 6 injuries reported.
- (Philippines) 12 January 2016 – A PNR train collided with a jeepney where was in the middle of the tracks around 7 p.m. at the crossing of Quirino Avenue corner Pedro Gil Street near at Paco station. The jeepney driver was charged where 1 passenger died and 5 others were injured.

== Peru ==
- (Peru) 26 May 2024 – Four people were killed and 13 were injured after a freight train collided with a bus in La Oroya District.

== Poland ==
- (Poland) 22 February 1932 – Bus-train collision in Warsaw. 10 people killed and 12 seriously injured.
- (Poland) 19 January 1952 – 17 people were killed after a train collided with a truck in Występa.
- (Poland) 6 December 1962 – Nine killed and three more seriously injured when a train struck a bus in Mińsk Mazowiecki
- (Poland) 19 September 1985 – Six people were killed and 14 were injured after a freight train collided with a Jelcz PR110U city bus in Olsztyn.
- (Poland) 30 July 2012 – Nine people were killed and one person was seriously injured after a train and a minibus collided in the Polish town of Bratoszewice.
- (Poland) 15 November 2007 – Two people were killed after a train collided with a truck, when the truck driver had ignored warning lights and bells in Poledno.

== Portugal ==
- (Portugal) 24 August 1933 – Near Ceira (Coimbra District), a train struck a bus. Four killed and 23 injured.
- (Portugal) 2 May 1938 – In Viana do Castelo, at 00:15am, on the Gontim street level crossing, a train crashed into an open-box lorry carrying more than 40 people returning from Labour Day celebrations. 28 of them were killed and 17 injured.
- (Portugal) 26 April 1984 – Terronho crossing, Recarei, Paredes – Train-bus collision at 07:30am. 17 killed and over 20 injured.

== Romania ==
- (Romania) July 1931 – Unknown place, train hit a school bus, five dead and 22 injured
- (Romania) July 1935 – In Piatra-Olt a bus was hit by a train. Five killed and 12 injured.
- (Romania) 14 August 2009 – Scânteia train accident, at least 14 people died after a collision between a bus and a train.

== Russia ==
- (Soviet Union) (Russian Soviet Federative Socialist Republic) 7 July 1990 – Petrozavodsk level crossing disaster – A local bus service from Padozero to Petrozavodsk collided with a suburban train on the Petrozavodsk-Suoyarvi route on the 14th km of the A133. 33 of the 80 passengers on the bus were killed. 11 July was declared a day of mourning in the Karelian ASSR.
- (Soviet Union) (Russian Soviet Federative Socialist Republic) 10 November 1990 – Sverdlovsk level crossing disaster – A local bus collided with two trains. 16 people killed.
- (Russia) 26 September 1996 – 1996 Rostov Oblast disaster – a bus was hit by a train near Mokry Botay, Rostov Oblast. 21 children and one adult killed, 18 injured.
- (Russia) 21 January 2006 – Voronezhskaya level crossing disaster — At least 21 people were killed and six were injured when a bus carrying factory workers was hit by a Mineralnye Vody–Krasnodar passenger train.
- (Russia) 6 October 2017 – A train travelling from St. Petersburg to Nizhny-Novgorod collided with a bus at a level crossing in the city of Vladimir, killing 16 people. The bus was suspected to have stalled due to an engine malfunction.
- (Russia) 1 April 2024 – A bus collided with a train in Yaroslavl Oblast. Eight killed.
- (Russia) 29 July 2024 – A truck collided with a train in Volgograd Oblast. Eight cars derailed and overturned. Over 100 people injured.
- (Russia) 26 September 2025 – A freight train carrying gasoline derailed and caught fire after colliding with a truck in Smolensk Oblast. The truck driver was presumed to have been killed and the occupants of the train sustained moderate injuries.

== Serbia ==
- (Serbia) 21 December 2018 – At Donje Međurovo, near Niš, a school bus-train collision caused five deaths and 30 injuries.

== Slovakia ==
- (Slovakia) 21 February 2009 – Slovak coach and train collision − 12 killed.
- (Slovakia) 27 June 2024 – A EuroCity train collided with a bus near Nové Zámky, seven people were killed in the collision.

== South Africa ==
- (South Africa) 12 July 1966 - Near Bergietersrus, a train collided with a bus. 25 killed and 28 injured.
- (South Africa) 28 January 1970 – Henley on Klip level crossing disaster — An express train hit a bus carrying local students, killing 23 and injuring 16.
- (South Africa) 7 June 1980 – Empangeni level crossing disaster — A Nkilini–Empangeni passenger train hit a bus, killing 69 and injuring 93 people.
- (South Africa) 2005 – Johannesburg level crossing accident — Nine killed.
- (South Africa) 12 November 2006 – Faure level crossing accident — A Metrorail commuter train hit a truck carrying local farmworkers, killing 19 and injuring six.
- (South Africa) 25 August 2010 – Blackheath level crossing accident — A Metrorail commuter train hit a minibus filled with school children, killing 10. Accident allegedly due to the minibus driver's negligence.
- (South Africa) 13 July 2012 – Hectorspruit level crossing accident — A goods train hauling coal from Witbank to Maputo smashed into a truck carrying 44 farm workers near Hectorspruit, Mpumalanga, killing 26 people.
- (South Africa) 4 January 2018 – Hennenman–Kroonstad train crash — A truck trying to beat a passenger train through a crossing was struck by it, killing 21.

== Spain ==
- (Spain) 19 December 1929 – Gelida level crossing accident – Gelida (Barcelona) – Bus-train collision.17 killed and eight injured.
- (Spain) 17 April 1930 – Gilet level crossing accident – Gilet (Valencia) – Bus-train collision. 13 killed and 20 injured.
- (Spain) 10 June 1934 – La Pola de Gordón crossing accident – La Pola de Gordón (León) – Bus-train collision. 20 killed and 11 injured.
- (Spain) 15 July 1937 – Mail train from Cartagena to Madrid hit a truck loaded with explosives at a crossing near Cieza (Murcia) - At least 14 people died and more than 200 injured.
- (Spain) 29 March 1938 – In Meliana (Valencia) a train struck a tanker lorry loaded with gasoline. The number of victims is unknown, it is estimated 23 were killed and several injured.
- (Spain) 7 September 1938 – A train hit a lorry loaded with gasoline near to Sarrià de Ter (Girona), killing 19 and injuring 21 more.
- (Spain) 24 January 1951 – In Vinallop (Tarragona) mail train from Valencia to Barcelona hit a truck and derailed. 14 killed and 30 injured
- (Spain) 30 June 1965 – Arahal crossing accident – Arahal (Seville) – Bus-train collision – 12 killed and 30 injured
- (Spain) 23 November 1976 – A train hit a lorry loaded with iron bars at a crossing in Massalfassar (Valencia). 14 people died and 21 were injured.
- (Spain) 21 December 1978 – Muñoz level crossing disaster – Muñoz, La Fuente de San Esteban (Salamanca) – A bus carrying school children hit by a Salamanca-bound locomotive, 32 people were killed and 56 people were injured.
- (Spain) 24 September 1980 – Vara de Quart level crossing disaster – Vara de Quart, Xirivella (Valencia) – A Valencia-Madrid express train smashed into a local bus, which killed 25 and injured 28 people.
- (Spain) 25 March 1988 – Juneda level crossing accident – Juneda (Lleida) – Schoolbus-train collision. 15 killed and 23 injured.
- (Spain) 3 January 2001 – Lorca level crossing accident – Lorca (Province of Murcia) – Van-train collision. 12 killed and two injured.

== Sri Lanka ==
- (Sri Lanka) 17 January 1989 – Ahungalla level crossing accident, — At least 51 people were killed and 110 were injured.
- 27 April 2005 – Polgahawela level crossing collision, Sri Lanka — A bus tried to beat the train at a level crossing; at least 35 people were killed.

== Sweden ==
- (Sweden) 23 July 1923 – Unknown place - A train hit a bus. Eight killed and 20 injured.
- (Sweden) September 2004 – Nosaby level crossing disaster - A truck with a trailer stopped on the single track line as the barrier came down, getting stuck between the truck and the trailer. The truck driver left the cab to lift the barrier by hand. A Y2-class DMU passed the level crossing distant signal, which showed "expect clear", at 161 km/h. Seeing the crossing blocked, the train driver engaged the emergency brake, slowing the train to 123 km/h at impact. The driver and one passenger were killed instantly, the guard and another passenger were severely injured; a total of 47 passengers were injured. The truck driver was later sentenced to 14 months in jail for causing death and reckless driving.

== Switzerland ==
- 12 September 1982 – A bus carrying German tourists collided with a train on a level crossing near Zürich, Switzerland, killing 39. The barriers were not closed because the operator pressed the wrong button. Only two passengers survived the crash.

== Taiwan ==
- (Taiwan) 11 March 1961 – 27 killed and 15 injured when a south-bound passenger train (#3001 Diesel Limited Express) smashed into a truck carrying soldiers at level crossing between Linfengyin (林鳳營) and Longtien (隆田), Tainan.
- (Taiwan) 8 July 1961 – 48 killed and 28 injured when a south-bound passenger train (#11 Limited Express) smashed into a bus at level crossing in Minxong, Chiayi County.
- (Taiwan) 21 April 1976 – Tacheng level crossing disaster – South-bound passenger train (#33 Kuan-kuang Limited Express; Kuan-kuang Hao) smashed into a bus carrying high school students in Dacun (大村), Changhua, which killed 40 and injured 42 people.
- (Taiwan) 8 March 1981 – Hsinchu level crossing disaster — At least 30 people died and 131 people were injured, when a north-bound passenger train (#1002 Tzu-chiang Limited Express, Tzu-chiang Hao) smashed into a truck at the south shore of the Toucian River, Hsinchu.
- (Taiwan) 20 December 1990 – Lujhu (Luzhu, 路竹) level crossing disaster — At least 25 people were killed and 32 people injured when a north-bound train (#1020 Tzu-chiang Limited Express) smashed into a tour bus.
- (Taiwan) 10 April 2020 – Kaohsiung level crossing incident – Four people were taken to hospital after a local commuter train hit a truck on a level crossing in Kaohsiung City.

== Tanzania ==
- 6 November 2014 – 12 people died (six men, four women and two girls) and others were injured when a bus collided with a train at Kiberege in Tanzania's eastern region. The bus driver, who crossed without taking precautions, fled after the incident.

== Thailand ==
- (Thailand) July 1967 — Korat level crossing disaster — At least 40 were killed and 39 were injured when an overcrowded bus was hit by an express train in Nakhon Ratchasima.
- (Thailand) May 1988 — Takhli level crossing disaster — A truck slammed into the side of a Lopburi−Pitsanulok passenger train, at least 27 were killed.
- (Thailand) 6 June 2018 — One killed at Korat level crossing.
- (Thailand) 16 May 2026 — Bangkok level crossing disaster — A freight train collided with an air-conditioned bus near Makkasan station, resulting in 8 deaths and 32 injuries.

== Turkey ==
- 25 July 2004 – A train smashed into a bus in western Turkey, 14 killed and six injured.

== Turkmenistan ==
- (Turkmenistan) 19 September 1998 – Keshi level crossing disaster – At least 40 people were killed when a bus was hit by a diesel locomotive train in the outskirts of Ashgabat.

== Ukraine ==
- (Soviet Union) (Ukrainian Soviet Socialist Republic) 11 June 1989 – Kamenskaya Pogorelova level crossing disaster (Present day Dnipropetrovsk region) – An Adeler−Voronezh passenger train was hit by a local bus, which killed 31 and injured 14 people.
- (Ukraine) 12 October 2010 – Marhanets train accident – Marganets level crossing disaster. A train smashed into a passenger bus in Dnipropetrovsk Oblast, which killed 45 people with nine injured.

== United Kingdom ==
- (United Kingdom of Great Britain and Ireland) (England) 1832 – Leicester and Swannington Railway – Train hit horse and cart; one of the first ever level crossing accidents.
- (United Kingdom) (England) October 1859 – Petworth rail incident — A steam locomotive left with its regulator open, broke away from the yard at Petworth, W. Sussex, and ran loose for seventeen and a half miles (28.2 km) to Horsham, destroying three sets of level crossing gates, before being stopped by a cleaner. (Note: Until the 1950s, most level crossings in the United Kingdom had swinging gates, which were closed across the tracks when open to road traffic to prevent horses and livestock inadvertently escaping onto the railway. Lifting barriers have now mostly superseded swinging gates.)
- (United Kingdom) (England) 30 August 1926 – Naworth level crossing accident — 9 killed. A train struck a charabanc, which had been erroneously allowed on the level crossing.
- (United Kingdom) (England) 6 January 1968 – Hixon rail crash — 11 killed. An abnormal load (120-ton electrical transformer) was escorted across a recently installed AHB level crossing at Hixon, Staffordshire. Warning signs were not observed and the signaller was not telephoned before crossing, and an electric express hit the load and derailed. The train driver, a crew member and eight passengers were killed. As a result of the crash, AHB level crossings were improved.
- (United Kingdom) (England) 26 July 1986 – Lockington rail crash — Nine killed. A light van failed to stop at the warning lights (it had joined the road from a house next to the level crossing) at a recently installed AOCR level crossing at Lockington, E.R. Yorkshire. The van was broken into pieces, which moved under the train and derailed it. Eight passengers on the train and a passenger in the van died. As a result of the crash, AOCR level crossings (except one) were phased-out.
- (United Kingdom) (England) 6 November 2004 – Ufton Nervet rail crash — Seven killed. Mazda 323 (believed to be parked upon Ufton AHB level crossing by a suicidal driver) was hit by the 17:35 HST from London Paddington to Plymouth. The collision and a set of points at the Down Goods Loop caused all eight coaches to derail. The drivers of the train and car, and five rail passengers, were killed. As a result of the crash, level crossing safety as a whole was revolutionised and hundreds were closed in the following years.
- (United Kingdom) (England) October 2005 – Black Horse Drove — 1 killed in collision with tractor
- (United Kingdom) (England) 3 December 2005 – Elsenham pedestrian accident — 2 killed
- (United Kingdom) (England) 2007 – Wokingham, Berkshire — 1 killed
- (United Kingdom) (England) 2008 – Wokingham, Berkshire — 1 killed
- (United Kingdom) (Scotland) 2009 – Halkirk, Caithness — 3 killed
- (United Kingdom) (Wales) 2 September 2009 – Penrhyndeudraeth, Gwynedd – 1 killed
- (United Kingdom) (England) 2010 – Wokingham, Berkshire — 1 killed
- (United Kingdom) (England) 2010 – Little Cornard, Suffolk — 1 with life-threatening injuries
- (United Kingdom) (England) 2011 – Chorley – 1 killed, 1 serious injury
- (United Kingdom) (Scotland) 2012 – Dunragit – 1 serious injury
- (United Kingdom) (England) July 2012 – Pleasants Crossing, Denver — 1 killed
- (United Kingdom) (England) 2013 – Athelney, Somerset – 1 killed (car driver)
- (United Kingdom) (England) 2014 – Scampston, North Yorkshire – 1 killed
- (United Kingdom) (England) 2014 – Lincoln – 2 killed

== United States ==
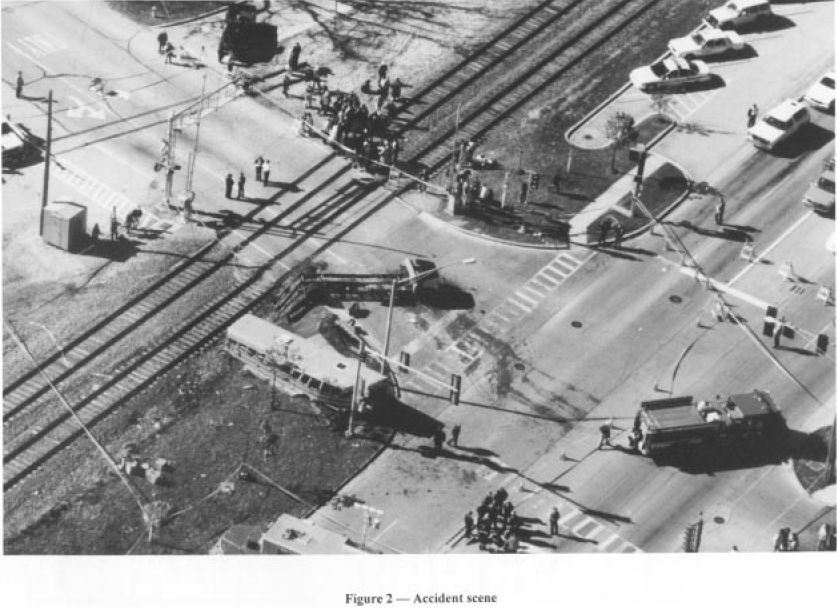
1995 Fox River Grove bus–train collision

- (United States) 30 July 1896 – 1896 Atlantic City rail crash - An excursion train crossing a diamond crossing in Atlantic City, New Jersey was struck by an approaching Reading Railroad train killing 50 people.
- (United States) 30 November 1921 – Proberta, California – A Southern Pacific passenger train collided with a school bus carrying high school students to Red Bluff, California, near Proberta. The tragic accident killed 14 students and seriously injured one other. There was a thick Tule fog across the Central Valley. Two school buses were on their way north to Red Bluff, full of students. They arrived at the train crossing in Proberta, amid the early morning fog. The first bus made it over the tracks, the second bus was struck by an oncoming train.
- (United States) 30 March 1923 – Columbus, Ohio – A westbound Four Flyer en route to Cincinnati from Boston hit an automobile at a grade crossing derailing almost the entire train. Six people were killed, three of them were the occupants of the car. The other three were the Engineer, the Fireman and an Ohio politician; another 14 were injured.
- (United States) 22 January 1927 – Round Rock, Texas - A bus carrying a Basketball team of Baylor University was hit by a train. Seven killed.
- (United States) 12 April 1930 – Albuquerque, New Mexico - Train-bus collision. 20 killed.
- (United States) 11 April 1935 – Rockville, Maryland – 14 killed. A Baltimore and Ohio Railroad express train struck a bus carrying students of Williamsport High School who were returning from a University of Maryland science fair. Accident occurred at (long closed) Baltimore Road crossing.
- (United States) 1 December 1938 – 1938 South Jordan train-bus collision – 23 children killed when a blizzard obscured an oncoming train at a crossing in Salt Lake County in what is now South Jordan, Utah.
- (United States) 27 August 1955 – Spring City, Tennessee - 11 killed, 36 injured. A 100-car train struck the rear of a Spring City Elementary School bus as it crossed the tracks.
- (United States) 14 December 1961 – Greeley, Colorado – The Union Pacific passenger train City of Denver hit a school bus carrying 38 students and the driver east of Evans, killing 20 children and injuring 17. It is the deadliest crash to occur in the state.
- 17 September 1963 – 1963 Chualar bus crash – 32 killed, 25 injured – A flatbed truck being used as a bus was hit by a freight train in Salinas Valley, California. It was the worst fatal vehicle accident in United States history, according to the National Safety Council.
- (United States) 24 March 1972 – Gilchrest Road, New York crossing accident – Five killed. A school bus did not yield at a level crossing and was struck by a Penn Central freight train.
- (United States) 30 July 1974 – Fibre, Michigan – Eight killed. A 1972 Oldsmobile station wagon, occupied by four children and four adults, collided with a Soo Line freight train at the Fibre Crossing, which did not have lights or gates installed.
- (United States) October 1977 – Plant City, Florida – 10 killed. Amtrak Passenger Train struck pickup truck that attempted to beat the train at a crossing. No injuries on the train.
- (United States) November 1977 - Delhi, Colorado - 0 killed. Amtrak's Southwest Limited #4, that departed Trinidad, Colorado, struck a truck at the Delhi crossing which features the wigwag signal. The truck was stolen and was deliberately parked on the tracks on purpose by an occupant and then got out to steal some railroad ties that were later used in a maintenance project. When the train hit the truck, it dragged it to a nearby switch, thus causing the train to derail.
- (United States) March 1982 – Mineola, New York – Nine killed, one injured. A passenger van drove around the crossing gate and was struck by a Long Island Rail Road train.
- (United States) August 1991 - Downers Grove, Illinois - 1 killed. A 41-year old woman, named Mary Theresa Wojtyla, was hit by a Metra commuter train that was going 60 mph taking passengers home from Chicago, Illinois. Mary was distracted by a recent divorce and was walking with her lawyer on her way to finish divorce papers. At the Fairview Avenue Station in Downers Grove, Illinois, she walked around the front of a Metra local stopped at the station, she ignored the crossing bells and gates and was hit by the train.
- (United States) 25 October 1995 – 1995 Fox River Grove bus–train collision – Seven killed. A school bus at a stop light overextended onto railroad tracks and was struck by a Metra train.
- (United States) 1999 – Bourbonnais train accident – An Amtrak train collided with a semi-truck and derailed most of the train. 11 killed.
- (United States) 28 March 2000 – Polk County, Tennessee – Three killed, CSX freight train strikes a school bus at an unsignalled crossing.
- (United States) 2005 – Glendale train crash – 11 killed. A southbound Metrolink train hit a SUV that had been parked on the tracks immediately south of the Chevy Chase Drive level crossing, colliding with a northbound Metrolink train and a freight train parked on nearby auxiliary tracks.
- (United States) 16 October 2007 – Greer, South Carolina - An Amtrak train struck a vehicle that was stranded at a grade crossing. The incident was caught on police dashcam. The officer rushed the driver away from the vehicle before it was struck and caught fire. One Amtrak passenger was injured and two others required oxygen.
- (United States) 2008 – Oxnard, California – Amtrak Passenger Train struck a truck. Truck was smashed; however no injuries were reported.
- (United States) 2009 – Canton, Michigan crash – Five killed when the driver of a car drove around lowered railroad crossing gates and was struck in a "T-bone" manner by a westbound Wolverine train. No injuries on the train. The driver had his license suspended the day before.
- (United States) May 2008 – Revere, Massachusetts – Boy killed by "second train coming" on MBTA.
- (United States) 1 March 2010 – Detroit, Michigan – An Amtrak train struck a fire engine owned by the Detroit Fire Department on the city's southwest side.
- 15 November 2012 – Midland train crash – A Union Pacific freight train collided with a flatbed truck that was part of a parade in Midland, Texas honoring veterans of the United States Armed Forces. Four veterans were killed, while none onboard the train were hurt.
- (United States) 3 February 2015 – Valhalla train crash – A Metro-North train collided with an SUV at a crossing at Valhalla, New York, resulting in six deaths and at least 12 injuries.
- (United States) 24 February 2015 – 2015 Oxnard train derailment – One died, 29 injured. A Metrolink passenger train collided with a truck on a grade crossing and derailed at Oxnard, California.
- (United States) 9 March 2015 – 2015 Halifax train crash – An Amtrak passenger train collided with an oversize load on a grade crossing and derailed at Halifax, North Carolina. Fifty-five people were injured.
- (United States) May 17, 2015 – Atlanta, Georgia – A CSX freigh train collided with a MARTA bus. 6 people were injured.
- (United States) 21 January 2017 – Salt Lake City, Utah - A FedEx double-trailer semi truck was struck by a Frontrunner passenger train. A UTA maintenance worker disabled the crossing signals to fix a malfunction before the incident occurred; the truck driver was never warned of the oncoming train. The incident was caught on dashcam by a nearby police officer. No injuries were reported.
- (United States) 31 January 2018 – 2018 Crozet, Virginia train crash - A train carrying members of Congress from the Republican Party from Washington, D.C. to a retreat in White Sulphur Springs, West Virginia crashed into a garbage truck at a level crossing near Crozet, Virginia, killing the garbage truck driver.
- (United States) 26 February 2019 – Westbury, New York - Two separate Long Island Railroad trains hit a pickup truck causing the train to derail and damage the nearby LIRR platform. Three people are killed with another seven injured. Service on the Port Jefferson Branch and Ronkonkoma Branch was suspended between Hicksville and Mineola the following day.
- (United States) 29 August 2021 – Luling, Texas – A Union Pacific train hit an 18-wheeler truck carrying a wind turbine blade around 2:30p.m. at the intersection of U.S. Route 90 and U.S. Route 183. The turbine caused damage to the railroad crossing signal controller, a utility pole, and a nearby commercial building.
- (United States) 27 June 2022 – 2022 Missouri train derailment - An Amtrak train hit a dump truck at a rural railroad crossing marked only by crossbucks and stop signs, derailing all passenger cars. Four killed, including one person in the dump truck, and approximately 150 injured.
- (United States) 20 December 2022 – Collegedale, Tennessee - A Norfolk Southern train hits a semi-truck carrying a 134-foot concrete truss bridge beam and derailed, 2 crew members injured.
- (United States) 4 April 2023 – Redlands, California - An Arrow passenger DMU train struck a vehicle at a grade crossing at the intersection of Alabama Street and Redlands Blvd. The vehicle stopped on the tracks as the gates lowered. An 11-year-old was killed at the scene and her mother had also died of injuries two days later.
- (United States) 12 April 2023 – Hollywood, Florida - A Brightline train slammed into car carrier trailer that stuck on the railway tracks near at the intersection of Dixie Highway and Washington Street during torrential rainfall.
- (United States) 8 August 2023 – Austell, Georgia - A flatbed tractor-trailer was stuck in traffic before being struck by a Norfolk Southern freight train. No injuries were reported.
- (United States) 23 September 2023 – Plant City, Florida - An SUV was struck by a CSX train at an unsignalled crossing which killed the driver and five of the passengers, including three children, and injured another passenger.
- (United States) 13 August 2024 – Stuarts Draft, Virginia - A van was struck by a Norfolk Southern train, three people died and another was injured.
- (United States) 12 September 2024 - Goose Creek, South Carolina - A truck carrying a M109 howitzer was struck by a CSX Transportation freight train. No injuries were reported.
- (United States) 18 December 2024 - Pecos, Texas - A Union Pacific train struck a tractor trailer carrying an oversized load and derailed, killing both crew members on the train and injuring three others. Some cars of the derailed train also crashed into the nearby Chamber of Commerce building.
- (United States) 28 December 2024 - Delray Beach, Florida - A fire engine was traveling eastbound on S.E. 1st Street to a structure fire, where Brightline train collided with a firetruck around 10:45 a.m. The driver said that he did not see the oncoming Brightline train as he drove into its path. 15 passengers were injured after the collision.
- (United States) 9 April, 2025 - Canton, Massachusetts - An MBTA commuter train collides with a tractor trailer at the railroad crossing on Pine Street at 1:40 p.m.
- (United States) 2 November 2025 – Schertz, Texas – A Union Pacific train collided with an 18-wheeler carrying a full load of cars around 10 a.m. at the intersection of Schertz Parkway and Farm-to-Market 78, after truck being stuck on the railroad tracks.
- (United States) 27 March 2026 - Wiggins, Mississippi - A Canadian Pacific Kansas City train struck a van, killing five people on board the van and injuring another.
- (United States) 26 April 2026 - Grand Bay, Alabama - Amtrak train No. 23 was traveling from Mobile, AL, to New Orleans at approximately 7:20 a.m. (CT) when a semi-trailer carrying van stuck on the CSX tracks south of Mobile.
- (United States) 14 May 2026 - Chesapeake, Virginia - A Norfolk Southern freight train crashed into a septic truck on a railroad crossing at the 2900 block of Yadkin Road within the southeast Virginia city. The truck driver was injured.
- (United States) 25 June 2026 - Rosedale, Maryland - A CSX-operated freight train collided with truck around 7:30 a.m. at the private crossing. No injuries reported.
- (United States) 26 June 2026 - Atlanta, Georgia - A CSX train collided with a semi-truck around 3:45 a.m near at Lee Street and Sparks Street in southwest Atlanta, sparking a fire that engulfed the truck's cab.

== Uruguay ==
- (Uruguay) 21 May 1956 – Young crossing crash – At Young, a train crashed into a bus that was travelling to Salto. Unknown number killed, reportedly between two and 30.

== Vietnam ==
- 10 March 2015 – Dien Sanh train crash – A Vietnam Railways passenger train collided with a lorry near Dien Sanh station. One person was killed and several people were injured, four seriously.

== Zaire ==
- (Zaire) 3 July 1987 – Kasumbalesa level crossing disaster – A passenger train smashed into a trailer truck carrying local residents in Katanga Province, which killed 125 people. (present day of Democratic Republic of Congo)

== Zimbabwe ==
- (Zimbabwe) 8 March 2007 – 35 die and an unknown number were injured when a train hit in a bus near Harare.
- (Zimbabwe) 16 June 2026 – A freight train collided with a bus in Triangle, killing nine and injuring 25.

== See also ==
- Lists of rail accidents
- List of road accidents
