= Hectorspruit level crossing accident =

2012 transport incident in South Africa

Coordinates: 25°27′3″S 31°39′39″E

Details
- Date: 13 July 2012; 07:00
- Location: Hectorspruit, Mpumalanga
- Country: South Africa
- Operator: Transnet
- Incident type: Level crossing accident

Statistics
- Trains: 1
- Deaths: 25 or 26

The Hectorspruit level crossing accident occurred at approximately 7 a.m. on 13 July 2012, when a Witbank to Maputo coal train collided with a truck on a controlled level crossing near Hectorspruit, Mpumalanga, South Africa.

== Crash ==
The truck was carrying 44 seasonal farm workers engaged mainly in picking citrus crops in the region. There were 25 or 26 fatalities among the truck's occupants, and several others were injured. Immediately after the collision, the truck was dragged by the train for about 200 metres (660 ft); bodies were left scattered on the ground, with limbs missing.

On the same day, the Minister for Public Enterprises, Malusi Gigaba, and Transnet officials visited the collision scene, on the line between Malelane and Hectorspruit. They were satisfied that all level crossing safety measures were in place at the time of the crash. According to one official, the train driver "even hooted to let the [truck] driver know that he was approaching".

== Investigation & trial ==
The South African cabinet sent its condolences to the families of the victims. Additionally, senior government officials visited them to offer their support. Most of the families could not afford to bury their loved ones without assistance. "These are really poor families and it is incumbent upon government to show the necessary care and to support these families with all the means to ensure that the funeral of their children is conducted in a befitting manner", said Mr Gigaba.

The driver of the truck, George Mandlazi, 32, was arrested immediately after being treated and discharged from hospital. He was charged with 25 counts of murder. Witnesses claimed that Mandlazi had failed to stop at the level crossing.

When Mandlazi first appeared in court, the charges against him were reduced from murder to culpable homicide, and he was remanded in police custody to allow him time to get a legal representative. Murder charges were reinstated on 17 July 2012, when Mandlazi appeared in court again, and was denied bail. At his trial on 12 November 2013, he pleaded guilty on 24 counts of culpable homicide and one count of negligent driving. His bail of 3,000 South African rand ($295, €220, or £185 as of November 2013) was extended, with sentencing scheduled for February 2014. In February 2014 his sentencing was postponed until June 2014. He was sentenced to seven years in jail on 25 June 2014 in the Nelspruit circuit of the High Court in Pretoria.

The judge said Mandlazi was very reckless by ignoring two warning signs before the railway crossing and also failed to heed the train's horn.

== See also ==
- Faure level crossing accident
- List of level crossing accidents
- List of rail accidents (2010–2019)
