= 1973 Kecskemét level crossing disaster =

Transport incident in Hungary

Coordinates: 46°50′00″N 19°37′00″E

The 1973 Kecskemét level crossing disaster occurred at Kecskemét, Hungary on January 30, 1973. A commuter train smashed into a regular route bus which was weaving around the half boom barriers.

At least thirty-seven people were killed and eighteen people were injured.

== Special circumstances ==
Most of the trains on this line are stopping trains, and as the platform was located within the warning zone of the level crossing, the warning times were necessarily longer than would be the case of a level crossing located away from any station, say 90 seconds instead of 30 seconds.

Local drivers knew this and many came to the conclusion that it would do no harm to weave around the barriers for the first period of warning.

On the day of the accident, a train was running that did not conform to the normal pattern. It ran express without stopping at the station, so that the warning time was reduced to the standard 30 seconds. Some road traffic including the bus assumed that the longer 90 second warning time still applied, and was thus caught out when this did not apply.

== Level crossing predictors ==
Ideally the level crossing warning times should be the same for all trains. This can be implemented with so-called predictor circuits which are made by a number of manufacturers. However predictors have certain limitations; they cannot always be installed where there is complicated pointwork, and sometimes where the lines are electrified. It may also be possible that the type of predictor available in 1973, and which may have had to be bought with hard currency, were less able to handle these problems.

== See also ==
- List of level crossing accidents
