= 1972 in rail transport =

This article lists events related to rail transport that occurred in 1972.

== Events ==
=== January events ===
- January – General Motors Electro-Motive Division introduces the EMD SD40-2.
- January 31 – Deficit 83 Lines movement: Last day of passenger operation on a 3.5 km (2.2 mi) section of the Hososhima Line in Miyazaki, Japan

=== February events ===
- February 5 – Last steam locomotive built in India, Class YG #3573 at Chittaranjan Locomotive Works.

=== March events ===
- March 15 – First phase of the San'yo Shinkansen opens between Shin-Osaka Station and Okayama Station.
- March 20 – Penn Central Railroad abandons passenger service on the Harlem Line from Dover Plains to Chatham, as well as three stations in the South Bronx, and one station in White Plains, although that one was replaced. Service to Grand Central Terminal ended in the middle of the day, leaving stranded passengers with no scheduled return trip to Chatham, forcing them to only go as far north as Dover Plains.
- March 24 – The Gilchrest Road crossing accident occurred on a level crossing in Clarkstown, New York, Five people were killed, and 44 injured.
- March 30 – The Milwaukee Road discontinues its Limburger Special service to New Glarus, Wisconsin.
- March 31 – Official last day of steam locomotive operation on Statens Järnvägar, Sweden.

=== April events ===
- April – The Pacific Great Eastern Railway changes its name to British Columbia Railway.
- April 1 – The Central Railroad of New Jersey (CNJ) pulls out of the Commonwealth of Pennsylvania, becoming a terminal road in New Jersey; this does not affect their Lehigh and New England Railway operations, however. The Lehigh Valley Railroad assumes operation of the former CNJ lines in Pennsylvania.
- April 30 – British Rail suspends operation of the Brighton Belle passenger train between London and Brighton, England.

=== June events ===
- June 1 – The Metropolitan Transportation Authority (MTA) leases the Harlem Line south of Dover Plains, New York, from Penn Central. Freight service continues to operate by Penn Central north of Dover Plains to Chatham until 1976, and to Millerton by Conrail until 1980.
- June 6 – Amtrak introduces the Night Owl passenger train on an overnight schedule between Washington, D.C., and Boston, Massachusetts.
- June 11 – Eltham Well Hall rail crash: A British Rail excursion train from Margate to Kentish Town derails at Eltham Well Hall station in the London suburb of Eltham taking a sharp curve at excessive speed. The driver (who is found to have been intoxicated) and five passengers are killed.
- June 16 – 108 die as two passenger trains hit the debris of a collapsed railway tunnel near Soissons, France.
- June 19 – Deficit 83 Lines movement: Closure of a 34.9 km (21.7 mi) section of the JNR Sassho Line between Shin-Totsukawa and Ishikari-Numata in Hokkaido, Japan
- June 30 – Toei Subway Line 6 (present-day Mita Line) is extended from Sugamo to Hibiya in Tokyo, Japan.

=== July events ===
- July 21 – A collision between two trains near Sevilla, Spain kills 76 people.

=== August events ===
- August 1 – FEVE opens 58 km (36 mi) of metre-gauge railway between Luarca and Vegadeo, completing 321 km (199 mi) between Ferrol and Gijón along the north coast of Spain.
- August 10 – The Illinois Central Railroad and the Gulf, Mobile and Ohio Railroad merge to form the Illinois Central Gulf Railroad.

=== September events ===
- September 11 – Revenue service begins on the Bay Area Rapid Transit (BART) system in the San Francisco Bay Area.
- September 18 – São Paulo Metro is inaugurated.
- September 27 – Commemorating the opening of Bay Area Rapid Transit (BART) two weeks earlier, United States President Richard Nixon rides a BART train.

=== October events ===
- October 6 – A train crash at Saltillo, Mexico kills 208 people.
- October 10 – The Tokyo Metro Chiyoda Line extension to Yoyogi-Kōen station is opened.
- October 20 – The Public Transport Commission of New South Wales is formed, replacing the New South Wales Government Railways.
- October 30
  - The driver of a fast train does not notice a stop signal due to heavy fog and collides with another train in Schweinsburg-Culten, East Germany. 22 die and 70 are injured.
  - Illinois Central Gulf commuter rail crash: The accidental tripping of a signal at 27th Street Station on the Metra Electric system in Chicago, Illinois, causes an IC Electric express train to telescope another, killing 45 and injuring over 300.

=== December events ===
- December 15 – Amtrak introduces the Vacationer passenger train service between New York City and Miami, Florida.
- December 16 – Yokohama Municipal Subway, part of section between Isezaki-chojamachi and Kamiooka, officially opens.

=== Unknown date events ===
- The Chicago, St. Paul, Minneapolis and Omaha Railway is officially merged into the Chicago and North Western Railway railroad.
- Donald Russell steps down as Chairman of the Board of Directors of the Southern Pacific Company, the parent company of the Southern Pacific Railroad. The position remains vacant until 1976.
- General Motors Electro-Motive Division introduces computer control systems in its line of diesel locomotives with the EMD SD40-2.
- Fred Burbidge succeeds Ian David Sinclair as president of Canadian Pacific Railway.
- The Family Lines System is formed as a common marketing strategy of several eastern and southeastern United States railroads.
