= 1938 South Jordan train-bus collision =

Grade crossing collision in South Jordan, Utah

1938 South Jordan rail crossing disaster

Details
- Date: December 1, 1938; 87 years ago 8:43 am
- Location: South Jordan, Utah
- Coordinates: 40°33′58″N 111°54′02″W
- Country: United States
- Line: Denver and Rio Grande Western Railroad
- Incident type: Collision

Statistics
- Bus: 1
- Trains: 1
- Deaths: 24
- Injured: 16

The 1938 South Jordan rail crossing disaster in Utah was a collision between a school bus and a train at a level crossing resulting in the deaths of 24 people, 23 of whom were students on their way to school. The accident is the basis for an urban legend in San Antonio, Texas.

== Accident ==
On the morning of December 1, 1938, a school bus being driven by Farrold Silcox was headed toward Jordan High School. The weather that morning created a thick fog which decreased visibility immensely. As the bus prepared to cross the grade, a freight train called "The Flying Ute" was approaching, carrying 80 cars and traveling at 50 miles per hour. By the time the engineer saw the bus, there wasn't enough time for the brakes to adequately slow the train.

The ensuing collision killed 24 on the bus, including Silcox. 16 students managed to survive the crash, but with serious injuries. It is the worst railroad crossing accident involving a school bus in U.S. history.

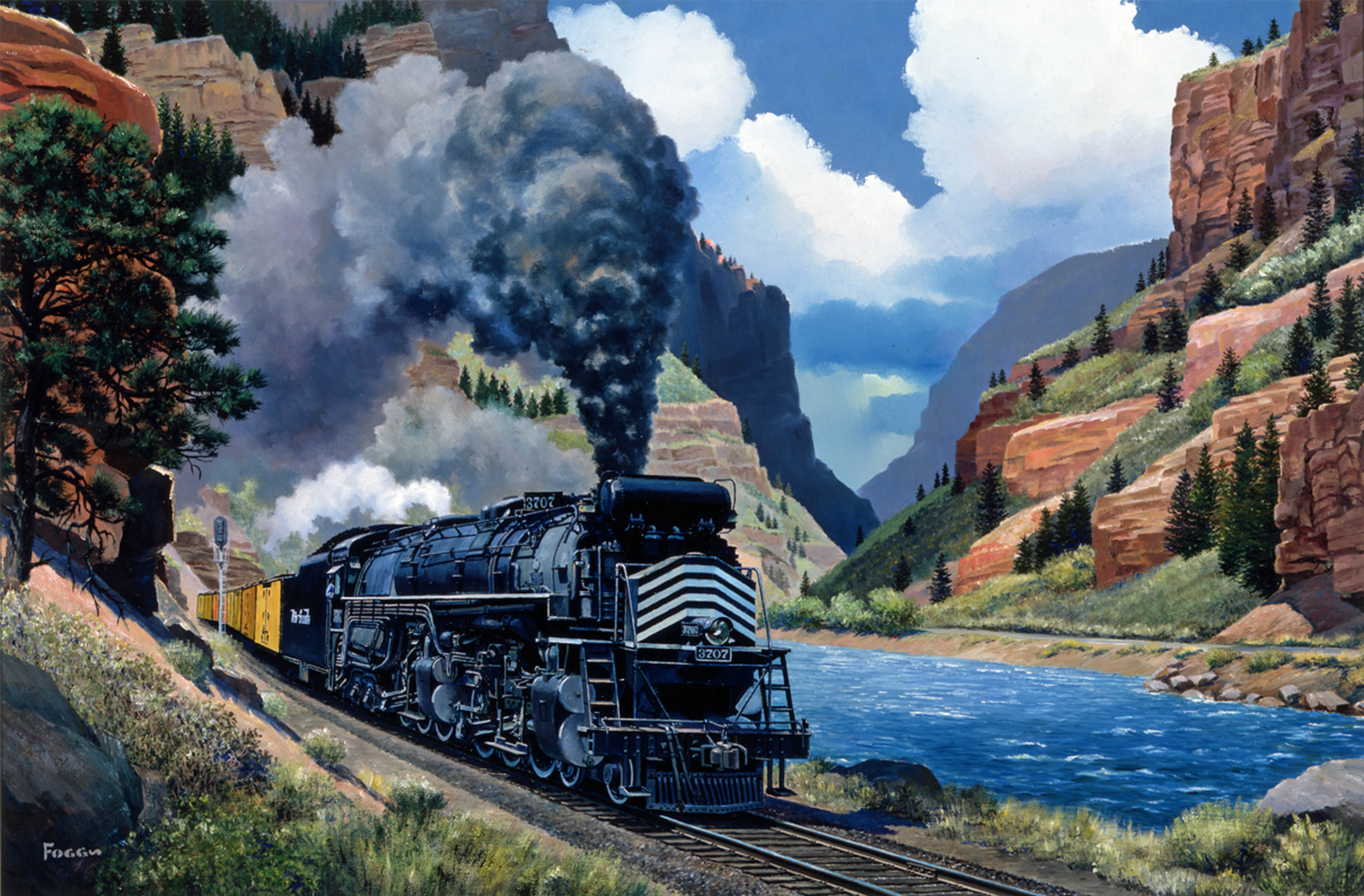
A Howard Fogg painting of a Denver & Rio Grande Western Challenger locomotive, almost exactly similar to 3708, the engine involved in the collision.

A memorial was erected nearby at South Jordan Cemetery to commemorate the accident. The plaque lists the names of all of those killed in the collision.

== See also ==
- Gilchrest Road, New York, crossing accident, a similar incident involving a school bus driver attempting to beat a level crossing.
- 1995 Fox River Grove bus–train collision, a similar incident involving a school bus driver that was unaware that the bus' rear was positioned in the path of an express train.
