= 1995 Fox River Grove bus–train collision =

Grade crossing collision in Fox River Grove, Illinois

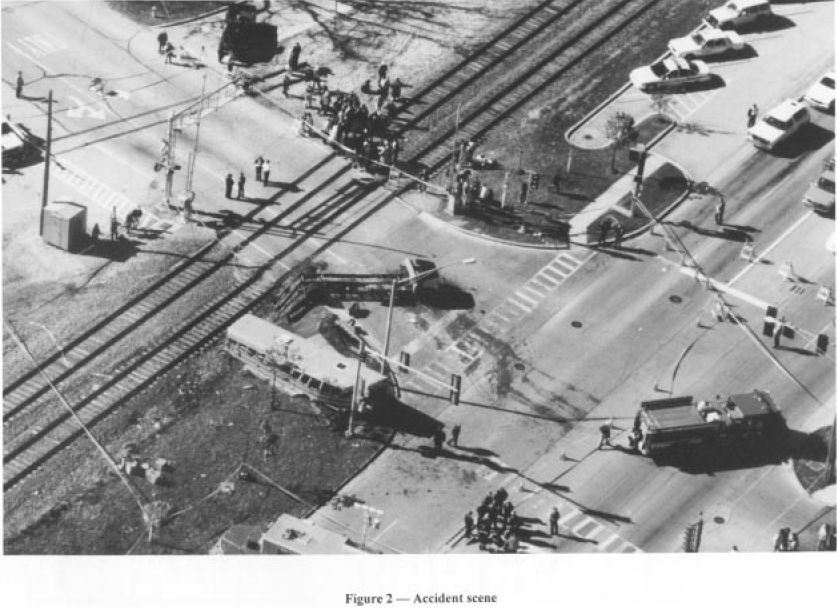
- NTSB photograph of the accident scene

Details
- Date: October 25, 1995; 30 years ago 7:10 am
- Location: Fox River Grove, Illinois
- Coordinates: 42°11′49.2″N 88°13′04.0″W
- Country: United States
- Line: Union Pacific Northwest Line (Harvard Subdivision)
- Operator: Union Pacific
- Owner: Union Pacific (railline); Metra (rolling stock)
- Incident type: Collision
- Cause: Bus driver misjudgement Traffic signal timing

Statistics
- Bus: 1
- Trains: 1
- Passengers: 35 (school bus); 120 (Metra train)
- Crew: 1 (school bus); 3 (Metra train)
- Deaths: 7
- Injured: 24

The 1995 Fox River Grove bus–train collision was a grade crossing collision that killed seven students riding aboard a school bus in Fox River Grove, Illinois, on the morning of October 25, 1995. The school bus, driven by a substitute driver, who was also the trainer of bus drivers in the district, was stopped at a traffic light with the rearmost portion extending onto a portion of the railroad tracks when it was struck by a Metra Union Pacific Northwest Line train, train 624 en route to Chicago.

The crash involved a signaled rail crossing located very near a highway intersection which was regulated by traffic signals. The devices were connected and operations were supposed to be carefully timed and coordinated. Such locations are known as "interconnected crossings" within the industries. Highway and railroad officials had each received numerous complaints from the public about the insufficient timing of the warnings provided by the signals in the year prior to the crash, and citizens later told of situations with vehicles unable to clear the tracks in a timely manner.

The National Transportation Safety Board (NTSB) investigation found that, while the bus driver was not aware that a portion of the bus was on the tracks as she should have been, the timing of signals was so insufficient that, even if she had identified the hazard as the train approached, she would have had to proceed against a red traffic signal into the highway intersection to have moved out of the train's path.

Legislation and re-engineering of interconnected crossings across the state of Illinois combined with greater awareness elsewhere resulted in efforts to help to prevent similar crashes from recurring. Informational decals were also added to Illinois school buses advising drivers of the length of each bus, since the substitute school bus driver was apparently unaware of the exact length of the bus she was driving. Other states have also embraced that and related aspects and incorporated them into their school bus driver training curriculum.

The Fox River Grove crash stands as the worst crash involving a Metra train in its history, and one of the worst grade crossing crashes in U.S. history. At the crash site, the improved signaling system installed after the crash now protects the passing trains and motor vehicle traffic. Nearby is a small memorial to the seven high school students killed in the crash.

== Collision ==
On October 25, 1995, at 7:10 a.m., train 624 collided with the back of a school bus carrying students to Cary-Grove High School. The collision occurred at the intersection of Algonquin Road, U.S. Route 14, and a double-tracked mainline belonging to the Union Pacific Railroad. At the time of the accident, the Metra train was traveling at approximately 60 miles per hour (97 km/h).

The impact separated the body from the chassis of the bus and catapulted the wreckage into the intersection. Five students were killed during the collision and two later died from their injuries. Another 24 bus passengers were injured, some critically, and four passengers were not injured. Most victims suffered blunt trauma and head injuries. The most seriously injured suffered skull fractures, lacerations and internal injuries. None of the three train crew or approximately 120 train passengers were injured.

== Vehicles involved ==
Metra train 624, nicknamed "The Flyer" consisted of Metra Pullman-Standard bilevel "Gallery" cab car no. 8751 (Ex-C&NW no. 252) six Pullman-Standard bilevel "Gallery" passenger railcars and Metra F40PH locomotive number 148, owned by Metra and operated by Union Pacific.

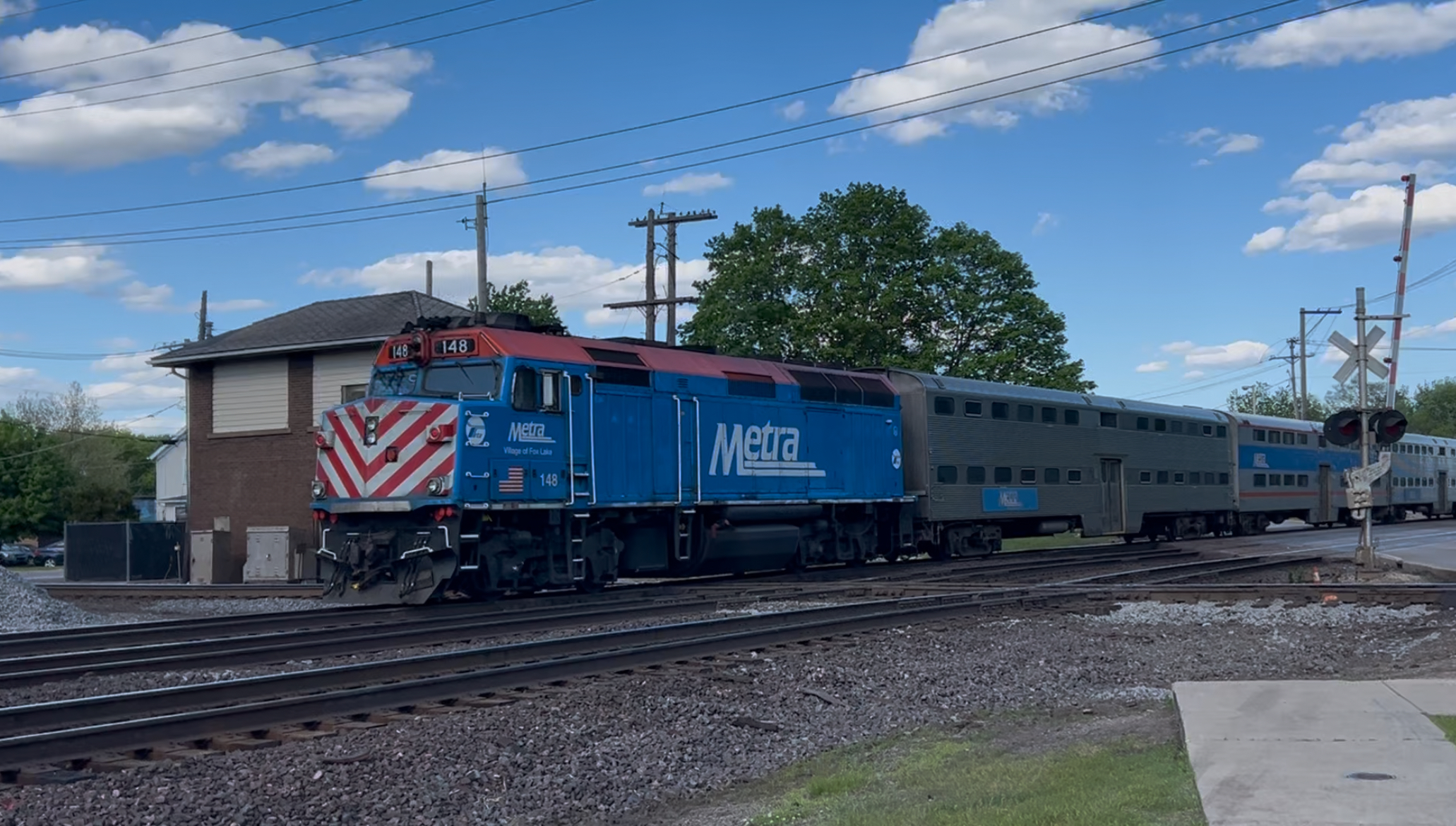
Metra 148, seen in West Chicago Illinois on May 10, 2026.

The train was in push mode, with the engineer operating the locomotive from the cab car at the front of the train, and the locomotive pushing the train from the rear. Unlike most double-tracked railroads in the United States, Metra routes operated by Union Pacific run on the left. Train 624 departed on-time from Crystal Lake station at 7:00 am bound for North Western Station in downtown Chicago. After the train departed Crystal Lake, it bypassed Cary station as it was an express train, before increasing speed to 70 mph (110 km/h).

The school bus involved in the accident was a 71-passenger school bus built by American Transportation Company (which was acquired by Navistar International at the time of the accident), and was owned and operated by School Districts 47 and 155 through a Transportation Joint Agreement. At the time of the accident, 35 students were on board. The driver was a substitute driver that was normally the assistant transportation director for the districts. The driver had not driven the route before on a bus, and had not crossed the railroad crossing in a school bus or personal vehicle.

== Casualties ==
The following people lost their lives in the disaster:

1. Jeffrey J. Clark (16)
2. Stephanie L. Fulham (15)
3. Susanna Guzman (18)
4. Michael B. Hoffman (14)
5. Joseph A. Kalte (16)
6. Shawn P. Robinson (14)
7. Tiffany L. Schneider (15)

Of the seven fatalities, five of the victims were buried in separate graves at Windridge Memorial Park and Nature Sanctuary in Cary, Illinois, one victim was interred at Memory Gardens Cemetery and one victim was interred at Shalom Memorial Park; both cemeteries are located in Arlington Heights, Illinois.

== Timeline ==
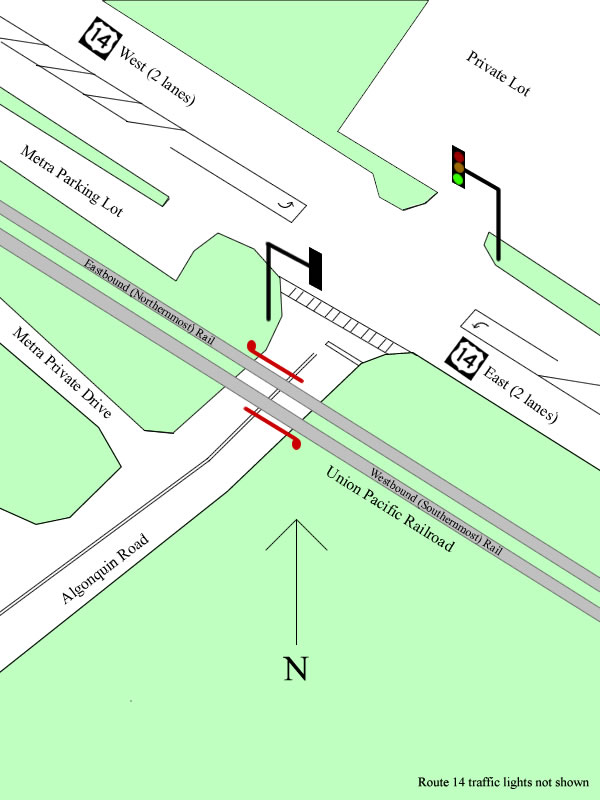
General diagram of the scene. The train approached from the west, while the bus was stopped on the north side of the tracks

All times are approximate, given in the National Transportation Safety Board (NTSB) report as the best approximation of when the events occurred as a result of their investigation. All times are given in Central Daylight Time.

- 6:15 am: Bus scheduled to leave bus garage.
- 6:30 am: Substitute bus driver arrives to perform pretrip inspection.
- 6:35 am: School bus leaves garage.
- 6:55 am: First passengers are picked up on bus route.
- 7:00 am: Metra express commuter train 624 leaves the Crystal Lake station, bound for downtown Chicago.
- 32 seconds before impact: The crossing processor detects the presence of the Metra train. The thumbwheel on the device calculates the speed of the train, which is at this point 66 mph (106 km/h). The train is 3,080 ft (939 m) from the center of the crossing. The device determines that it can safely wait eight seconds to notify the highway system of the train's approach.
- 24 seconds before impact: Rail system notifies the highway system of the train's approach. The train is 2,400 ft (732 m) from the crossing, and its speed is unchanged.
- 23 seconds before impact: Preemption cycle for the traffic signal begins; lights on U.S. 14 prepare to change to red, but pedestrian traffic must be given time to clear the intersection. The engineer first sees the school bus crossing the south (outbound) track at "a very slow speed." The train is now 2,300 ft (701 m) from the crossing.
- 12 seconds before impact: The pedestrian clearing phase ends, and the traffic signals for U.S. 14 turn yellow. The train is 1,200 ft (366 m) from the crossing. Its speed has increased to 69 mph (111 km/h), just short of the speed limit on that section of track.
- 7.5 seconds before impact: Signals on U.S. 14 turn from yellow to red.
- 6.0 seconds before impact: Signals on U.S. 14 end their "all red" interval, and signals for the bus turn green. The train is now 600 ft (183 m) from the crossing, traveling 67 mph (108 km/h)
- 5.0 seconds before impact: The engineer, realizing the bus has not moved from the track, activates the emergency brakes. The train is 500 ft (152 m) from the crossing, and its speed has decreased to 60 mph (97 km/h).
- 7:10 am: Train impacts school bus.
- 7:13 am: First 911 calls are reported to the Cary Police Department. The Fox River Grove police chief had witnessed the collision and immediately radioed for assistance.
- 7:18 am: First responders from Fox River Grove arrive on scene with an ambulance, a fire truck, and four EMTs.
- 7:27 am: Local hospital activates disaster plan, and sends two doctors to the scene.

== Causes ==
=== Failure of judgment ===
The initial cause of the crash was the failure of the bus driver to properly judge the distance between the railroad tracks when the vehicle stopped at a traffic signal across the tracks. The failure of judgment meant that around 3 inches (76 mm) of the back end of the bus protruded over the nearest rail. The body of the Metra train protruded 3 feet (1 m) past the rail. All of the injuries were sustained during this initial impact.

The crossing was of inherently dangerous design, in that a long vehicle could be partially trapped on the crossing while held by a red light at the intersection. If the driver had realized the danger, she would still have been forced to pull through a red light to clear the track when the warning bells sounded.

Children began joking that the driver, Patricia Catencamp, was oblivious to the fact that a crossing gate lowered on the bus, then started screaming for her to move forward. She did not understand their message and diverted her attention away from the traffic signal. The NTSB concluded that the traffic signal turned green six seconds before impact, but Catencamp was distracted, trying to attend to what she presumed was a crisis within the bus.

=== Highway modified ===
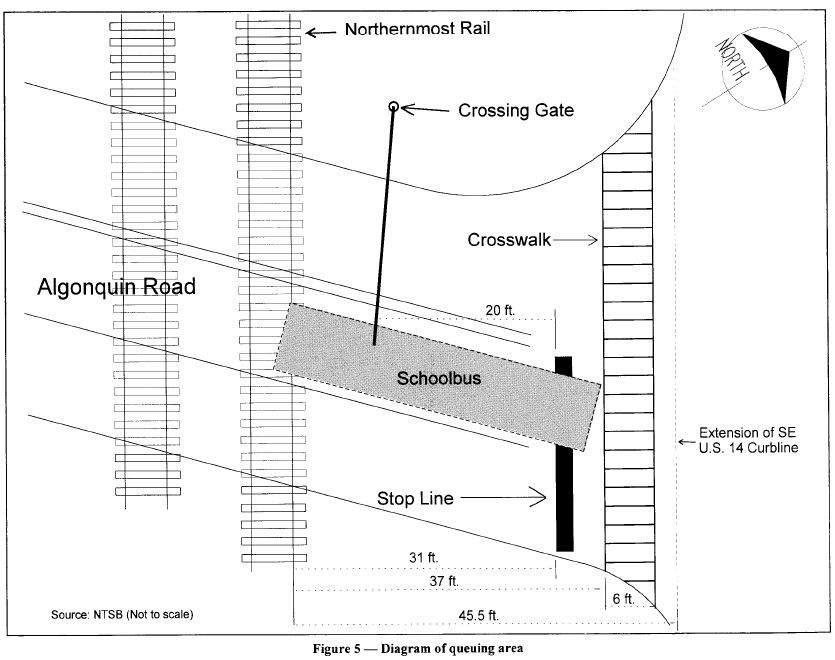
The position of the bus when it was hit by the train. The driver was unaware that the position of her bus was unsafe

As with most transportation crashes, there were other conditions present that created an environment in which this type of collision could occur. These causes take root in the history of the road, the railroad, and the crossing.

Prior to the early 1990s, the Northwest Highway ran as a two-lane road (one lane in each direction) parallel to the former Chicago & North Western rail line (Union Pacific Railroad after April 1995). The distance between the road and the railroad is relatively constant in the state—roughly 60 feet (18 m), assuming a two-lane road and impediment-free alignment. This distance was more than enough to hold a 40 feet (12 m) bus.

When the Illinois Department of Transportation (IDOT) modified the highway, three lanes were added to the road to create a four-lane highway with turn lanes at the intersection. To limit the impact of the road expansion to businesses on the northern side of the highway, IDOT reduced the distance between the road and the railroad from 60 feet to around 30 feet (9.1 m). They also erected a modernized traffic signal to ensure traffic cleared the crossing in front of an approaching train. These actions increased the chances of a train impacting a school bus, but were not leading causes.

=== Crossing design ===
The type of crossing where the crash occurred is known as an interconnected crossing because of the need to link the railroad signals to the road signals to ensure safe passage. On this particular route, bus drivers on Algonquin Road had been known to cross the tracks to stop at the line at Northwest Highway, leaving them vulnerable to passing trains if they happened to still be stopped when the gates lowered. In addition, vehicle sensors were only present on the north side of the railroad tracks. Buses, trucks and other large vehicles were forced to pull through the railroad crossing in order to activate the signals at the intersection.

=== Improper preemption programming ===
According to tests conducted by the National Transportation Safety Board, the warning lights on the railroad crossing activated 20 seconds before the arrival of the Metra train. However, the traffic light clearing the rail intersection only allowed cars to clear 18 seconds after the railway signals activated, giving vehicles only two to six seconds to clear the tracks. Roadway signal timing was under the jurisdiction of IDOT, while railway timing was under the jurisdiction of Union Pacific. No communication took place between both parties with regards to interconnected signal timing.

It was reported that the road signals had originally given a safe margin, but had been modified some months previously to allow a pedestrian crossing cycle, overlooking the possible consequences at the railroad crossing. The traffic signal would rest in the "WALK" indication for pedestrians during the morning commute period. When a train is detected, the pedestrian interval must be ended. This process used up 12 seconds of warning time as the train approached. Pedestrian volumes at this crosswalk were extremely light, according to a survey conducted by the Village of Fox River Grove in May 1996. IDOT traffic engineers responsible for establishing signal timings should have recognized that in this particular case, resting in "WALK" carries substantial risk and virtually no benefit, and should not have allowed the traffic signal to rest in the pedestrian "WALK" interval. If the traffic signals had not been serving the non-existent pedestrian, the bus would have had a green light 12 seconds earlier than it did, and the collision would almost certainly have been avoided.

In addition, the thumbwheel setting on the crossing processor was reduced to 25 seconds from 30 seconds two weeks before the crash. Union Pacific officials stated that the new value was still above the minimum constant warning time of 20 seconds.

== Litigation ==
Lawsuits were filed the month after the crash, and the last of these was resolved in January 2004. A total of $27.3 million was paid to the victims; of this amount, the school district paid $16.26 million, as school districts are held responsible for the actions of their drivers. The Union Pacific Railroad and Metra paid $7 million. Engineering contractors and the Illinois Department of Transportation settled for $3.2 million and $750,000, respectively.

== Consequences ==
=== NTSB recommendations ===
The National Transportation Safety Board issued 29 distinct recommendations to 17 distinct parties in the aftermath of the crash. These recommendations are summarized as follows:

To the U.S. Secretary of Transportation: Develop a safety inspection program for railroad crossings that involve other public entities (schools and other state departments). Notify, in cooperation with AASHTO, other agencies about the importance of exchanging information about railroad/highway crossings. Develop a common glossary of railroad/highway crossing terms and distribute to railroad and public entities. Develop a training program specifically regarding interconnected crossings. Require recording devices on all interconnected crossings in the future, and require their usage when both railroad and joint maintenance is done on the crossing. Upgrade existing recording devices to fulfill the previous condition.

To the Federal Highway Administration: Develop a way to visually show on pavement where a train and/or its cargo may be to assist drivers in determining their safe distance from the crossing. Develop, with the cooperation of National Highway Traffic Safety Administration and Operation Lifesaver, educational materials to inform motorists of how a train and/or its cargo can occupy a crossing. Review the national Highway-Rail Crossing inventory with the Federal Railroad Administration to ensure that it meets the needs of highway users as well.

To the Federal Railroad Administration: Update the national Highway-Rail Crossing inventory. Include, at a minimum, grade crossings having pre-emptive or interconnected signals.

To the National Highway Traffic Safety Administration: Determine what effect sound attenuation materials in buses have on the ability of the bus driver to discern both internal and external audible warnings.

To the Illinois Department of Transportation: Review all interconnected crossings in Illinois, and ensure that vehicles at all of these crossings have enough space or time to clear the crossing when a train approaches. Train subcontractors to ensure they have proper knowledge of all working interconnected systems.

To the Transportation Joint School District 47/155: Develop a program to identify possible hazards on all bus routes. Review the information with both regular and substitute bus drivers regularly.

To the National Association of State Directors of Pupil Transportation Services: Advise their members of the accident and its circumstances. Develop programs for the identification of hazards on bus routes. Develop guidelines for the appropriate placement of radios on school buses. When establishing bus routes, consider unusual operating characteristics or grade crossing accident histories. Advise members to disable radio speakers located next to drivers' heads.

In addition, the American Association of State Highway and Transportation Officials, National Association of County Engineers, American Public Works Association, Institute of Transportation Engineers, Association of American Railroads, American Short Line Railroad Association and American Public Transit Association were all advised to notify their members of the circumstances of the crash, and distribute information on the importance of exchanging information about railroad/highway grade crossings.

In the state of Illinois alone, 188 other interconnected crossings were inspected for hazardous conditions. Of these, 24 had similar problems, and were repaired.

=== Bus route changes ===
New route designs brought the number of routes crossing railroad tracks in the District 47 and District 155 school systems down from 70% in 1996 to 10% in 1997.

== Memorials ==
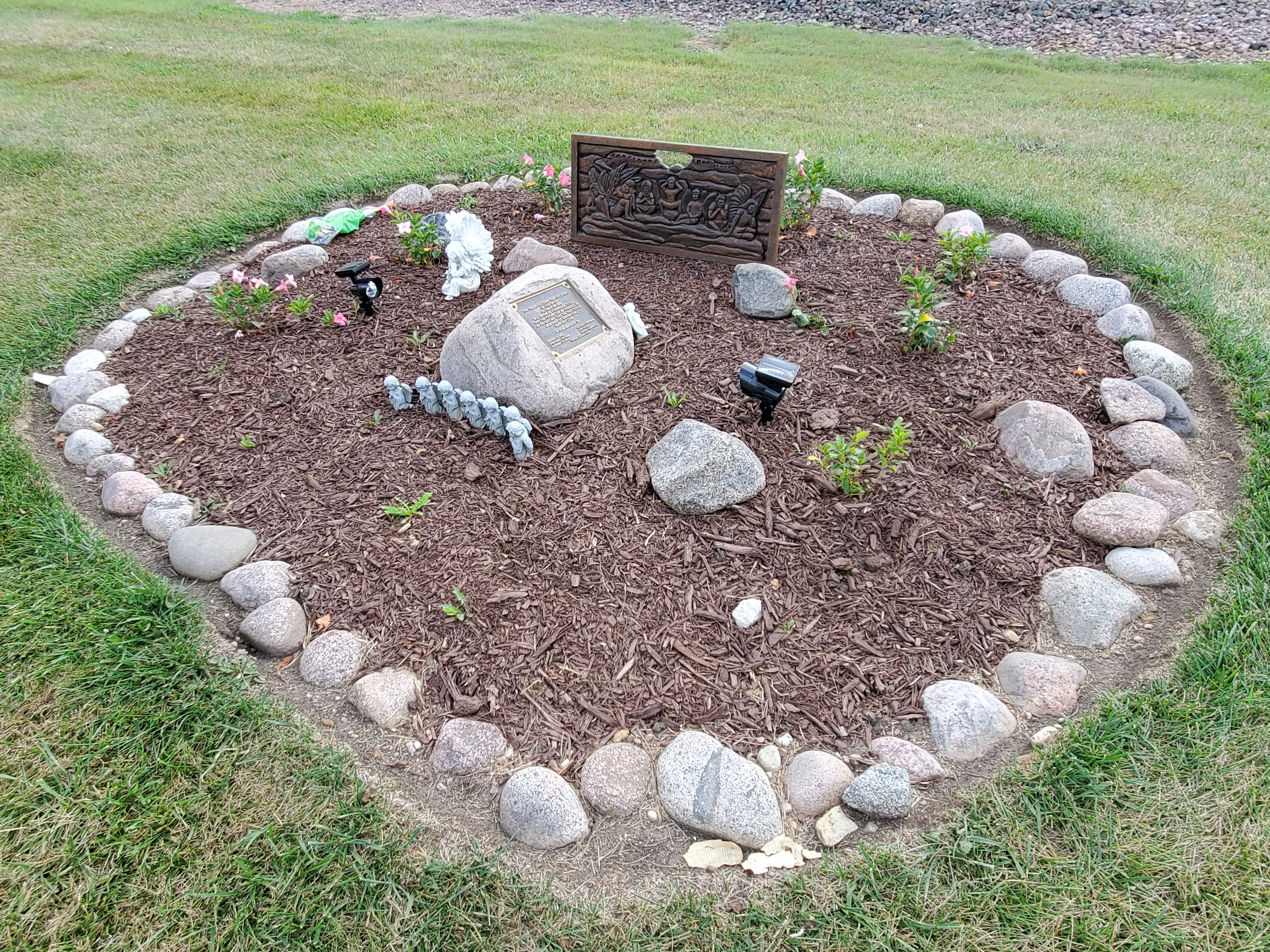
The memorial near the site of the accident.

A large granite memorial and two plaques were placed near the site of the crash in memory of the seven students killed in the crash.

The library under construction in Fox River Grove was named the Fox River Grove Memorial Library in memory of the accident victims. A memorial plaza was constructed on library grounds and was dedicated in October 2000.

A memorial was installed at Cary-Grove High School, the destination of the bus. The memorial, called The Circle of Friends, features 36 stones to represent the passengers and driver of the bus, and seven blue spruce trees to commemorate those who died.

== See also ==
- List of level crossing crashes
- List of rail accidents (1990–99)
- 1938 South Jordan rail crossing disaster, a 1938 collision between a freight train and a school bus due to poor visibility.
- Clarkstown, New York, train-bus collision, 1972 collision between freight train and school bus where driver was unfamiliar with the route.
- Valhalla train crash, 2015 accident in similar setting in New York where SUV on tracks was struck by rush-hour commuter train, killing six including SUV driver; crossing barrier struck vehicle, driver was apparently unaware she was in train's path, and questions were raised about traffic signal timing on adjacent major highway.
