= Clarkstown, New York, train–bus collision =

1972 crossing accident in Clarkstown, New York

Gilchrest Road crossing accident
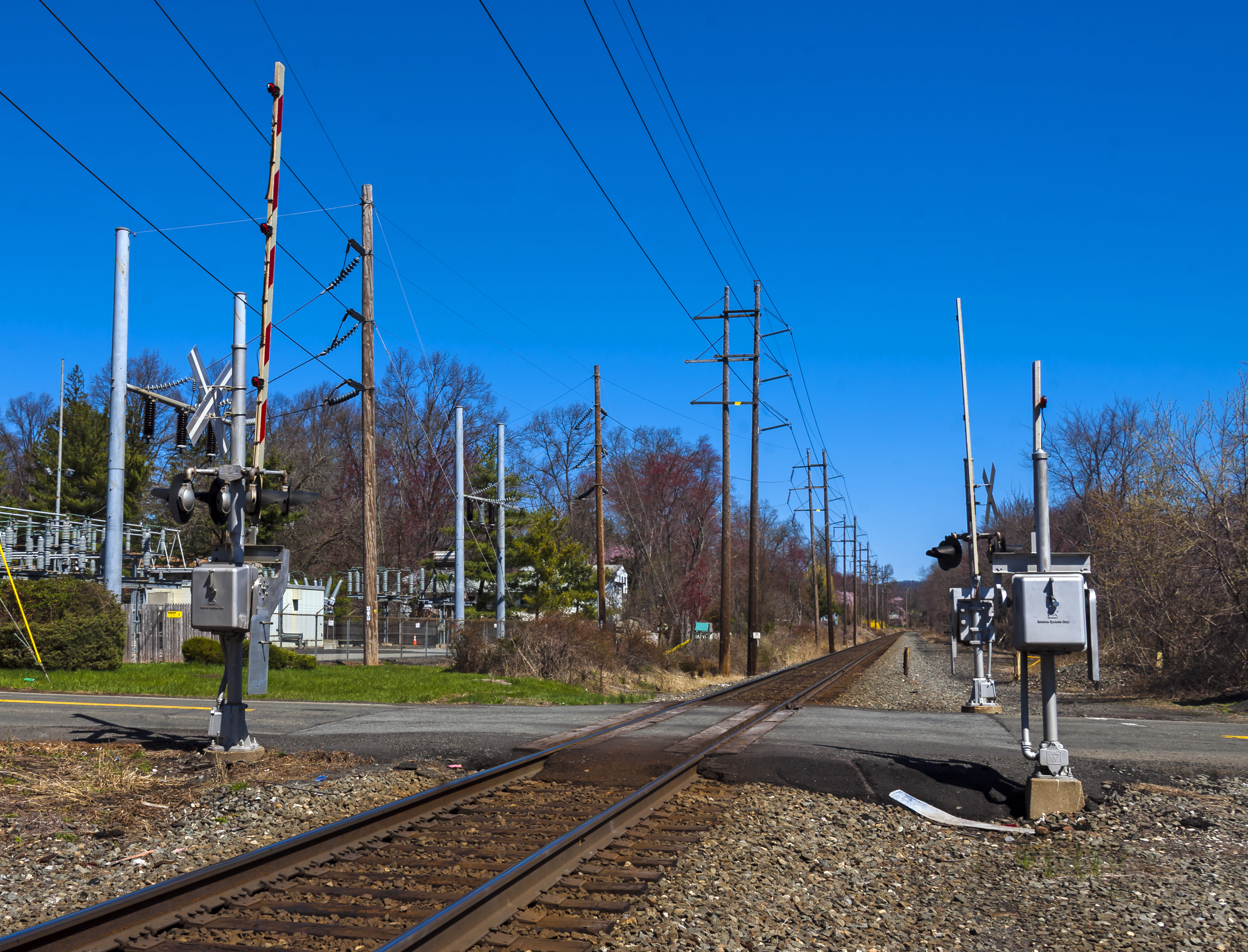
- The CSX grade crossing in April 2018, after grade crossing barriers and lights were installed. seen from the southeast

Details
- Date: March 24, 1972; 54 years ago about 7:55 am
- Location: Clarkstown, New York
- Coordinates: 41.1338°N 73.9452°W
- Country: United States
- Operator: Penn Central
- Incident type: Grade crossing
- Cause: Bus driver's failure to yield at a grade crossing

Statistics
- Vehicles: Freight train and school bus
- Deaths: 5
- Injured: 46

The Gilchrest Road crossing accident was a grade crossing incident that occurred on March 24, 1972, in the town of Clarkstown, New York, between the hamlets of Valley Cottage and Congers, roughly 25 miles (40 km) northwest of New York City. Five students from Valley Cottage were killed, and 44 others were injured.

The Penn Central (formerly New York Central, now CSX) railroad crossing at Gilchrest Road West, just outside Valley Cottage, contained only crossbucks and lacked additional warning hardware, such as flashing lights, crossing gates or a warning bell. The railway line was also difficult for road vehicles to see due to the curvature of the road and lineside trees.

== Crash ==
On the morning of March 24, 1972, 35-year-old Joseph Larkin was driving Nyack High School GMC H6500 school bus number 596, loaded past capacity, downhill on Gilchrest Road. The bus was filled with 48 passengers, with some left standing due to lack of room. Penn Central freight train WV-1 (with #2653, a GE U25B as its leading locomotive), traveling at 25 miles per hour (40 km/h) with 83 loaded freight cars and a caboose (73 from origin at Weehawken, New Jersey, plus ten more picked up en route at North Bergen), destined for Penn Central's Selkirk, New York yard, was heading toward the Gilchrest Road crossing and began blowing its horn. Larkin did not decrease the speed of the bus as he approached the grade crossing.

The train engineer saw the bus cross the tracks and immediately applied the brakes. However, the train's momentum carried it through the crossing, where it collided with the bus. The freight train ripped through the school bus, severing it into two sections, with the front half coming to rest a quarter mile (1,116 ft) down the tracks. The rear section of the bus was torn loose, and fell off next to the tracks upside down with a number of students still inside, while several other students were ejected from the remaining portion of the bus, passing through separated floor sections and falling between the rails into the path of the train.

As survivor Timothy Wilkins described it, "All of a sudden, someone yelled, 'Train.' I looked up and the train was there. I heard the train brakes and I heard the engine..."

== Victims ==
Three students, Jimmy McGuinness (17), Richard Macaylo (18), and Bobby Mauterer (14), were killed instantly. Forty-five more students and Larkin were rushed to a nearby hospital, where 14-year-old Thomas Grosse died from his injuries several days later. 16-year-old Stephen Ward died on April 14. Some of the children who survived required artificial limbs. Describing the scene at the hospital, one reporter wrote that "anguished mothers, some still clad in bathrobes, crowded the hospital lobby seeking information on their children." None of the train crew were injured in the crash.

== Trial ==
Larkin was brought to trial and charged with criminal negligent homicide in the death of the five students. He pled not guilty to all charges. At trial, witnesses testified that Larkin failed to stop the bus before crossing into the train's path, while Larkin testified he neither saw nor heard the train beforehand. Larkin was convicted of criminally negligent homicide and sentenced to five years’ probation; he died in 1998 at the age of 61.

== Aftermath ==
After the crash there was public outcry and anger against the driver and the fact that there were no warning gates or lights at the crossing. On September 22, 1972, the National Transportation Safety Board directed a recommendation relating to the crash toward the National Highway Traffic Safety Administration. Louis M. Thayer was part of the five member board of the Federal Agency to question witnesses and investigate the crash.

A mass for three students who were killed was held at St. Paul's Roman Catholic Church in Congers. A special interdenominational prayer service for the recovery of the injured was held as part of the Palm Sunday observance at All Saints Protestant Episcopal Church in Valley Cottage.

Because of the crash, the New York State Department of Motor Vehicles established article 19-A, which is a system that all bus drivers must be qualified to drive by satisfying a number of requirements, including biennial medical exams (with follow-ups if needed), biennial written or oral tests, biennial road tests, yearly defensive driving tests, provision of yearly license abstracts, and fingerprinting with criminal history reviews. Article 19-A was established in 1974, two years after the crash.

== See also ==
- 1972 in rail transport
- 1972 in the United States
- List of American railroad accidents
- List of level crossing accidents
- List of rail accidents (1970–79)
- Long Journey Back, a 1978 TV movie based on the Gilchrest Road Accident
- 1995 Fox River Grove bus–train collision, similar grade-crossing accident in Chicago suburbs where substitute school bus driver lacked familiarity with route
- Blackheath train accident, 2010 crash in South Africa also resulting from school taxi driver's attempt to beat train through crossing
