= Nova Iguaçu level crossing disaster =

1951 transport incident in Brazil

Coordinates: 22°45′34″S 43°27′11″W

Details
- Date: June 7, 1951; 4:25 a.m.
- Location: Nova Iguaçu
- Country: Brazil
- Operator: Estrada de Ferro Central do Brasil
- Incident type: Level crossing collision
- Cause: stalled vehicle

Statistics
- Trains: 1
- Deaths: 54
- Injured: 44

The Nova Iguaçu level crossing disaster occurred on June 7, 1951, at 4:25 a.m. when an electric train struck a gasoline truck on a level crossing near Nova Iguacu, twenty miles north of Rio de Janeiro, killing 54 people.

The Estrada de Ferro Central do Brasil company's train was travelling from Belém, and its five steel cars were full of early morning commuters heading for Rio. The truck, which carried 4,500 gallons of gasoline, had stalled on the level crossing. When the train struck the tanker exploded; many of the passengers were burnt alive; some were still sitting in their seats, while others piled up by the doors. In all 54 people were killed and 44 more injured.

== Sources ==
- Railway Wrecks by Edgar A. Haine, page 146, publ 1993, ISBN 0-8453-4844-2

== See also ==
- Train wreck
