= Hectorspruit =

- Emjejane
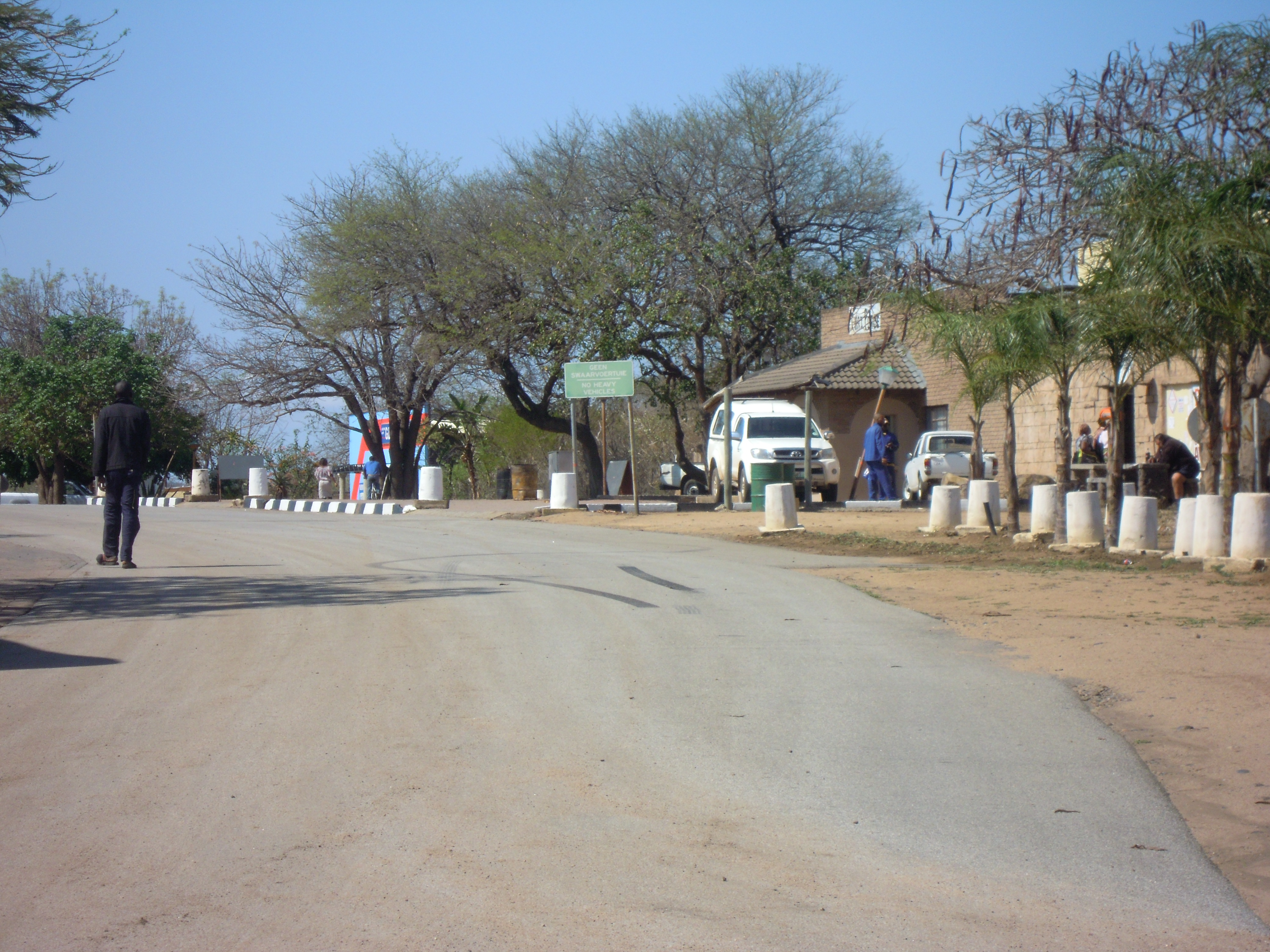
- A street in Hectorspruit

- Location within Mpumalanga Location within South Africa
- Coordinates: 25°26′S 31°41′E
- Country: South Africa
- Province: Mpumalanga
- District: Ehlanzeni
- Municipality: Nkomazi

Area
  - Total: 10.26 km^{2} (3.96 sq mi)

Population (2011)
  - Total: 3,096
  - Density: 301.8/km^{2} (781.5/sq mi)

Racial makeup (2011)
  - Black African: 77.9%
  - Coloured: 0.8%
  - Indian/Asian: 0.4%
  - White: 20.8%
  - Other: 0.1%

First languages (2011)
  - Swati: 55.0%
  - Afrikaans: 18.6%
  - Tsonga: 17.0%
  - English: 4.1%
  - Other: 5.3%
- Time zone: UTC+2 (SAST)
- PO box: 1330
- Area code: 013

Hectorspruit, officially Emjejane, is a small farming town situated between Kaapmuiden and Komatipoort on a southern tributary of the Crocodile River in Mpumalanga, South Africa. The farms in the region produce sugarcane, subtropical fruit and vegetables. The stream is named after a dog belonging to S de Kock, chief surveyor of the Pretoria - Delagoa Bay railway line.

Hamlet some 30 km west of Komatipoort and 80 km north-east of Pigg's Peak. The hamlet is named after a tributary of the Crocodile River, the Hectorspruit, which is said to take its name from a hunting dog that died there after being bitten by a tsetse fly.

The hamlet was officially renamed in 2005 to Emjejane (SiSwati) after late Chief Mjejane Ngomane.
