= Bahanaga =

- Town
- Location in Odisha, India
- Coordinates: 21°34′11.03″N 86°56′09.49″E
- Country: India
- State: Odisha
- District: Balasore
- Time zone: UTC+5:30 (IST)
- PIN: 756042

Bahanaga, is a town in Balasore district of the Indian state of Odisha. It's one of the major business spots in the Balasore district.

== Overview ==
Bahanaga block consists of 21 grampanchayats. The block office itself resides in Bahanaga.

== Geography ==
Bahanaga village is situated near National Highway 16 (NH-16), making it a commercial hub. A part of the block is on the sea shore of the Bay of Bengal, 10–12 km (East) away from the block headquarters. The climate is temperate.

== Demographics and culture ==
As of 2011 census, there is a total of 151 houses, with a population of 593, of which there are 310 males and 283 females. Children of the age range, 0-6, are 81 (41 males and 40 females). There are 85 schedule caste and 164 scheduled tribes in this village. Literacy in this locality is 66.41% and improving.

== Communication and transportation ==
The block headquarters, Bahanaga, is well connected with its nearest cities, Soro and Balasore by both road and railways. The Bahanaga Bazar railway station serves almost a thousand people daily. Some local trains halt here. The nearest big railway stations are Soro and Balasore. By the National highway 16, Bahanaga is almost connected with the rest of Odisha. The other major big places, Gopalpur and Khantapara are also connected with other places either via the roadways or railways.

It was the site of the 2023 Odisha train collision.
