= Howrah–SMVT Bengaluru Superfast Express =

Train in India

Overview
- Service type: Superfast
- First service: 15 January 2002; 24 years ago
- Current operator: South Eastern Railway

Route
- Termini: Howrah Junction (HWH); SMVT Bengaluru (SMVB)
- Stops: 31
- Distance travelled: 1,942 km (1,207 mi)
- Average journey time: 32 hrs 15 mins
- Service frequency: Daily. (Note: All directions.)
- Train number: 12863 / 12864

On-board services
- Classes: AC 1 Tier, AC 2 Tier, AC 3 Tier, AC 3 Tier Economy, Sleeper Class, General Unreserved Class
- Seating arrangements: Yes
- Sleeping arrangements: Yes
- Catering facilities: On-board Catering, E-Catering
- Observation facilities: Large windows, Dustbins, Washrooms
- Entertainment facilities: No
- Baggage facilities: Yes

Technical
- Rolling stock: LHB coach
- Track gauge: 1,676 mm (5 ft 6 in)
- Operating speed: 60 km/h (37 mph) average including halts.
Route map
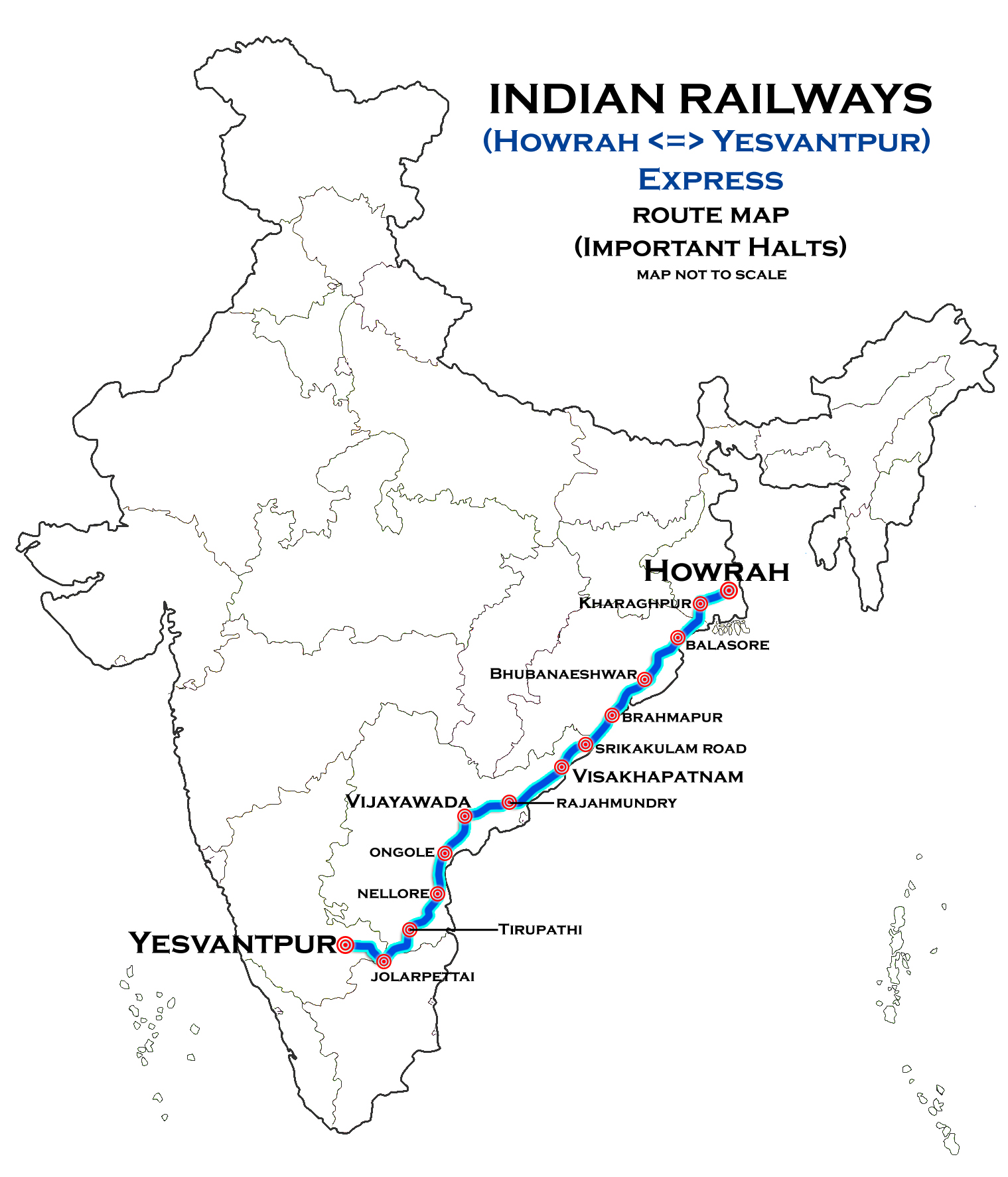

The 12863 / 12864 Howrah-SMVT Bengaluru Superfast Express (formerly the Howrah-Yesvantpur Superfast Express), is a Superfast train belonging to the South Eastern Railway zone that runs daily between Howrah Junction of West Bengal and SMVT Bengaluru of Karnataka in India.

On June 2, 2023, this line was involved in India's worst train accident in decades, with 296 fatalities.

== Service ==
The service has an average speed of 57 km/h (35 mph) and covers 1,942 km (1,207 mi) in an average time of 32h 15m.

== Route and stations served ==
Major stops:

- Kharagpur Junction
- Balasore
- Cuttack Junction
- Bhubaneswar
- Khurda Road Junction
- Vizianagaram Junction
- Visakhapatnam Junction (where the train reverses direction)
- Visakhapatnam Junction
- Eluru
- Vijayawada Junction
- Tirupati
- Katpadi Junction

Station Code	Station Name	12863		Distance from Source in km	Day	12864		Distance from Source in km	Day
Station Code	Station Name	Arrival	Departure	Distance from Source in km	Day	Arrival	Departure	Distance from Source in km	Day
HWH	Howrah Junction	Source	22:45	0	1	20:10	Destination	1942	2
SRC	Santragachi Junction	----	----	7	1	19:12	19:14	1935	2
MCA	Mecheda	23:44	23:46	58	1	18:14	18:16	1884	2
KGP	Kharagpur Junction	00:30	00:35	114	2	17:25	17:30	1827	2
BLS	Balasore	01:55	02:00	230	2	15:35	15:37	1711	2
BHC	Bhadrak	03:03	03:05	293	2	14:23	14:25	1648	2
JJKR	Jajpur Keonjhar Road	03:28	03:30	336	2	13:31	13:33	1605	2
CTC	Cuttack Junction	04:30	04:35	409	2	12:35	12:40	1533	2
BBS	Bhubaneswar	05:10	05:15	436	2	12:00	12:05	1505	2
KUR	Khurda Road Junction	05:30	05:40	455	2	11:10	11:30	1486	2
BALU	Balugaon	06:33	06:35	526	2	09:53	09:55	1415	2
BAM	Brahmapur	07:20	07:30	602	2	09:00	09:10	1339	2
PSA	Palasa	09:08	09:10	677	2	08:10	08:12	1264	2
CHE	Srikakulam Road	09:58	10:00	750	2	06:48	06:50	1191	2
VZM	Vizianagaram Junction	10:55	11:00	819	2	05:50	05:55	1122	2
VSKP	Visakhapatnam Junction	12:10	12:30	880	2	04:35	04:55	1061	2
SLO	Samalkot Junction	14:24	14:25	1031	2	02:03	02:05	910	2
RJY	Rajahmundry	15:08	15:10	1081	2	01:13	01:15	860	2
TDD	Tadepalligudem	15:54	15:55	1123	2	00:23	00:25	819	2
EE	Eluru	16:33	16:35	1170	2	23:48	23:50	771	1
BZA	Vijayawada Junction	18:10	18:20	1230	2	22:40	22:50	711	1
TEL	Tenali Junction	18:43	18:45	1262	2	21:58	22:00	680	1
BPP	Bapatla	19:18	19:20	1304	2	21:18	21:20	637	1
CLX	Chirala	19:33	19:35	1319	2	20:58	21:00	622	1
OGL	Ongole	20:13	20:15	1368	2	20:18	20:20	573	1
NLR	Nellore	21:53	21:55	1485	2	18:33	18:35	456	1
GDR	Gudur Junction	----	----	1523	3	17:58	18:00	418	1
RU	Renigunta Junction	00:10	00:20	1607	3	16:30	16:35	334	1
TPTY	Tirupati	00:45	00:50	1617	3	16:00	16:05	324	1
KPD	Katpadi Junction	02:45	02:50	1721	3	14:15	14:20	220	1
JTJ	Jolarpettai Junction	04:08	04:10	1806	3	12:58	13:00	135	1
KPN	Kuppam	04:44	04:45	1847	3	12:00	12:01	95	1
BWT	Bangarapet Junction	05:13	05:15	1881	3	11:33	11:35	60	1
KJM	Krishnarajapuram	05:53	05:55	1937	3	10:46	10:48	4	1
SMVB	SMVT Bengaluru	07:00	Destination	1942	3	Source	10:35	0	1

== Coach composite ==
The train consists of 22 LHB coaches

- 1 AC I Tier
- 2 AC II Tier
- 4 AC III Tier
- 2 AC III Tier Economy
- 6 Sleeper Coaches
- 4 General Unreserved
- 1 Seating Cum Luggage Rake
- 1 Pantry Car
- 1 Engine On Generator
- 1 Parcel Van

Loco	1	2	3	4	5	6	7	8	9	10	11	12	13	14	15	16	17	18	19	20	21	22
	SLR	GN	GN	S1	S2	S3	S4	S5	S6	PC	M1	M2	B1	B2	B3	B4	A1	H1	GN	GN	EOG	VP

Trains are hauled by Santragachi Electric Loco Shed based WAP-7 electric locomotives.

== Accidents and incidents ==
On June 2, 2023, a SMVT Bengaluru—Howrah Superfast Express train was involved in an accident in Odisha. A Coromandel Express service collided with a freight train, which derailed; the Howrah–SMVT Bengaluru Superfast Express then collided with the debris. The accident occurred just before reaching Bahanaga Bazar railway station in Balasore district of Odisha state.

== Notes ==
Train leaves SMVT Bengaluru at 10:35 AM daily and reaches Howrah Junction on the second day at 20:10 PM.

Train leaves Howrah Junction t 22:45 PM daily and reaches SMVT Bengaluru on the third day at 07:00 AM.

== See also ==
- SMVT Bengaluru
- Howrah Junction
- Howrah–SMVT Bengaluru Humsafar Express
- Howrah–SMVT Bengaluru Duronto Express
- Howrah–SMVT Bengaluru AC Superfast Express
