= Badajahata =

- Village
- Location in Odisha, India
- Coordinates: 21°38′N 87°1′E
- India: India
- State: Odisha
- District: Balasore

Population (2011)
  - Total: 780
- Time zone: IST
- Postal code: 756028

Badajahata is a village in the Baleshwar district in Odisha in Eastern India with a population of 780. It is also known as Jahata Village. It is located about 10 km From Subarnareka River. The nearest town is Rupsa. The nearest Hospital is Rupsa Govt Hospital situated 4 km from the village.

== Educational institutions ==
- Jahata Primary School
- Udaya Nath Mohapatra Uchha Vidya Niketan, Barapal
- Bakharabad upme school -bakharabad
- Mohapatra High School, Rupsa, Kasipada Panchayat high school Rupsa

== Festivals celebrated ==
- Mahashivaratri
- Uda Festival
