= Haldipada railway station =

Railway station in Odisha

General information
- Location: National Highway 60, Guhipur, Haldipada, Balasore district, Odisha; India
- Coordinates: 21.571694°N 86.997222°E
- Elevation: 9 m (30 ft)
- System: Passenger train station
- Owner: Indian Railways
- Operator: South Eastern Railway
- Lines: Howrah–Chennai main line Kharagpur–Puri line
- Platforms: 4
- Tracks: 4

Construction
- Structure type: Standard (on ground station)

Other information
- Status: Functioning
- Station code: HIP
- Zone(s): South Eastern Railway zone
- Division(s): Kharagpur railway division

History
- Opened: 1901
- Former names: East Coast State Railway

Services
| Preceding station | Indian Railways | Following station |
|---|---|---|
| Rupsa Junction towards Howrah Junction | South Eastern Railway zone Howrah–Chennai main line | Tikirapal Halt towards Chennai Central |
Location
- Location within India Location within Odisha

Haldipada railway station is a railway station on Kharagpur–Puri line, part of the Howrah–Chennai main line under Kharagpur railway division of South Eastern Railway zone. It is situated beside National Highway 60 at Guhipur, Haldipada in Balasore district in the Indian state of Odisha. A total of 20 passengers trains stop at Haldipada railway station.

== History ==
In between 1893 and 1896 the East Coast State Railway constructed Howrah–Chennai main line. Kharagpur–Puri branch was finally opened for public in 1901. The route was electrified in several phases. In 2005, Howrah–Chennai route was completely electrified.

== Accident ==
On 29 December 1957, at about 22.14 hours, whilst Train No. 10 DN Janata Express was on the run between Rupsa and Haldipada stations, the driver heard an unusual sound and brought the train to a stand. On examination, it was found that the right hand rear bogie wheel tyre of the engine had burst. As the engin-e was not able to move, the rake of the Janata Express was drawn to Rupsa station. After the rake had been pulled back, efforts were made to pull the disabled engine, but it derailed of two front wheels.
