= Sri Jhadeshwar Road railway station =

Railway station in Odisha

General information
- Location: National Highway 16, Rajkona, Cuttack district, Odisha; India
- Coordinates: 20.596534°N 86.019256°E
- Elevation: 31 m (102 ft)
- System: Passenger train station
- Owner: Indian Railways
- Operator: East Coast Railway
- Lines: Howrah–Chennai main line Kharagpur–Puri line
- Platforms: 2
- Tracks: 2

Construction
- Structure type: Standard (on ground station)

Other information
- Status: Functioning
- Station code: SJDR
- Zone(s): East Coast Railway zone
- Division(s): Khurda Road railway division

History
- Opened: 1901
- Former names: East Coast State Railway

Services
| Preceding station | Indian Railways | Following station |
|---|---|---|
| Byree towards Howrah Junction | East Coast Railway zone Howrah–Chennai main line | Kapilas Road Junction towards Chennai Central |
Location
- Location within India Location within Odisha

Sri Jhadeshwar Road is a railway station on Kharagpur–Puri line, part of the Howrah–Chennai main line under Khurda Road railway division of East Coast Railway zone. It is situated beside National Highway 16 at Rajkona in Cuttack district in the Indian state of Odisha.

== History ==
In between 1893 and 1896 the East Coast State Railway constructed Howrah–Chennai main line. Kharagpur–Puri branch was finally opened for public in 1901. The route was electrified in several phases. In 2005, Howrah–Chennai route was completely electrified.
