= BYY =

BYY or Byy can refer to:

- ISO 639:byy or "Buya", a spurious ISO 639 code that may refer to Buyu language, spoken in the Democratic Republic of the Congo
- Bay City Municipal Airport, an airport in Bay City, Texas, U.S., by FAA LID code
- Bayleyite, a yellow, uranium-containing mineral, by International Mineralogical Association symbol
- Byree railway station, a train station in Odisha state, India
- Biyang County, an administrative division of Zhumadian, Henan, China; see List of administrative divisions of Henan
