= Dehurda =

- Location within Odisha
- Coordinates: 21°42′N 87°25′E
- Country: India
- State: Odisha
- District: Balasore district

Dehurda is a village in Balasore district, Odisha state, India.
