= Purunagan =

Village in Baleswar, Odisha, India

Coordinates: 21.595863°N 86.711618°E

Purungan is a village located in the Baleswar district of India's Odisha state. The south side of the village has river Sono and north side of it has large cultivation lands. According to the 2011 Census data, it was a medium-sized village with 182 families residing. It had a population of 700 and a literacy rate of 69%.
