= 2023 Odisha train collision =

Railway accident in Odisha, India

Odisha train collision
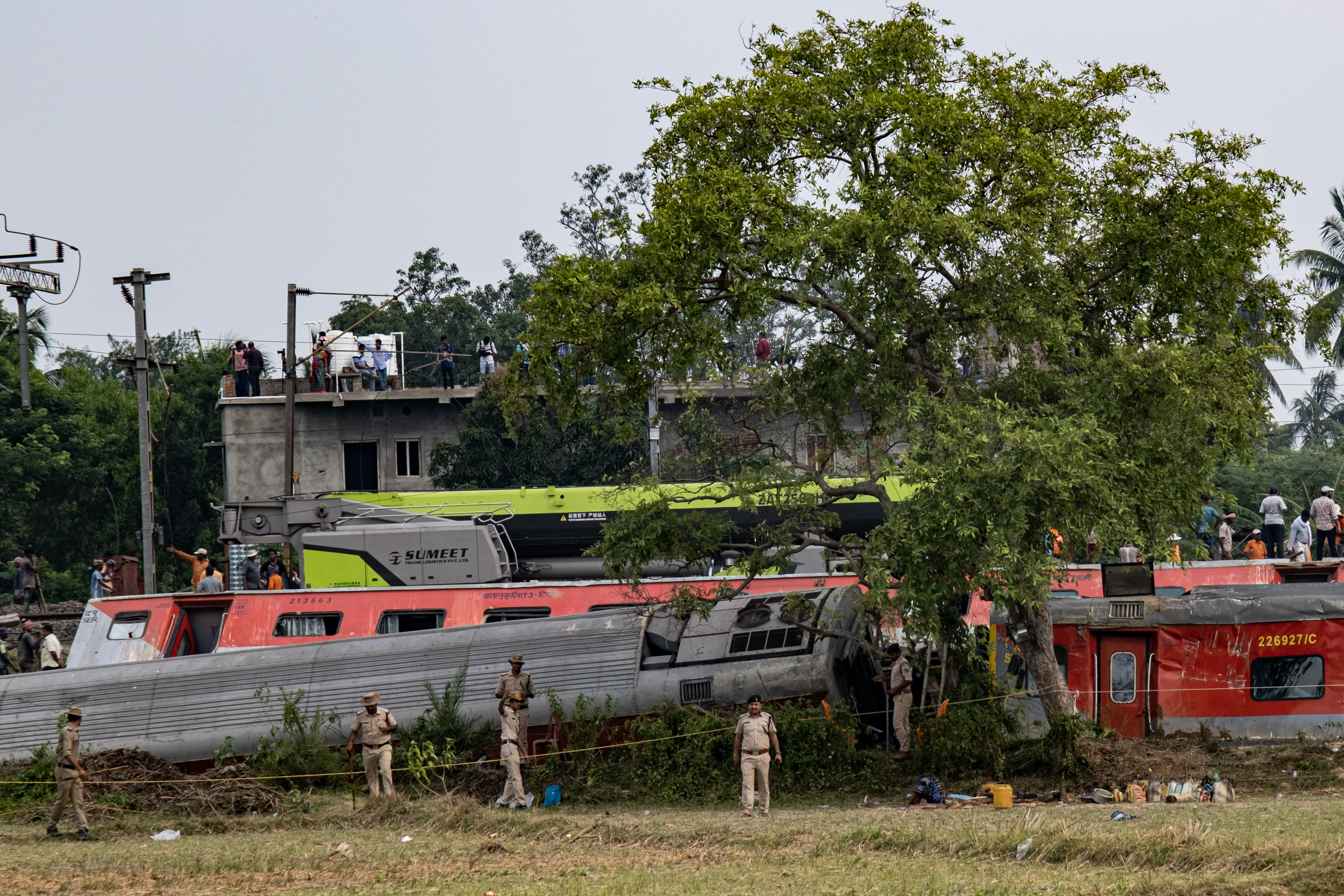
- Wreckage of the Coromandel Express
- Location of collision
- Crash location on a map of India

Details
- Date: 2 June 2023 around 19:00 IST (13:30 UTC)
- Location: Near Bahanaga Bazar railway station, Balasore, Odisha
- Coordinates: 21°20′17″N 86°45′52″E
- Country: India
- Line: Howrah–Chennai main line
- Operator: East Coast Railway zone
- Owner: Indian Railways
- Incident type: Collision, Derailment
- Cause: Electronic interlocking defect due to signalling error

Statistics
- Trains: 3 trains: A goods train carrying iron ore; 12841 Coromandel SF Express between Shalimar and Chennai Central; 12864 SMVT Bengaluru–Howrah SF Express between SMVT Bengaluru and Howrah
- Vehicles: Locomotive-WAP-7
- Deaths: 296
- Injured: 1,200+

On 2 June 2023, three trains collided in Balasore district in the East Indian state of Odisha. The accident occurred around 19:00 IST when Coromandel Express, a passenger train, collided with a stationary goods train near Bahanaga Bazar railway station on the Howrah–Chennai main line. Due to the high speed of the passenger train and the heavy tonnage of the goods train, the impact resulted in 21 coaches of the Coromandel Express derailing, three of which collided with the oncoming SMVT Bengaluru–Howrah Superfast Express on the adjacent track.

The accident killed 296 people and injured more than 1,200. It was one of the deadliest railway accidents in India. National Disaster Response Force (NDRF) and Odisha Disaster Rapid Action Force (ODRAF) were involved in the search and recovery efforts, assisted by other government agencies and the general public. The injured were treated at local hospitals in the region. In the aftermath, operations of more than 150 trains were impacted, with the cancellation of at least 48 trains. The rail services resumed on the line on 5 June after restoration work.

Preliminary investigation revealed that the Coromandel Express entered a passing loop line instead of the main line at full speed and crashed into the stationary goods train. In the aftermath, Railway Minister stated that a change in electronic interlocking due to an error in electronic signalling, caused the crash. He also said that sabotage was suspected and the railway board had recommended a Central Bureau of Investigation (CBI)-led probe. On 7 July 2023, the CBI arrested three railway officials believed to be responsible for the accident.

Despite the statement of the railway authorities that the accident was not a reflection of the safety issues in the system, various questions were raised by journalists, politicians and retired railway employees. The railway lines were not equipped with the Kavach train protection system. It was made aware that a similar signalling error had been reported earlier in February 2023 and a December 2022 report by the Comptroller and Auditor General of India had warned that the safety department of the railways lacked adequate staffing and funding, suffered from misuse of funds and that these could impact the quality of maintenance.

== Crash ==
On 2 June 2023, the Coromandel Express (Train no:12841) was travelling from Shalimar in Howrah, West Bengal, to Chennai Central in Chennai, Tamil Nadu on the up line of the Howrah-Chennai main line near Bahanaga Bazar railway station. At the same time, the SMVT Bengaluru–Howrah Express (Train no:12864) was travelling in the opposite direction from Sir M. Visvesvaraya Terminal in Bengaluru, Karnataka, to Howrah on the adjacent down line. Neither of the trains were scheduled to stop at the Bahanaga Bazar railway station and received a green signal to proceed along the main line. The trains were travelling fast, close to the maximum permitted speed of 128 km/h (80 mph).

Diagram of the 2023 Odisha train collision

At about 19:00 IST, the Coromandel Express, which was intended to pass straight on the up line, was instead wrongly switched to the parallel up loop line, where it collided with a stationary goods train laden with iron ore. Because of the high speed of the passenger train and the weight of the goods train, 21 coaches of the Coromandel Express derailed. The goods train did not derail. Three of the derailed coaches from the Coromandel Express careened into the adjacent track and whip-lashed the tail end of the SMVT Bengaluru–Howrah Express, which was crossing on the down line at the same time. Two unreserved coaches and the brake van of the SMVT Bengaluru–Howrah Express derailed.

== Emergency response ==
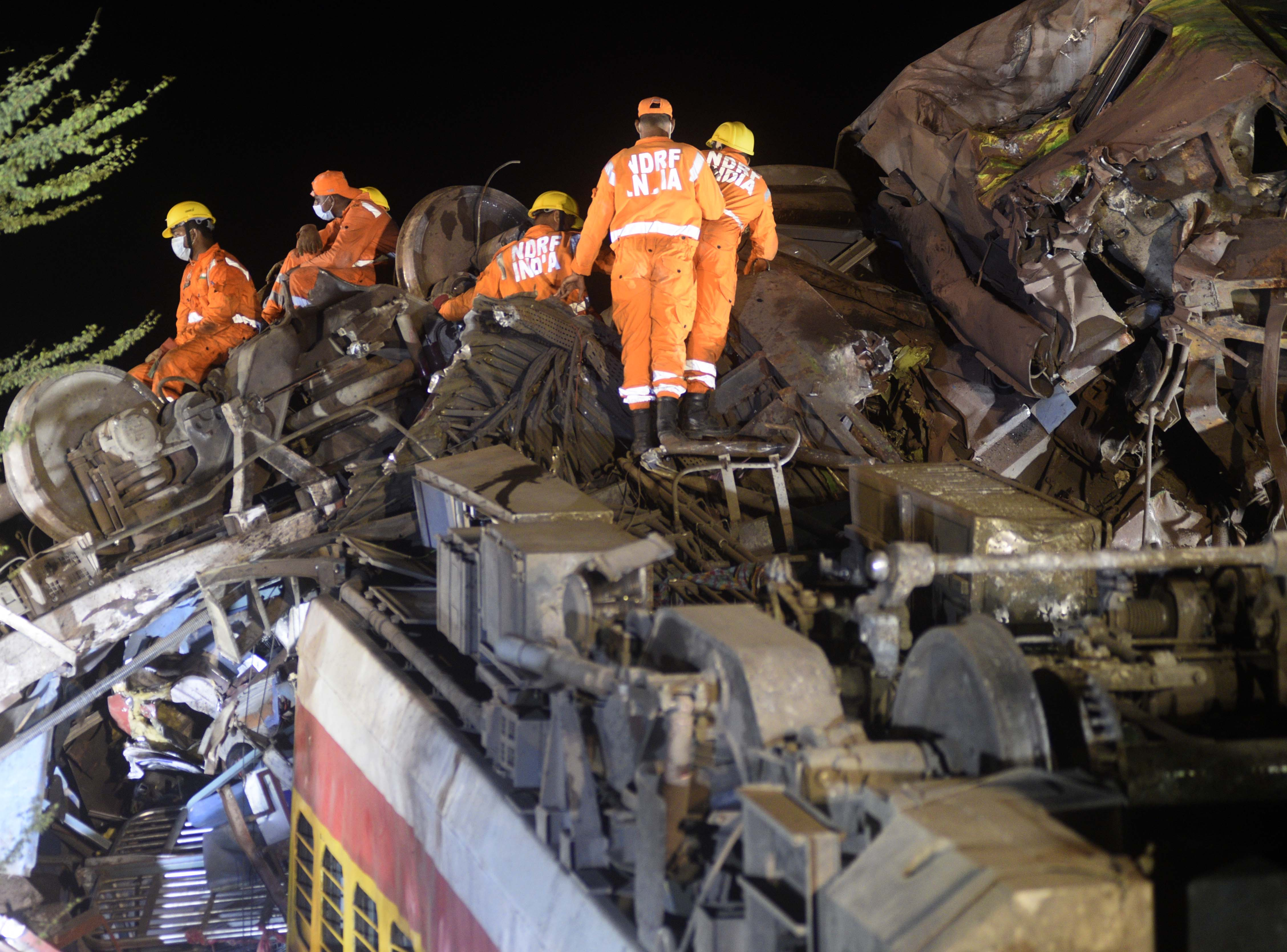
Members of the National Disaster Response Force on the site

Indian Railways published the reservation charts for both the passenger trains on its website. The railways and the governments of Odisha, West Bengal and Tamil Nadu issued helpline numbers. According to the Chief Secretary of Odisha, three National Disaster Response Force (NDRF) units, four Odisha Disaster Rapid Action Force (ODRAF) units, more than 15 fire rescue teams, 100 doctors, 200 police personnel and 200 ambulances were mobilised for the rescue operations. Locals assisted in the relief effort, helping the stranded passengers and transporting the injured passengers to the hospital.

The Government of West Bengal sent a team consisting of 40 doctors, nurses and 30 ambulances to assist in the rescue operations. The Government of Tamil Nadu sent a high level delegation comprising two state ministers and three IAS officers to assist the passengers and arranged a treatment facility with 70 beds at Chennai's Rajiv Gandhi Government General Hospital. Search dogs were used to find survivors. The search and recovery operations continued till the afternoon of 3 June. Locals from neighbouring areas helped in donating blood to treat the injured.

== Victims ==
A total of 296 people died in the crash. Bodies of deceased passengers were taken to a local high school, chosen due to its open spaces and its location close to the crash site. Identification of the bodies was made difficult due to burns and other trauma, leading officials to rely on personal belongings to try to identify the passengers. Most of the casualties were from the first three cars of the Coromandel Express, which included two general category coaches. These unreserved coaches were often the most crowded, as they allowed anyone with the cheapest category ticket to board without a specific seat reserved for them and were frequently used by migrant workers. As the railways had only the names of passengers with reserved seats, this made identification more difficult. There were allegations of bodies being handed over to the wrong families due to difficulties in identification. Subsequently, DNA tests were carried out to try to identify the unclaimed bodies.

Over 1,200 people were injured in the crash. On 3 June, the Odisha government officials indicated that 1,175 people were admitted to various hospitals as a result of the crash, out of which 793 had minor injuries and were released after treatment, while 382 were undergoing treatment. Local hospitals were overwhelmed by the influx of injured people and faced difficulties in providing patients with adequate care. South Western Railway said that 994 reserved and 300 unreserved passengers were travelling on the Howrah Express that had departed from Bengaluru and that ascertaining the identification of passengers on the unreserved coaches would take time. Despite the severe impact, the locomotive pilot of the Coromandel Express and his assistant survived the crash with injuries.

== Aftermath ==
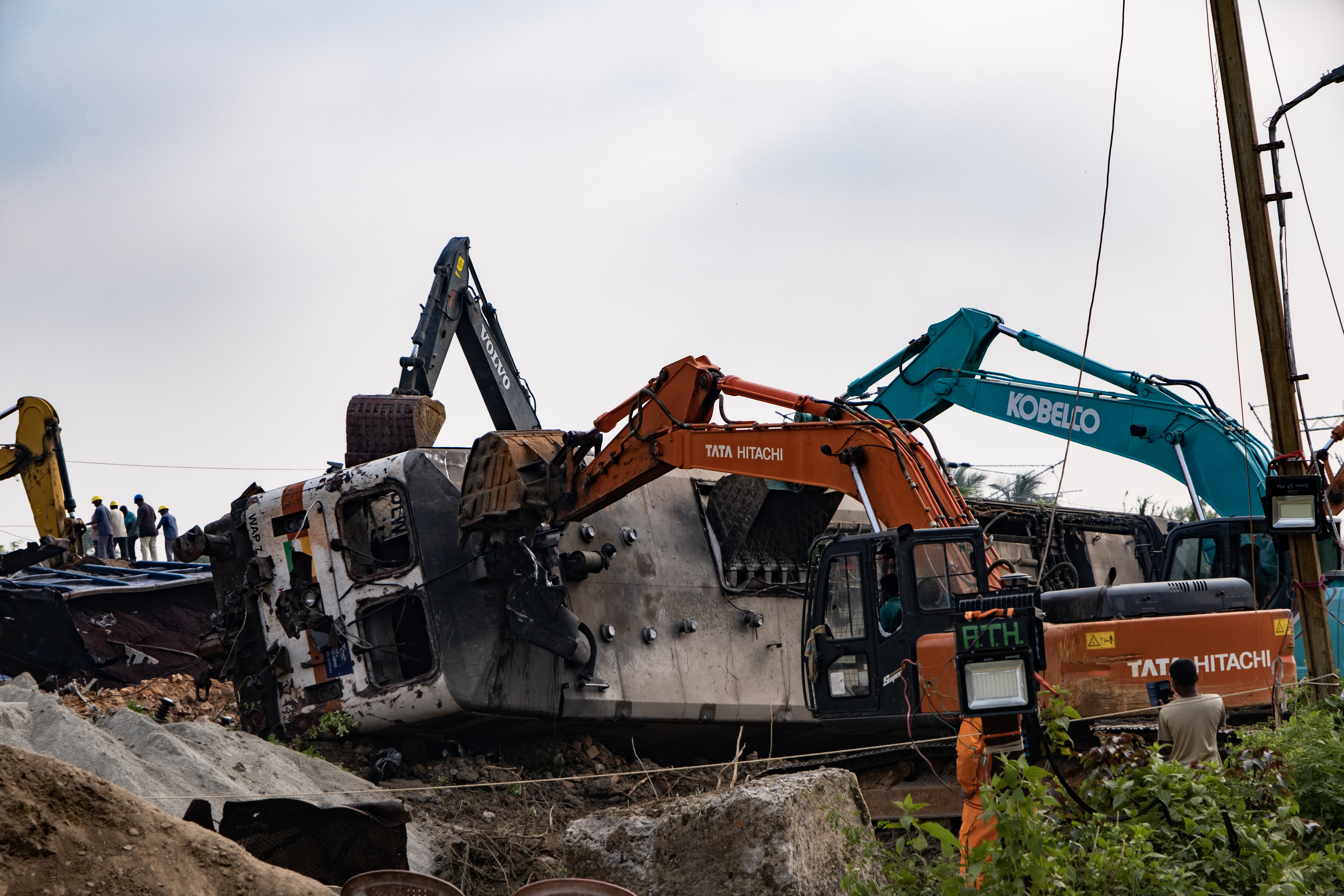
Clearing operations at the crash site

Indian Railways announced a compensation of ₹1 million (US$11,000) to the families of the deceased, ₹200,000 (US$2,100) to the severely injured, and ₹50,000 (US$530) to those with minor injuries. Further, ex gratia compensation of ₹200,000 (US$2,100) from the Prime Minister's National Relief Fund (PMNRF) was announced to the families of the deceased and ₹50,000 (US$530) to the injured. Mamata Banerjee, the Chief Minister of West Bengal, announced a compensation of ₹500,000 (US$5,300) to the families of the passengers from West Bengal who had been killed, ₹100,000 (US$1,100) to those who had been critically injured, and ₹50,000 (US$530) to those with minor injuries. The Government of Tamil Nadu announced a compensation of ₹500,000 (US$5,300) to the kin of those who had died in the accident.

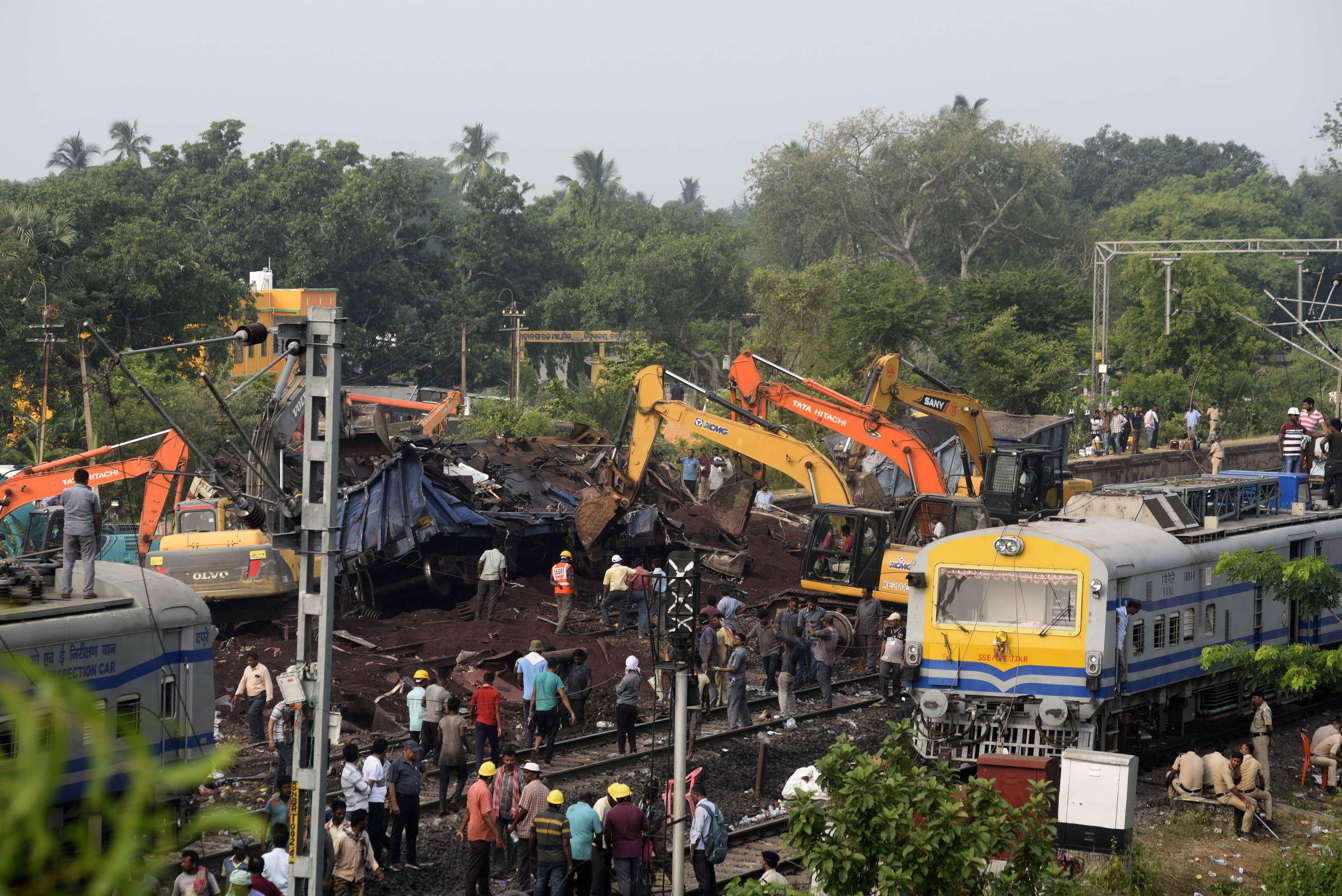
Excavators used to clear the tracks in the aftermath

The remainder of the SMVT Bengaluru–Howrah Express not affected by the crash, which included the engine and 20 coaches, left with its passengers and continued to Balasore, where a further damaged coach was detached. The remaining 19 coaches of the train and a special train arranged to accommodate the remaining passengers, arrived at Howrah on 3 June with 643 passengers. Arrangements were made to check the health of the passengers and buses were arranged to take the passengers home. One of the buses carrying passengers crashed into another vehicle in West Bengal's Medinipur with some passengers suffering minor injuries. Another train left from Bhadrak for Chennai on the same day with 195 stranded passengers from the Coromandel Express.

In the aftermath, operations of more than 150 trains were affected. At least 48 trains on the affected route were cancelled, 39 trains were diverted, and 10 were short-terminated on the day of the accident. The inaugural run of the Mumbai CSMT–Madgaon Vande Bharat Express, which had been scheduled for 3 June, was cancelled. The Ministry of Civil Aviation directed airlines to ensure that airfares did not surge in response to increased travel demand due to cancellation of trains. Bus fares in the region, however, showed a steep rise due to increased demand for seats. On 4 June, South Eastern Railway announced that efforts had commenced on restoring the tracks at the crash site. The rail services resumed on 5 June after more than 51 hours of restoration work.

== Investigation ==
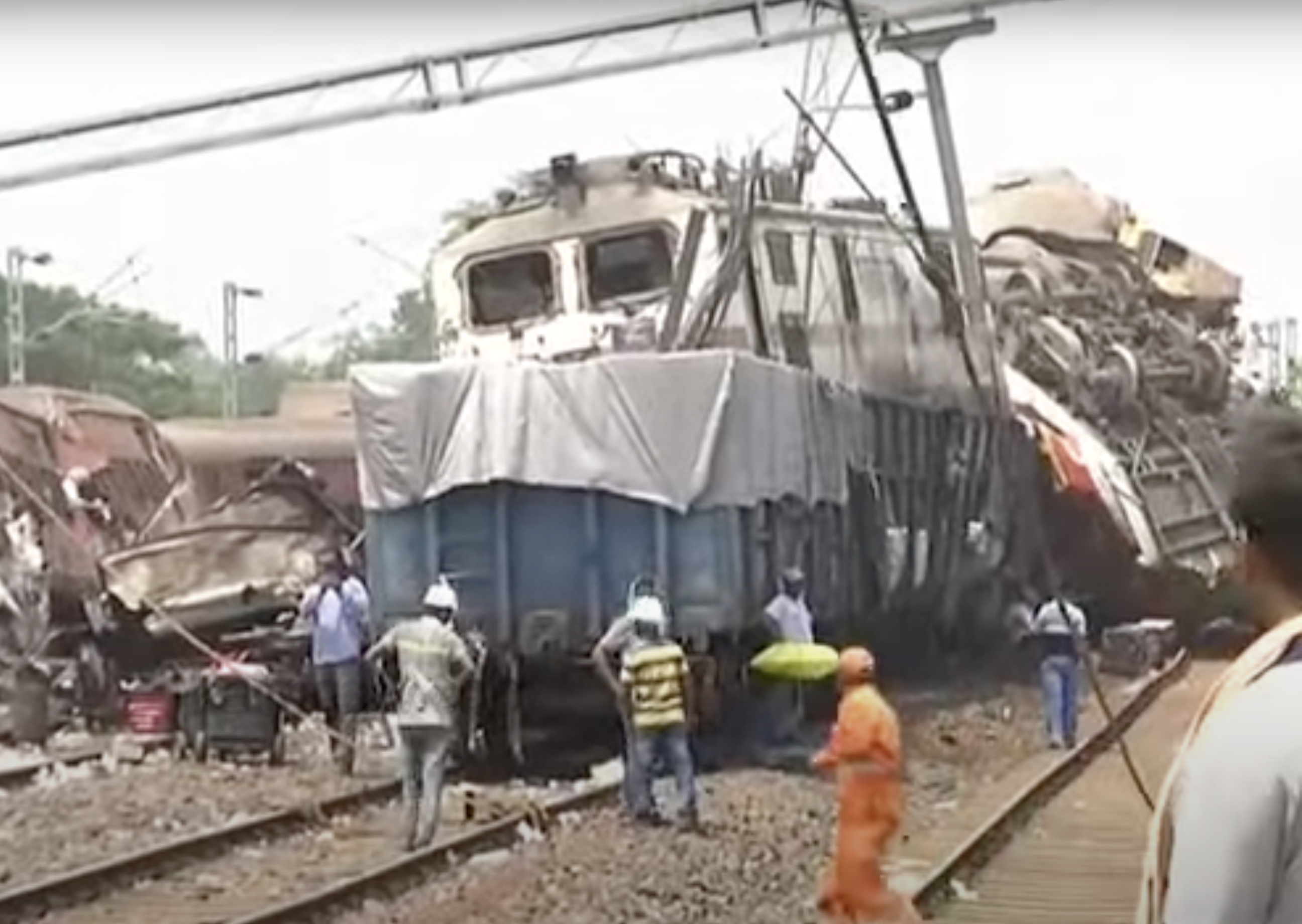
Locomotive of the Coromandel Express on top of the wagons of the goods train

External videos
- Aerial visuals of the accident site on 3 June via ANI on Twitter
- Animated explanation of the accident by NDTV

A preliminary investigation conducted by officials of the Kharagpur railway division indicated that the following sequence of events occurred:

- The Coromandel Express was heading towards Chennai on a southbound up line at speeds close to 128 km/h (80 mph) and was given the green signal to proceed on the main line. However, the signal was modified to take the train off the main line for unknown reasons, and the track was switched to a loop line adjacent to the main line.
- The Coromandel Express then hit the rear end of a stationary goods train, which was on the south loop line. This caused the locomotive of the Coromandel Express to climb over the wagons of the goods train and caused the derailment of 22 of its coaches.
- In the meantime, the SMVT Bengaluru–Howrah Express, which was heading towards Howrah on the northbound down line at a speed of approximately 126 km/h (78 mph), was passing the Coromandel Express in the opposite direction. At the moment of the crash, most of the coaches of the SMVT Bengaluru–Howrah Express had passed the other train except for the rear end.
- When the Coromandel Express derailed, three of its coaches hit the last two coaches (along with the brake van) of the SMVT Bengaluru–Howrah Express; consequently, those five coaches saw most of the casualties.

On 4 June, Ashwini Vaishnaw, the Minister of Railways, stated that a change in electronic interlocking, due to an error in electronic signaling, had led to the accident. The Chairman of the Indian Railway Board said that the electronic interlocking system was largely fail-safe but this rare case of failure might have been caused by a damaged wire or short circuit. On 6 June, the railway minister said that the Commission of Railway Safety (CRS) has investigated the matter and the railway board had recommended a Central Bureau of Investigation (CBI)-led probe. He also suggested that someone might have changed the point rails as an act of sabotage, which was described as highly unlikely by a signal inspector due to time constraints. A former Railway Board member questioned the claim of having identified the perpetrator even before the full investigation into the cause of the accident, affirmed that the CRS was better equipped to handle the investigation than the CBI and that only a CRS enquiry could uncover systemic failures as the CBI probe would only identify the culprits.

On 7 July 2023, the CBI detailed the progress in the case and arrested three railway officials believed to be responsible for the accident. The CBI statement identified them as a technician and two signal engineers employed with Indian Railways, who were charged with culpable homicide and destruction of evidence in the case.

The railway authorities stated that the lines were not equipped with the Kavach train protection system. A December 2022 report by the Comptroller and Auditor General of India warned that the safety department of the railways lacked adequate staffing which could impact the quality of maintenance. The report also stated that the funds allocated towards railway safety were short of the target every year for the last four years and were often misused to cater to other departments such as engineering and Human Resources. However, the Indian Railways claimed that the accident was not a reflection of the safety issues in the system. In February 2023, the principal operating manager of the South Western Railway zone had reported a similar signalling error with the Karnataka Sampark Kranti Express having narrowly escaped a collision and had warned that this could lead to accidents if the issue was not resolved.

== Reactions ==
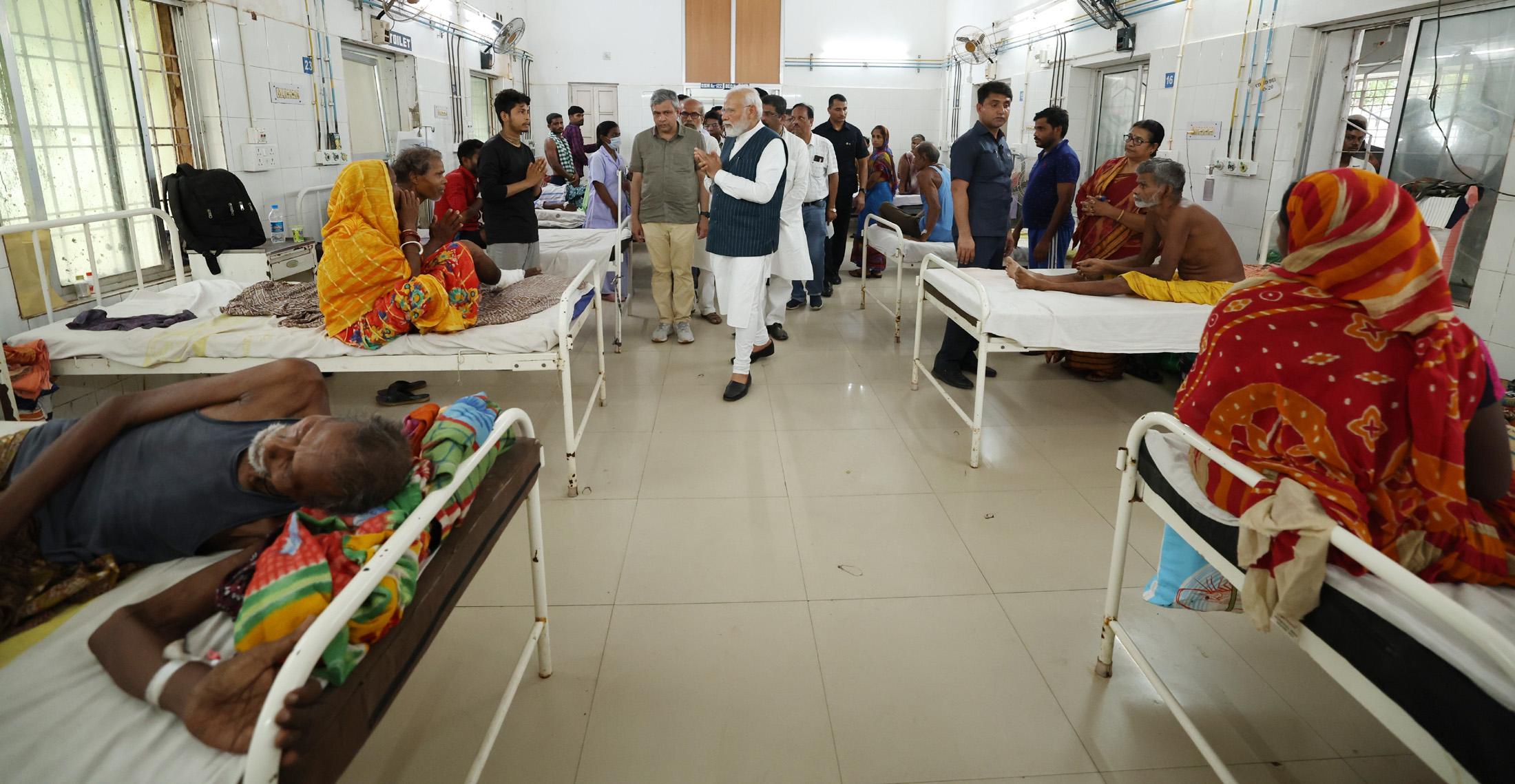
Prime Minister Narendra Modi meeting with the injured at a hospital in Balasore

Narendra Modi, the Prime Minister of India, expressed his grief over the incident and extended his condolences to the grieving families. Home Minister Amit Shah described the incident as "profoundly distressing." Naveen Patnaik, then Chief Minister of Odisha, and Mamata Banerjee, then Chief Minister of West Bengal, expressed their concerns over the disaster. Patnaik and M. K. Stalin, then Chief Minister of Tamil Nadu, announced a day of mourning in their respective states. Leaders from other countries expressed their condolences for the loss of life and extended support to India.

Mallikarjun Kharge, President of the All India Congress Committee and former Minister for Railways, referred to a letter from February which had warned of a similar failure and questioned the Ministry of Railways about their oversight of that crucial warning. He also criticised the government for failing to implement the Kavach anti-collision system and stated that both Prime Minister Modi and Railway Minister Vaishnaw seemed reluctant to acknowledge the existence of problems. Many opposition parties, including the Indian National Congress, Trinamool Congress, Communist Party of India (Marxist), and Communist Party of India demanded the resignation of the railway minister.

In the aftermath of the train crash, misinformation blaming Muslims for the accident circulated on different social media platforms and WhatsApp groups. Odisha Police termed these events as "highly unfortunate" and warned of criminal action against perpetrators of false information. Several right-wing and pro-BJP accounts posted messages that highlighted the past achievements of the government while demanding an investigation into the accident as an act of terror. Political commentator Apoorvanand stated that the accident was used as an opportunity to demonise Muslims.

== See also ==
- List of rail accidents (2020–present)
- List of railway accidents and incidents in India
