= Howrah – SMVT Bengaluru Duronto Express =

Train in India

Howrah Junction – SMVT Bengaluru Duronto Express
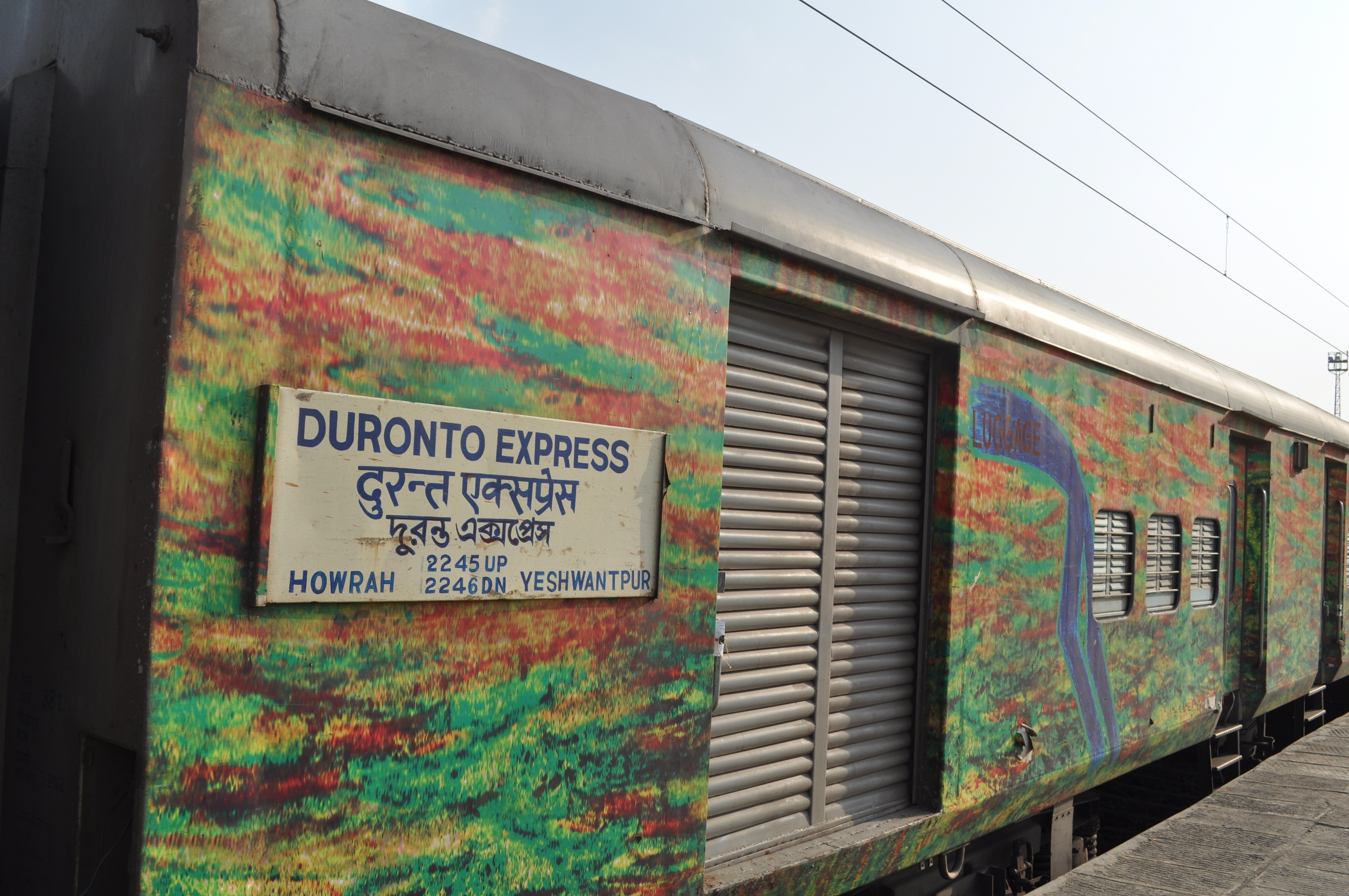

Overview
- Service type: Duronto Express
- First service: 3 January 2010
- Current operator: South Eastern Railways

Route
- Termini: Howrah Junction (HWH); Sir M. Visvesvaraya Terminal, Bengaluru (SMVB)
- Stops: 6
- Distance travelled: 1,937.3 km (1,204 mi)
- Average journey time: 29 hours 00 minutes as 12245 Howrah–SMVT Bengaluru Duronto Express, 28 hours 45 minutes as 12246 SMVT–Howrah Duronto Express
- Service frequency: 5 days a week. 12245 Howrah–SMVT Bengaluru Duronto Express – except Monday & Thursday, 12246 SMVT–Howrah Duronto Express – except Wednesday & Saturday
- Train number: 12245 / 12246

On-board services
- Classes: AC 1st Class, AC 2 tier, AC 3 tier, Sleeper class
- Sleeping arrangements: Yes
- Catering facilities: Pantry car attached
- Observation facilities: LHB coach

Technical
- Rolling stock: Standard Indian Railways Duronto LHB coach
- Track gauge: 1,676 mm (5 ft 6 in)
- Operating speed: 130 km/h (81 mph) (maximum speed), 69 km/h (43 mph) (average speed), including halts

The Howrah – SMVT Bengaluru - Howrah Duronto Express is a Superfast Express train of the Duronto Express category train service of Indian Railways – by South Eastern Railway zone that runs between Howrah Junction in Kolkata, West Bengal and SMVT Bengaluru in Bengaluru, Karnataka, both in India. It is the fastest train between Bengaluru in Karnataka and Howrah in West Bengal.

It operates as train number 12245 from Howrah Junction to SMVT Bengaluru Junction and as train number 12246 in the reverse direction, serving the states of Karnataka, Andhra Pradesh, Odisha & West Bengal. It runs with highly refurbished LHB coach from 11 March 2020. It has been provided with pure Duronto-liveried sleeper coaches and also ax coaches along with the pantry service also .

From 10 August 2022, the train terminus in Bengaluru changed from Yesvantpur Junction to SMVT Bengaluru. On first inaugural run in 2009, the train only made it to Yesvantpur Junction.

== Coaches ==
The 12245 / 46 Howrah – SMVT Bengaluru Duronto Express presently has 1 AC First Class, 1 AC 2 tier, 5 AC 3 AC tier, 11 Sleeper class and 2 EOG coaches. In addition, it carries a pantry car.

As is customary with most train services in India, coach composition may be amended at the discretion of Indian Railways depending on demand. Its LHB coaches replaced Hybrid LHB coach on 13 March 2020 from Howrah..

== Service ==
The 12245 Howrah–SMVT Bengaluru Duronto Express covers the distance of 1,946 kilometres (1,209 mi) in 29 hours 00 mins (67.10 km/h) and in 29 hours 15 mins as 12246 SMVT Bengaluru–Howrah Duronto Express (67.69 km/h (42.06 mph)).

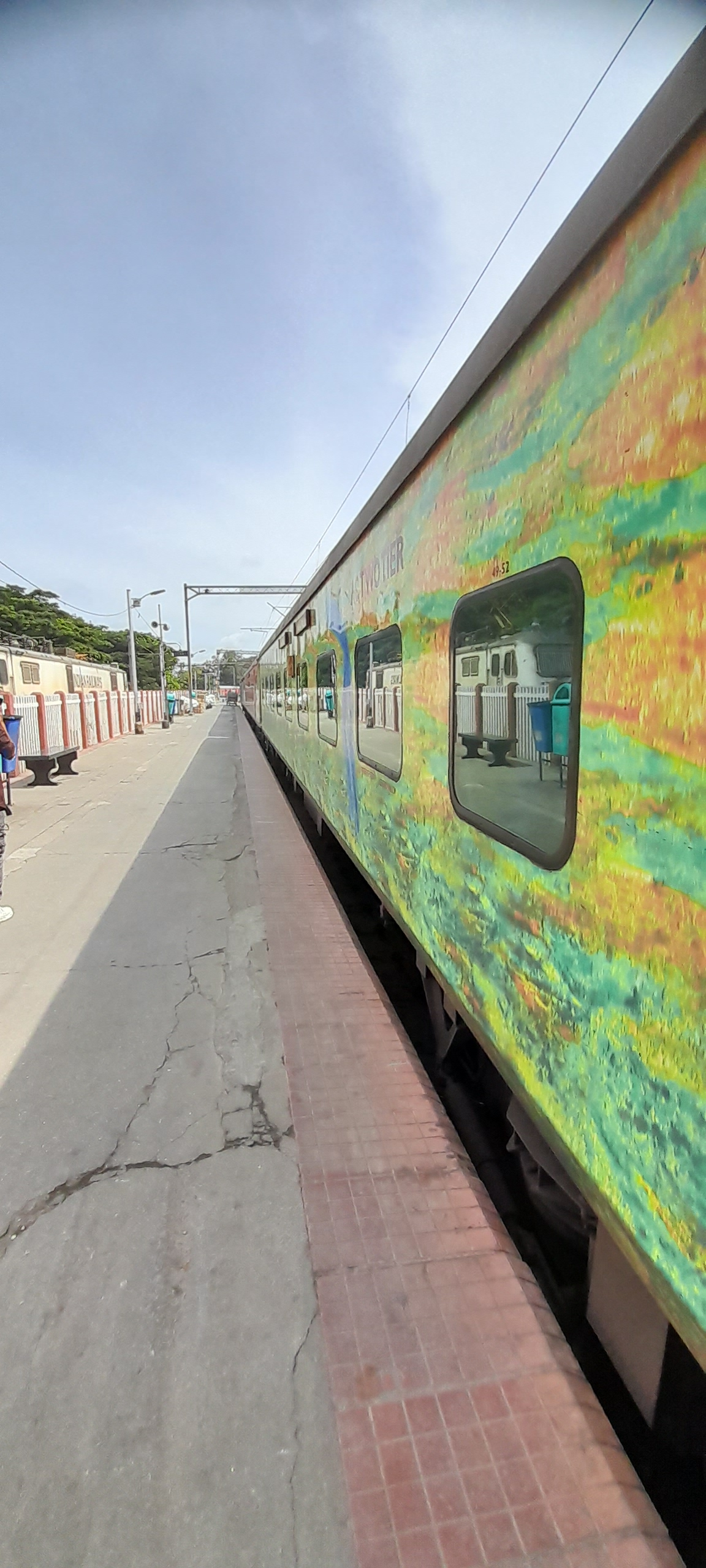
12246 Yesvantapur (now SMVT) - Howrah Duronto Express standing at Yesvantapur Railway Station, prior to its departure

As the average speed of the train is above 55 km/h (34 mph), as per Indian Railways rules, its fare includes a Superfast Express surcharge. And it also same name of Howrah-SMVT Bengaluru Superfast Express

== Routeing and halts ==
The train 12245 / 46 Howrah–SMVT Bengaluru Duronto Express has stops at Bhubaneswar, Vizianagaram Junction, Vijayawada Junction and Renigunta Junction.

| Station code | Station name | 12245 | | Distance from source in km | Day | 12246 | | Distance from source in km | Day |
| Station code | Station name | Arrival | Departure | Distance from source in km | Day | Arrival | Departure | Distance from source in km | Day |
|---|---|---|---|---|---|---|---|---|---|
| HWH | Howrah | Source | 10:50 | 0 | 1 | 16:50 | Destination | 1943 | 2 |
| BBS | Bhubaneswar | 16:20 | 16:30 | 436.8 | 1 | 09:45 | 09:55 | 1502 | 2 |
| VZM | Vizianagaram Junction | 22:05 | 22:15 | 820.0 | 1 | 04:20 | 04:30 | 1121 | 2 |
| BZA | Vijayawada Junction | 04:05 | 04:15 | 1215.4 | 2 | 22:10 | 22:20 | 723 | 1 |
| RU | Renigunta Junction | 9:58 | 10:00 | 1592.4 | 2 | 16:53 | 16:55 | 347 | 1 |
| SMVB | Sir M. Visvesvaraya Terminal, Bengaluru | 15:50 | Destination | 1937.3 | 2 | Source | 11:20 | 0 | 1 |

== Locomotive ==
earlier it was runs by Pune-based WDM-3D It is powered by a Santragachi or Tatanagar-based WAP-7 and WAP-4 for its entire journey.

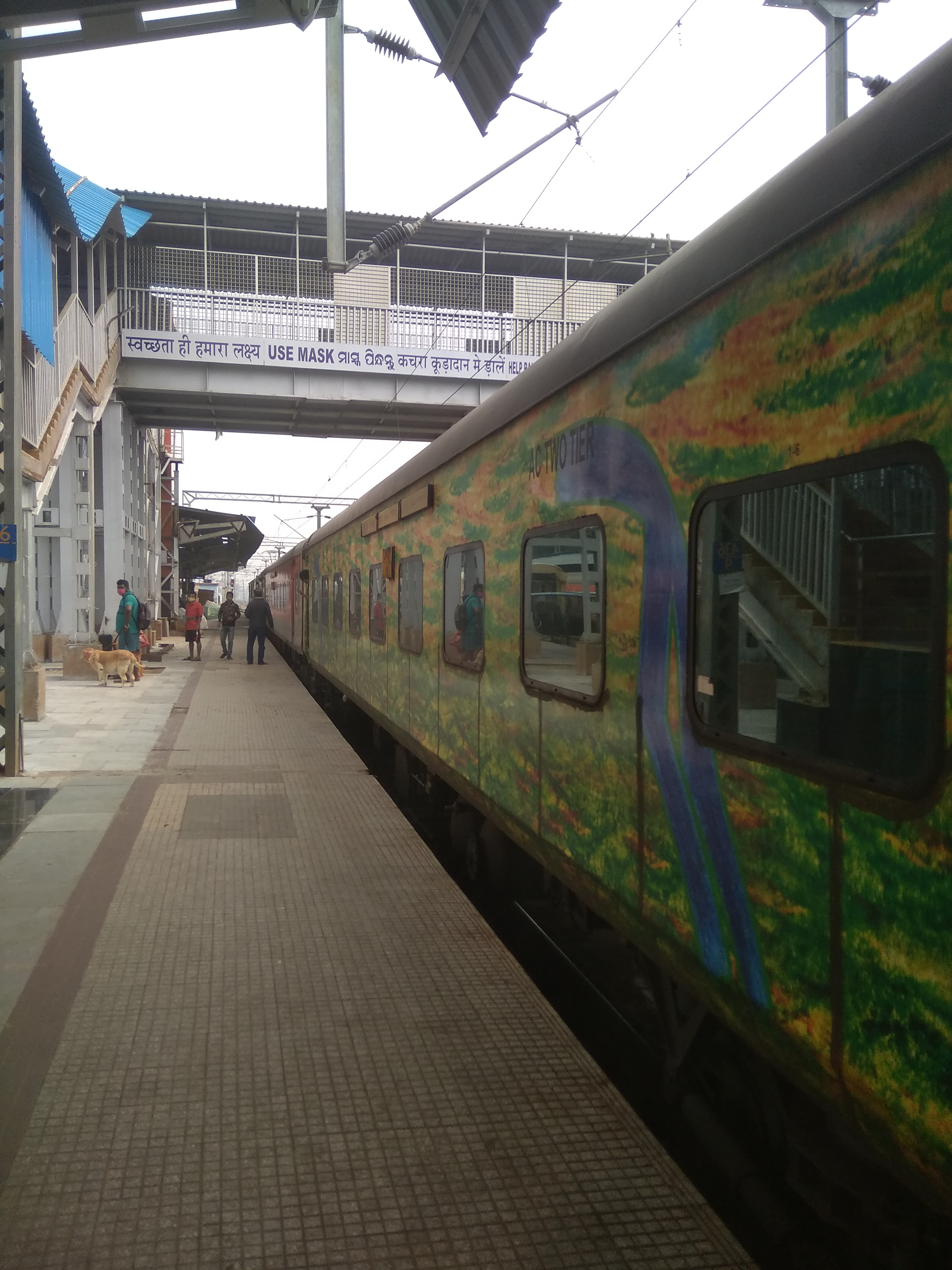
12246 Yesvantapur (now SMVT) - Howrah Duronto Express standing at Bhubneshwar Railway Station

== Timings ==
- 12245 Howrah–SMVT Bengaluru Duronto Express leaves Howrah Junction at 10:50 AM every Tuesday, Wednesday, Friday, Saturday & Sunday and reaches SIR M VISVESVARAYA TERMINAL BENGALURU (SMVB) the next day at 3:50 PM.
- 12246 SMVT Bengaluru–Howrah Duronto Express leaves SIR M VISVESVARAYA TERMINAL BENGALURU (SMVB) at 11:20 AM every Monday, Tuesday, Thursday, Friday & Sunday and reaches Howrah Junction the next day at 4:50 PM.

== Speed ==
Sometimes people become confused because according to Indian Railways Permanent Way Manual (IRPWM) on Indian Railways website or Indian Railway Institute of Civil Engineering website, the BG (Broad Gauge) lines have been classified into six groups ‘A’ to ‘E’ on the basis of the future maximum permissible speeds but it may not be same as present speed. This train runs through Howrah Chennai route up to Gudur and the speed of first section of this route, Howrah – Andul 110 km/h (As per Kharagpur Division System Map or South Eastern Railway System Map - both on South Eastern Railway Website, it is 12.274 km only), Andul- Kharagpur 130 km/h . As per a post on Facebook page of DCM Kharagpur on 19 Nov, 2022, which is shared by Facebook page of DRM Kharagpur whose link is available on South Eastern Railway Website - Kharagpur to Bhadrak is 130 km/h , Bhadrak - Cuttack - Khurda Road - Palasa - Vizianagaram Jn - Simhachalam North 130 km/h [If any part having more than two lines and this speed is lower other than a) at least one up line and b) at least one down line then it is ignored], Simhachalam North - Duvvada (DVD) (By-Pass) - only 2.60 km part (for this part - as of 31 March 2024) 45 kmph (UP)/50 kmph (DN) , Duvvada (DVD) - Vijayawada 130 km/h , Vijayawada - Gudur 130 km/h , Katpadi – Jolarpettai (part of Arakkonam - Jolarpettai) 130 km/h, Jolarpettai to BAIYYAPPANAHALLI JN. (BYPL), where it leaves route towards KSR Bengaluru to go to SIR M VISVESVARAYA TERMINAL BENGALURU (SMVB) is 110 km/h.

== Accidents and incidents ==
- On 2 June 2023, 2023 Odisha train collision, three derailed coaches from the Coromandel Express collided into the adjacent track and whip-lashed the tail end of the SMVT Bengaluru–Howrah Express, which was crossing on the down adjacent line at the same time. Also, two unreserved coaches and the brake van of the SMVT Bengaluru–Howrah Express derailed.The accident is considered one of the deadliest rail accidents in Indian Railways' history with a death count of 296 and over 1,200 injuries although there were no casualties but the passengers in derailed coaches of SMVT Bengaluru–Howrah Express had suffered both minor and major injuries.
