= Baripada (disambiguation) =

Baripada is a city in Odisha, India.

Baripada may refer to:

- Baripada (Odisha Vidhan Sabha constituency), an electoral constituency in the Indian state of Odisha
- Baripada railway station, a railway station in the city
