= Bangriposi railway station =

Railway station in Odisha, India

Bangriposi

General information
- Location: Bangriposi, Odisha; India
- Coordinates: 22°08′46″N 86°32′20″E
- System: Indian Railways station
- Owner: Ministry of Railways, Indian Railways
- Line: Rupsa-Baripada-Bangriposi line
- Platforms: 2
- Tracks: 2

Construction
- Structure type: Standard (on ground)
- Parking: Yes

Other information
- Status: Functioning
- Station code: BGY
- Zone(s): South Eastern Railway
- Division(s): Kharagpur
Location
- Location within India Location within Odisha

Bangriposi railway station is a NSG-5 categorized Railway station on the South Eastern Railway network in the state of Odisha, India. It serves Bangriposi Town. Its code is BGY. It is a Terminus type station & has two platforms. Passenger, Express and Superfast trains halt at Bangriposi railway station. Before becoming Broad Gauge, this line used to end at Talbandh, located 27.8 kilometres (17.3 mi) away from Bangriposi. It was part of erstwhile Balasore-Simlipal Narrow Gauge Light Railway

== Major trains ==
- Bangriposi - Balasore Passenger Train
- Bangriposi - Puri Superfast Express

== Major Projects ==
- Bangriposi - Gorumahisani Line. It is a new proposed line to connect Balasore & Tatanagar.

== See also ==
- Mayurbhanj district
