= Bahanaga Bazar railway station =

Railway station in Odisha

General information
- Location: Asimila, Bahanaga, Balasore district, Odisha; India
- Coordinates: 21°20′10″N 86°45′41″E
- Elevation: 19 m (62 ft)
- System: Passenger train station
- Owner: Indian Railways
- Operator: South Eastern Railway
- Lines: Howrah–Chennai main line Kharagpur–Puri line
- Platforms: 3
- Tracks: 4

Construction
- Structure type: Standard (on ground station)

Other information
- Status: Functioning
- Station code: BNBR
- Zone(s): South Eastern Railway zone
- Division(s): Kharagpur railway division

History
- Opened: 1901
- Former names: East Coast State Railway

Services
Preceding station	Indian Railways	Following station
Panpana towards Howrah Junction	South Eastern Railway zone Howrah–Chennai main line	Soro towards Chennai Central
Location
- Location within India Location within Odisha

Bahanaga Bazar railway station is a railway station on Kharagpur–Puri line, part of the Howrah–Chennai main line under Kharagpur railway division of South Eastern Railway zone. It is situated at Asimila, Bahanaga in Balasore district in the Indian state of Odisha. The station serves 14 trains daily, more than half of which remain within the state of Odisha.

== History ==
In between 1893 and 1896 the East Coast State Railway constructed Howrah–Chennai main line. Kharagpur–Puri branch was finally opened for public in 1901. The route was electrified in several phases. In 2005, Howrah–Chennai route was completely electrified.

== Incidents ==
On 2 June 2023, 288 people were killed and 1,175 were injured after trains collided near the station and it is India's deadliest railway crash in over 20 years. The Chennai-bound Coromandel Express was incorrectly shunted into the loop line and hit a stationary freight train at the speed of 128 km/h, and the derailed coaches fell on the down line where the Howrah-bound SMVT Bengaluru–Howrah Superfast Express side dashed the General & Sleeper Coaches of Coromandel Express. Rear two coaches of SMVT Bengaluru-Howrah Superfast Express derailed.
