= Rupsa–Baripada–Bangriposi line =

Rupsa–Baripada–Bangriposi railway line
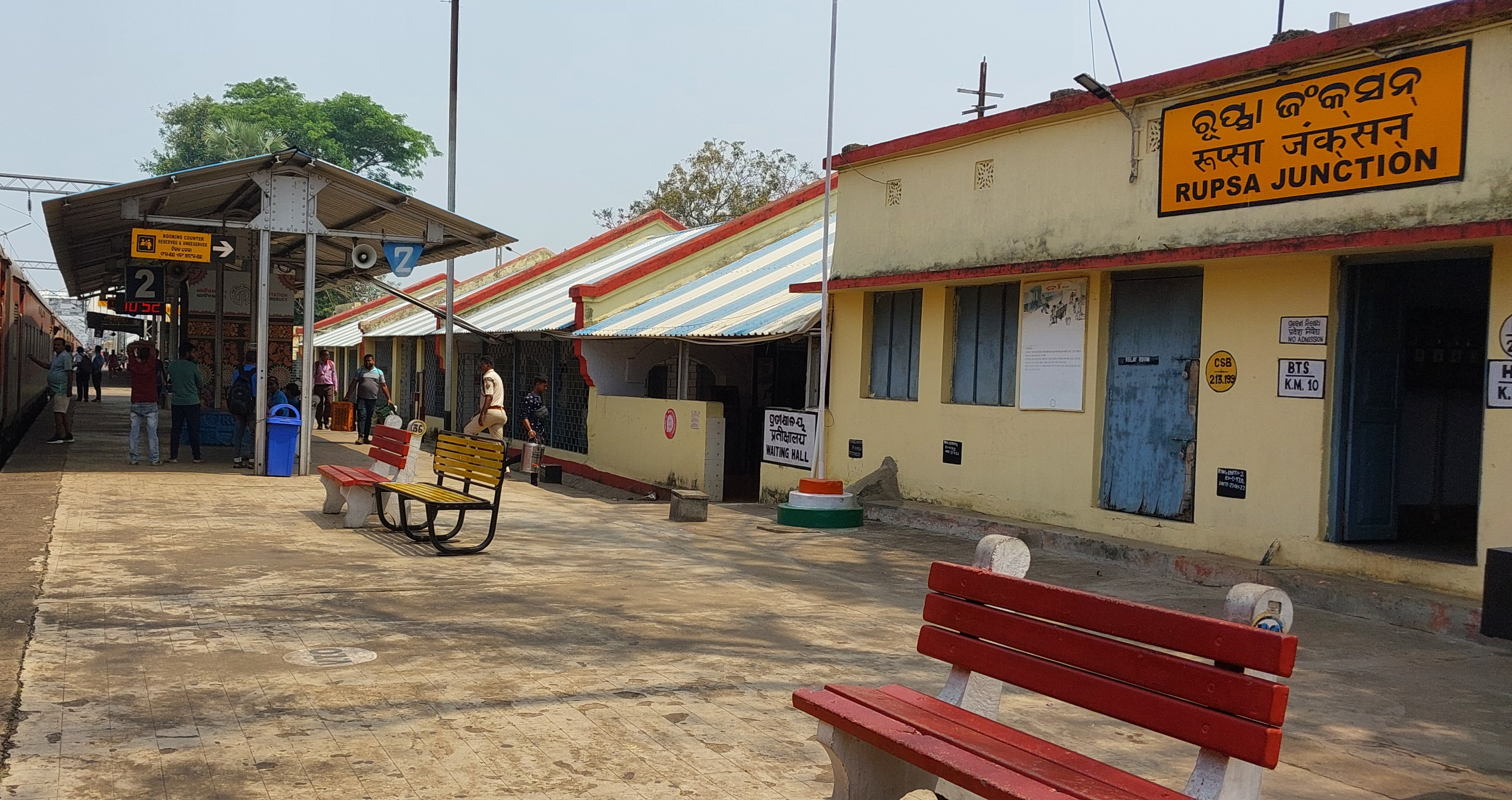
- Rupsa Junction railway station

Overview
- Status: Operational
- Owner: Indian Railways
- Locale: Odisha, India
- Termini: Rupsa Junction; Bangriposi

Service
- Type: Branch line
- Operator: South Eastern Railway zone

Technical
- Number of tracks: Single
- Character: Passenger and freight
- Track gauge: 5 ft 6 in (1,676 mm)
- Electrification: No

The Rupsa–Baripada–Bangriposi railway line is a railway line in the state of Odisha, India. The line connects Rupsa Junction with Bangriposi via Baripada, serving as an important rail link for the Mayurbhanj district and surrounding regions. It is operated by the South Eastern Railway zone of Indian Railways.

== History ==
The Rupsa–Baripada–Bangriposi railway line was constructed during the British colonial period, by Sriram Chandra Bhanj Deo, to improve connectivity between the mineral-rich and forested regions of northern Odisha and the main railway network. This operation was lead and managed by the Dewan of Mayurbhanj Mohini Mohan Dhar. The line primarily facilitated the transport of forest produce, minerals, and passengers from the interior regions of Mayurbhanj to major railway junctions.

Over time, the line became an important means of transportation for local passengers, contributing to regional economic development and improved accessibility.

== Route ==
The railway line originates at Rupsa Junction, on the Howrah–Chennai main line, and proceeds towards Baripada, the district headquarters of Mayurbhanj district. From Baripada, the line extends further north to terminate at Bangriposi.

== Stations ==
Major stations on the line include:

- Rupsa Junction
- Baripada
- Bangriposi

== Operations ==
The line supports passenger services and limited freight movement. It plays a crucial role in connecting rural and tribal areas of northern Odisha with the broader railway network.

== Gauge and infrastructure ==
The Rupsa–Baripada–Bangriposi railway line is constructed on broad gauge (1,676 mm). The line is a single-track, non-electrified route and is maintained by the South Eastern Railway zone.

== Importance ==
The railway line is vital for:

- Passenger mobility in Mayurbhanj district
- Access to education, healthcare, and markets
- Economic development of northern Odisha
- Connectivity to the Howrah–Chennai main line

== See also ==
- Indian Railways
- South Eastern Railway zone
- Howrah–Chennai main line
