= Byree railway station =

Railway station in Odisha, India

General information
- Location: Bairi, Jajpur district, Odisha; India
- Coordinates: 20.628257°N 86.034947°E
- Elevation: 32 m (105 ft)
- System: Passenger train station
- Owner: Indian Railways
- Operator: East Coast Railway
- Lines: Howrah–Chennai main line Kharagpur–Puri line
- Platforms: 5
- Tracks: 5

Construction
- Structure type: Standard (on ground station)

Other information
- Status: Functioning
- Station code: BYY
- Zone(s): East Coast Railway zone
- Division(s): Khurda Road railway division

History
- Opened: 1901
- Former names: East Coast State Railway

Services
Preceding station	Indian Railways	Following station
Barithengarh towards Howrah Junction	East Coast Railway zone Howrah–Chennai main line	Sri Jhadeshwar Road towards Chennai Central
Location
- Location within India Location within Odisha

Byree railway station is a railway station on Kharagpur–Puri line, part of the Howrah–Chennai main line under Khurda Road railway division of East Coast Railway zone. It is situated at Bairi in Jajpur district in the Indian state of Odisha.

== History ==
In between 1893 and 1896 the East Coast State Railway constructed Howrah–Chennai main line. Kharagpur–Puri branch was finally opened for public in 1901. The route was electrified in several phases. In 2005, Howrah–Chennai route was completely electrified.
