= Rupsa, India =

Rupsa
- Town
- Location in Odisha, India
- Coordinates: 21°37′N 87°1′E
- Country: India
- State: Odisha
- District: Balasore

Population (2024)
  - Total: 42,317

Languages
  - Official: Odia, Hindi, English
- Time zone: UTC+5:30 (IST)
- PIN: 756028
- Vehicle registration: OD
- Climate: Aw (Köppen)
- Avg. summer temperature: 45 °C (113 °F)
- Avg. winter temperature: 12 °C (54 °F)
- Website: odisha.gov.in

Rupsa is a town of Balasore district in Odisha.

== History ==
The Mayurbhanj State Railway was started by the erstwhile ruler of Mayurbhanj State Maharja Shri Sriram Chandra Bhanj Deo. The first section of 52 km from Rupsa Junction to Baripada was opened for traffic on 20 January 1905. Rupsa was the junction with the Bengal Nagpur Railway’s 1,676 mm (5 ft 6 in) line. An agreement was signed on 2 December 1918, between the Mayurbhanj State and Mayurbhanj Railway Company, for extending the line to Talband, 61.5 km away. This section was opened on 15 July 1920. From that date, the management of the entire Rupsa-Talband section was handed over to Mayurbhanj Railway Company, formed in 1920 to take over this line.

== Educational institutions ==
- Nilamani Mahavidyalaya, Rupsa
- Govt. High School, Hirapur, Rupsa
- Harihar M. E. School, Rupsa
- Mohapatra High School, Rupsa, Kasipada Panchayat high school Rupsa
- Jogendra Higher Secondary School
- Udaya Nath Mohapatra Uchha Vidya Niketan, Barapal
- Bakharabad upme school

== Festivals celebrated ==
Apart from the normal festival celebrated there are some festivals celebrated with much attention. These are:

- Rupsa Mohastav
- Vijayadasami

== Highways and railway station ==
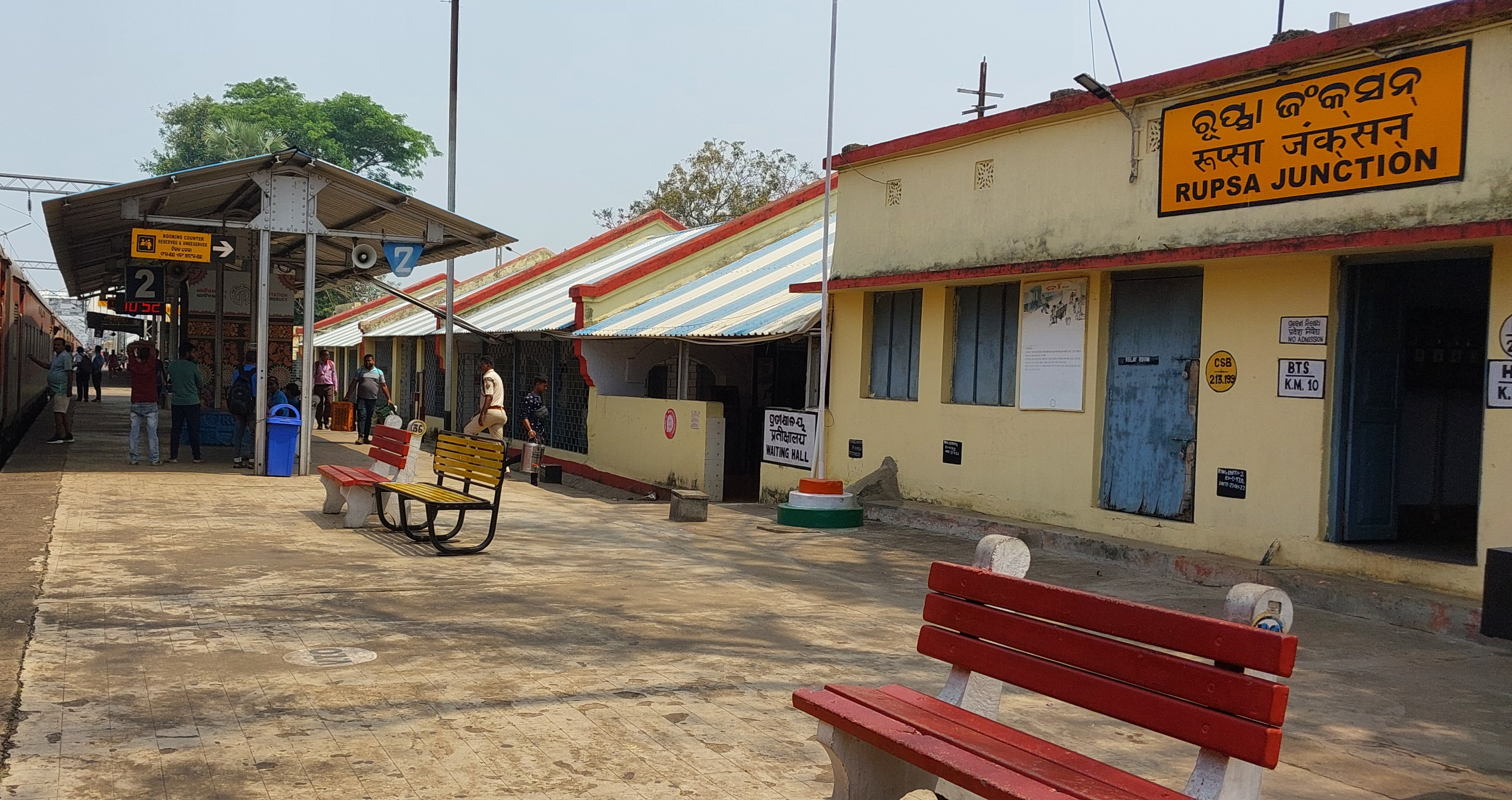
Rupsa Junction railway station

- NH 16 Highway Connect Rupsa to Balasore and Kolkata
- Rupsa Junction Connects South Eastern Railway To Mayurbhanj District

== Healthcare institutions ==
- Rupsa Govt Hospital

== Industry presence ==
- Rupsa Jute Mill (located near Rupsa Junction)
