= Mayurbhanj State Railway =

Railway line in British India

- Industry: Railways
- Founded: 1905
- Headquarters: Baripada, India
- Area served: Eastern India

Mayurbhanj State Railway (MSR) was a 2 ft 6 in (762 mm) narrow gauge railway owned by Mayurbhanj State in British India.

== History ==
Mayurbhanj State railway from Rupsa to Baripada and Badampahar to Kalimati (Jamshedpur), 1914

The railway was built by the erstwhile ruler of Mayurbhanj State, Maharaja Sriram Chandra Bhanj Deo. The first section of 52 km from Rupsa to Baripada was opened for traffic on 20 January 1905. Rupsa was the junction with Bengal Nagpur Railway's 1,676 mm (5 ft 6 in) broad gaugeline. An agreement was signed on 2 December 1918, for extending the line to Talband, 61.5 km away. This section was opened on 15 July 1920. The line was managed through managing agents, Hoare Miller & Co. of Calcutta and was operated by the BNR.

MSR chose 20 ton 0-6-4T locomotives, designated as 'ML' class. The first two of these (No-691, 692) were built by Kerr, Stuart and Company. Later in 1924, two more locomotives (No-693, 694) built by the same company were added. These locos were later transferred to Naupada shed of Parlakimedi Light Railway, renamed PL class and heavier 'CC' class 4-6-2 locos of Satpura Railway were introduced on MSR. These were built by North British Locomotive Company, Glasgow. Later ZE class locomotives built by M/S Corpet-Louvet, M/S Krauss Maffei and M/S Kawasaki were introduced. All locos were homed at Baripada loco shed.

After Independence, when the railways were regrouped, MSR was merged with BNR along with eastern divisions of the East Indian Railway to create the Eastern Railway on 14 April 1952.

== Conversion to broad gauge ==
The MSR was converted to 1,676 mm (5 ft 6 in) broad gauge in 2004.
