= Baneswara Temple, Balasore =

Coordinates: 21°29′N 86°53′E

Baneswara Temple is a Hindu temple in Balasore, Odisha, India. It is one of the oldest in the city. The temple is maintained by group of people called Pujaka.
