= Baripada railway station =

Railway station in Odisha, India

Baripada
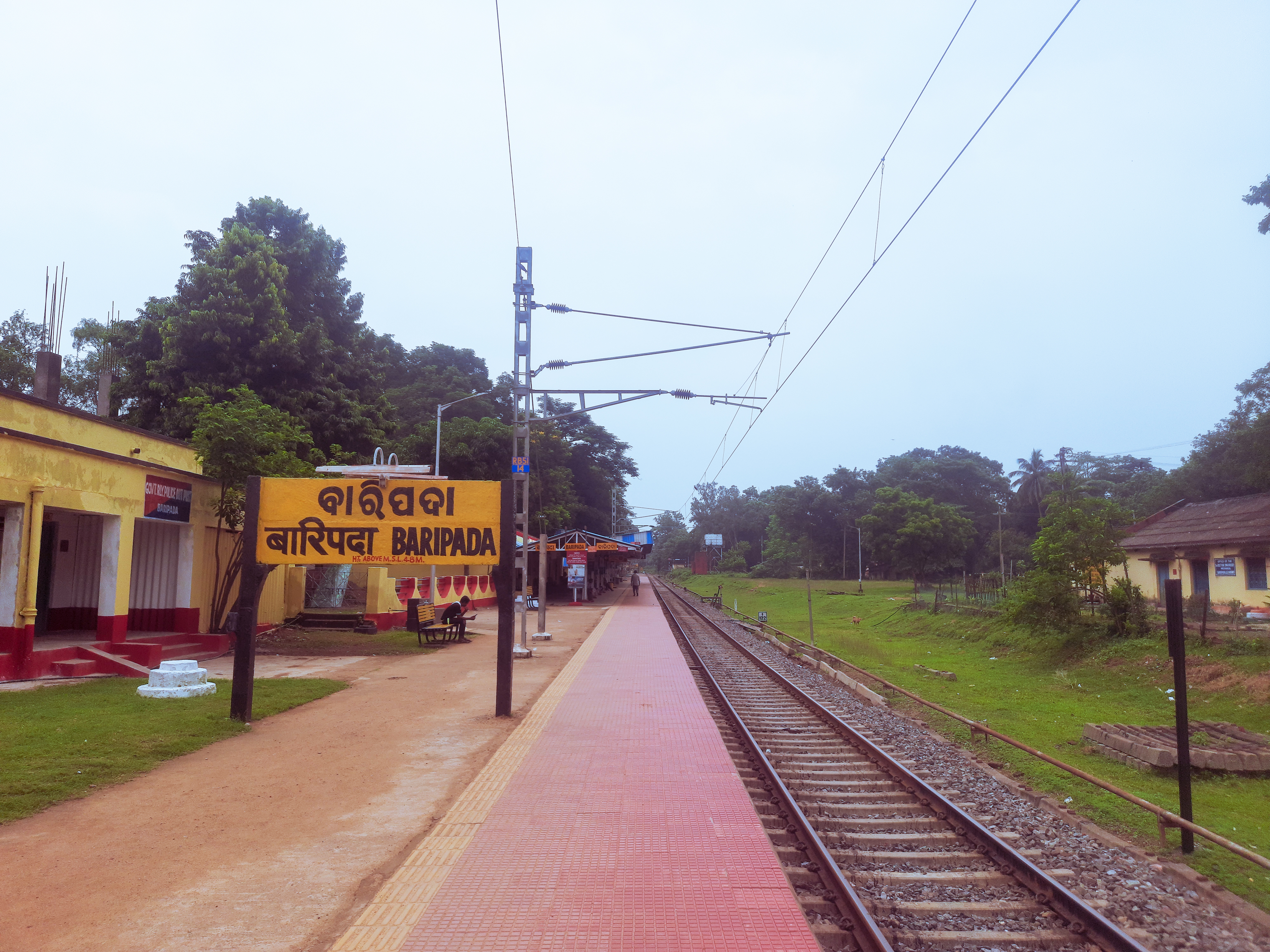

General information
- Location: Baripada, Odisha; India
- Coordinates: 21°55′24″N 86°44′15″E
- Elevation: 36 m (118 ft)
- System: Indian Railways station
- Operator: South Eastern Railway
- Line: Rupsa–Bangriposi line
- Platforms: 1
- Tracks: 5 ft 6 in (1,676 mm) broad gauge

Construction
- Structure type: At grade
- Parking: Available

Other information
- Status: Operational
- Station code: BPO
- Zone(s): South Eastern Railway
- Division(s): Kharagpur

History
- Opened: 1905
- Former names: Mayurbhanj State Railway

Services
Preceding station	Indian Railways	Following station
Jamsole towards ?	South Eastern Railway zone Rupsa–Bangriposi line	Bhanjpur towards ?
Location
- Location within Odisha Location within India

The Baripada Railway Station serves Baripada, the headquarters of Mayurbhanj district in the Indian state of Odisha.

== History ==
In 1905, Mayurbhanj State Railway linked Rupsa with Baripada on the Howrah–Chennai main line through a narrow-gauge line, then extended it further. The Rupsa-Baripada-Bangriposi line was converted to broad gauge between 1996 and 2006. Currently, Train No. 12891 leaves Baripada at 5:10 AM and reaches Bhubaneswar at 10:00 AM. The return train leaves Bhubaneswar at 5:10 PM and reaches Baripada at 10:00 PM.

== Simlipal National Park ==
Jashipur via NH 6 is normally considered to be the gateway to Simlipal National Park, but it can also be reached from Baripada, which is 50 km away. The normal entry is through the Pithabhata check gate. In addition to wildlife, Simlipal National Park offers views of the waterfalls Joranda Falls and Barehipani Falls.
