= Balasore railway station =

Railway station in Odisha, India

Balasore Baleshwar

General information
- Location: Station Road, Balasore, Odisha; India
- Coordinates: 21°30′05″N 86°55′13″E
- Elevation: 16 m (52 ft)
- System: Indian Railways station
- Owner: Indian Railways
- Operator: South Eastern Railway
- Lines: Howrah–Chennai main line Balasore–Gopinathpur Nilgiri line
- Platforms: 4
- Tracks: 5 ft 6 in (1,676 mm) broad gauge

Construction
- Structure type: At grade
- Parking: Available
- Accessible: Yes

Other information
- Status: Functioning
- Station code: BLS
- Zone(s): South Eastern Railway
- Division(s): Kharagpur

History
- Opened: 1896
- Electrified: Yes, Double electrified line
- Former names: Bengal Nagpur Railway

Passengers
- Daily more than 150000

Services
Preceding station	Indian Railways	Following station
Tikirapal Halt towards Howrah Junction	South Eastern Railway zone Howrah–Chennai main line	Nilgiri Road towards Chennai Central
Location
- Location within Odisha Location within India

Balasore railway station, officially Baleshwar railway station, is a railway station in Balasore city of Odisha. It serves Balasore, Remuna, Chandipur and Bhograi in Balasore district and other districts like Mayurbhanj, Kendujhargarh and Bhadrak for boarding major trains like Duronto, Rajdhani, Shatabdi and Humsafar Express and many more trains that do not stop at Bhadrak railway station. It is an A-grade station.

== Facilities ==
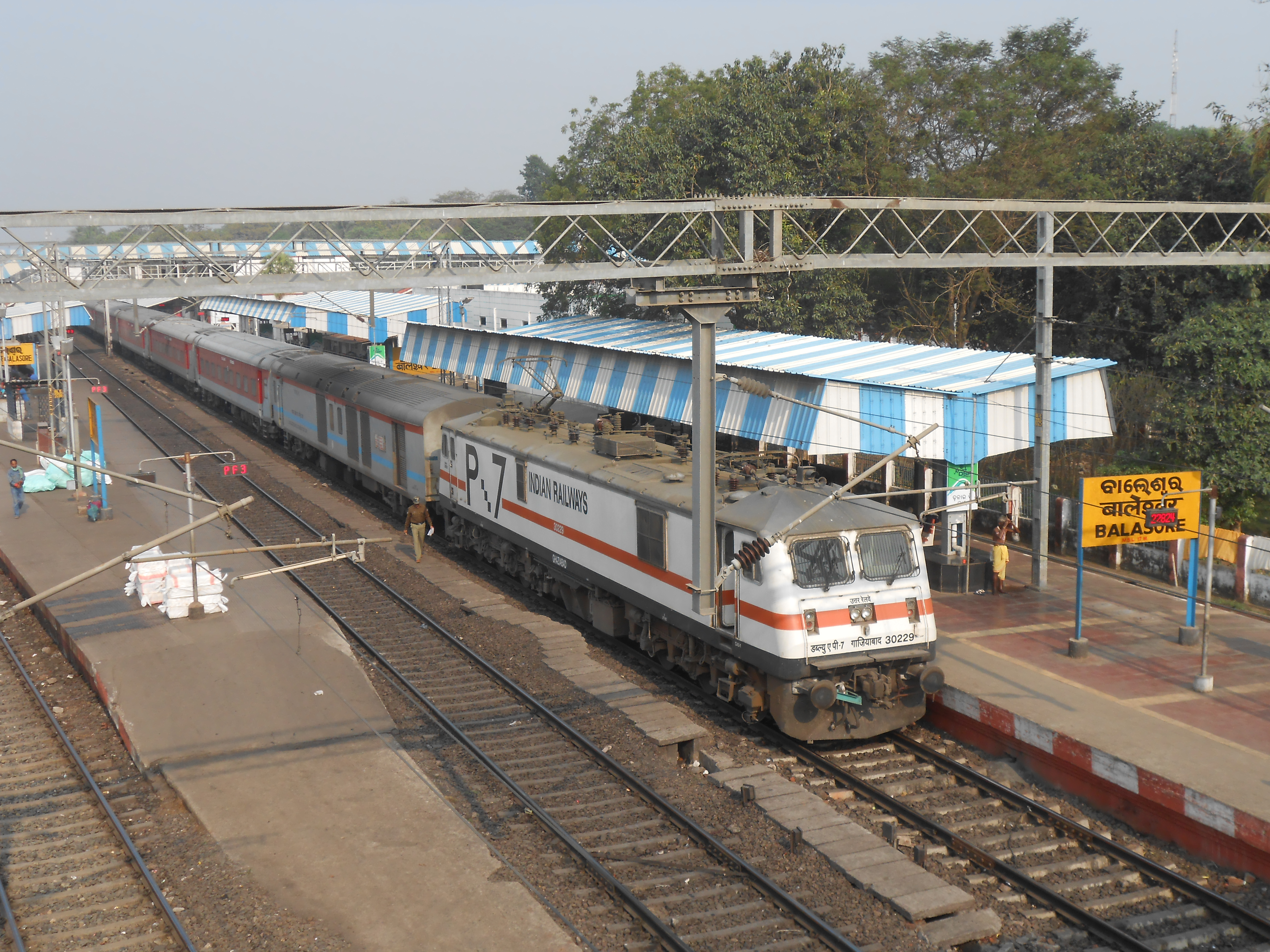
New Delhi–Bhubaneswar Rajdhani Express at Balasore railway station

There are four platforms in Balasore railway station. Generally platforms 1,2 and 3 are used for long-distance trains like express and mail trains and platform no. 4 is used for suburban and local DEMU, MEMU trains.

Balasore railway station has a computerised reservation office, cloak room, waiting room, retiring room, and refreshment room. This station is provided with Railwire free wifi by Google. One can download movies and music at high speed for 30 minutes after which speed will be reduced. Balasore railway station has a double-bedded air-conditioned retiring room, 6 double bedded non-air-conditioned retiring rooms and a six-bedded dormitory, many small shops are available at all the platforms, water vending machine is also available in all platforms.

== Passenger movement and train performance ==
Balasore railway station is an A-grade station. Balasore railway station serves around 130,000 passengers every day. It is a major station in the state of Odisha where all the trains going from Howrah to Chennai make a scheduled stop. Many trains like Bhubaneswar rajdhani express, Bhubneswar-New Delhi duronto express and Howrah–Yashvanantapur Humsafar express, Puri-Howrah shatabdi express halt here. Other trains like Antodaya express and other AC superfast, mail trains have a regular halt in this station. Though this station lacks connectivity to some western states but one can easily get connecting trains from any major station like Bhubaneswar, kharagpur which have frequent connectivity from Balasore railway station. There is a long-standing demand of direct train to Mumbai from Balasore which has not yet been resolved.

== History ==
During the period 1893 to 1896, 1,287 km (800 mi) of East Coast State Railway was built and opened to traffic. Bengal Nagpur Railway's line to Cuttack was opened on 1 January 1899. The 514 km (319 mi) long northern section of the East Coast State Railway was merged with BNR in 1902.
