= Kharagpur–Puri line =

Railway route of India

Kharagpur–Puri Line including Cuttack–Paradip Line
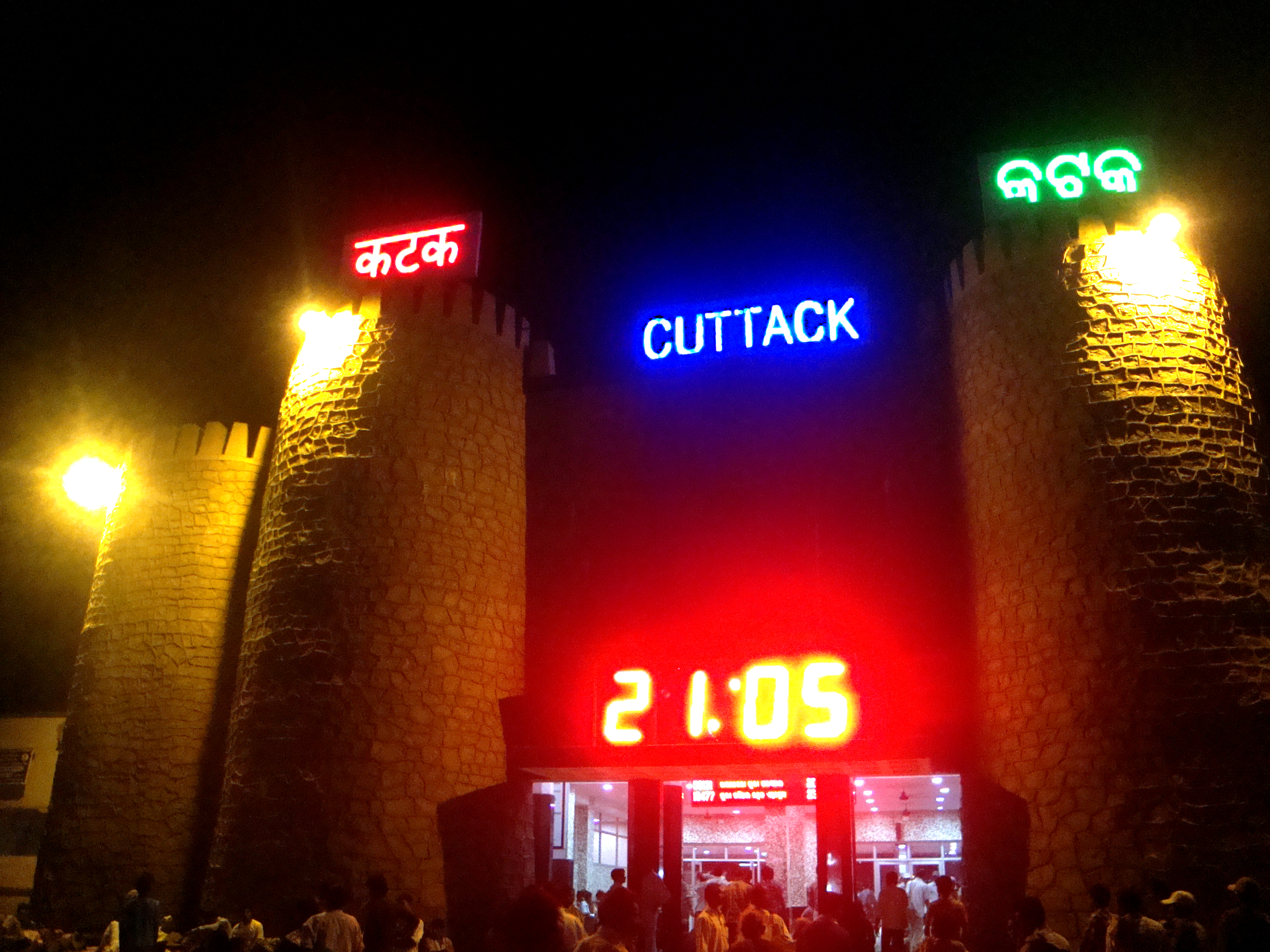
- Cuttack Junction is an important railway station on Kharagpur-Puri line

Overview
- Status: Operational
- Owner: Indian Railways
- Locale: Odisha, West Bengal
- Termini: Kharagpur; Puri

Service
- Operator(s): East Coast Railway, South Eastern Railway

History
- Opened: 1901

Technical
- Track length: 407 km (253 mi)
- Number of tracks: 2
- Track gauge: 5 ft 6 in (1,676 mm) broad gauge
- Electrification: Yes
- Operating speed: up to 130 km/h (81 mph)

The Kharagpur–Puri Line is a railway line connecting Kharagpur in the Indian state of West Bengal and Puri in Odisha. The total line can be divided into sections. The Kharagpur–Khurda Road portion of this line, which is a part of the Howrah–Chennai main line and Khurda Road - Puri portion.

== Kharagpur–Khurda Road Section ==
This section lies on the main Howrah-Chennai line. The length of this section is 363.1 km, and there are 65 intermediary stations. The important stations in this sections are Balasore, Bhadrak, Jajpur Keonjhar Road, Cuttack Junction and Bhubaneswar.

== Khurda Road- Puri Section ==
The length of this section is 43.8 km, and there are 9 intermediary stations.

== Geography ==
The Kharagpur–Puri line traverses the northern part of the Eastern Coastal Plains crossing such rivers as Subarnarekha, Baitarani, Brahmani and Mahanadi. The coastal plains lying between the Eastern Ghats and the Bay of Bengal are fertile agricultural lands with high density of population. The line enters the large delta of the 900 km (559 mi)-long Mahanadi, with a series of channels, near Cuttack.

== History ==
=== Howrah–Chennai main line ===
During the period 1893 to 1896, 1,287 km (800 mi) of East Coast State Railway was built and opened to traffic. It necessitated construction of some of the largest bridges across rivers like Brahmani, Kathajodi, Kuakhai and Birupa. Bengal Nagpur Railway's line to Cuttack was fully opened after completion of the bridge over the Mahanadi in 1901.

The 514 km (319 mi) long northern section of the East Coast State Railway was merged with BNR in 1902.

The Khurda Road–Puri section was opened to traffic on 1 February 1897.

The Khurda Road–Puri section have double lines in operation since July 2015.

=== Mayurbhanj links ===
"Work has been begun by the Bengal–Nagpur Railway on the construction of a line from Kalimati to Gurumaishini hill, from which the iron ore is to be obtained."(Kalimati later became Jamshedpur/Tatanagar). That was the railway's early foray into Mayurbhanj State. (Details of the Tatanagar–Gourmahisani line are available in Asansol–Tatanagar–Kharagpur line.)

However, even before that Mayurbhanj State Railway linked Rupsa on the Howrah–Chennai main line with Baripada through a narrow-gauge line in 1905 and then extended it further. In his The East Coast, Ian Manning has jotted down the experience of his travel in the narrow-gauge train. The Rupsa–Baripada–Bangriposi line was converted to broad gauge between 1996 and 2006.

=== Paradip and other port links ===
The foundation stone of the Cuttack–Paradip line was laid by Prime Minister Jawaharlal Nehru on 31 January 1962. It was opened to traffic in 1973.

Opened in 1966, Paradip Port has laid out plans to expand its cargo-handling capacity from 76 million tonnes annually to 237 million tonnes by 2020. The entrance and approach channels are being deepened to handle vessels up to 1,25,000 DWT (slightly smaller than capesize vessels).

Dhamra Port, opened in 2011, has the capacity to handle capesize vessels up to 1,80,000 DWT. It is linked to Bhadrak with a 62 km long railway line. It is a joint venture of Larsen & Toubro and Tata Steel.

Apart from Dhamra, new ports are coming up at Kirtania at the mouth of the Subarnarekha, Astaranga in Puri district and Chudamani in Bhadrak district The 41 km long newly sanctioned line connecting Digha in West Bengal with Jaleswar on the Kharagpur–Puri line is expected to serve the new port at Kirtania. Astaranga port will be connected to Bhubaneswar New Station on the Khurda Road–Puri line.

=== Coalfield and iron ore mines links ===
Talcher Coalfield with reserves of 38.65 billion tonnes, the highest in India, is located on the Cuttack–Sambalpur line.

The Barbil–Joda region is the highest iron ore-producing region in the country, with an annual output of around 40 million tonnes of lump and fines. This region, as well as the Daitari-Kalinganagar mining-industrial region is linked through the Padapahar–Jakhapura and Kharasuan–Barbil lines. (See Tatanagar–Bilaspur section for more information.)

== Electrification ==
Howrah–Chennai Mail was the first train in South Eastern Railway to be hauled by a diesel engine (WDM-1) in 1965.

The Howrah–Chennai route was completely electrified by 2005. Electrification was in stages. Hijli–Bakhrabad was electrified in 1998–99, Bakhrabad–Jaleswar in 2000–01, Jaleswar–Amarda Road in 2001–02, Amarda Road–Balasore in 2002–03, Balasore–Ranital in 2003–04, Bhadrak–Kenduapara in 1998–99, Kapilas Road–Rajatgarh in 2003–04, Rajatgarh–Barang in 2002–03, Barang–Bhubaneswar in 2002–03, and Bhubaneswar-Khurda Road in 2001–02.

== Speed limits ==
The entire Kharagpur–Visakhapatnam–Vijayawada main line is classified as a "Group B" line which can take speeds up to 130 km/h. Some of the branch lines such as Talcher–Rajatgarh–Salegaon–Nergundi, Cuttack–Paradeep, Radhakishorepur–Rajathgarh–Barang, Kapilas Road–Salegaon and Radhakishorepur–Machapur are classified as Group 'D Spl' lines. These sections already carry high traffic density or are likely to grow substantially in future. The sanctioned speed limit for such lines is 100 km/h.

== Railway reorganization ==
The Bengal Nagpur Railway was nationalized in 1944.Eastern Railway was formed on 14 April 1952 with the portion of East Indian Railway Company east of Mughalsarai and the Bengal Nagpur Railway. In 1955, South Eastern Railway was carved out of Eastern Railway. It comprised lines mostly operated by BNR earlier. Amongst the new zones started in April 2003 were East Coast Railway and South East Central Railway. Both these railways were carved out of South Eastern Railway.

== Passenger movement ==
Kharagpur, Cuttack, Bhubaneswar and Puri, on this line, are amongst the top hundred booking stations of Indian Railway.

== Accidents ==
In June 2023, at least 280 were killed after trains collided near Bahanaga Bazar railway station.
