= Balasore district =

- District
- Baleshwar district
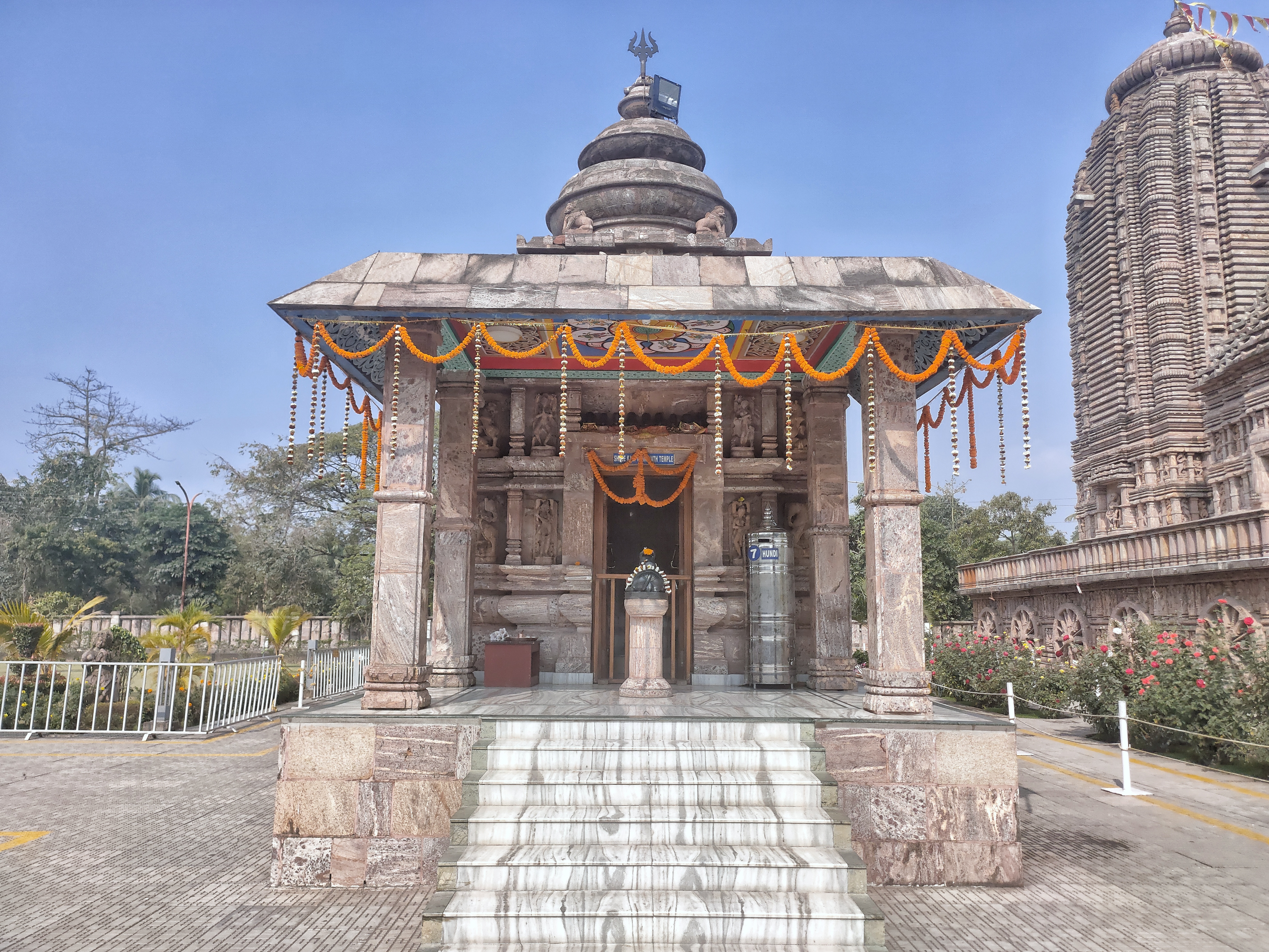
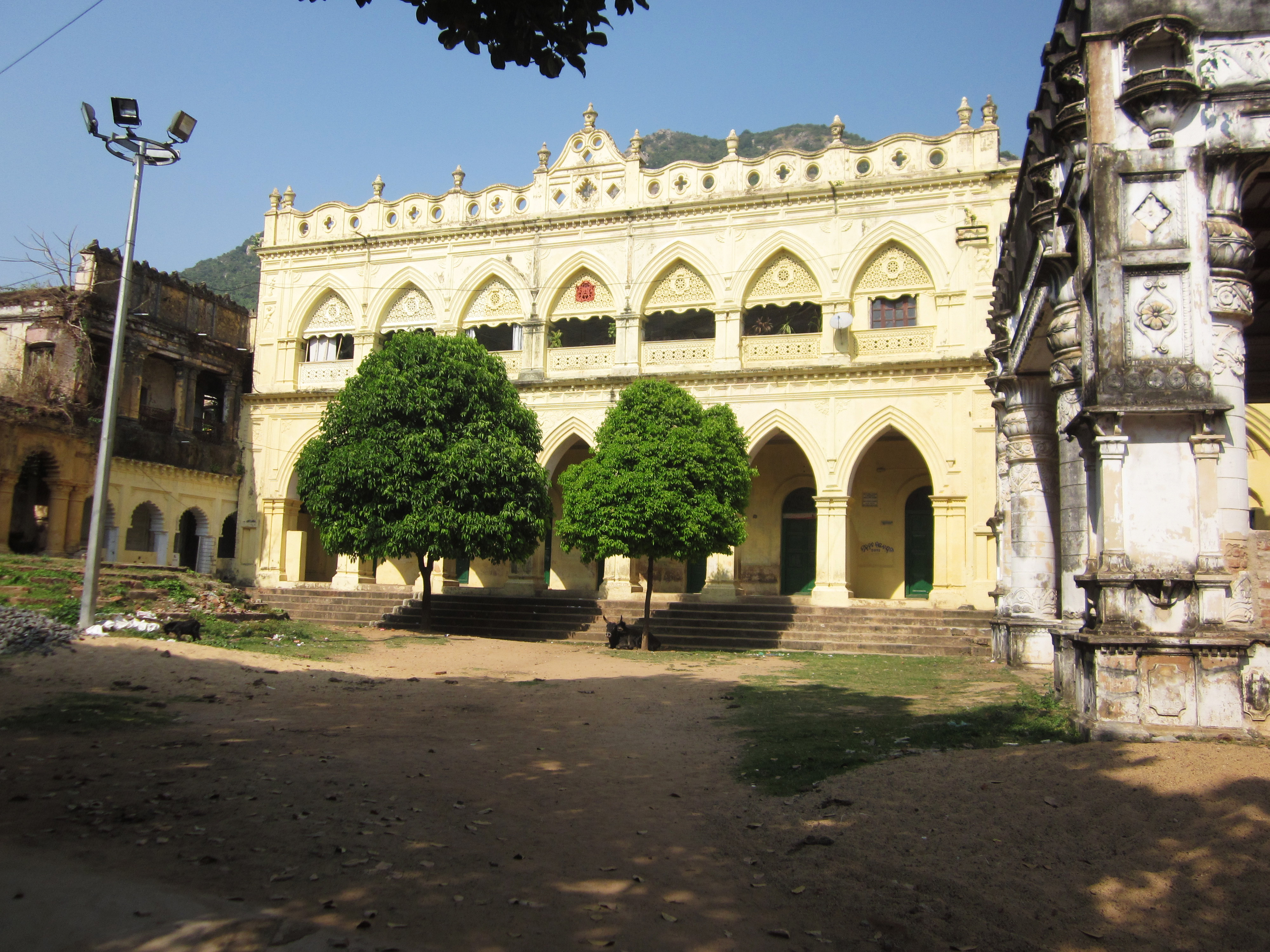
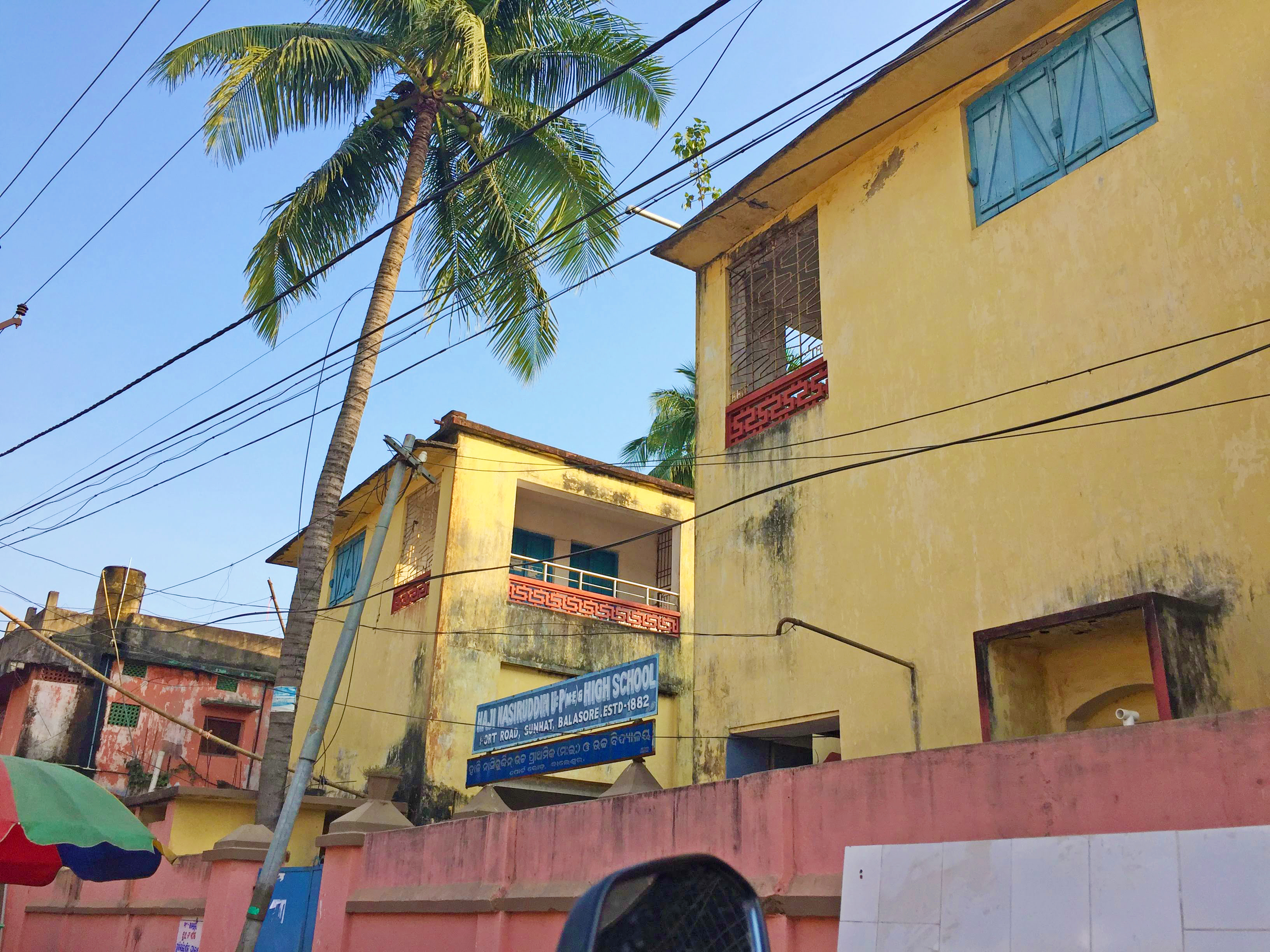
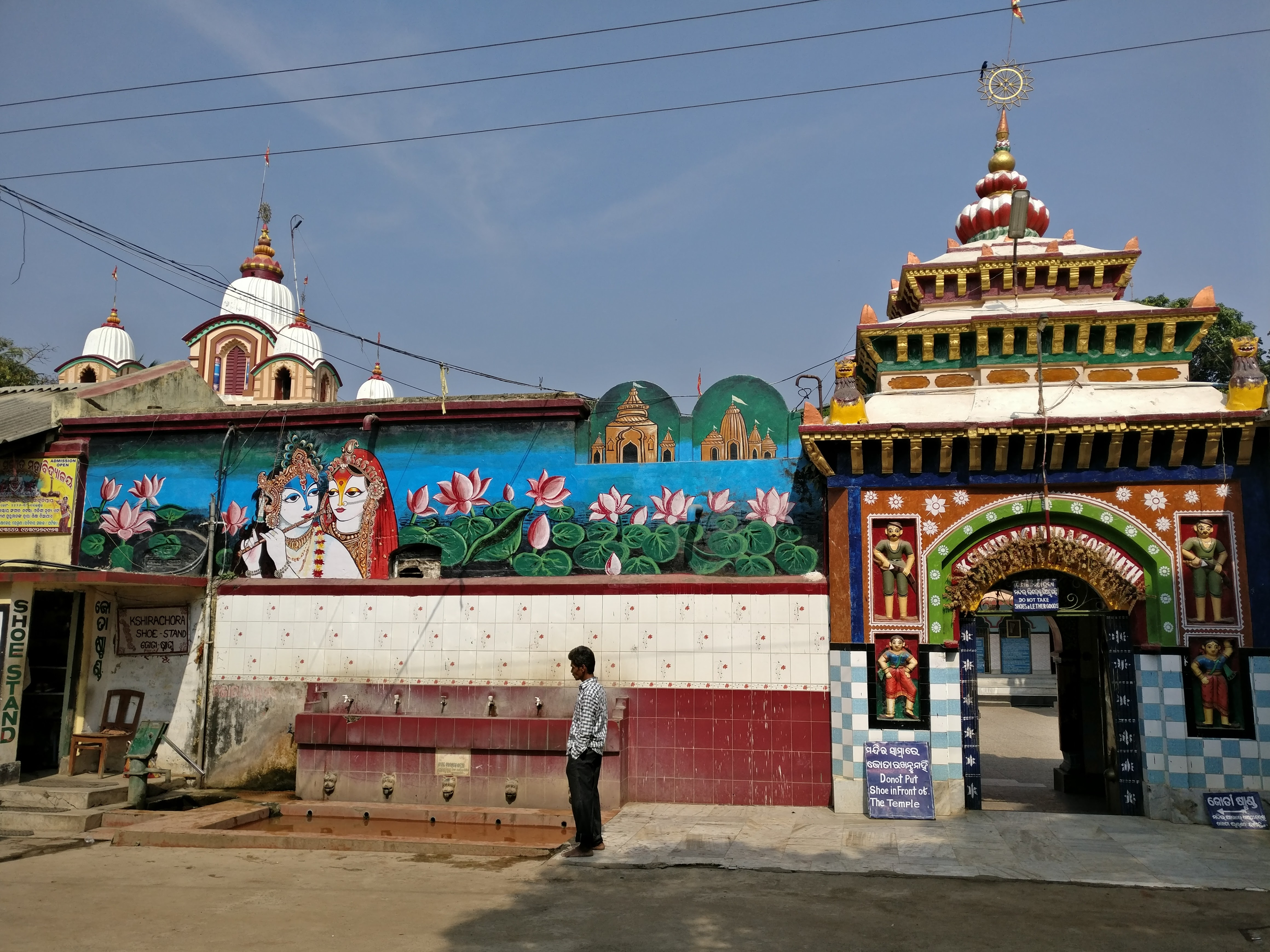
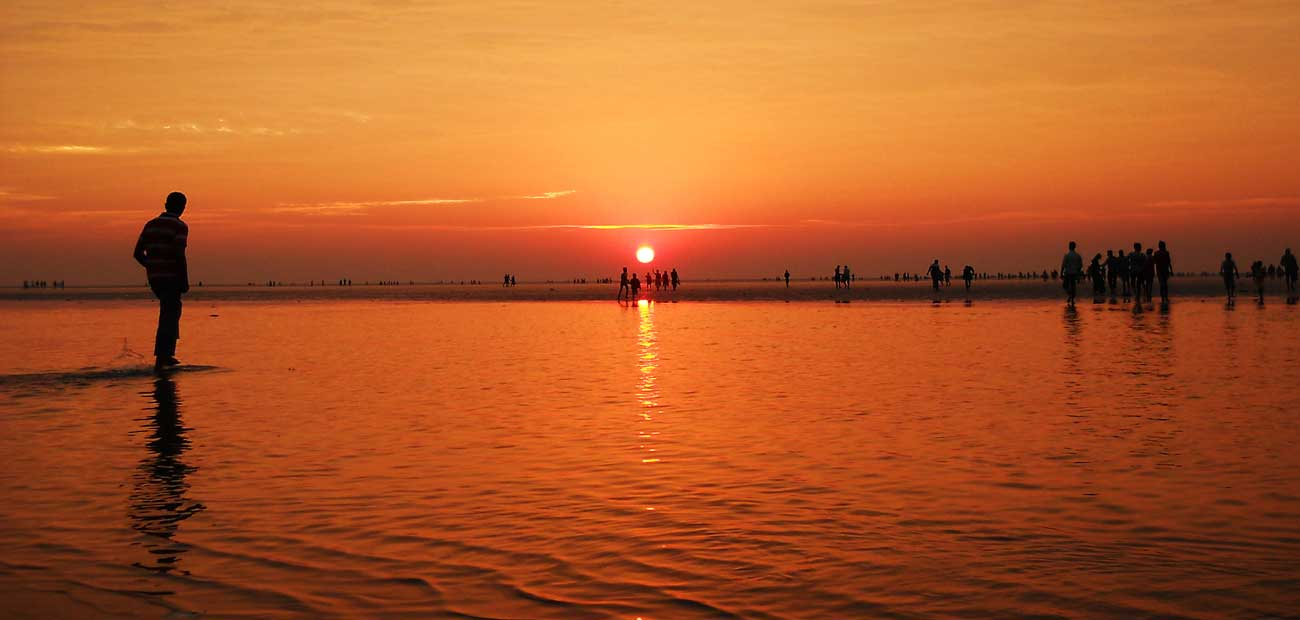
- Clockwise from top-left: Emami Jagannath Temple, Nilagiri Palace, Khirachora Gopinatha Temple in Remuna, Chandipur Beach
- Nickname: Granary of Odisha
- Interactive map of Balasore district
- Coordinates: 21.5°N 86.9°E
- Country: India
- State: Odisha
- Established: 1828
- Headquarter: Balasore

Government
  - Member of Parliament: Pratap Chandra Sarangi (BJP)
  - Collector & District Magistrate: Satya Sarathi Panda
  - Superintendent of Police: Sudhanshu Sekhar Mishra, IPS

Area
  - Total: 3,634 km^{2} (1,403 sq mi)
  - Forest: 441.3 km^{2} (170.4 sq mi)
- Elevation: 90.08 m (295.5 ft)

Population (2011)
  - Total: 2,317,419
  - Rank: 4
  - Density: 637.7/km^{2} (1,652/sq mi)
  - Urban: 253,293 (10.93%)
  - Scheduled Castes: 478,586 (20.65%)
  - Scheduled Tribes: 275,678 (11.9%)

Languages
  - Official: Odia
- Time zone: UTC+5:30 (IST)
- PIN: 756 xxx
- Telephone code: 06782
- Vehicle registration: OD-01
- Coastline: 137 km (85 mi)
- Sex ratio: 957 ♂/♀
- Literacy: 80.66%
- Climate: Aw (Köppen)
- Precipitation: 1,583 mm (62.3 in)
- Avg. summer temperature: 43.1 °C (109.6 °F)
- Avg. winter temperature: 10.6 °C (51.1 °F)
- Website: baleswar.nic.in

Balasore district, officially Baleshwar district, is an administrative district of Odisha state, in eastern India. Baleswar is one of the coastal districts of Odisha and lies on the northernmost part of the state. The district headquarters is Balasore.

On 12 June 2026, the Government of Odisha officially approved the name change from Balasore to Baleswar to reflect native Odia phonetics.

== Etymology ==
Baleswar is said to have got its name through the regional derivation of the word Baneswar, from Hindu deity Baneshwar (Shiva), the presiding deity of the town. The Siva temple, Baneswara Temple is located in Puruna Baleswar (lit. 'Old Baleswar').

== Geography ==
Balasore district is located in the northeast of the state of Odisha and lies between 21° 3' to 21° 59' north latitude and 86° 20' to 87° 29' east longitude. The average altitude of the district is 19.08-metre. The district has a total area of 3634 km^{2}. It is bounded by Purba Medinipur, Paschim Medinipur and Jhargram districts of West Bengal in its north, the Bay of Bengal to its east, Bhadrak district to the south and Mayurbhanj and Keonjhar districts to the west.

The district lies along the Odisha coastal plain. In the southwest there are some small hill ranges. The Subarnarekha is the main river, and it empties into the Bay of Bengal in the district.

== Transport ==
Balasore railway station falls en route on the main line connecting Chennai to Kolkata. NH 16 (erstwhile NH 5) runs through Balasore, and NH 60, which connects Balasore to Kolkata, is a four lane express way.

The nearest airport from Balasore is Kolkata International Airport and Biju Patnaik International Airport, Bhubaneswar.

Balasore runs state Buses of (OSRTC) which provide point to point service from Kolkata to Bhubaneswar (via Balasore).

== Demographics ==
=== Population ===
Historical population
Year	Pop.	±%
1901	679,046	—
1911	669,624	−1.4%
1921	622,836	−7.0%
1931	630,857	+1.3%
1941	660,388	+4.7%
1951	658,742	−0.2%
1961	839,081	+27.4%
1971	1,091,230	+30.1%
1981	1,357,727	+24.4%
1991	1,696,583	+25.0%
2001	2,024,508	+19.3%
2011	2,320,529	+14.6%
Source: Census of India

As per the 2011 Census, Balasore district has a population of 2,320,529, which is comparable to the population of Latvia or the US state of New Mexico. It ranks 195th out of 640 districts in India. The district has a population density of 609 people per square kilometre (1,580 per square mile). Over the decade from 2001 to 2011, Balasore's population grew by 14.47%. The district's sex ratio stands at 957 females for every 1,000 males. The overall literacy rate is 79.79%, with male literacy at 87% and female literacy at 72.28%. Urban areas have a literacy rate of 84.67%, while rural areas have a literacy rate of 79.18%. Urban areas account for 10.92% of the population. Scheduled Castes and Scheduled Tribes make up 20.62% and 11.88% of the population, respectively.

=== Religion ===
Balasore district is predominantly Hindu, comprising about 94.7% of the population with 2,197,709 individuals. Muslims represent the second-largest religious group, making up around 4.1% with 94,254 adherents, while Christians account for a smaller 0.3%, totalling 6,434 residents. Other religious minorities include Sikhs (0.01%, 237 individuals), Jains (0.009%, 201 individuals), and Buddhists (0.005%, 111 individuals). Additionally, about 0.8% (18,345 individuals) belong to other faiths, and 0.1% (3,238 individuals) have not stated their religion.

Religious Demographic in Balasore District (2011)
1. Hinduism (94.7%)
2. Islam (4.06%)
3. Sarnaism (0.79%)
4. Other or not stated (0.44%)

Block	Hindu	Muslim	Other
Raibania	68,536	2,209	9,227
Balaramgadi Marine	2,406	2,812	19
Jaleswar	139,295	6,856	3,019
Bhograi	181,194	7,087	278
Kamarda	91,951	4,090	131
Baliapal	167,167	3,560	231
Singla	124,404	7,426	2,348
Basta	141,675	8,369	630
Rupsa	23,938	1,225	26
Baleswar Sadar	170,040	7,796	1,256
Sahadevkhunta	9,140	1,058	35
Chandipur	39,397	938	253
Bamapada	10,969	232	76
Remuna	86,680	4,182	806
Nilagiri	130,505	351	1,312
Berhampur	54,250	86	3,278
Oupada	39,708	14	37
Khaira	137,436	1,910	431
Soro	301,534	9,607	366
Similia	157,645	3,830	148
Balasore (M)	119,839	21,616	508

=== Languages ===
Languages of Baleswar district (2011)
1. Odia (88.3%)
2. Santali (4.11%)
3. Urdu (3.39%)
4. Bengali (1.30%)
5. Others (2.90%)

At the time of the 2011 Census of India, 88.30% of the population in the district spoke Odia, 4.11% Santali, 3.39% Urdu, 1.30% Bengali and 2.90% Others as their first language.

The local dialect of the region is Baleswari, a dialect of Odia. Other languages include Bhunjia, spoken by approximately 7000 Bhunjia Adivasis and Santali.

== Education ==
The district constitute primary university is F. M. University. There is government medical college in district known as Fakir Mohan Medical College and Hospital. Jawahar Navodaya Vidyalaya, Bagudi (also known as JNV Bagudi or JNV Balasore) is a public residential school in Bagudi village (near Mangalpur) of Soro block in the Balasore district. Government-run, it provides education to children predominantly from the rural areas and economically challenged families. It was established and is managed by Navodaya Vidyalaya Samiti (an autonomous organisation of the Ministry of Human Resource Development and Department of Secondary Education and Higher Education).In accordance with the National Policy on Education (1986) of the government of India, the Jawahar Navodaya Vidyalaya Bagudi in the Balasore district was established during March 1987.

== Politics ==
The district has 1 Lok Sabha constituency (Balasore) and 8 Vidhan Sabha constituencies. The current MP from Balasore is Pratap Chandra Sarangi from the BJP.

The following is the 8 Vidhan sabha constituencies of Balasore district and the elected members of that area:

No.	Constituency	Reservation	Extent of the Assembly Constituency (Blocks)	MLA	Party
35	Jaleswar	None	Jaleswar (M), Jaleswar, Basta (part)	Aswini Kumar Patra	BJD
36	Bhograi	None	Bhogarai	Goutam Buddha Das	BJD
37	Basta	None	Baliapal, Basta (part)	Subasini Jena	BJD
38	Balasore	None	Balasore (M), Balasore (part)	Manas Kumar Dutta	BJP
39	Remuna	SC	Remuna, Balasore (part)	Gobinda Chandra Das	BJP
40	Nilgiri	None	Nilagiri (NAC), Nilagiri, Oupada, Bahanaga (part)	Santosh Khatua	BJP
41	Soro	SC	Soro (M), Soro, Bahanaga (part)	Madhab Dhada	BJD
42	Simulia	None	Simulia, Khaira	Padma Lochan Panda	BJP

== See also ==
- Baba Bhusandeswar Temple
- Rocket launch sites
- Proof and Experimental Establishment, Chandipur
- Abdul Kalam Island
- Bhadrak district
