= List of railway accidents and incidents in India =

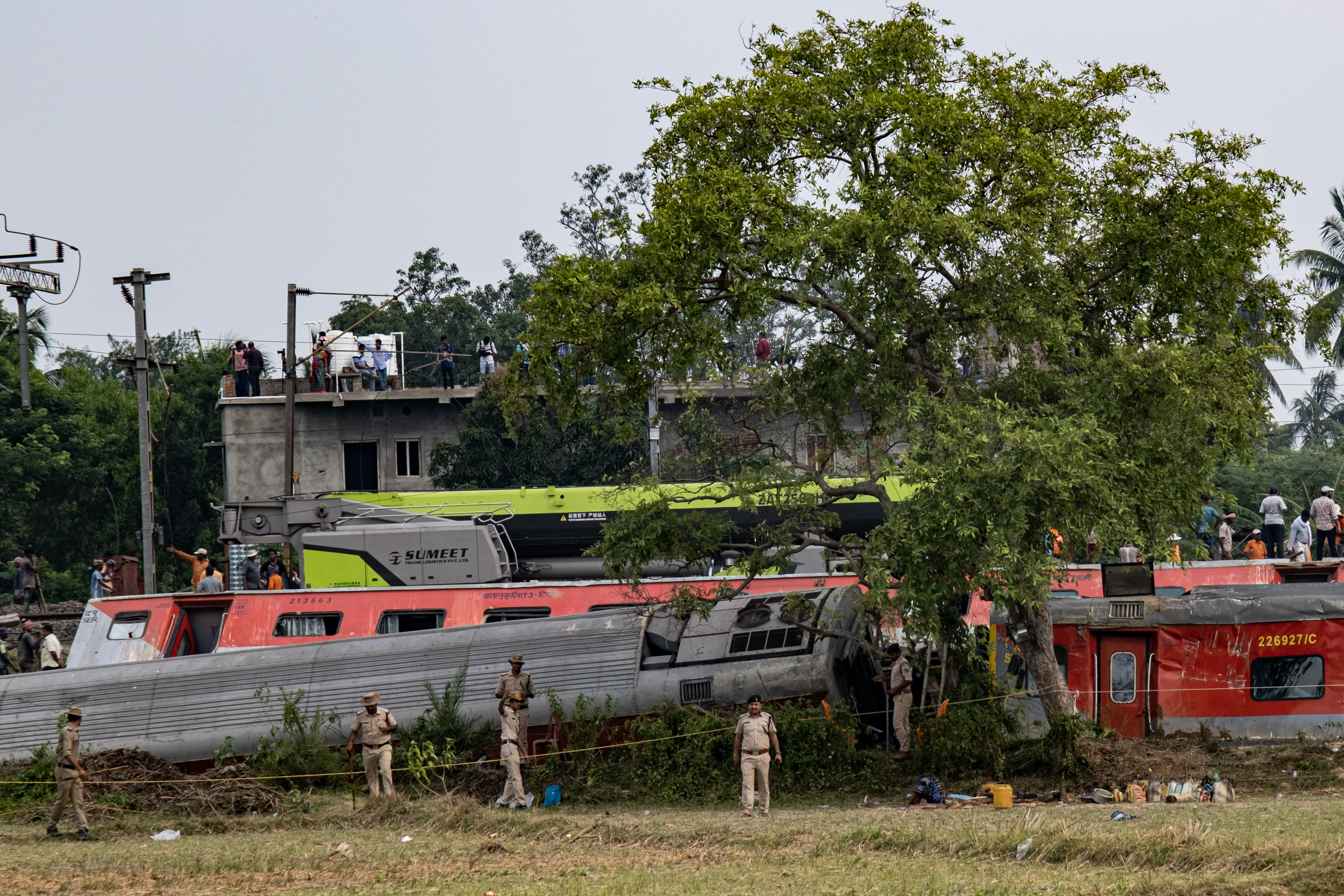
The 2023 Odisha train collision is one of the deadliest rail accidents with 296 casualties.

Indian Railways operates India's railway system and comes under the purview of the Ministry of Railways of the Government of India. As of 2025, it maintains over 148,706 km (92,402 mi) of tracks and operates over 13,000 trains daily.

== Statistics ==
As per the Ministry of Railways, there have been more than 38,500 railway accidents from 1961 to 2019. In 2019–20, the Indian Railways reported zero passenger deaths due to accidents for the first time in its history. At least 313 people died in 40 train crashes in 2023–24 and 748 people have died in 638 train crashes in the previous ten years.

Accidents of Indian Railways
| Span | Accidents | | | | | | Train kms (million) | Accidents per million kms |
| Span | Collisions | Derailments | Level crossing | Fire | Others | Total | Train kms (million) | Accidents per million kms |
|---|---|---|---|---|---|---|---|---|
| 1961–1970 | 834 | 10,664 | 1,394 | 1,037 | 0 | 13,929 | 4,339 | 3.21 |
| 1971–1980 | 588 | 6,763 | 1,120 | 185 | 0 | 8,665 | 4,810 | 1.80 |
| 1981–1990 | 475 | 6,242 | 677 | 176 | 0 | 7,570 | 5,598 | 1.35 |
| 1991–2000 | 340 | 3,583 | 632 | 77 | 0 | 4,642 | 6,559 | 0.70 |
| 2001–2010 | 135 | 1,680 | 803 | 93 | 52 | 2,763 | 8,333 | 0.33 |
| 2011–2019 | 43 | 567 | 352 | 54 | 16 | 1,023 | 10,134 | 0.10 |

== Deadliest rail accidents ==
Deadliest rail accidents in India
| Date | Train(s) | Location | Fatalities | Cause |
|---|---|---|---|---|
| 20 August 1995 | Kalindi Express; Purushottam Express | Firozabad, Uttar Pradesh | 358 | Track obstruction by a nilgai, followed by a rear-end collision. |
| 2 June 2023 | Coromandel Express; Howrah-SMVT Bengaluru Express; A freight train | Near Bahanaga Bazar, Balasore, Odisha | 296 | Collision and derailment due to signalling error |
| 2 August 1999 | Avadh Assam Express; Brahmaputra Mail | Gaisal, West Bengal | 285 | Collision due to signalling error |
| 6 June 1981 | Mansi-Saharsa Passenger | Over Bagmati River near Mansi, Bihar | 235 | Derailment over a bridge, possibly due to a tropical cyclone |
| 26 November 1998 | Frontier Mail; Jammu Tawi-Sealdah Express | Khanna, Punjab | 212 | Derailment and collision due to damaged rail |
| 23 December 1964 | Pamban-Dhanushkodi Passenger | Dhanushkodi, Tamil Nadu | 200+ | Storm surge due to a tropical cyclone |
| 20 November 2016 | Indore–Patna Express | Near Pukhrayan, Kanpur, Uttar Pradesh | 150 | Derailment due to fractured rail |
| 28 May 2010 | Jnaneswari Express; A Goods train | Near Jhargram, West Bengal | 148+ | Possible sabotage by Naxalites |
| 10 September 2002 | Howrah Rajdhani Express | Over Dhave river near Rafiganj, Bihar | 130+ | Sabotage by Naxalites |

This is an incomplete chronological list of railway crashes and incidents in India.

== Before 1950 ==
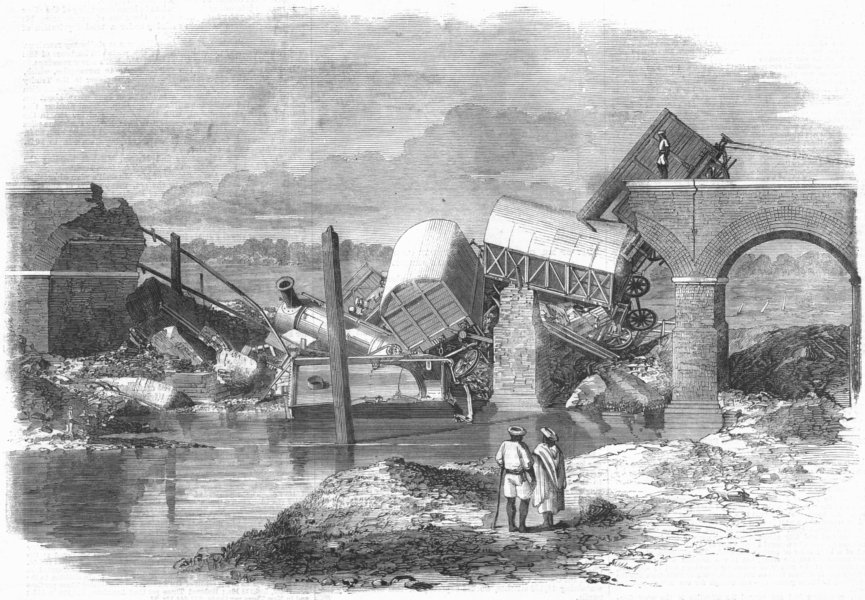
East Indian Railway wreck (1863)

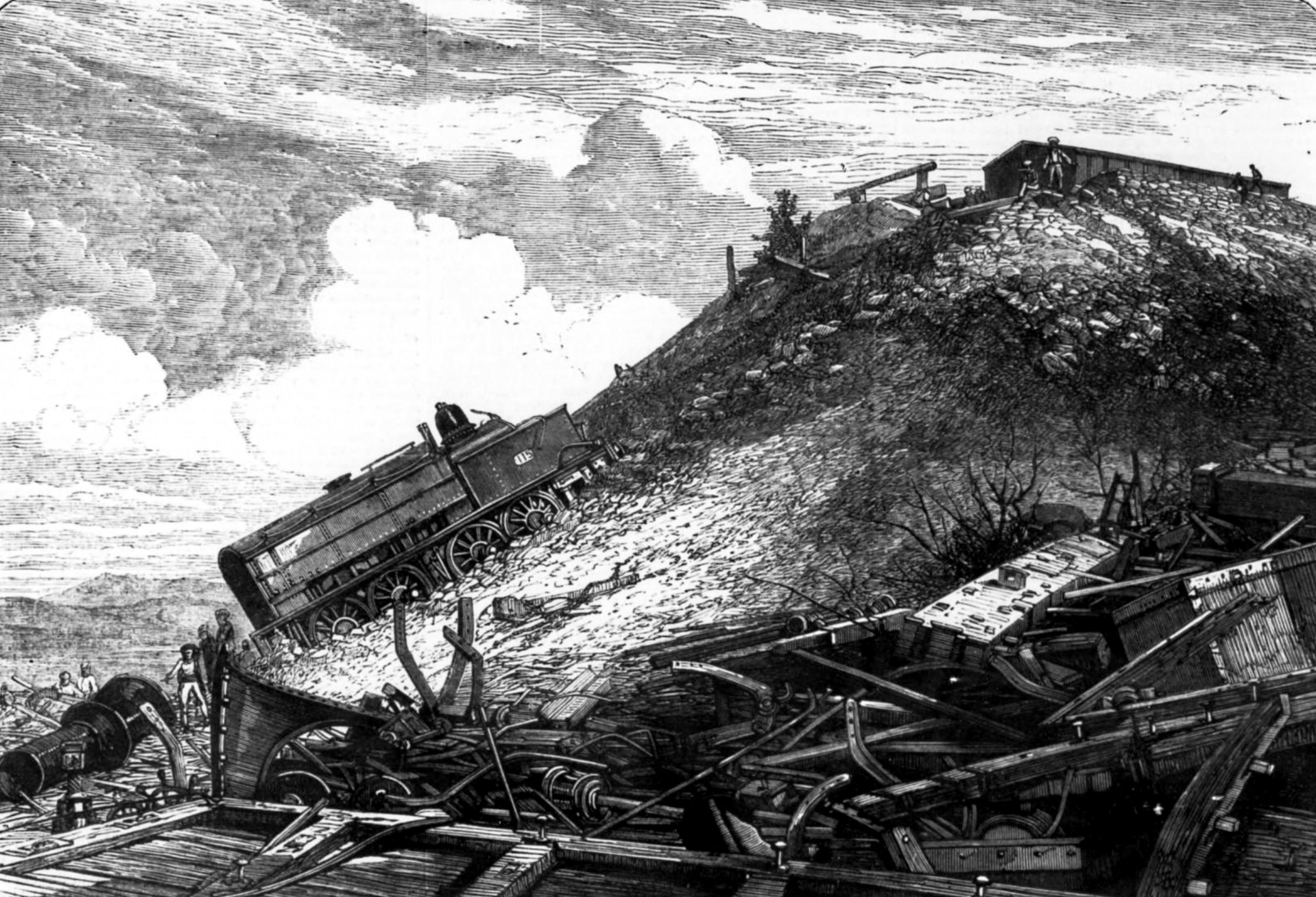
Bhor Ghat rail accident (1869)

- 28 February 1863 – An accident on the East Indian Railway resulted in a bridge collapsing somewhere on the line between Ahmoodpur and Rampur. Train stuff jumped off the train and so no one died during the crash.
- 26 January 1869 – Bhor Ghat rail accident: At least 15 people were killed and 35 were injured after the Bombay-Pune Mail train substained a brake failure on incline track at the Bhor Ghat Pass, Maharashtra and crashed through a dead-end of the Bhor Ghat Reversing Station track down the railway embankment.
- before 26 September 1897 – Maddur railway bridge collapse: Collapse of railway bridge, damaged by a flood, near Maddur caused a derailment of five fully loaded carriages and drowning of about 150 passengers.
- 12 September 1902 – About 100 passengers were killed when the Bombay-Madras Mail derailed on a bridge near Mangapatnam in Kadapa district of Madras Presidency.
- 2 December 1908 – Two passenger trains collided near Barara in Punjab Province, killing 22 and injuring 24.
- 27 April 1920 – At least 120 people were killed and 50 were injured after the Doon Express collided with a freight train near Moradabad in United Provinces.
- 7 October 1920 – At least 40 people were killed when the Madras-Bangalore mail train derailed near Arakkonam in Madras Presidency.
- 17 July 1937 – At least 119 people were killed and more than 180 were injured after the Upper India Express plunged down an embankment near Bihta.
- 28 June 1939 – At least 10 people were killed and 21 injured in a train crash near Bombay.
- 4 October 1942 – At least 12 people were killed and 40 were injured when the Frontier Mail derailed near Bombay.

== 1950s ==
- 12 April 1950 – At least 50 people were killed and 73 were injured when the Kumaon Express derailed and crashed into a river.
- 7 May 1950 – At least 100 people were killed when a passenger train plunged off a bridge in Bihar.
- 3 September 1951 – At least 10 people were killed and 30 were injured when the Saharanpur Express derailed about 18 km (11 mi) from Delhi.
- 4 January 1954 – A passenger train derailed while crossing a bridge near Bhatinda in Punjab, killing at least 15 people and injuring 40.
- 31 March 1954 – Explosives being transported on a passenger train detonated near Gorakhpur in Uttar Pradesh, killing 31 and injuring 32.
- 15 September 1954 – A train crashed into a truck carrying students at an unstaffed level crossing 130 km (80 mi) north of New Delhi, killing 10 and injuring 18.
- 27 September 1954 – At least 136 people were killed in a derailment at a girder bridge near Jangaon in Hyderabad State.
- 28 September 1954 – At least 139 were killed and more than 100 were injured when a passenger train crashed into the Yasanti river after a bridge collapsed, about 75 km (47 mi) south of Hyderabad.
- 2 September 1956 – 1956 Mahbubnagar train accident: At least 125 were killed and 22 injured when a bridge collapsed under a train travelling between Jadcherla and Mahbubnagar in Andhra Pradesh.
- 23 November 1956 – 1956 Ariyalur train accident: At least 104 people were killed and 100 injured when the Madras-Tuticorin Express plunged into a river from an embankment weakened by flooding, about 282 km (175 mi) south of Madras.
- 2 June 1957 – A passenger train crashed into a stationary train in Bombay, killing 18 and injuring 53.
- 23 July 1957 – A passenger train collided with the Hazaribagh-Howrah Express near Tatanagar in Bihar.
- 19 August 1957 – Four persons were killed and nine were injured when the Janata Express derailed between Palasa and Pundi stations in Andhra Pradesh.
- 21 August 1957 – Five persons were killed when a wagon loaded with fire crackers exploded at Katpadi in Madras State.
- 8 November 1957 – Two trains collided near Jawapur in Uttar Pradesh.
- 23 November 1957 – Nine people were killed and 54 injured after four coaches of the Bombay–Calcutta Mail capsized upon derailment near Padali in Maharashtra.
- 20 October 1959 – A head-on collision took place between a freight and a passenger train at Badanpur in Uttar Pradesh.

== 1960s ==
- 8 March 1961 – A passenger train and freight train collided near Kalihar in Bihar, killing 11 and injuring 37.
- 20 October 1961 – The Ranchi Express derailed 200 km (120 mi) from Calcutta, killing 47 and injuring many others.
- 22 July 1962 – The Punjab Mail crashed into a freight train at Dumraon in Bihar, resulting in over 100 fatalities.
- 22 July 1963 – More than 100 passengers were killed when Udyan Abha Toofan Express derailed at Etmadpur near Tundla in Uttar Pradesh.
- 23 December 1964 – The Pamban-Dhanuskodi passenger train was washed away during the Rameswaram cyclone, killing over 126 passengers on board.
- 19 June 1965 – A freight train collided with a train carrying railway workers about 800 km (500 mi) from Bombay, killing 15.
- 16 February 1966 – At least 27 people were killed when an express train was bombed by Naga separatists in Assam.
- 20 April 1966 – A train was bombed by Naga separatists at the Lumding railway station in Assam, killing 55 and wounding 127.
- 23 April 1966 – A train was bombed by Naga separatists at the Diphu railway station in Assam, killing 40 and wounding 60.
- 13 June 1966 – Two passenger trains collided near Matunga in Bombay, killing at least 57 people and injuring 100.
- 19 March 1968 – The Deccan Express collided with the Birur–Hubli passenger train at Yalvigi in Karnataka, killing 53 and injuring 42.
- 4 February 1969 – Passengers riding on the top of a train were swept off by the girders of a bridge near Madras, killing 32 people and injuring 50.
- 21 June 1969 – Six passenger cars of an express train derailed and fell into the Magari River, killing 70 and injuring 130 in Muhammadabad in Uttar Pradesh.
- 14 July 1969 – A freight train crashed into a stationary passenger train near Jaipur in Rajasthan, killing 85 and injuring 130.

== 1970s ==
- 26 April 1972 – A passenger train derailed in Mysore state, killing 21 and injuring 37.
- 21 February 1974 – A passenger train crashed into a freight train at Moradabad in Uttar Pradesh, killing 41 and injuring 63.
- 30 May 1977 – At least 45 people were killed and 100 were injured when a bridge across the Beki river near Guwahati collapsed under the Tezpur Express.
- 23 November 1977 – At least 20 were killed and 21 were injured when a passenger train derailed near Rewari in Haryana.
- 18 April 1978 – At least 30 people were killed and 60 were injured when an express train crashed into the rear of a passenger train at Bassain Road railway station in Bombay.
- 14 November 1979 – Five people were killed and more than 50 were injured when two passenger trains collided near Matunga in Bombay.
- 23 December 1979 – An express train crashed into the rear of a standing passenger train near Sarupeta in Assam, killing 18 and injuring 25.

== 1980s ==
- 12 February 1981 – At least 19 people were killed and more than 50 were injured when a freight train, the Trivandrum Mail, and the Yercaud Express collided near Vaniyambadi in Tamil Nadu.
- 6 June 1981 – Bihar train derailment: At least 235 people were killed and several were injured when a passenger train fell into the Bagmati River after derailing while crossing a bridge.
- 16 July 1981 – At least 50 people were killed and 49 were injured when a freight train collided on to the back of the Narmada Express between Khdori and Bhanwar Tonk stations in Madhya Pradesh.
- 19 July 1981 – At least 30 people were killed and 70 were injured after a passenger train from New Delhi to Ahmedabad derailed in Gujarat due to track sabotage.
- 28 January 1982 – At least 61 people were killed and 23 were injured when the Dakshin Express collided with a freight train in heavy fog near Agra Cantonment in Uttar Pradesh.
- 20 March 1982 – At least 59 people were killed and 25 were injured after an express train from Mangalore Central to New Delhi collided with a tourist bus at an unstaffed level crossing in Andhra Pradesh.
- 10 February 1984 – At least 43 people were killed and more than 58 were injured after a shuttle train collided onto the rear of the Punjab Mail in Bahadurgarh in Haryana.
- 15 September 1984 – At least 112 people were killed and several others injured when four bogies of the Jabalpur–Gondia passenger train fell into a river after a portion of a bridge had been washed away due to heavy flash floods near Charegaon in Balaghat district of Madhya Pradesh.
- 22 November 1984 – At least 25 people were killed and more than 100 injured when a Mumbai local train derailed near Byculla railway station.
- 23 February 1985 – Fifty people were killed when two coaches of an express train caught fire near Rajnandgaon in Madhya Pradesh.
- 13 June 1985 – At least 38 people were killed in a collision between an express and a freight train near Agra in Uttar Pradesh.
- 22 November 1985 – One person was killed and more than 300 were injured after the Tinsukia Mail collided with a freight train near Dhupguri in West Bengal.
- 10 March 1986 – At least 50 people were killed and 200 were injured as two passenger trains collided near Khagaria in Bihar.
- 6 August 1986 – At least 52 people were killed and 35 were injured as two coaches of an express train fell into a stream after colliding with a stationary freight train in Palamau district of Bihar.
- 8 July 1987 – At least 53 people were killed when the Dakshin Express derailed near Mancherial in Andhra Pradesh.
- 15 March 1987 – At least 25 people were killed after a bomb caused several coaches of the Rockfort Express to derail and plunge into a dry riverbed near Ariyalur in Tamil Nadu.
- 14 May 1989 – At least 75 people were killed when the Karnataka Express derailed near Lalitpur in Uttar Pradesh.
- 8 July 1988 – Peruman railway accident: At least 105 people were killed and more than 200 were injured when the Island Express derailed on the Peruman bridge and fell into Ashtamudi Lake in Kerala.
- 1 November 1989 – At least 48 people were killed when the Udyan Abha Toofan Express derailed in Sakaldiha in Uttar Pradesh.
- 16 April 1990 – At least 70 people were burnt alive as a shuttle train caught fire near Patna in Bihar.
- 6 June 1990 – Thirty-six people were killed in a collision between two trains at Gollagudem in Andhra Pradesh.
- 25 June 1990 – At least 60 people were killed when a freight train collided with a passenger train near Daltonganj in Bihar.
- 10 October 1990 – Forty people were killed in a fire in a passenger train near Cherlapally in Andhra Pradesh.

== 1990s ==
- 16 April 1990 – At least 70 people were killed after a shuttle train caught fire near Patna in Bihar.
- 6 June 1990 – At least 36 people were killed after a fire on a passenger train near Gollagudem in Andhra Pradesh.
- 25 June 1990 – Nearly 60 people were killed after a freight train collided with a passenger train near Mangra in Bihar.
- 10 October 1990 – A train fire near Cherlapally in Andhra Pradesh resulted in 40 deaths.
- 6 March 1991 – At least 30 people were killed when the Karnataka Express derailed in heavy rain near Makalidurga, about 60 km (37 mi) from Bangalore in Karnataka.
- 12 December 1991 – At least 27 people were killed after the Kangra Valley Railway derailed near Jawali, Himachal Pradesh.
- 5 September 1992 – A collision between two trains near Raigarh in Madhya Pradesh killed 41 people.
- 16 January 1993 – The Howrah Rajdhani Express collided with a freight train near Ambiyapur in Uttar Pradesh.
- 16 July 1993 – A train accident in the Darbhanga district of Bihar killed 60 people.
- 21 September 1993 – At least 71 people were killed after a passenger train collided with a freight train near Chhabra in Rajasthan.
- 3 May 1994 – At least 35 people were killed when the Narayanadri Express collided with a tractor in Nalgonda district of Andhra Pradesh.
- 26 October 1994 – At least 27 people were killed when a sleeper coach of the Howrah Mumbai Mail caught fire.
- 14 May 1995 – At least 52 people were killed after the Chennai Egmore–Kanniyakumari Express collided head-on with a freight train near Salem.
- 1 June 1995 – At least 45 people were killed and more than 335 injured after the Kolkata–Jammu Tawi Express collided with a stationary coal-laden freight train. On the same day, 15 people were killed after four carriages of the Hirakud Express derailed and fell down an embankment near Barpali in Orissa.
- 20 August 1995 – Firozabad rail disaster: At least 358 people were killed when the Purushottam Express collided with the rear of the stationary Kalindi Express near Firozabad in Uttar Pradesh.
- 18 April 1996 – Sixty people were killed after a passenger train collided with a stationary freight train near Domingarh in Uttar Pradesh's Gorakhpur district.
- 14 May 1996 – A passenger train collided with a bus at an unstaffed level-crossing near Alappuzha in Kerala, killing 35 people from a marriage party.
- 25 May 1996 – At least 25 people were killed after a passenger train bound for Allahabad collided with a tractor-trolley at an unstaffed level-crossing near Varanasi in Uttar Pradesh.
- 30 December 1996 – Brahmaputra Mail train bombing: More than 33 people were killed when a bomb blast destroyed three carriages and derailed six more carriages of the Brahmaputra Mail between Kokrajhar and Fakiragram in Assam.
- 8 July 1997 – A bomb blast aboard a passenger train killed 33 people at Khanna in Punjab's Bhatinda district.
- 28 July 1997 – The Karnataka Express collided with the Himsagar Express on the outskirts of Delhi resulting in 12 deaths.
- 15 August 1997 – At least 75 people were killed when the up and down trains of the Coromandel Express collided near Visakhapatnam in Andhra Pradesh.
- 14 September 1997 – More than 81 people were killed after five cars of the Ahmedabad–Howrah Express plunged into a river in Bilaspur district of Madhya Pradesh.
- 6 December 1997 – Ten people were killed and more than 64 were injured after serial bomb blasts in Cheran Express at Erode, Pandian Express at Tiruchirappalli in Tamil Nadu and Chennai-Alleppey Express at Thrissur in Kerala.
- 6 Jan 1998 – At least 70 people were killed after a passenger train collided with the stationary Kashi Vishwanath Express about 12 km (7.5 mi) from Hardoi in Uttar Pradesh.
- 4 April 1998 – Fatuha train crash: At least 11 passengers were killed and 50 were injured after the Howrah–Danapur Express derailed near Bihar's Fatuha due to sabotage.
- 24 April 1998 – At least 24 people were killed and more than 32 injured after 15 cars of a freight train collided with the Manmad–Kachiguda Express at Parli Vaijnath railway station in Maharashtra.
- 13 August 1998 – At least 19 people were killed and 27 were injured after the Madurai–Chennai Egmore Express collided with a bus at an unstaffed level-crossing near Karur in Tamil Nadu.
- 24 September 1998 – About 20 people were killed and 33 were injured after a locomotive collided with a bus at an unstaffed level-crossing near Bothalapalem in Andhra Pradesh.
- 26 November 1998 – Khanna rail disaster: More than 212 people were killed after occurred when the Sealdah–Jammu Tawi Express collided with three derailed coaches of the Golden Temple Mail at Khanna in Punjab.
- 4 June 1999 – Twelve people were killed and 60 were injured when 14 bogies of the Hyderabad–Visakhapatnam Godavari Express derailed near Kazipet in Andhra Pradesh.
- 16 July 1999 – At least 17 people were killed and more than 200 were injured after the Grand Trunk Express collided with derailed cars of a freight train between Agra and Mathura in Uttar Pradesh.
- 2 August 1999 – Gaisal train disaster: At least 285 people were killed and more than 300 were injured when the Brahmaputra Mail collided with the Avadh Assam Express at Gaisal in Assam.
- 15 August 1999 – Nearly 50 passengers were killed and more than 500 were injured when the Coromandel Express derailed near Dusi in Andhra Pradesh's Srikakulam district.
- 6 December 1999 – At least 20 passengers were killed and more than 100 were injured after the Coromandel Express derailed near Jenapur in Orissa after tracks were damaged due to a cyclone.

== 2000s ==
- 6 June 2000 – The driver of a passenger train was killed and nearly 24 were injured when the train deraied near Kasganj in Etah district of Uttar Pradesh.
- 1 July 2000 – Two engine drivers of the Howrah-Amritsar Express were killed after it collided with an empty rake of a passenger train in Ambala in Punjab.
- 2 December 2000 – At least 40 people were killed and more than 150 were injured after the Amritsar Mail collided with derailed coaches of a freight train between Ambala and Ludhiana in Punjab.
- 22 June 2001 – Kadalundi train derailment: At least 52 people were killed and more than 300 were injured after four coaches of the Mangalore-Chennai Mail derailed while crossing a bridge and fell into the Kadalundi River in Kerala.
- 16 August 2001 – Fifteen people including eight women and two children were run over by a train while crossing a track in Maharashtra's Jalgaon district.
- 23 August 2001 – At least 11 people were killed after the Ravi Express collided with a mini-van at an unstaffed level crossing.
- 27 February 2002 – Godhra train burning: At least 59 people were killed and more than 43 were wounded when four coaches of the Sabarmati Express were set on fire by a mob at Godhra in Gujarat.
- 13 May 2002 – 2002 Jaunpur train crash: At least 12 people were killed and more than 80 were injured after the Shramjeevi Express derailed due to track sabotage near Jaunpur in Uttar Pradesh.
- 4 June 2002 – Kasganj level crossing disaster: At least 30 people were killed and 29 were injured when the Kanpur Central–Kasganj Express collided with a bus in an unstaffed level crossing near Kasganj in Uttar Pradesh.
- 9 September 2002 – Rafiganj train wreck: More than 140 people were killed when the Howrah Rajdhani Express derailed on a bridge over the Dhave River due to suspected sabotage by the Naxalites between Gaya and Dehri-on-Sone stations in Bihar.
- 5 January 2003 – Ghatnandur train crash: At least 21 people were killed and 41 injured when an express train from Secunderabad to Manmad collided with a stationary freight train at Ghatnandur railway station near Ambajogai in Maharashtra.
- 23 March 2003 – Seven people were injured when 13 cars of the Lokmanya Tilak Terminus–Patliputra Express derailed near Narsinghpur in Madhya Pradesh.
- 15 May 2003 – The Golden Temple Mail caught on fire in the early morning between Ludhiana and Ladhowal in Punjab, resulting in 36 deaths and 15 injuries.
- 22 June 2003 – At least 52 people were killed and 26 were injured after three coaches of a special train between Karwar and Mumbai Central derailed near in Sindhudurg district in Maharashtra.
- 2 July 2003 – At least 21 people were killed and 24 were injured after he locomotive and two coaches of the Golconda Express fell of a bridge near Warangal in Andhra Pradesh.
- 27 February 2004 – At least 30 people were killed when the Sealdah-New Jalpaiguri Kanchenjunga Express collided with a truck at 17:45 IST at an unstaffed railway crossing in Kanki in West Bengal's North Dinajpur district.
- 16 June 2004 – Fourteen people were killed when the Matsyagandha Express derailed after it struck a boulder near a bridge in Maharashtra's Ambawadi.
- 14 December 2004 – At least 37 people were killed and more than 50 injured when signalling issues caused the Ahmedabad–Jammu Tawi Express collided with a local passenger train near Hoshiarpur in Punjab.
- 28 July 2005 – 2005 Jaunpur train bombing: A bomb blast on the Shramjeevi Express killed 13 people and injured more than 50 near Jaunpur in Uttar Pradesh.
- 3 October 2005 – Datia rail accident: At least 16 people were killed and more than 60 were injured after the Bundelkhand Express overshot a sharp turn and derailed near Datia in Madhya Pradesh.
- 25 October 2005 – Three coaches of the Island Express derailed near Kamasamudram in Karnataka with no major injuries reported.
- 29 October 2005 – Valigonda train wreck: At least 114 people were killed and more than 200 were injured when the Delta Fast Passenger train derailed after a rail bridge had been swept away by flash floods near Valigonda in Andhra Pradesh.
- 11 July 2006 – 2006 Mumbai train bombings: More than 209 people were killed and more than 700 were injured after a series of coordinated bomb attacks by terrorists on commuter trains in Mumbai.
- 20 November 2006 – 2006 West Bengal train explosion: Seven people were killed and 53 were injured after a bomb exploded on a passenger train near Belacoba in West Bengal.
- 1 December 2006 – At least 35 people were killed and more than 17 injured after an old bridge being demolished fell on the passing Howrah–Jamalpur Express in Bihar.
- 18 February 2007 – 2007 Samjhauta Express bombings: At least 68 people were killed after the Samjhauta Express was bombed by terrorists near Diwana in Haryana's Panipat district.
- 7 August 2007 – At least 32 passengers were injured when the Howrah–Jodhpur Express derailed near Kanpur in Uttar Pradesh.
- 1 August 2008 – Nearly 40 people were killed after the Gowthami Express caught fire while crossing Kesamudram railway station in Andhra Pradesh.
- 13 February 2009 – At least 15 people were killed after several carriages of the Coromandel Express caught fire near Jajpur railway station in Orissa.
- 29 April 2009 – Four people were killed after a hijacked local EMU train was crashed onto an empty oil tanker of a freight train at Vyasarpadi Jeeva railway station in Chennai.
- 20 October 2009 – Mathura train collision: At least 21 people were killed and several others were injured when the Goa Express collided with the rear carriage of the stationary Mewar Express outside Mathura in Uttar Pradesh due to a faulty signal.

== 2010s ==
=== 2010 ===
- 2 January – 2010 Uttar Pradesh train accidents: Three accidents took place on the same day in Uttar Pradesh due to dense fog.
  - Ten people were killed and 51 were injured after the Gorakhdham Express collided with the Prayagraj Express near Panki in Kanpur.
  - The Lichchavi Express collided with the stationary Magadh Express near Etawah.
  - The Saryu Express hit a tractor trolley at an unstaffed railway crossing in Pratapgarh and there were no injuries.
- 3 January – Seven coaches of the Arunachal Express derailed near Helem in Assam and no injuries were reported.
- 16 January – Three people were killed and 14 were injured after the Kalindi Express collided with the Shram Shakti Express near Tundla in Uttar Pradesh's Firozabad district.
- 22 January – Three bogies of a freight train derailed near Sathiyaon railway station in Uttar Pradesh's Azamgarh district.
- 25 May – Eleven passengers were injured after the Guwahati Rajdhani Express train derailed in Naugachia, Bihar as the driver applied emergency brakes post hearing a loud explosion.
- 28 May – Jnaneswari Express train derailment: More than 148 people were killed when the Jnaneswari Express derailed and was struck by an oncoming freight train between Khemashuli and Sardiha stations in West Bengal's West Midnapore district at around 1:00 IST. The cause of the accident was suspected to be sabotage by Naxalites.
- 4 June – Five people were killed after an express train collided with a mini-bus at an unstaffed level-crossing at Idigarai near Coimbatore in Tamil Nadu.
- 18 June – More than 27 people were injured after the Amaravati Express derailed after colliding with a road-roller at an unstaffed level crossing near Koppal in Karnataka.
- 19 July – Sainthia train collision: At least 66 people were killed and 150 were injured after the Uttar Banga Express collided with the Vananchal Express near the Sainthia railway station in West Bengal's Birbhum district.
- 8 August – Four people including two foreigners were killed when the Alappuzha–Chennai Express collided with a car in an unstaffed railway crossing near Mararikulam in Kerala's Alappuzha district.
- 17 August – Four people were killed in a crash at the Goryamau railway station in Uttar Pradesh's Barabanki district.

=== 2011 ===
- 1 January – One person was killed and two were injured after the Akal Takht Express collided with two trucks at a railway crossing near Babura in Uttar Pradesh's Jaunpur district.
- 7 July – At least 38 people were killed and 30 were injured after the Chhapra–Mathura Superfast Express hit a bus at an unstaffed level crossing near Thanagaon in Uttar Pradesh's Kanshiram Nagar district.
- 10 July – Fatehpur derailment: At least 70 passengers were killed and more than 300 were injured after the Kalka Mail derailed in Fatehpur district of Uttar Pradesh.
- 10 July – More than 100 people were injured after four coaches of the Guwahati – Puri Express derailed and rolled over into a rivulet in Assam's Nalbari district. The derailment was determined to have been the result of sabotage by a bomb planted by the local militants.
- 23 July – Eight cars of a freight train derailed in Utttar Pradesh's Allahabad district.
- 31 July – Three people were killed and at least 200 were injured after the Kaziranga Express derailed and was hit by another train in Malda district, West Bengal.
- 13 September – At least ten people were killed and several others were injured after a suburban MEMU commuter train collided with a stationary passenger train between Melpakkam and Chitheri stations in Vellore district of Tamil Nadu.
- 22 November – Seven people were killed after the Doon Express caught fire in Jharkhand.
- 23 November – At least 20 people were injured after a passenger train between Qazigund and Baramulla derailed near Sadura in Anantnag district of Jammu and Kashmir.

=== 2012 ===
- 11 January – Five people were killed and nine were injured after the Brahmaputra Mail collided with a stationary freight train in Jharkhand.
- 26 February – Three people were killed after the Kozhikode–Thiruvananthapuram Jan Shatabdi Express struck them after they veered off into the track while watching fireworks.
- 20 March – At least 15 people were killed after a train collided with a taxi minivan at an unstaffed railway crossing in northern Uttar Pradesh.
- 26 March – Two people were killed after a MEMU commuter train collided with a boulder-carrying truck at a level crossing on the outskirts of Bengaluru.
- 22 May – At least 25 people were killed and more than 43 were injured after the Hampi Express collided with a freight train near Penukonda in Andhra Pradesh.
- 31 May – Five people were killed and 15 were injured after the Doon Express derailed near Jaunpur in Uttar Pradesh.
- 19 July – Three people were killed and 31 were injured after the Vidarbha Superfast Express collided with a local train near Khardi railway station in Mumbai.
- 30 July – At least 47 people were killed and more than 25 were injured after the Tamil Nadu Express caught fire near Nellore in Andhra Pradesh.
- 30 Nov – One person was killed and several were injured after two coaches of the Grand Trunk Express caught fire near Gwalior in Madhya Pradesh.
- 26 December – At least 71 people were injured after a collision between two passenger trains near Dibrugarh in Assam.

=== 2013 ===
- 10 April – One person was killed after the Muzaffarpur–Yesvantpur Weekly Express derailed near Arakkonam in Tamil Nadu.
- 19 August – Dhamara Ghat train accident: At least 35 people were killed after the Rajya Rani Express ran over passengers disembarking from another train at Dhamara railway station in Bihar.
- 2 November – At least ten people were killed and at least 20 were injured after the Dhanbad–Alappuzha Express ran over passengers of the Vijayawada-Rayagada Passenger train who had jumped onto the adjacent track due to a rumour that their train was on fire.
- 13 November – 2013 Chapramari Forest train accident: Seven Indian elephants were killed and more than ten were injured after an over-speeding Kavi Guru Express passenger train struck a herd of 40 elephants in the Chapramari Wildlife Sanctuary in West Bengal.
- 15 November – Three people were killed and many were injured after the Mangala Lakshadweep Express derailed near Ghoti in Maharashtra's Nashik district.
- 28 December 2013 – At least 26 people were killed and 12 were injured after the KSR Bengaluru–Hazur Sahib Nanded Express caught fire near Kothacheruvu in Andhra Pradesh's Anantapur district.

=== 2014 ===
- 20 March – One person was killed and nine were injured after six coaches of a local train uncoupled and derailed at Titwala in Mumbai.
- 1 May – 2014 Chennai train bombing: One person was killed and 14 were injured when two low-intensity bombs exploded on the Kaziranga Express at Chennai Central.
- 4 May – At least 20 people were killed and more than 145 were injured after the Diva-Sawantvadi passenger train derailed between Nagothane and Roha stations in Maharashtra.
- 26 May – At least 25 passengers were killed and more than 50 were injured after the Gorakhdham Express collided with a stationary freight train near Khalilabad in Uttar Pradesh.
- 25 June – Four people were killed and eight were injured after the Dibrugarh Rajdhani Express derailed near Chapra in Bihar.
- 23 July – Medak district bus-train collision: At least 20 people were killed after a passenger train collided with a school bus at an unstaffed level-crossing in Masaipet of Andhra Pradesh's Medak district.

=== 2015 ===
- 13 February – Anekal derailment: At least 12 people were killed and more than 100 were injured after nine coaches of the Bangalore City–Ernakulam Intercity Express derailed near Anekal in Bangalore.
- 20 March – 2015 Uttar Pradesh train accident: At least 58 people were killed and more than 150 were injured when the Dehradun–Varanasi Janta Express derailed near Rae Bareli in Uttar Pradesh.
- 25 May – Five people were killed and more than 50 were injured after the Muri Express derailed in Uttar Pradesh.
- 4 August – Harda twin train derailment: At least 31 people were killed and more than 100 were injured after the Kamayani Express and the Janata Express trains derailed between Kurawan and Bhiringi stations in Madhya Pradesh. Flash floods caused by Cyclonic Storm Komen dislodged a culvert causing a track misalignment, and several carriages of the Kamayani Express fell into the Machak river.
- 4 September – Five coaches of the Chennai Egmore – Mangalore Central Express derailed near Puvanur railway station in Tamil Nadu resulting in 39 injuries.
- 12 September – Two people were killed and seven were injured after nine coaches of the Lokmanya Tilak Terminus–Secunderabad AC Duronto Express derailed near Martur railway station in Gulbarga district of Karnataka.
- 12 September – Two British citizens were killed and 13 were injured after three coaches of a chartered Shivalik Queen train on the Kalka–Shimla Railway derailed near Taksal in Himachal Pradesh.

=== 2016 ===
- 5 February – About 40 people were injured after four coaches of the Island Express derailed near Patchur railway station in Tamil Nadu's Vellore district.
- 6 May – Seven people were injured after the Thiruvananthapuram–Chennai Mail collided with a suburban train near Pattabiram railway station in Chennai.
- 27 August – Twelve coaches of the Thiruvananthapuram-Mangalore Express derailed near Karukutty railway station in Kerala and no casualties reported.
- 29 September – One person was killed and 22 were injured after a passenger train collied with a freight train near Cuttack in Odisha.
- 20 November – Pukhrayan train derailment: At least 152 people were killed and more than 260 were injured when 14 coaches of the Indore–Patna Express derailed near Pukhrayan in Uttar Pradesh's Kanpur Nagar district.
- 6 December – Two people were killed and six were injured after Guwahati–Rajendra Nagar Capital Express derailed near Samuktala Road station in Alipurduar district, West Bengal.
- 28 December – At least 44 people were injured after 15 coaches of the Ajmer-Sealdah Express derailed while crossing a bridge near Rura station in Uttar Pradesh. Five coaches of a local train derailed in Mumbai and no injuries were reported.

=== 2017 ===
- 11 January – At least five persons including the train driver were injured as the locomotive and two coaches of the Darjeeling Himalayan Railway passenger derailed between Kurseong and Mahanadi railway stations in Darjeeling district of West Bengal.
- 21 January – Kuneru train derailment: At least 41 people were killed and 69 were injured when the Hirakhand Express derailed near Kuneru in Andhra Pradesh's Vizianagaram district.
- 7 March – 2017 Bhopal–Ujjain Passenger train bombing: Ten people were injured when a bomb exploded on the Bhopal–Ujjain Passenger train at Jabri railway station in Madhya Pradesh.
- 30 March – At least 52 people were injured after eight coaches of the Mahakaushal Express derailed near Kulpahar at Uttar Pradesh's Mahoba district.
- 15 April – At least 24 people were injured after eight coaches of the Rajya Rani Express derailed near Rampur in Uttar Pradesh.
- 19 August – 2017 Khatauli train derailment: At least 23 people were killed and 97 were injured after the Kalinga Utkal Express derailed near Khatauli in Muzaffarnagar district, Uttar Pradesh.
- 23 August – Auraiya train derailment: Around 100 people were injured after the Kaifiyat Express derailed between Pata and Achalda railway stations in Uttar Pradesh's Auraiya district around 2:40 IST.
- 29 August – The engine and nine coaches of the Nagpur–Mumbai Duronto Express derails between Vasind and Asangaon due to a landslide caused by heavy rains. No one was injured in the accident.
- 24 November – Three people were killed and nine were injured after the Vasco da Gama–Patna Superfast Express derailed near Chitrakoot in Uttar Pradesh.
- 24 November – At least 14 wagons of a coal laden freight train derailed between Goraknath and Raghunathpur in Odisha.

=== 2018 ===
- 25 April – The locomotive of the Pallavan Superfast Express derailed while entering Tiruchchirappalli Junction railway station at 6:27 IST due to a rail fracture and no injures were reported.
- 6 May – The locomotive of the Howrah-Mumbai Mail caught fire between Talni and Dhamangaon in Maharashtra, which resulted in the death of the train driver .
- 24 July – Five people were killed and four were injured after the passengers hanging out of the doors of the over crowded train were stuck by a wall near the St. Thomas Mount railway station in Chennai.
- 10 October – Seven people were killed as nine coaches of the New Farakka Express derailed near Uttar Pradesh's Raebareli.
- 19 October – Amritsar train disaster: At least 59 people were killed and more than 100 were injured when two trains ran into a crowd of spectators who were standing on the tracks watching the Dusshera festival celebrations near Amritsar in Punjab.

=== 2019 ===
- 3 February – Seemanchal Express derailment: Seven people were killed and 29 were injured after 11 coaches of the Seemanchal Express derailed near Sahadai Buzurg railway station in Bihar.
- 31 March – Six people were injured after 13 coaches of the Tapti Ganga Express derailed near Gautamsthan railway station in Bihar.
- 20 April – At least 15 people were injured after 12 coaches of the Poorva Express derailed near Kanpur Central in Uttar Pradesh.
- 29 August – Fire broke out in two coaches of the Telangana Express at Asaoti railway station in Haryana.
- 11 November – The train driver was killed and 18 passengers were injured when the Hyderabad MMTS local train collided with the Hundry Express near Kacheguda railway station in Hyderabad.

== 2020s ==
=== 2020 ===
- 8 May – Aurangabad railway accident: Sixteen migrant workers were killed when a freight train run over them when they were sleeping near the tracks in Aurangabad district in Maharashtra.
- 22 July – Three railway workers, who were engaged in a painting job, were killed after a twin WDM-3D locomotive ran over them near Vikarabad railway station in Hyderabad.

=== 2021 ===
- 17 January – The parcel van of the Malabar Express caught fire near Edavai railway station in Kerala's Thiruvananthapuram district with no casualties.
- 8 May – Two railway employees were killed after they were run over by the Konark Express when they were engaged in their routine track inspection work in Telangana's Mahabubabad district.
- 1 June – Two railway employees were killed after being hit by a freight train while repairing a railway signal in heavy rain near Ambur railway station in Tamil Nadu.
- 25 August – Four coaches of the Saraighat Express derailed near Chaygaon near Guwahati in Assam and no casualties were reported.

=== 2022 ===
- 13 January – Mainaguri train accident: Nine people were killed after the Bikaner–Guwahati Express derailed near New Domohani railway station in Mainaguri of West Bengal's Jalpaiguri district at around 16:50 IST.
- 13 February – An accident was averted after a shepherd spotted a broken rail on the New Delhi–Mumbai main line and reported it to the authorities.
- 4 March – A passenger was hurt after he slipped and fell between the platform and a moving train in Gujarat's Surat railway station.
- 4 April – Two people were injured after the Pawan Express derailed near Nashik in Maharashtra.

=== 2023 ===
- 2 January – Ten people were injured after 11 coaches of the Suryanagri Express derailed near Marwar Junction railway station at 3:27 IST
- 16 February – WAG-12B 60038, based at Saharanpur, was involved in an accident with WDG-4 70159. It hit the goods train head on in Sultanpur, Uttar Pradesh, and both remained on the tracks.
- 3 April – Three people including a two-year-old girl were killed and eight passengers suffered burns after a man set fellow passengers on fire on board an express train in Elathur, Kozhikode, Kerala.
- 15 May – A coach of the Chennai-Bangalore Double Decker Express derailed near Bisanattam, Kolar district in Karnataka at around 11:30 IST. However, no injuries or casualties were reported.
- 2 June – 2023 Odisha train collision: More than 1,200 people were injured and 296 died in India's deadliest train crash involving three trains near Bahanaga Bazar station in Odisha's Balasore district. At around 19:30 IST, 21 coaches of the Coromandel Express derailed after a collision with a stationery freight train loaded with iron ore and smashed into the rear of the 12864 SMVT Bengaluru–Howrah SF Express traveling on the adjacent track.
- 8 June – The last coach of the four-coach Nilgiri Mountain Railway derailed near Coonoor railway station in Nilgiris district, Tamil Nadu at around 15:00 IST with no major injuries.
- 9 June – A coach of the Chennai Central–Vijayawada Jan Shatabdi Express derailed near Chennai Central when traveling back to the parking shed at 14:30 IST.
- 11 June – The last coach of a Chennai suburban local EMU derailed near Basin Bridge railway station in Chennai with no casualties reported.
- 22 June – A coach of the Lokmanya Tilak Terminus - Chennai Central Weekly Express caught fire near Vyasarpadi railway station in Chennai due to a friction in the overhead power lines and no injuries were reported.
- 25 June – Two freight trains collided near Ondagram railway station in West Bengal's Bankura district at around 4:00 IST.
- 7 July – Three coaches of the Falaknuma Express caught fire between Bommaipally and Pagidipalli in Yadadri Bhuvanagiri district of Telangana and no casualties were reported.
- 23 August – At least 36 migrant workers from West Bengal were killed after the collapse of an under construction railway bridge over Kurung river on the Bairabi-Sairang line near Sairang in Mizoram.
- 26 August – Nine people were killed and 20 were injured after a fire erupted from an illegally smuggled cylinder in a special coach of the tourist Bharat Gaurav train stationed near Madurai in Tamil Nadu.
- 23 September – A fire broke out in the Sri Ganganagar–Tiruchirappalli Humsafar Express while crossing Valsad railway station in Gujarat and no injuries were reported.
- 26 September – A EMU train derailed and climbed on to a platform at Mathura railway station in Uttar Pradesh.
- 11 October – Four people were killed and more than 70 were injured after six coaches of the North East Express derailed near Raghunathpur Railway Station in Buxar district of Bihar at around 21:50 IST.
- 29 October – At least 14 passengers were killed and 50 were injured when two passenger trains collided at around 21:02 IST near Kottavalasa railway station in Andhra Pradesh's Vizianagaram district.
- 31 October – The Suhaildev Superfast Express derailed near Prayagraj, Uttar Pradesh and no casualties were reported.
- 15 November – Eight passengers were injured after a fire broke out in the Delhi-Darbhanga Superfast Express near Etawah in Uttar Pradesh.
- 13 December – Three people were killed and 34 were injured after portions of a 133-year old overhead water-filled tank collapsed on to the platform in West Bengal's Barddhaman railway station.

=== 2024 ===
- 28 February – At least two people were crushed to death and many more were injured after being hit by a train near Kalajhariya, Jamtara district, Jharkhand.
- 2 June – Early in the morning, MSN 60059, a Saharanpur-based WAG-12B was involved in an accident. A goods train overshot a signal on the DFC corridor near Sirhind Junction, Punjab, and hit another stationary goods train. Two loco pilots were injured in the incident.
- 12 June – A 16-year-old boy was run over by a train on the Darjeeling Himalayan Railway near Kurseong in West Bengal’s Darjeeling district.
- 15 June – A 62-year-old man from Kerala died as an improperly chained berth with its occupant passenger fell on him while he was lying on the lower berth of a sleeper coach of the Millennium Express.
- 17 June – 2024 West Bengal train collision: About 11 people were killed and at least 60 were injured after a freight train hit the rear of the Kanchanjungha Express near Rangapani railway station in Darjeeling district, West Bengal due to over-speeding and faulty signal.
- 18 July – Nearly 12 coaches of the Dibrugarh–Chandigarh Express derailed near Jhilahi in Gonda district of Uttar Pradesh, resulting in at least four dead and 32 injured.
- 30 July – Two people were killed and at least 20 were injured after 18 coaches of the Howrah–Mumbai CSMT Mail derailed near Jamshedpur in Jharkhand.
- 17 August – Nearly 22 coaches of the Sabarmati Express derailed near Kanpur in Uttar Pradesh after the train hit a boulder.
- 11 October – 2024 Tamil Nadu train collision: At least 19 people were injured after 13 coaches of the Bagmati Express derailed and caught fire after the train rammed the rear of a goods train stationed on a loop line at the Kavaraipettai railway station near Chennai in Tamil Nadu.
- 17 October- Around 15:55 IST, eight coaches (including the engine and power car) of Agartala–Mumbai LTT AC Express derailed at Dibalong (Diblong) station, Dima Hasao in Assam's Lumding division, on the Lumding–Badarpur Hills section. So, there were no deaths or major injuries reported.
- 25 October – The locomotive of Vivek Express got detached from the coaches while on the move near Katpadi Junction railway station in Tamil Nadu as the coupler broke.
- 26 October – A 69-year-old man was killed after he was struck by a loose brake shoe from a passenger train running from Rameswaram to Madurai in Tamil Nadu while he was walking near the railway track.
- 27 October – Mhow - Ratlam Fast Passenger, a DEMU caught fire between Runija and Naugaon stations in Madhya Pradesh.
- 28 October – Four passengers were injured when illegal fire crackers carried by the passengers ignited on a passenger train from Jind to Delhi near Sampla in Haryana.
- 2 November – Four sanitation workers from Tamil Nadu including two women were killed after the Kerala Express run over them while they were engaged in a cleaning work on a bridge over the Bharatapuzha River near Shoranur in Kerala.
- 9 November – A 35-year old railway worker was crushed to death after being trapped in the buffers between the locomotive and the power car, while decoupling the locomotive of Lucknow-Barauni Express at Barauni Junction, as the loco pilot accidentally reversed the locomotive instead of moving it forward for shunting.
- 13 November – A freight train derailed in Peddapalli district of Telangana, resulting in the cancellation of 39 trains and diversion of 61 trains.

=== 2025 ===
- 22 January – 2025 Jalgaon train accident: About 12 people including seven from Nepal were killed and 15 were injured when some of the passengers of Pushpak Express disembarked onto an adjacent railway line following a false fire alarm and were hit by the incoming Karnataka Express.
- 15 February – At least 20 people were killed and several injured in a stampede at New Delhi railway station when confusing announcements resulted in a rush to board a train for Prayagraj to attend 2025 Prayag Maha Kumbh Mela.
- 30 March – At least 11 coaches of the Bangalore-Kamakhya AC Superfast Express derailed near Nergundi station in Cuttack district, 1 dead and 8 injured as reported.
- 9 June - Five people were killed and nine were injured after several people riding on the outside of two passing Mumbai local trains collided with each other and fell off after experiencing a sudden jerk on a sharp curve near the Mumbra railway station.
- 21 June - One railway worker was killed and four passengers were injured when 15910 Dibrugarh-bound Avadh Assam Express collided with a maintenance trolley near Semapur Train Station in Bihar.
- 8 July - Three students were killed and four others including the van driver were injured as 56813 Villupuram-Mayiladuthurai passenger train hit a school van at a non-interlocked staffed level crossing between Capper Quarry and Alapakkam railway stations at around 7:45 AM in Cuddalore district of Tamil Nadu. The students and the van belonged to Krishnaswamy Vidyanikethan, a private CBSE school situated in Cuddalore.
- 4 November – 2025 Chhattisgarh train collision: A MEMU passenger train collided with a stationary goods train in Chhattisgarh, resulting in 11 deaths and 20 injuries.
- 20 December - The Sairang–Anand Vihar Terminal Rajdhani Express derailed in Assam's Hojai district after hitting a herd of elephants, resulting in the death of 7 elephants. This is the second worst train accident involving Indian elephants since the 2013 Chapramari Forest train accident.
- 29 December - A passenger died in a fire that engulfed two AC coaches of Train no. 18189 Tatanagar–Ernakulam Express at Yelamanchili railway station, under the Vijayawada division of South Central Railway, in the early hours of Monday. The other passengers had a miraculous escape. The cause of the fire is yet to be determined.

=== 2026 ===
- 22 January - The Gonda-Asansol Express collided with a truck parked at a level crossing between Kumrabad Rohini and Shankarpur stations in Deoghar. While the collision caused significant chaos and damage to the locomotive, a major disaster was narrowly avoided with no immediate passenger fatalities reported.
- 23 January - Three wagons of a goods train derailed at Rupsa station in Odisha’s Balasore district. No injuries were reported.
- 6 April - The Okha-Guwahati Express halted near Kanpur after panic arose due to smoke from a coach's wheels (suspected brake binding). While exiting the train, some passengers were struck by a passing train on an adjacent track, resulting in at least one confirmed fatality.
- 20 April - A coach of an empty local train derailed near Dombivli station in Mumbai, causing significant disruptions but no reported injuries.
- 27 April - One trolley of the fourth coach of the Mumbai-Solapur Vande Bharat Express derailed at a diamond crossing when entering Pune Junction railway station at around 7:30 PM. Although no injuries have been reported, this was the first time that a Vande Bharat Express had been derailed since its launch in 2019.

== See also ==
- Classification of railway accidents
- Commission of Railway Safety
- Traffic collisions in India
- List of rail accidents
- List of rail accidents by country
- List of accidents and disasters by death toll#Rail accidents and disasters
