= 2002 in rail transport =

This article lists events related to rail transport that occurred in 2002.

== Events ==
=== January events ===
- January – The Muskingum Electric Railroad, one of only six heavy freight electric railroads in the United States, closes.
- January 1 – The Bodensee–Toggenburg railway in Switzerland merges into the Südostbahn.
- January 2 – The Iowa Interstate Railroad operates its first unit coal train over the former Milwaukee Road mainline through Amana, Iowa.
- January 14 – The Strategic Rail Authority unveils its 10-year strategic plan for the British national railway network, including a £4.5bn investment in new trains, improved station facilities, track repair and signalling work.
- January 27 – St Albans railway line block signalling and electrification extended to Sydenham in Melbourne, Australia.

=== February events ===
- February – Australia’s National Rail Corporation's freight operations and assets are combined with the Government of New South Wales' FreightCorp and sold to Toll Holdings and Patrick Corporation as Pacific National.
- February 8 – Changi Airport MRT station on the Singapore MRT System is opened, giving Singapore Changi Airport its first rail link in 21 years.

=== April events ===
- April – David L. Gunn is appointed to head Amtrak by President of the United States George W. Bush, and David Laney joins the Amtrak Board of Directors.
- April 4 – General Motors Electro-Motive Division and Porterbrook are awarded a contract to build new diesel locomotives for the first open access rail freight carrier in Belgium.
- April 14 – Opening of KLIA Ekspres from Kuala Lumpur Sentral railway station to Kuala Lumpur International Airport in Malaysia.
- April 17 – Robert Krebs resigns as chairman of the board of directors of BNSF, and is replaced by company CEO Matthew K. Rose.
- April 29 – The first Class 390 Pendolino, operated by Virgin Trains West Coast in the UK, arrives at Euston station in London.

=== May events ===
- May – The Metrolink 91 Line (now the 91/Perris Valley Line) opens for service between Los Angeles and Riverside, California.

=== June events ===
- June - The NSW 86 class electric locomotives are retired from regular service.
- June 12 – The Talgo XXI trainset sets the land speed record for railed vehicles with diesel power at 256.38 km/h (159.3 mph).

=== July events ===
- July 1
  - Norges Statsbaner is privatised under the Norwegian Ministry of Transport and Communications.
  - The railroad dining car catering services of Mitropa, which was founded in 1916, are handed over to DB Reise & Touristik, a subsidiary of Deutsche Bahn.
- July 4 – General Motors Electro-Motive Division announces that it will build new locomotives for HSBC Rail; the locomotives will be leased by CargoNet for use in Norway north of the Arctic Circle and are expected to enter service after February 2003.
- July 26 – The German manufacturer of rail equipment, Vossloh, announces the acquisition of the French company Cogifer.
- July 30 – The Iowa, Chicago & Eastern Railroad takes over operations from the defunct I&M Rail Link in the north central United States.

=== August events ===
- August 1 – Deutsche Bahn opens the high-speed line between Frankfurt and Cologne, Germany.

=== October events ===
- October 11 – The prototype AVE Class 102 train (later used by track authority ADIF as test train Class 330) reaches speeds of 362 km/h (225 mph) during test runs.
- October 31 – BC Rail operates the last run of the Cariboo Prospector passenger train between Prince George and North Vancouver (city), British Columbia.

=== November events ===
- November 22 – The Toronto Transit Commission opens the Sheppard Subway, connecting the Sheppard-Yonge and Don Mills stations.
- November 23 – Expansion opens at Fremont-Centerville (Amtrak station).

=== December events ===
- December
  - National Express hands back its M>Train, M>Tram and V/Line public transport franchises in Victoria, Australia to the Government of Victoria due to financial instability.
  - The Tōhoku Shinkansen in Japan is extended from Morioka to Hachinohe.
- December 1 – Final 4.4 km (2.7 mi) section of the Rinkai Line between Tennozu Isle and Osaki Stations opens for service in Tokyo, Japan.
- December 7 – First section of Porto Metro opens in Portugal.
- December 10 – Inauguration of Belgian High Speed Line 2 (HSL 2 – Leuven<>Ans) by Prince Philippe, Duke of Brabant.
- December 10 – Inauguration of Hazi Aslanov (Baku Metro) station.
- December 15 – All first-class cars on the TGV become non-smoking cars.
- December 24 – First line of the Delhi Metro is inaugurated in India.
- December 27 – The first X'Trapolis train enters service with Connex Melbourne, Australia.

== Accidents ==
- January 18 – The Minot train derailment occurred in Minot, North Dakota on when a Canadian Pacific freight train derailed, spilling hazardous materials.
- February 6 – Charlotte's Dale train crash: collision of a commuter and a freight train near Durban in South Africa kills 24 people.
- February 20 – Al Ayyat train disaster at Reqa Al-Gharbiya in Egypt: a fire on a train running from Cairo to Luxor kills at least 383 and injures over 65.
- February 27 – Godhra train burning: 59 Hindu pilgrims die aboard the Sabarmati Express train burned by Muslim extremists at Godhra in the Indian state of Gujarat.
- May 2 – An eastbound Canadian National train collides with a trailer near Firmdale, Manitoba, Canada; about 20 cars carrying plastic pellets, benzene, glycol and hexane catch fire, forcing the evacuation of nearly 200 local residents.
- May 10 – The Potters Bar rail crash occurs at Potters Bar railway station, north of London, England, when a northbound West Anglia Great Northern Class 365 passenger train derails at high speed, killing seven and seriously injuring another eleven.
- May 13 – Jaunpur train crash: the Shramjivi Express, travelling from New Delhi to Patna, India, strikes a sabotaged section of rail and derails at Jaunpur, Uttar Pradesh, killing 12 people.
- May 25 – The Tenga rail disaster of May 2002 occurred at Tenga 40 km north-west from Maputo, Mozambique; there were 192 deaths with 167 injured.
- May 28 – Two BNSF Railway trains collide near Clarendon, Texas, killing one person and seriously injuring 3 others from jumping from the locomotives. The cause was repeated phone use by one of the engineers.
- June 4 – The Kasganj level crossing disaster happened near the town of Kasganj in Uttar Pradesh, India. An express train collided with a bus, killing 49 people.
- June 24 – In the Igandu train disaster, a large passenger train in Tanzania with over 1,200 people on board rolls backwards down a hill into a stationary goods train, killing 281 people.
- September 10 – At least 130 people are killed in the Rafiganj train disaster in India, where a passenger train derails on a bridge and falls into a river. Naxalite sabotage is suspected.
- September 15 - A Norfolk Southern freight train derails in Farragut, Tennessee resulting in a hazardous materials release of fuming Sulfuric acid and evacuation of more than 2,600 nearby residents for nearly three days. Damage was estimated at just over one million USD.
- December 21 – The Kurnool train crash happened in Kurnool district in Andhra Pradesh, India, when a passenger train derailed, killing 20 people.

== Awards ==
=== Japan ===
Awards presented by Japan Railfan Club

- 2002 Blue Ribbon Award: JR East E257 series Azusa / Kaiji EMU
- 2002 Laurel Prize: JR West KiHa 187 series DMU

=== North America ===
2002 E. H. Harriman Awards

| Group | Gold medal | Silver medal | Bronze medal |
|---|---|---|---|
| A | Norfolk Southern | | |
| B | | Metra | |
| C | | | |
| S&T | Terminal Railroad Association of St Louis | Conrail | |

Awards presented by Railway Age magazine

- 2002 Railroader of the Year: E. Hunter Harrison (BN, IC, CN)
- 2002 Regional Railroad of the Year: Reading Blue Mountain & Northern Railroad
- 2002 Short Line Railroad of the Year: Winchester & Western Railroad
