= Brahmaputra Mail train bombing =

Bombing of passenger train in India

The Brahmaputra Mail train bombing was a terrorist attack on a train travelling in Western Assam in Eastern India on 30 December 1996. The bomb wrecked three carriages of the train and derailed six more, killing at least 33 people.

== Bombing on the Brahmaputra Mail ==
The bomb was of unknown composition, and had been left next to the track between Kokrajhar and Fakiragram stations. It is likely the bomb was detonated by a remote-controlled device, and timed to cause maximum destruction, as the Brahmaputra Mail passenger service to New Delhi went past at high speed.

== Casualties and controversy ==
Official reports claimed that 33 people were killed in the explosion, but the remote region in which the blast occurred and government desires to minimize the impact of the attack has led some commentators to question this figure. Some have claimed that 100 fatalities is a more likely figure.

== Responsibility and context ==
The Indian government blamed the attack on a local separatist organisation, the Bodo Security Force, although there has been no claim of responsibility.

This was the first major incident involving Brahmaputra Mail, with a second occurring three years later in the Gaisal train disaster.

== See also ==
- List of terrorist incidents, 1996
- 2014 Chennai train bombing
- 2006 Mumbai train bombings
- Jnaneswari Express train derailment
- List of railway accidents and incidents in India
