= Jajpur derailment =

2009 railway incident in Odisha, India

Coordinates: 20.27°N 85.84°E

The derailment of the train occurred in the east Indian state of Odisha.

On 13 February 2009, a passenger train derailment occurred at 19:45 local time (14:15 UTC) near Jajpur in the eastern state of Odisha, India. Nine people were killed and 150 people were injured in the incident. Twelve carriages belonging to the Howrah–Chennai Coromandel Express are believed to have derailed following the train's departure from Jajapur Keonjhar Road station near Jajapur. The cause of the accident is currently unknown.

== Derailment ==
Following initial reports that the death toll was 10, two relief trains were dispatched to the scene. Eyewitnesses feared passengers were trapped in two of the derailed carriages. Medical and rescue teams from the Bhubaneswar headquarters of East Coast Railway converged on the scene of the accident and erected emergency lighting to speed up the rescue effort, which had been hampered by the dark. Local people assisted the emergency services in their rescue effort, with one local describing the accident as "horrible and serious". Union Minister of State for Railways R. Velu reached the spot on Saturday morning to take stock of the situation. A high-level inquiry had been ordered to ascertain the cause of the accident, he said.

Twelve of the 24 coaches of the superfast train derailed approximately 110 kilometres (68 mi) from the state's capital, Bhubaneswar. Some coaches of the train were lying over each other and many people were trapped under the mangled train cars. The injured were sent to local hospitals.

== Reaction ==
The Minister said the Railways would pay Rs. 500,000 each to the next of kin of those killed in the accident and a job each to the family of those killed.

Apart from providing free medical treatment, the Railways will pay Rs. 50,000 each to those seriously injured and Rs. 10,000 to other injured passengers.

== See also ==
- List of Indian rail accidents
- 2009 Slovak coach and train collision
- 2023 Odisha train collision
