= Gaisal train collision =

Railway accident in India

Coordinates: 26°11′03″N 88°05′22″E

- Location within West Bengal Location within India Location within Asia

Details
- Date: 2 August 1999
- Location: Gaisal, Uttar Dinajpur, West Bengal, India
- Country: India
- Incident type: Head-on Collision
- Cause: Signalling error and three of four tracks closed due to maintenance works

Statistics
- Trains: 2 Brahmaputra mail and Avadh Assam Express
- Vehicles: diesel locomotive class WDM-2
- Passengers: Approx 2,500
- Deaths: 285
- Injured: More than 300

The Gaisal train collision occurred on 2 August 1999, when two trains carrying about 2,500 people collided at the remote station of Gaisal in West Bengal, India. Owing to a signalling error, both trains were using the same track on a day when three of the four tracks on the line were closed for maintenance. Their combined speeds were so great that the trains exploded on impact, killing at least 285 people.

== Collision ==
The crash occurred at about 1:45 a.m. on 2 August, 1999, when the Avadh Assam Express from New Delhi collided with the Brahmaputra mail at Gaisal railway station, Uttar Dinajpur, West Bengal, 19 kilometers from Kishanganj. Through a signaling error at Kishanganj, the Avadh Assam Express from Delhi was transferred onto the same track as the mail train. No one on either train or in the signals and station master's office noticed the error. The staff at intermediate stations between Kishanganj and Gaisal also failed to notice that the Assam express was on the wrong track. As a result, Brahmaputra Mail train crashed headlong into the front of the Avadh Assam Express at Gaisal. The Avadh Assam Express WDM-2 locomotive was thrown high in the air, and passengers from both trains were propelled into the neighbouring buildings and fields by the force of the explosion.

== Failures ==
Three of the four lines at Kishanganj station were non-operational because a doubling of lines was in progress. Only one line was being used to carry the load usually carried by four: 31 trains per day. Track circuiting and interlocking were also not correctly functioning at the station, because of the work in progress.

Track circuiting is an electrical procedure by which the station master, and consequently the train driver, can know that the track ahead is occupied. The signals remain red, interlocking the track, which effectively means that the series of signals cannot be turned green unless the station master allows it. The signals can be changed from the relay room, which can only be opened jointly by the station master and the signal inspector. In such a situation, the points in the track have to be set manually by a "cranking" procedure, whereby a crank handle, available at stations, is rotated manually on the orders of the station master for setting the points, which are then clamped and locked. The entire process takes around 30 minutes.

The Avadh Assam Express driver, B.N. Roy, had already moved the train to the down line, and on the same track, B.C. Bardhan, heading the Delhi-bound Brahmaputra Mail, was traveling. The cause of the disaster was negligence by the manager of Kishanganj Railway Station: due to the track workers setting the wrong points manually, the Avadh Assam Express shifted to the down line rather than the up line. At the same time, incorrect information was passed to the next station that the Avadh Assam Express had been sent to the up line from Kishanganj station. The convergence point of the two trains was at Gaisal railway station (near to Kishanganj) where both trains collided.

According to witnesses, the engine of Avadh Assam Express jumped several feet high and the engine of Brahmaputra Mail rammed into several coaches of the Avadh Assam Express, resulting in one of the deadliest disasters of the Indian Railways.

The driver, B.N. Roy of Avadh Assam Express, failed to notice that all signals were facing the opposite side instead of the green light facing towards the locomotive as usual. The opposite green signals were for the driver of the Delhi-bound Brahmaputra Mail. If the station cabin of Kishanganj had checked that the green signals of the up line had not turned to red, the disaster could have been averted. Whenever any train crosses the "Advance Starter" point of a railway station, a green signal is turned to red either manually or automatically and again becomes green after the train crosses near one or two stations, a practice similar to block signaling.

Since the Avadh Assam Express had not touched the up line, green signals on the up line remained green and had not turned red. The cabin staff of Kishanganj railway station failed to notice the problem in time.

Assistant Station Master (ASM) of Kishanganj station, S P Chandra, later admitted to sending the Avadh Assam Express on the wrong (down) line, causing it to collide with the Brahmaputra Mail on August 1. Chandra's testimony was first presented by a preliminary inquiry report of Chief Commissioner of Railway Safety (CCRS). Immediately after the incident, Chandra absconded and was arrested in Katihar on August 10.

== Emergency services ==
The line was blocked by wreckage, and the Gaisal emergency services were utterly overwhelmed, as fire swept through the ruined vehicles and station buildings, killing many of the injured people trapped in the trains. Many vehicles and aid support services had to undertake the 14-hour drive from Calcutta to reach the site, by which time many of those they could have helped were already dead. Those who were picked up by rescuers were taken to hospitals in Kishanganj and Islampur, which were also overwhelmed by the scale of the disaster.

Heavy rains helped dampen fires the following day, and rescue workers began trying to separate the twelve mangled carriages of the train and identify the bodies contained inside. Many were unrecognizable and never identified. Many bodies were not even found.

== Death toll ==
The official death toll released was set at 285 killed and over 300 injured in the crash. Unofficial tolls have claimed that up to 1000 or even more were killed, including 90 soldiers. This is possible because although there were only 72 seats in each of the seven general compartments that were involved in the crash, all of them were crowded far beyond capacity. Moreover, there were many ticketless travelers who were not included in the official count. Because of the nature of the crash and fire, as well as the large number of ticketless people who may have been on the trains, the bodies could not be separately identified. There has also been speculation that explosives carried on the military train may have been the cause of the explosion following the impact, rather than the trains themselves. This has been denied by the Indian military, but has remained a controversial issue.

Railway Minister Nitish Kumar resigned on moral grounds; he was the second railway minister to do so after Lal Bahadur Shastri resigned in the wake of the Mahbubnagar and Ariyalur train accidents of 1956, which had a combined death toll of over 275.

== Other Indian rail disasters ==
This was the worst Indian rail disaster since the Firozabad rail disaster in 1995, and is comparable to the Bihar train disaster of 1981, in which as many as 800 people were reported to have died. No other rail accident in India matched the death toll of the accident until the 2023 Balasore train collision.

== See also ==
- 1981 Bihar train derailment
- 2004 Sri Lanka tsunami train wreck
- List of railway accidents and incidents in India
