= 2014 Chennai train bombing =

Train bombing at Chennai railway station

- Location: Chennai Central railway station, India
- Date: 1 May 2014
- Target: Guwahati–Bangalore Cantt. Superfast Express (S4 and S5 coaches)
- Attack type: Bombing
- Deaths: 1
- Injuries: 14
- Perpetrators: Students Islamic Movement of India; Indian Mujahideen

The 2014 Chennai train bombing is the explosion of two low-intensity bombs in the early hours of 1 May 2014, Thursday at Chennai Central railway station. The Bangalore–Guwahati Kaziranga Superfast Express which came from Bangalore and was going towards Guwahati was standing on platform 09 of Chennai Central railway station, when two blasts occurred in two coaches S4 and S5. The bombing killed one female passenger and injured at least fourteen others.

The Students Islamic Movement of India claimed responsibility for the attack, stating that it was in revenge for the removal of some Muslims from the train in 2012. Its affiliate the Indian Mujahideen is also suspected of involvement.

== Attack ==
The Guwahati-bound train from Bangalore, 12509-Guwahati–Bangalore Kaziranga Express, was scheduled to arrive at Chennai Central around 5:30 a.m. (IST), but it had arrived late around 7:05 a.m. (IST). While the train was stationed at Platform 9 of the railway station, two bombs exploded at the buffer of S4 and S5 coaches at 7:15 a.m. (IST). Upon hearing the explosion, panicked passengers rushed out of the train. One of the bombs had exploded under the seat of a 24-year-old woman, who was employed with Tata Consultancy Services in Bangalore. She was the only person killed in the attack, was travelling to her home town Guntur in Andhra Pradesh. Of the fourteen injured passengers, five were admitted in serious condition at Rajiv Gandhi Government Multi-speciality Hospital.

== Aftermath ==
=== Investigation ===
The damaged bogies were detached and the train was searched by a bomb-disposal squad and was then allowed to carry on with its onward journey. Following the incident police have mounted a massive search operation in all the trains. The cause of explosion and device used for it were being probed. A suspect who had been detained by Tamil Nadu Police was found to be innocent.

An investigation by a Special Investigation Team (SIT) has been ordered. A National Investigation Agency team was sent to Chennai to assist in the case. Tamil Nadu Chief Minister Jayalalithaa ordered a CB-CID probe into the blasts.

Initial investigation revealed that the bombs might have been planted in the train five to six hours before it blasted. Also, the devices used in the bomb were found to be similar to the one used in Patna rally bombing by Indian Mujahideen that occurred six months before.

=== Security measures ===
Immediately after the blasts, security was tightened across the major crowded areas of the state. Alerts have been sounded in the neighbouring state of Andhra Pradesh, with police checking all major railway stations across the state. Also, a high security red alert has been declared in the capital city of New Delhi.

=== Compensation ===
The deceased identified as 24-year-old woman travelling from Bangalore to Vijayawada, had been sitting in the seat where the explosion occurred. Union railway minister, Mallikarjun Kharge announced an ex-gratia of ₹ 1 lakh (100,000 Rupees, approximately US$1667) to the family of the dead woman, ₹ 25,000 for grievously injured and ₹ 5,000 for those with minor injuries. Tamil Nadu Chief Minister Jayalalithaa also announced a solatium of ₹ 100,000 to the family of the dead, ₹ 50,000 to those who suffered serious injuries and ₹ 25,000 to other injured people.

=== Fake bomb report ===
On the day following the bombing, an anonymous call about a bomb Express Avenue mall in Chennai was made, which resulted in closing of the mall for public for a few hours on 2 May and after searching the mall for suspicious objects, police declared it as a hoax. Similar bomb threat calls were made to an education institution and a suburban railway station in Chennai on the day after the bombing, which prompted the police to issue warning against such activities. Law enforcement was kept on alert for a while following the explosion and subsequent threats.

== See also ==
- Brahmaputra Mail train bombing
- 2006 Mumbai train bombings
- Jnaneswari Express train derailment
- List of railway accidents and incidents in India
- List of terrorist incidents involving railway systems
