= Alappuzha–Chennai Express =

Express train service between Alappuzha and Chennai

MGR Chennai Central Alappuzha Superfast Express
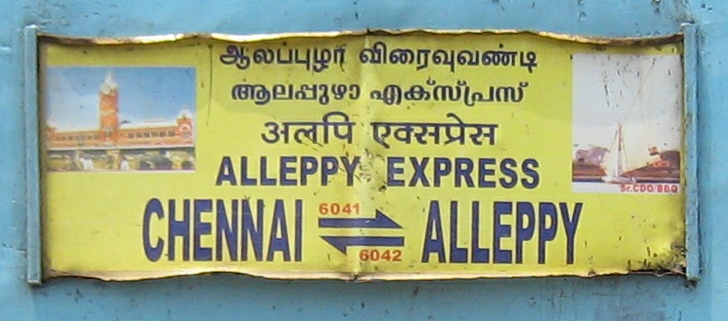
- MGR Chennai Central Alleppey Superfast Express

Overview
- Service type: Superfast
- Status: Operating
- Locale: Kerala and Tamil Nadu
- First service: 1 April 1966; 60 years ago
- Current operator: Southern Railway zone
- Former operator: South Indian Railway
- Ridership: Southern Railway

Route
- Termini: Alappuzha; MGR Chennai Central
- Stops: 23
- Distance travelled: 747 km (464 mi)
- Average journey time: 13 hours, 40 minutes
- Service frequency: Daily

On-board services
- Classes: AC 1st cum AC 2 Tier, AC 3 Tier, Sleeper class, Unreserved, SLR
- Disabled access: -
- Seating arrangements: Yes
- Sleeping arrangements: yes
- Auto-rack arrangements: YES
- Catering facilities: Pantry car not available
- Baggage facilities: Below the seats
- Other facilities: Toilets

Technical
- Rolling stock: LHB coach
- Track gauge: Broad
- Electrification: 100%
- Operating speed: 65 kilometres per hour (40 mph)
Route map
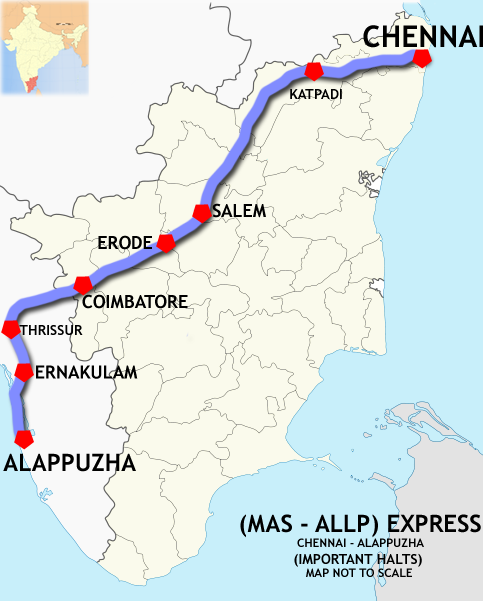

Alappuzha (Alleppey)–MGR Chennai Central Superfast Express is a class of Superfast Express train that runs daily from MGR Chennai Central to Alappuzha. It is one of the oldest trains in the Southern Railway zone of the Indian Railways.

== History ==
The train began its life as the 41/42 Madras Central (MAS)–Cochin Terminus (CHTS) Kerala Express on 1 April 1966. It was one of two new express trains introduced in the budget of Panampilly Govindha Menon (though he did not present the budget) for southern railway. The other express train being the West Coast Express. It was the first diesel express train to run south of Madras (with an Erode WDM-2). The scheduled departure from Cochin harbour terminus was at 08:00 pm and arrived in Madras Central at 10.00 am. The reverse train departed Madras central at 16:00 am and arrived at Cochin harbour terminus at 06:00 am (similar to timings of present-day Thiruvananthapuram -Chennai Express). It took much less time to reach Madras than the 19/20 mail (14 Hours vs 15 hours).

Initially, the 41/42 express was to be extended to Thiruvananthapuram in 1978 but instead during 1979, the 19/20 mail was extended. The 19/20 mail is the predecessor of the now Thiruvananthapuram–Chennai Central Mail. The 41/42 Express became the Cochin Express after its name "Kerala Express" was taken over by 125/126 Thiruvananthapuram–New Delhi Express.

The rake maintenance was done at Chennai Central. The train formerly used to have passenger quotas like Ongole quota, Navjivan quota, Coromandel quota etc. for long-distance travel from Madras Central. In the 1980s the train got its stoppage removed from Coimbatore due to infrastructural constrains on the Irugur Junction–Coimbatore Junction line. By 1982, the timings of the train had been reversed. Departure from Cochin was moved to 04:05 pm and was to reach Madras at 06:50 in the morning. The reverse Train departure from Madras was at 7:00 pm and arrival in Cochin at 10:00 am.

=== Extension to Alappuzha (1991–present) ===
During 1991, the historic train bid goodbye to Cochin Terminus as it was extended to the newly inaugurated line to Alleppey. It was renumbered 6041/6042 in 1990. In 2004 the train was to be converted to Superfast express category numbered 2681/2682, but due to strong protests, the move was not implemented. It was again renumbered 16041/16042 in 2005.The Government of Kerala, in 2012, has officially asked an extension of this train to Vikram Sarabhai Terminal in the state capital of Thiruvananthapuram but the demand was never materialised and from 23 Sep 2012, the train reentered Coimbatore junction, after nearly a gap of 30 long years after the double line via Irugur was commissioned. On 16 Jun 2014, the First Class non AC coaches were removed and have been replaced by a 3A coach. The train was upgraded to Superfast express category from 13-07-2014 with new train numbers 22639/22640.

The train's assigned number is 22639. The corresponding Chennai Superfast Express runs from Alleppey to Chennai (train number 22640).

== Coach composition ==
The train used to have all classes of accommodation, 1st AC, 2nd AC, 3rd AC, Sleeper class and General Sitting and now it shares its rake with the MGR Chennai Central –Thiruvananthapuram central Superfast Express.

Loco-WAP4 ERODE /ARAKKONAM	1	2	4	5	6	7	8	9	10	11	12	13	14	15	16	17	18	19	20	21	22	23
	SLR	UR			S9	S8	S7	S6	S5	S4	S3	S2	|	B2	B1	A1	A2	UR | | | EOG				

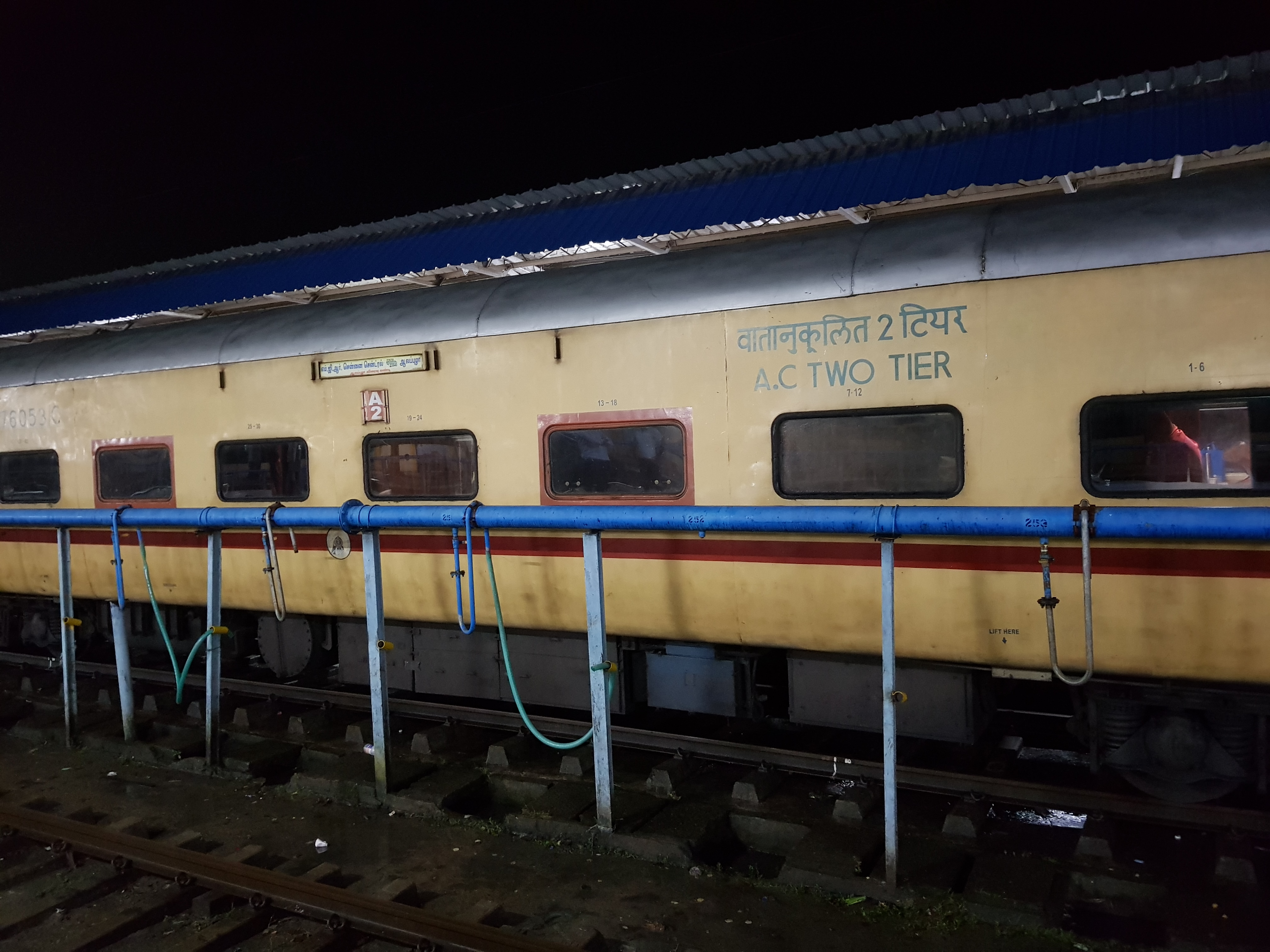
Alappuzha–Chennai Express standing in Palakkad Junction.

== Incidents ==
- Four people were killed and 49 injured on 6 December 1997 due to bomb blast when the Alappuzha bound train from Chennai reached Thrissur railway station
- Four students, who were walking along the railway track near Coimbatore under the influence of liquor, were killed after being hit by a Chennai-bound express train.

== Legacy ==
There is a movie called Cochin Express in Malayalam which is film in the 41/42 express.

== See also ==
- Thiruvananthapuram Mail
- Chennai Egmore–Guruvayur Express
- West Coast Express
- Kerala Express
- Cheran Superfast Express
- Nilgiri Express
