= Cochin Express =

- Poster
- Directed by: M. Krishnan Nair
- Written by: V. Devan; S. L. Puram Sadanandan (dialogues)
- Produced by: T. E. Vasudevan
- Starring: Prem Nazir; Sheela; Adoor Bhasi; Sankaradi
- Music by: V. Dakshinamoorthy
- Production company: Jaya Maruthi
- Release date: 28 October 1967
- Country: India
- Language: Malayalam

Cochin Express is a 1967 Indian Malayalam-language thriller film, directed by M. Krishnan Nair and produced by T. E. Vasudevan. The film stars Prem Nazir, Sheela, Adoor Bhasi and Sankaradi in lead roles. The film had musical score by V. Dakshinamoorthy. The film was subsequently made in Kannada as Bangalore Mail, in Telugu as Circar Express, in Tamil as Neelagiri Express, and in Hindi as The Train.

== Plot ==
Police Officer Rajan is in charge of investigating a murder that occurred on 41/42 Cochin Express (present day Alappuzha-Chennai Express) from Madras to Cochin. Unni Kannan Nair who was a passenger in the same compartment where the murder happened and is also the only person who saw a lady passenger that is suspected to be behind the murder.

== Cast ==
- Prem Nazir as Police Officer Rajan
- Sheela as Geetha
- Adoor Bhasi as Unnikannan Nair
- Sankaradi as Madhava Menon
- Devakibhai
- GK Pillai as Hotel Manager
- Kottarakkara Sreedharan Nair as Gangster
- Lakshmi
- A. Sakunthala
- Vijayalalitha as Geetha's disguise
- Prathapachandran as Police constable
- Thodupuzha Radhakrishnan as Telephone caller

== Soundtrack ==
The music was composed by V. Dakshinamoorthy and the lyrics were written by Sreekumaran Thampi.

No.	Song	Singers	Lyrics	Length (m:ss)
1	"Irathedi Piriyum"	S. Janaki, Chorus, Uthaman	Sreekumaran Thampi	
2	"Ethu Raavilennnariyilla"	P. Leela	Sreekumaran Thampi	
3	"Innunammal Ramikkuka"	V. Dakshinamoorthy, L. R. Eeswari	Sreekumaran Thampi	
4	"Chandamulloru Penmani"	K. J. Yesudas, L. R. Eeswari	Sreekumaran Thampi	
5	"Kadhayonnu Kettu"	S. Janaki	Sreekumaran Thampi	
6	"Kannukal Thudichappol"	P. Leela	Sreekumaran Thampi	
