= 2002 Jaunpur train crash =

Railway accident caused by sabotage

Coordinates: 25.754585°N 82.692581°E

- Location of Uttar Pradesh in India
- Location: Jaunpur, Uttar Pradesh, India
- Date: 13 May 2002; Time Unknown (UTC+5.5)
- Target: Civilian passenger train
- Attack type: Deliberate derailment of train
- Deaths: 12
- Injuries: 80
- Perpetrator: Student's Islamic Movement of India suspected

The Jaunpur train crash was a rail accident that occurred on 13 May 2002 in Uttar Pradesh, India. Subsequent investigation indicated that the cause was removal of plates that bind stretches of rail.

== Overview ==
The Shramjeevi Express was travelling from New Delhi to Patna when it hit a broken rail near Jaunpur, Uttar Pradesh shortly before 4 am on 12 May 2002. Carriages were thrown into the air and dragged off the rails, some into each other. Local people and emergency services rescued travellers from the wreckage. Eighty passengers were injured and received medical care at local hospitals. Twelve passengers in a carriage that rolled over were killed.

Police established that fishplates were missing from the rails, thus causing the rails to shift out of alignment as successive trains passed over them. The plates were found in the vicinity, suggesting deliberate removal.

== See also ==
- 1939 City of San Francisco Derailment
- 2005 Jaunpur train bombing
- Uttar Pradesh train accidents
