= 1998 Khanna rail collision =

1998 train collision near Khanna, Punjab, India

Coordinates: 30°44′09″N 76°10′22″E

Khanna rail disaster
- Location in Punjab, India 1998 Khanna rail collision (India)

Details
- Date: 26 November 1998; 03:15
- Location: Khanna
- Country: India
- Line: Northern Railway
- Operator: Indian Railways
- Incident type: Derailment and collision
- Cause: Broken rail

Statistics
- Trains: 2 * Jammu Tawi - Sealdah Express * Frontier Mail
- Vehicles: diesel locomotives WDM-2
- Passengers: 2500
- Deaths: 212

The Khanna rail disaster occurred on 26 November 1998 near Khanna on the Khanna-Ludhiana section of India's Northern Railway in Punjab, at 03:15 when the Calcutta-bound Jammu Tawi-Sealdah Express (yet later in 2018 was upgraded to Sealdah-Jammu Tawi Humsafar Express on the same route) collided with six derailed coaches of the Amritsar-bound "Frontier Mail" which were lying in its path. At least 212 people were killed; the trains were estimated to be carrying 2,500 passengers. The initial derailment was caused by a broken rail. The crash is among the deadliest rail accidents in India.

== See also ==
- List of train accidents by death toll
- 2023 Odisha train collision
- List of Indian rail accidents
