= Bihar train derailment =

Indian train accident near badlaghat

Coordinates: 25°34′20″N 86°35′25″E

- Location of the derailment

Details
- Date: 6 June 1981
- Location: Bagmati River, Badlaghat (near Khagaria), Bihar
- Country: India
- Incident type: Derailment
- Cause: Unknown, likely a cyclone

Statistics
- Trains: 1
- Deaths: 235 (official); >500 (estimate)

In the Indian state of Bihar, on June 6, 1981, a passenger train carrying more than 800 passengers between Mansi (Dhamara Pul) and Saharsa, derailed while crossing a bridge and plunged into the river Bagmati.

After five days, more than 200 bodies were recovered, with hundreds more missing that were feared washed away by the river. Estimates of total deaths range from 500 to 800 or more. By the afternoon of June 12, the government had completed its recovery efforts and had issued an official death toll of 235 passengers, with 88 survivors. The death toll included three people whose bodies were not recovered.

The crash is the deadliest-ever rail accident in India.

== Cause ==
The cause of the crash is uncertain and the events were not well documented. Theories as to the cause of the crash include a cyclone, flash flooding and brake failure.

== See also ==
- List of railway accidents and incidents in India
- 1999 Gaisal train disaster
- Lists of rail accidents
- List of rail accidents and disasters by death toll
