= Kurnool train crash =

Railway accident caused by sabotage

Coordinates: 15.2849°N 77.6019°E

- Location of Andhra Pradesh in India
- Location: Kurnool, Andhra Pradesh, India
- Date: 21 December 2002; 1:00 a.m. (UTC+5.5)
- Target: Civilian passenger train
- Attack type: Deliberate derailment of train
- Deaths: 20
- Injuries: 80
- Perpetrator: Lashkar-e-Taiba suspected

The Kurnool train crash was the derailment and crash of a passenger train in Kurnool district in Andhra Pradesh, India, on 21 December 2002.

The Kacheguda - Bengaluru City Superfast Express was an express passenger service traveling between Hyderabad and Bangalore; it entered the Kurnool district at 1:00 am, when it suddenly derailed, throwing the engine and seven carriages off the track and into one another. Twenty people were killed in the wreckage or died later in hospital, as local people flocked to the train to help those injured. Emergency services were able to respond quickly, so there was no fire, which could have claimed many more lives.

In addition to the dead, approximately 80 people were listed as injured, with around 30 requiring hospitalization in Gooty, the nearest town. The line was hastily cleared to allow service to resume as soon as possible. During the hasty repairs to the rails, it was discovered that one of the railway tracks had been recently and deliberately severed, which caused the derailment.

Sabotage is often claimed following rail crashes in India, which has approximately 100 domestic terrorist groups, some of which have been known to target trains, such as the Rafiganj rail disaster of two months previously. Sometimes, sabotage is suggested by politicians or railway staff to cover up their own mistakes or corruption which can lead to poor maintenance. Such was initially possible here, with many criticizing the premature announcement of sabotage as the cause by local police.

Further investigations discovered used hacksaw blades and cloth used to disguise the broken line at the scene. Investigators believe the saboteurs took several nights to cut through the rail, which was remote enough that no one would see them at work. Later reports agreed that the crash was caused by sabotage. No terrorist organisation took credit, and no motive for causing the crash could be established.

Thirteen months after the attack, police in Hyderabad arrested a man named Syed Abdul Nayeem, a Lashkar-e-Taiba activist, who failed a 'brainwave fingerprinting test' after being questioned by Indian police. He was charged with being involved in both this rail sabotage and a bombing which killed two people in the Sai Baba Temple.
