= Brezno train accident =

2009 railway incident in Slovakia

Coordinates: 48°51′05″N 19°52′11″E

The coach and train collision happened in central Slovakia. Above, Slovakia (dark green) on the European continent (light green) and in the European Union (light green).

The Brezno train accident was a train accident which occurred close to Brezno, Slovakia, on 21 February 2009, when a train collided with a tourist coach on a level crossing. Twelve people were killed and at least twenty people were injured in the crash. All of the deaths and injuries occurred on the bus, which was pushed for tens of metres by the derailed train. The crash scene was close to the popular ski resort of Polomka Bucnik, where the tourists were headed. The crash led to the third national day of mourning in Slovakia's history.

== Accident details ==
The accident occurred on a level crossing near Brezno at approximately 09:00 local time (08:00 UTC), according to the Slovak news agency TASR. Officials say the coach was travelling to the nearby ski resort. Thirty-six people were on the coach – all were from Bánovce nad Bebravou in western Slovakia. Martina Pavlikova, of Slovak Railways said: "All the dead and injured were on the bus. There were only a few passengers on the train and they didn't suffer any serious injuries". The train collided with the coach at full speed on a level crossing near the village of Polomka. The railway crossing only had a stop sign; there were no light signals and barriers to prevent vehicles from crossing. Several of the injured were in serious condition. Two people who sustained spinal injuries had to be airlifted to a hospital in Banská Bystrica, and the rest were taken to hospital in Brezno. In May 2011, the driver of the coach was banned from driving for four years and sentenced to 8.5 years in prison for his role in the accident.

== See also ==
- 2009 Orissa train derailment
- List of level crossing accidents
- List of rail accidents (2000–present)
