= Kasganj level crossing disaster =

Rail disaster in India

Details
- Date: 4 June 2002
- Location: Uttar Pradesh, India

Statistics
- Bus: 1 (local bus)
- Trains: 1 (Kanpur Central-Kasganj Express)
- Deaths: 49
- Injured: 29

The Kasganj level crossing disaster was the crash of a passenger bus with an express train near the town of Kasganj in Uttar Pradesh, India on 4 June 2002.

== Overview ==
At around 1 p.m. in the village of Chandi a local bus, carrying around 60 people came to a level crossing near Kasganj. The driver drove through the manned crossing barriers, which were open to road traffic, in front of an oncoming express train. The train driver, operating the Kanpur to Kasganj route, had no time to stop, and hit the bus at 113 kilometres per hour (70 mph), slicing the vehicle in two. The front half of the bus was thrown into a nearby canal, where it rapidly sank, drowning all those inside not killed in the initial crash. The rear of the bus was dragged along the track by the train, which came to a halt after 246 metres (807 ft).

Forty-nine people, all on the bus, died as a result of the crash and another 29 were injured, seven of them seriously.

== Aftermath ==
The statutory investigation report cited the fact that the manned crossing barriers were open to road traffic and not interlocked to protecting rail signals; it also identified that the train was dispatched in violation of standing instructions.

== See also ==
- Uttar Pradesh train accidents
- List of road accidents
