= Sealdah–Jammu Tawi Humsafar Express =

Sealdah - Jammu Tawi Humsafar Express
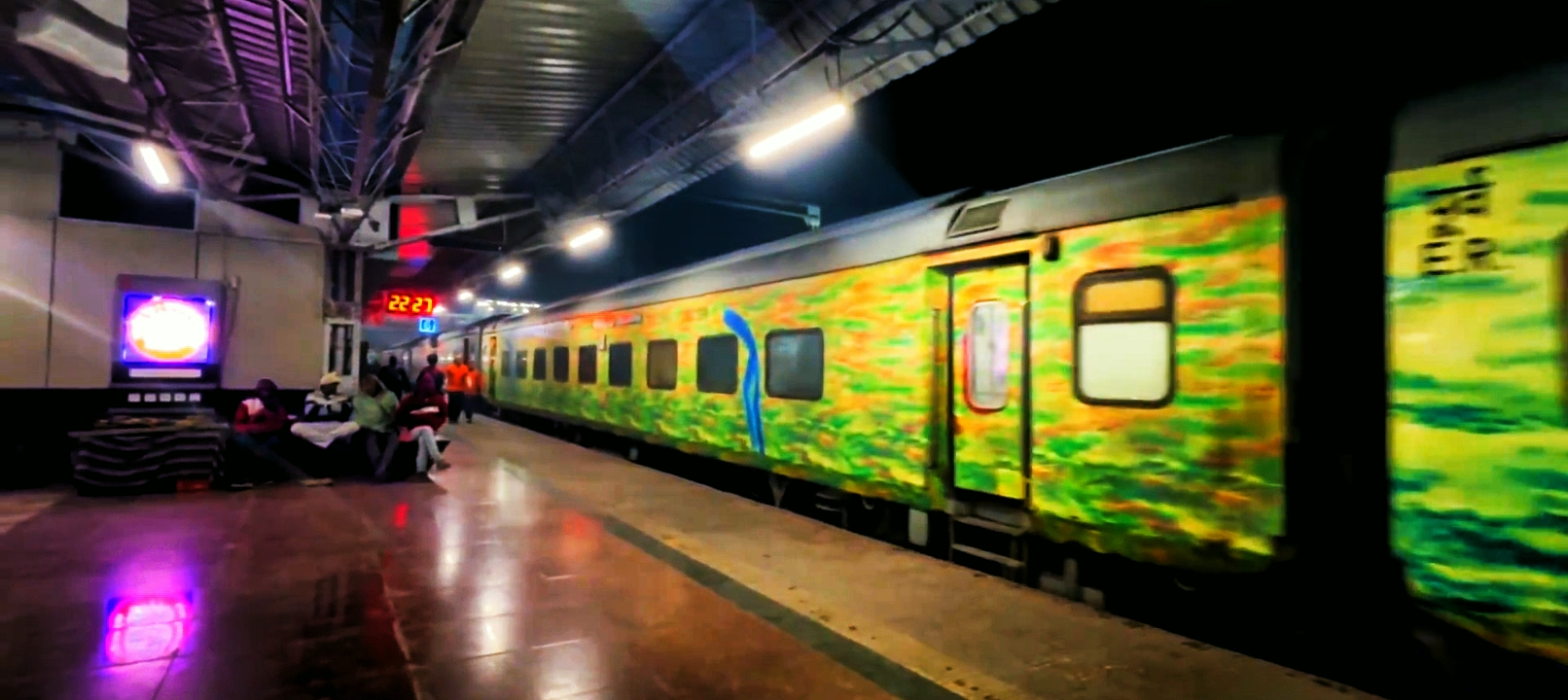
- Sealdah - Jammu Tawi Humsafar Express At Ambala Cantonment Junction railway station

Overview
- Service type: Humsafar Express
- First service: 4 July 2018; 7 years ago
- Current operator: Eastern Railways

Route
- Termini: Sealdah (SDAH); Jammu Tawi (JAT)
- Stops: 11
- Distance travelled: 1,948 km (1,210 mi)
- Average journey time: 34h 15m
- Service frequency: Weekly (Note: Runs once in a week for every direction.)
- Train number: 22317 / 22318

On-board services
- Classes: AC 3 tier, Sleeper
- Seating arrangements: No
- Sleeping arrangements: Yes
- Catering facilities: Available
- Observation facilities: Large windows

Technical
- Rolling stock: LHB Humsafar
- Track gauge: 1,676 mm (5 ft 6 in)
- Operating speed: Avg. Speed 57 km/h

The 22317 / 22318 Sealdah - Jammu Tawi Humsafar Express is a premium train service belonging to Eastern Railway zone that runs between Sealdah and Jammu Tawi in India on a weekly basis. The train was inaugurated on 3 July, 2018. Earlier in 1998, the first name was Sealdah - Jammu Tawi Express which train encountered an worst tragedy involved in 1998 Khanna rail collision now on 3rd July 2018 this train was replaced by Humsafar Express on same route

== Coach composition ==
The train runs with 21 Linke-Hoffman Busch coaches, consisting of AC 3-Tier and Sleeper class coaches. It has a single rake, which it shares with Sealdah - Jalpaiguri Road Humsafar Express. The primary maintenance of this train is executed at Sealdah.

Legends
EOG/SLR	PC	MIL	H	A	HA	B	AB	G	K	E	C	S	D	GEN/UR
Generator cum luggage van	Pantry car or Hot buffet car	Military coach	First AC (1A)	Second AC (2A)	First AC cum Second AC	Third AC (3A)	Third AC cum Second AC	Third AC economy (3E)	Anubhuti coach (K)	Executive chair car (EC)	AC Chair car (CC)	Sleeper class (SL)	Second seating (2S)	General or Unreserved
	Loco and other service coach													
	AC coach													
	Non-AC coach													

Coach position of 22317 (ex. Sealdah)

Loco	1	2	3	4	5	6	7	8	9	10	11	12	13	14	15	16	17	18	19	20	21
	EOG	S1	S2	S3	B1	B2	B3	B4	B5	B6	B7	B8	B9	PC	B10	B11	B12	B13	B14	B15	EOG

Coach position of 22318 (ex. Jammu Tawi)

Loco	1	2	3	4	5	6	7	8	9	10	11	12	13	14	15	16	17	18	19	20	21
	EOG	B15	B14	B13	B12	B11	B10	PC	B9	B8	B7	B6	B5	B4	B3	B2	B1	S3	S2	S1	EOG

Passengers are advised to check the coach position indicator at the station before boarding.

== Timings ==
- The 22317 Sealdah - Jammu Tawi Humsafar Express leaves Sealdah at 13:10 hrs every Monday and reaches Jammu Tawi the next day at 23:25 hrs.
- The 22318 Jammu Tawi – Sealdah Humsafar Express leaves Jammu Tawi at 07:20 hrs every Wednesday and reaches Sealdah the next day at 17:30 hrs.

== Traction ==
Since the route is fully electrified, the train is hauled by a Sealdah based WAP 7 or WAP-4 locomotive end to end.

== Route and halts ==
The stoppages are:-

- Sealdah
- Asansol Junction
- Dhanbad Junction
- Gaya
- Pt. Deen Dayal Upadhyaya Junction
- Varanasi
- Lucknow Charbagh
- Bareilly
- Moradabad
- Saharanpur
- Ambala Cantonment
- Ludhiana
- Jammu Tawi

== See also ==
- Humsafar Express
