= Gollagudem =

- Village
- Location in Telangana, India
- Coordinates: 17°43′N 80°37′E
- Country: India
- State: Telangana

Languages
  - Official: Telugu
- Time zone: UTC+5:30 (IST)
- Vehicle registration: TS

Gollagudem is a village in Nalgonda district in Telangana, India. It falls under Bibinagar mandal.
