= Jnaneswari Express train derailment =

2010 train accident in India

- Location: 22°21′34″N 87°09′09″E; West Midnapore, West Bengal
- Date: 28 May 2010; 2:30 IST (UTC+05:30)
- Attack type: Sabotage
- Weapon: explosives or bomb placed on tracks
- Deaths: 148+
- Injuries: 200+
- Perpetrator: Maoists Naxal group was responsible

On 28 May 2010, a Jnaneshwari Express train with WAP-4 electrified locomotive derailed at about 1 a.m. in the West Midnapore district of West Bengal, India (between the Sardiha and Khemasuli railway stations near Jhargram). It was disputed as to whether sabotage or a bomb caused damage on the railway track, which in turn led to the derailment, before an oncoming goods train with WAG-5 electrified locomotive hit the loose carriages, resulting in the deaths of at least 148 passengers.

== Background ==
A few weeks before the incident, Prime Minister Manmohan Singh had stated that Naxal attacks were affecting the profitability of the railways.

The derailment occurred 90 minutes after a Communist Party of India (Maoist) or CPI(Maoist) four-day bandh in the area began. It was termed a "black week" and security was put on high alert.

== Derailment ==
The state police chief stated that Maoist Naxalites claimed responsibility for removing a 46-centimetre (18 in) length of railway track. At 01:30 local time, a train with 13 carriages passing over the missing track derailed. The Howrah – Kurla Lokmanya Tilak Jnaneswari Super Deluxe Express with WAP-4 was travelling from Howrah to Mumbai. The derailed train was then struck by a goods train (pulled by WAG-5) travelling in the opposite direction. At least 148 people died and more than 180 people were injured. The missing track was between Khemasuli and Sardiha stations. A section of the rail track was found to be missing and fishplates were loosened, suggesting sabotage.

Initially, there was uncertainty as to whether the derailment was unintentional or the result of a bomb blast. Railway Minister Mamata Banerjee said a bomb blast was part of a "calculated attack" that caused the train to derail. She said that the train driver heard an explosion, and said that the Naxals have access to sophisticated bombs and improvised explosive devices.

== Rescue operation ==
Officially, 26 bodies were found, and a rescue team was working to find more bodies. Indian Air Force helicopters flew to the scene of the crash and airlifted some of the injured passengers to hospitals. The National Cadet Corps were also involved and a medical train was sent to the location.

== Investigation ==
During the course of the investigation into the derailment, Samir Mahato, a member of the Sidhu Kanhu Gana Militia — the militant wing of the People's Committee against Police Atrocities (PCPA) — was arrested by the Criminal Investigation Department (CID) of police from Jhargram in West Midnapore district. His was the second arrest made by the CID in the case after the prime accused Khagen Mahato.

== Responsibility ==
After the West Bengal police said that the Jnaneswari Express crash "appears to be the work of Maoists," the police found posters from the Maoist-affiliated Police Santras Birodhi Janosadharan Committee (PCPA) claiming responsibility at the site. A PCPA spokesperson, however, denied involvement in the incident, instead blaming the CPI(M) of "hatching a plot" to malign the Railway Minister and of attempting to distance the PCPA from the people.

== Reaction ==
Prime Minister Manmohan Singh expressed his grief over the loss of lives. The government of India said it would give Rs. 500,000 to the kin of the dead and offer jobs to family members. The government of West Bengal announced that it would bear the cost of treatment for the victims.

Finance Minister Pranab Mukherjee condemned the attack, although he was seen as unusually cautious in blaming Maoists for triggering the derailment. He also appeared to deny there was a blast, in contrast to his cabinet colleague Mamata Banerjee. "I am deeply saddened by the tragedy. It appears to be a case of sabotage where a portion of the track was removed. Whether explosives were used is not yet clear." Railway Minister Mamata Banerjee rushed to the location of the accident where she said she was aware of the Maoist-declared black days and security had been increased.

West Bengal Chief Minister Buddhadeb Bhattacharya condemned the attack. He said, "All our efforts have to be directed against this menace; on how the State and the country can be liberated from this threat ... We will sensitise our forces and we will counter this Maoist threat. We knew they would be observing this week, but we had no idea that they would be committing this dastardly crime." He also warned that "they are coming from all sides."

=== Political blame-game ===
A day after the attack Bhattacharya and Banerjee got into a war of words that was linked to the upcoming municipal elections in the province. It was alleged that Banerjee is backing pro-Maoist groups like the PCPA in her political battle against Bhattacharya's CPI(M).

Trinamool Congress is trying to mobilise all the anti-Left forces including the Maoists. Not just in Lalgarh but also in Nandigram and Singur where they have launched movements. In both the places, they took the help of the Maoists." Nirupam Sen, Industries Minister in the West Bengal government.

"What were the people and tribals of Lalgarh looking for? They were simply looking for dignity, security and relief from abject poverty. And what did they get in return? They got the lathis and bullets as they were terrorised by the CPI(M) and the police." Derek O'Brien, TMC spokesperson.

Banerjee later called the incident a political conspiracy, while hinting at the involvement of elements of the ruling CPI(M) party.

=== Naxals ===
A spokesperson for the CPI(M), Comrade Akaash, contacted the BBC and said the Naxals would investigate whether renegade factions may have been behind the attack. In regard to the Railways Ministry halting train traffic into Naxal affected areas during the night hours, Akaash said the Naxals would guarantee the safety and security of rail traffic into those regions.

== 2010 Accident Meets Another Same Tragedy ==
14 years later on 2024, at the same state. The 2024 West Bengal train collision occurred. the accident involved of Sealdah-based WAP-7 was hauled the passenger train Kanchanjunga Express and Goods Train hauled by electric freight locomotive WAG-9 carrying containers crashed into the rear of the Kanchanjunga Express. Resulting derailed last 3 coaches of first train , 11 deaths and more than 60 injuries

== See also ==
- List of Indian rail accidents
- List of terrorist incidents involving railway systems
- Rafiganj train disaster
- Timeline of the Naxalite-Maoist insurgency
