= Coromandel Express =

Train in India

Overview
- Service type: Superfast
- Locale: West Bengal, Odisha, Andhra Pradesh & Tamil Nadu
- First service: 6 March 1977; 49 years ago
- Current operator: South Eastern Railway

Route
- Termini: Howrah Junction (HWH); MGR Chennai Central (MAS)
- Stops: 14
- Distance travelled: 1,659 km (1,031 mi)
- Average journey time: 25 hrs 35 mins
- Service frequency: Daily
- Train number: 12841 / 12842

On-board services
- Classes: AC First Class, AC 2 Tier, AC 3 Tier, Sleeper Class, General Unreserved
- Seating arrangements: Yes
- Sleeping arrangements: Yes
- Catering facilities: Available
- Observation facilities: Large windows
- Baggage facilities: Available
- Other facilities: Below the seats

Technical
- Rolling stock: LHB coach
- Track gauge: 1,676 mm (5 ft 6 in)
- Operating speed: 130 km/h (80 mph) maximum, 69 km/h (43 mph) average including halts.

The Coromandel Express is a superfast express train of Indian Railways. The train runs down the east coast of India between Howrah Junction railway station, West Bengal, and M. G. R Chennai Central railway station, Tamil Nadu. The train service is run by South Eastern Railway zone. The route travels across the eastern coast of India along the Bay of Bengal, called the Coromandel Coast, so giving the service its name.

== History ==
The train was first run on 6 March 1977 as a bi-weekly train between (then) Madras and Howrah. The Coromandel Express was designed to be the equivalent of the Rajdhani Expresses running through the Coromandel Coast. At the time the train had a dining car. During COVID 19 the route was changed to Shalimar - MGR Chennai Central.

== Route ==
The route uses the Howrah–Chennai main line along the East Coast of India. The route includes a non-stop run between Chennai and Vijayawada, and it runs up to Visakhapatnam with two stops at Eluru and Rajahmundry. The other stops are Brahmapur, Khurda Road, Bhubaneswar, Cuttack, Bhadrak, Balasore and Kharagpur.

== Rakes ==
- 1 AC First Class (H1)
- 2 AC Two Tier (2A, A1-2)
- 4 AC Three Tier (3A, B1-4)
- 2 AC Three Tier Economy (3E, M1-2)
- 6 Sleeper class (S1-6)
- 1 Pantry car (PC)
- 4 General Unreserved (GS)
- 1 End on Generation car (EOG)
- 1 Sitting luggage cum brake van (SLR)

Loco	1	2	3	4	5	6	7	8	9	10	11	12	13	14	15	16	17	18	19	20	21	22
	EOG	GS	GS	S1	S2	S3	S4	S5	S6	PC	B1	B2	B3	B4	M1	M2	A1	A2	H1	GS	GS	SLR

== Loco Link ==
earlier this train runs with ICF rake and hauled by WAP-4. Now was run end to end by WAP-7 or WAP-4

12481 Coromandel Express
Loco	1	2	3	4	5	6	7	8	9	10	11	12	13	14	15	16	17	18	19	20	21	22	23
	EOG	H1	A1	A2	A3	M1	M2	B1	B2	B3	B4	B5	B6	B7	B8	PC	S1	S2	S3	GS	GS	SLR	HCPV

== Gallery ==
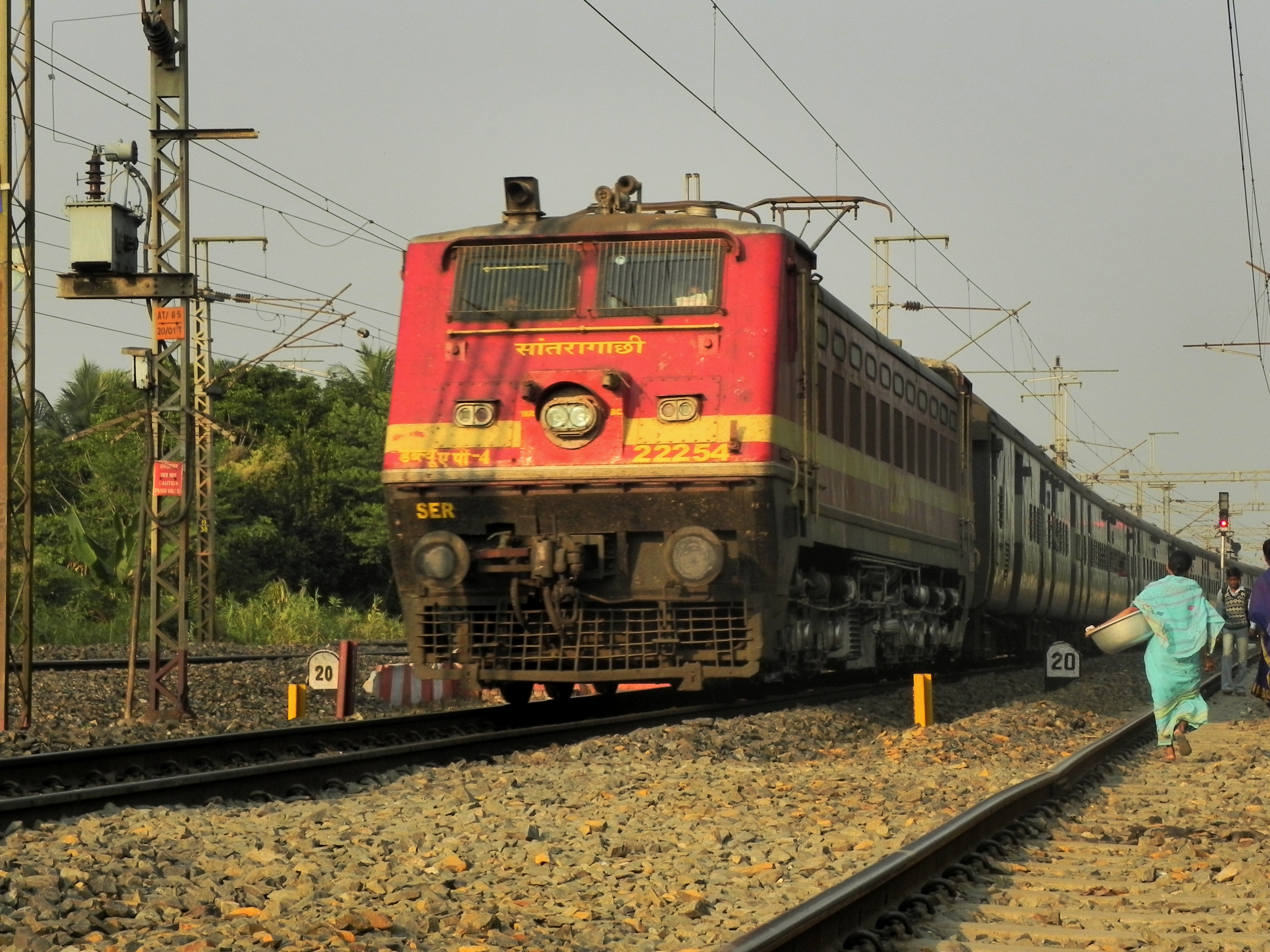
Coromandel Express at Nalpur

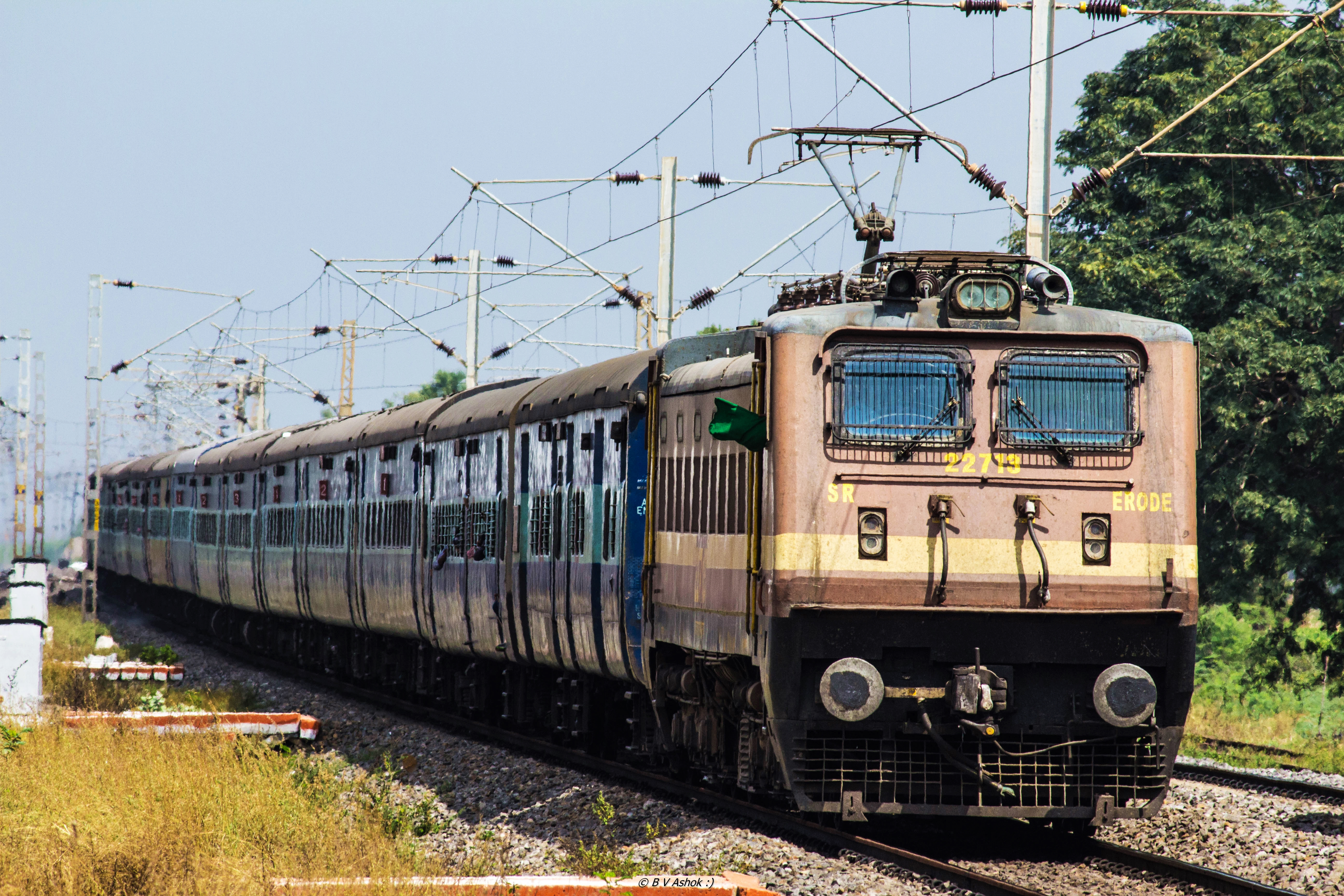
Coromandel Express at Andhra Pradesh

== Accidents and incidents ==
- On 15 August 1984, the derailment of 41 Up Coromandel Express at Chhatrapur near Berhampur in Odisha left 16 dead.
- On 15 August 1997, the 42 Down Coromandel Express collided with the Coromandel Express between Visakhapatnam and Brahmapur in Odisha killing 75.
- On 15 August 1999, the Coromandel Express derailed at Dusi, just crossing the Nagavalli River killing 50 passengers and injuring 500.
- On 15 March 2002, about seven coaches of the Howrah-Chennai Coromandel Express derailed around 14:40 at Padugupadu road over-bridge in Kovuru Mandal in Nellore district, leaving as many as 100 passengers injured. The poor condition of the main rail track in the Nellore district between Vijayawada and Chennai was suspected of being the cause of the accident.
- On 13 November 2009, the train derailed near Jajpur Keonjhar Road, about 100 km away from Bhubaneswar in Orissa killing at least 15 people and leaving several injured, some critically. The reason for the derailment is not known. A high-level inquiry was ordered by the Railways following the incident.
- On 14 January 2012, a fire broke out in a general compartment of the Chennai-Howrah Coromandel Express near Lingaraj railway station. However, the flames were extinguished before they could spread. The fire was spotted in the coach, second from the engine, when the superfast express train was proceeding towards Bhubaneswar, a spokesman for East Coast Railway (ECoR) said. No injury was caused to anyone, as the fire brigade was called in immediately and the fire was controlled within 20 minutes. All those on board the superfast train are safe. Prompt steps prevented the fire from spreading. The affected compartment was detached at Bhubaneswar railway station as a precautionary measure, and the train proceeded to its destination, the spokesman said. Preliminary information indicated that the fire might have erupted due to the carelessness of some travelers and an inquiry has been ordered into the incident, he added.
- On 30 December 2012, six elephants, including two calves, were killed after being hit by Coromandel Express in Odisha's Ganjam district. A bedroll attendant on the train also died in the crash, but the circumstances of his death were unclear.
- On 18 April 2015, a train caught fire at Nidadavolu Junction. Two of the bogies were damaged, said the report. No casualties were reported during the incident.
- On 2 June 2023, A Coromandel Express train was involved in an accident in Odisha. The accident is considered one of the deadliest rail accidents in Indian Railways' history with a death count of 296 and over 1,200 injuries. When the Coromandel Express crashed into an iron ore carrier train on the up loop line resulting derailed carriages then one of the wreck crashed into the rear of Howrah -SMVT Bengaluru SF Express on the adjacent track
