= Jawapur =

Village in Uttar Pradesh, India

- Village
- Location in Uttar Pradesh, India
- Coordinates: 27.16102°N 78.87999°E
- Country: India
- State: Uttar Pradesh
- District: Mainpuri
- Tehsil: Mainpuri

Area
  - Total: 12.752 km^{2} (4.924 sq mi)

Population (2011)
  - Total: 6,290
  - Density: 493/km^{2} (1,280/sq mi)
- Time zone: UTC+5:30 (IST)
- PIN: 205119

Jawapur (Jawāpur) is a village in Mainpuri block of Mainpuri district, Uttar Pradesh, India. It is located southwest of Mainpuri, on the Etawah branch of the Lower Ganga Canal. As of 2011, it had a population of 6,290, in 996 households.

== Geography ==
Jawapur is located about 16 km southwest of Mainpuri, on the road to Sirsaganj. The village is just on the north bank of the Etawah branch of the Lower Ganga Canal, and a bridge crosses the canal here. About 5 km to the southwest of Jawapur is the Kosma railway station.

== Demographics ==
As of 2011, Jawapur had a population of 6,290, in 996 households. This population was 52.8% male (3,318) and 47.2% female (2,972). The 0-6 age group numbered 1,082 (571 male and 511 female), or 17.2% of the total population. 1,176 residents were members of Scheduled Castes, or 18.7% of the total.

The 1981 census recorded Jawapur as having a population of 3,478 people, in 571 households.

The 1961 census recorded Jawapur as comprising 12 hamlets, with a total population of 2,612 people (1,422 male and 1,190 female), in 472 households and 351 physical houses. The area of the village was given as 3,237 acres.

As of 1901, Jawapur comprised 17 hamlets, had a population of 2,116, and had a small school teaching in the Hindustani language.

== Infrastructure ==
As of 2011, Jawapur had 2 primary schools; it did not have any healthcare facilities. Drinking water was provided by well and hand pump; there were no public toilets. The village had a post office and public library, as well as at least some access to electricity for all purposes. Streets were made of both kachcha and pakka materials.
