= Seemanchal Express derailment =

2019 train accident in India

- Location within Bihar Location within India

Details
- Date: 3 February 2019 around 03:58 am (IST)
- Location: Vaishali, Bihar
- Coordinates: 25°39′40″N 85°27′18″E
- Country: India
- Line: Barauni–Gorakhpur, Raxaul and Jainagar lines
- Operator: Indian Railways
- Incident type: Derailment

Statistics
- Trains: 1 (a LHB Seemanchal Express)
- Vehicles: WAP-7 locomotive
- Deaths: 6
- Injured: 30

The Seemanchal Express derailment occurred on 3 February 2019 near Sahdei Buzurg in Vaishali district of Bihar, India. Six people were killed and more than 30 were injured.

== Derailment ==
Investigations suggested that the derailment happened because of a fracture in the rail line. Because of the sudden impact on the broken rail, the locomotive and a few cars decoupled and overturned. A passenger who survived the crash described hearing a loud bang and falling to the floor of the train.
