= Arunachal Express =

The Arunachal Express was a train run by Indian Railways running from (Rangia) to Murkongselek (Dhemaji). Although named after the nearby state of Arunachal both its start and end are in Assam. The route is approximately 508 km.
