= 2002 Charlotte's Dale train collision =

Railway incident in South Africa

Coordinates: 29°23′36″S 31°15′46″E

The Charlotte's Dale train crash was the collision of a commuter train with a freight train in the town of Charlotte's Dale, 42 miles from Durban in South Africa on 6 February 2002.

== The collision ==
The commuter train was a regular service travelling from Durban to outlying towns and most of the passengers on board were school children returning home following the end of school shortly before. As it approached the town of Charlotte's Dale at 4.00pm, the train collided at high speed with the rear of a stationary freight train on the same line. The force of the crash derailed six coaches and crumpled several of them, trapping dozens of people in the wreckage. Local people helped those initially injured, but it took a team of over 200 emergency personnel several hours to cut the remaining casualties out of the train. The final toll was 24 dead including 16 children and 168 injured. The train did not catch fire, and many of the people trapped in the wreckage were later rescued alive.

== Cause ==
The crash was later determined to be the result of criminal damage to some railway signals and power lines, which meant that the passenger train failed to change track on its approach to the station, and piled into the stationary goods train on the original track. This damage was caused by unknown persons who stole copper wiring from the signal and power lines causing the signal and switcher to fail to respond when an operator tried to change them. Although the operator realized something was wrong, there was no time to contact the train and slow it down before the crash.
