= Jaunpur train bombing =

Bombing of express train in Uttar Pradesh, India

- Location: near Jaunpur, Uttar Pradesh, India
- Date: 28 July 2005; 17:15 (UTC+5.5)
- Target: Civilian passenger train
- Attack type: Bombing
- Deaths: 14
- Injuries: 62
- Perpetrator: Unknown organisation

The Jaunpur train bombing occurred on 28 July 2005, when an explosion destroyed a carriage of Shramjeevi Express train near the town of Jaunpur in Uttar Pradesh.

The Shramjeevi Express train was travelling in the afternoon between Jaunpur and Delhi when, at 5:15 pm, an explosion tore through one of the carriages. The train's crew was able to halt the engine quickly, thus preventing the train derailing following the blast. As other passengers and locals aided those wounded by the blast, emergency services fought to extinguish the burning carriage.

Thirteen people were killed by the blast, or died later from their injuries. A further 50 people required medical treatment, including several who underwent amputations. The cause of the explosion was traced to the carriage's toilet, where a bomb using the explosive RDX had detonated. RDX is a military grade explosive which had been used in several terrorist attacks on Indian targets, including the Ayodhya train bombing in June 2000.

Eyewitnesses reported two young men having boarded the train at Jaunpur with a white suitcase. Shortly afterwards, both of them leaped from the moving train into the fields without their suitcase. A few minutes later, the explosion shook the carriage.

Officials deemed it highly unlikely that this was an accidental explosion and authorities attributed it to Islamist extremists. In January 2024, two operatives of Harkat-ul-Jihad al-Islami were sentenced to death for perpetrating this terrorist act. The organizer was a man from Bangladesh and was assisted by a man from West Bengal.

== See also ==
- Uttar Pradesh train accidents
