= Gaisal railway station =

Railway station in West Bengal

Coordinates: 26°11′03″N 88°05′22″E

General information
- Location: National Highway 31, Dhantola, Gaisal, Uttar Dinajpur district, West Bengal; India
- Elevation: 62 m (203 ft)
- System: Passenger train station
- Owner: Indian Railways
- Operator: Northeast Frontier Railway
- Line: Howrah–New Jalpaiguri line
- Platforms: 3
- Tracks: 4

Construction
- Structure type: Standard (on ground station)

Other information
- Status: Active
- Station code: GIL
- Zone(s): Northeast Frontier Railway
- Division(s): Katihar

History
- Former names: East Indian Railway Company

Services
Preceding station	Indian Railways	Following station
Gunjaria towards ?	Eastern Railway zone Howrah–New Jalpaiguri line	Ikarchala towards ?
Location
- Location within West Bengal Location within India Location within Asia
- Interactive map

Gaisal railway station is a railway station on Katihar–Siliguri branch of Howrah–New Jalpaiguri line in the Katihar railway division of Northeast Frontier Railway zone. It is situated beside National Highway 31 at Dhantola, Gaisal of Uttar Dinajpur district in the Indian state of West Bengal. It is also remembered for the infamous Gaisal train disaster.

== Accident ==
At 1:45 am on 2 August 1999 Avadh Assam Express and Brahmaputra Mail collided near Gaisal railway station. The crash involved such high speeds that the trains exploded upon impact, killing at least 285 people and injured nearly 300.
