= 1956 Ariyalur train accident =

1856 train accident in India

Details
- Date: 23 November 1956
- Location: Railwaybridge over the Cauvery river Ariyalur
- Coordinates: 11.1196°N 79.0528°E
- Country: India
- Incident type: train plunges into the water
- Cause: collapsing of a bridge due to torrential rain

Statistics
- Trains: 1
- Passengers: 800
- Deaths: 154-250
- Injured: >110
- Damage: bridge train with 13 carriages

The 1956 Ariyalur train accident was a train accident on 23 November 1956 in Ariyalur, Tamil Nadu, India, where a train fell into the Marudaiyaru River, killing over 150 passengers after a bridge collapsed as a result of damage by torrential rain.

It was until then the worst train accident ever in independent India and is still one of the country's deadliest train disasters. The accident came 2.5 months after the 1956 Mahbubnagar train accident, a similar accident in Mahbubnagar.

== Event ==
Due to torrential rain, in the night of 23 November 1956, pillars of a bridge that ran over the Marudaiyaru River were heavily damaged by flooding at Ariyalur, Tamil Nadu, around two miles from Ariyalur railway station. Half an hour after a train crossed the bridge, the bridge collapsed when Express train number 803 from Chennai to Tuticorin with 800 passengers tried to cross the bridge. The train with 13 carriages plunged into the Marudyar river. The first seven carriages were fully submerged. Around 200 people were buried in the debris, many were never recovered. Due to the darkness, passengers mistook the river in full flow for sand, and drowned after they jumped into it.

During the day it was reported that around 250 people were killed. Two days later, "only" 150 bodies were recovered. With the exact number being unknown, as only the bodies that were found were counted, at least 154 people were killed and over 110 people were injured.

Indian railway minister Lal Bahadur Shastri wanted to take political and moral responsibility for the accident and offered his resignation to prime minister Jawaharlal Nehru. While it was not accepted after the 1956 Mahbubnagar train accident in September, it was accepted this time. He resigned on 7 December 1956.
