= 1956 Mahbubnagar train accident =

1956 train accident in India

Details
- Date: 2 September 1956
- Location: railway bridge near Mahbubnagar
- Coordinates: 16°45′02″N 78°04′09″E
- Country: India
- Line: Metre-gauge railway
- Operator: Government-owned Central Railway
- Incident type: train plunges into the water
- Cause: collapsing of a bridge due to torrential rain

Statistics
- Trains: 1
- Deaths: 125
- Damage: railway bridge train

The 1956 Mahbubnagar train accident was a train accident in Hyderabad state, India on the Secunderabad-Dronachalam line between Jadcherla and Mahbubnagar on 2 September 1956. A train fell into a river killing at least 125 passengers after a bridge collapsed as a result of damages by torrential rain.

It was at the time the worst train accident ever in India and the accident is still among India's deadliest train disasters.

Less than three months later, a very similar disaster, the 1956 Ariyalur train accident in Tamil Nadu, became India's latest and most deadly disaster when another train fell into the Marudaiyaru River, killing over 150 passengers when a bridge collapsed after torrential rain.

== Event ==
During the 1956 India floods, in the night of 2 September 1956, a single span 37-metres long railway bridge was heavily damaged by flooding in Hyderabad state, on the Secunderabad-Dronachalam line between Jadcherla and Mahbubnagar 5 miles from Mahbubnagar.

Just after midnight the bridge collapsed when a train tried to cross the bridge. The train and two passenger carriages plunged in the flooded river. A third carriage with second and third class passengers and a postal carriage with mail sorters remained hanging on the bridge.

At least 125 people were killed in the disaster. Only 22 victims of the two carriages in the water survived. Victims were stuck in the train carriages and others were thrown into the water. Forty bodies were recovered downstream, up to a mile from the scene. Bodies were transported to Hyderabad for identification. Most of the victims came from Secunderabad or Hyderabad. The mail that the train was carrying was lost.

== Aftermath ==
Shortly after the crash, a local resident cycled to Mahbubnagar, a route of 5 miles over muddy roads. The rescue operation was very difficult during the whole day due to the torrential rain. The Chief Minister of Hyderabad State Burgula Ramakrishna Rao went immediately to the scene of the accident. Officials of the Central Railways came to the disaster site by plane from Bombay. Relatives of the victims came en masse to the Hyderabad station and Secunderabad station to gain information about their relatives.

Indian railway minister Lal Bahadur Shastri took political responsibility for the accident and offered his resignation to Prime Minister Jawaharlal Nehru, who refused. After the 1956 Ariyalur train accident a similar accident about three months later, Shastri again offered his resignation and was accepted.

== Investigation ==
The conclusion of the investigation report was that the railway was to blame for the accident. It was inappropriate to have two bridges with risk guarded by only one employee. Next to that the responsible engineers were blamed.

Due to the drainage basin below the creek and the amount of possible precipitation during the monsoon season, the advice was to build additional culverts under the railway line.
