= Thiruvananthapuram–Chennai Mail =

Train in India

Puratchi Thalaivar Dr. M.G. Ramachandran Central Railway Station–Thiruvananthapuram Central Superfast Mail
Overview
- Service type: Superfast mail train
- Locale: Tamil Nadu and Kerala
- First service: 1944; 82 years ago (initial run from Madras Central to Cochin Harbour Terminus); 1977; 49 years ago (extended to Thiruvananthapuram Central)
- Current operator: Southern Railway zone

Route
- Termini: Chennai Central; Thiruvananthapuram Central
- Stops: 21 for 12624 and 20 for 12623
- Distance travelled: 926 km (575 mi)
- Service frequency: Daily
- Train number: 12623 / 12624

On-board services
- Classes: AC First, AC 2 Tier, AC 3 Tier, Sleeper class, General
- Seating arrangements: Yes
- Sleeping arrangements: Yes
- Auto-rack arrangements: No
- Catering facilities: Yes
- Observation facilities: Large windows
- Entertainment facilities: No

Technical
- Track gauge: 1,676 mm (5 ft 6 in)
- Electrification: 25 kV AC 50 Hz
- Operating speed: Average 58 kilometres per hour (36 mph), Maximum 130 kilometres per hour (81 mph)
Route map
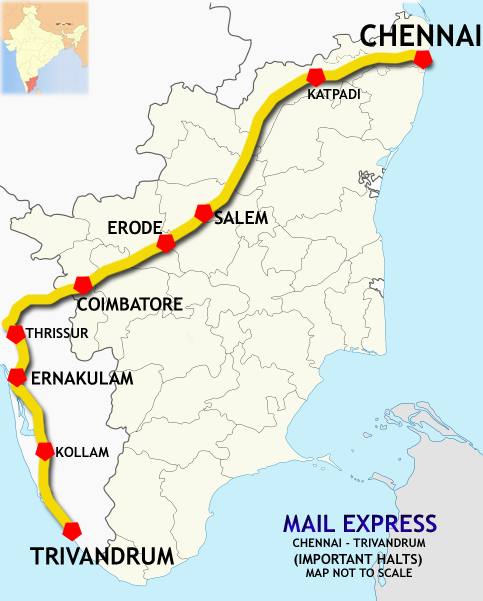

Chennai Central–Thiruvananthapuram Central S. F Mail is a daily Superfast Express mail train running between Thiruvananthapuram and Chennai Central under Southern Railway zone that connects the Capital city of Tamil Nadu Chennai with Thiruvananthapuram. the Capital City of Kerala. It is one of the prestigious train of the Indian Railways. This train runs via Kottayam. This train connects Chennai and Thiruvananthapuram along with six big cities in South India – Salem, Erode, Coimbatore, Thrissur, Kochi, and Kollam.

== History ==
Today's 12623/24 Chennai–Thiruvananthapuram Mail, is the successor to the 561/562 Cochin Harbour Terminus (in Kochi) –Madras Express that started running in 1944. It was then the second express train running through Kerala and the first from south Kerala. In 1960, it was renumbered as the 19/20 Cochin Harbour Terminus–Madras Express and in 1965 renamed the 19/20 Cochin Harbour Terminus–Madras Mail. It was then extended to Thiruvananthapuram Central in 1977 when the rail link connecting to Thiruvananthapuram Central via Kottayam was completed and in 1990 it was renumbered 6319/6320 and later 2623/2624.

== Interesting facts ==
It is the only daily train from Chennai to the South which does not have a halt at both Arakkonam Junction and Jolarpettai. The train was made to run via Irugur Podanur line due to single line constraints at Coimbatore Junction, later it was restored via Coimbatore Junction in 2014. This is the fastest train as 12623 between MAS - CBE and MAS - ERN. The train is meant for achieving its maximum speed between Katpadi and Basin Bridge Junction.

Conventional ICF coaches on the train were replaced by LHB coaches in January 2017. The train usually leaves from PF no: 5 or 9 from Chennai Central. This train is amongst the prestigious trains of the Southern Railway zone.

Total number of coaches 22

The train consists of:

- Loco HOG-enabled WAP-7 from Royapuram or Erode
- 1 AC First AC Coach (H1)
- 2 AC Two-tier coaches(A1, A2)
- 6 AC Three-tier coaches (B1, B2, B3, B4, B5, B6)
- 7 Sleeper coaches (S1–S7)
- 4 Unreserved General Sitting coaches (GS)
- 1 End on Generator
- 1 Luggage Cum LHB Second Sitting and Coach for Disabled

== Coach composition (Upward – 12623) ==
The train shares its rake with Cheran Superfast Express.

Loco	1	2	3	4	5	6	7	8	9	10	11	12	13	14	15	16	17	18	19	20	21	22
	LDSLR	GS	GS	S7	S6	S5	S4	S3	S2	S1	B6	B5	B4	B3	B2	B1	A2	A1	H1	GS	GS	EOG

== Route ==
Chennai - Thiruvananthapuram (12623)

MGR Chennai Central - Katpadi Junction - Salem Junction - Erode Junction - Coimbatore Junction - Palakkad Junction - Thrissur - Angamali for Kaladi - Aluva - Ernakulam Town - Trippunittura - Kottayam - Changanassery - Thiruvalla - Chengannur - Mavelikkara - Kayamkulam Junction - Kollam Junction - Varkala Sivagiri - Thiruvananthapuram Pettah - Thiruvanathapuram Central

Thiruvananthapuram - Chennai (12624)

Thiruvananthapuram Central - Varkala Sivagiri - Kollam Junction - Kayamkulam Junction - Mavelikkara - Chengannur - Thiruvalla - Changanassery - Kottayam - Trippunittura - Ernakulam Town - Aluva - Angamali for Kaldi - Thrissur - Palakkad Junction - Coimbatore Junction - Erode Junction - Salem Junction - Katpadi Junction - Avadi - Perambur - MGR Chennai Central

== Traction ==
- Earlier hauled by Arakkonam WAM-4 till Erode Junction and then change to diesel ALCO towards Thiruvananthapuram Central, later it was provided with WAP-4 till Ernakulam Town thereafter completed its journey to Thiruvananthapuram Central with twin diesel ALCO.
- After the electric traction till Thiruvananthapuram Central, the same was hauled by WAP-4
- It is now hauled by a WAP-7 of Royapuram shed or Erode shed.

== In popular culture ==
No.20 Madras Mail, which is a Malayalam movie released in 1990 has most of the scenes shot inside the moving Thiruvananthapuram Mail train.
