= Rafiganj train wreck =

2002 terrorist attack by Naxalites in north-central India

Coordinates: 24.8317°N 84.5117°E

Rafiganj train crash
- Location in Bihar, India

Details
- Date: 10 September 2002; 22:40
- Location: Rafiganj, Bihar, India
- Incident type: Deliberate derailment of train

Statistics
- Deaths: 130–200
- Injured: 150+

The Rafiganj rail disaster was the derailment of a luxury Howrah Rajdhani Express train led by Ghaziabad-based WAP-5 on a bridge over the Dhave River in North-Central India, on 10 September 2002. At least 130 people were killed in the crash, which was attributed in some reports to sabotage by a local Maoist terrorist group, the Naxalites.

== Accident overview ==
The crash occurred at 10:40 p.m., when the Eastern Railway's high-speed, luxury Howrah Rajdhani Express train travelling at a speed of 130 km/h derailed on a 300-foot bridge over the Dhave River near the town of Rafiganj near Gaya. It was led by a Ghaziabad-based WAP-5 locomotive.

== Train details and derailment ==
The train had left Howrah with over 1,000 people on board six hours before, and was heading towards New Delhi. Fifteen of the 18 train cars derailed and fell across the tracks, two of them tumbling into the river beneath. People from other carriages were also thrown into the water by the force of the crash.

== Rescue operations ==
Rescuers, including local military personnel, were hampered by the region's poor roads, which had become muddy due to recent rain. Locals attempted to give what aid they could, and 125 people were pulled to safety by morning, but nothing could be done for those trapped in the carriages that had fallen into the swollen river.

== Casualties ==
The death toll continued to rise in the following weeks. The river was searched for bodies, and several were found near villages downstream. The full death toll is unlikely to ever be known. In all, 130 bodies were recovered, but some sources claim that as many as 50 people are still missing. Some news reports give the figure of those killed as high as 200. At least 150 people were injured.

== Cause ==
The cause of the crash was not immediately clear, but it was originally thought that rust and metal fatigue on the colonial-era bridge contributed to a shift in the structure which cracked the rails, perhaps as a result of the heavy rains in the area. A railway employee said the bridge was known to be in poor state of repair, but as in the Kadalundi River rail disaster thirteen months earlier, nothing was done to repair the structure.

== Investigation and sabotage allegations ==
A later enquiry reported the cause as sabotage, pointing to missing "fish plates" which were intended to anchor the rails to the bridge. These had apparently been removed at some point shortly before the crash. The investigators reported that the plates had probably been removed by Naxalites, who were conducting a low-intensity guerrilla war at the time. The leaders of their organisation, the People's War Group had recently been arrested, and this was described as a being a revenge attack.

== Alternative theories ==
Other commentators have questioned this view, some claiming that fish plates were not missing at all, or that they were dislodged during the crash and fell into the river. Others assert that the fish plates may have been missing either through common theft for scrap metal or through the shifting of the weakened bridge shortly before the accident. The Naxalites themselves have not claimed credit for the "attack", and have never been known to target trains before.
