= List of terrorist incidents involving railway systems =

The following is a list of terrorist incidents involving railway systems:

== Before 1960 ==
Location	Date	Dead	Injured	Details	Perpetrators	Part of
Saint Joseph, Missouri, United States	3 September 1861	17	100+	Platte Bridge Railroad Tragedy: A Hannibal and St. Joseph Railroad train was wrecked after Confederate partisans sabotaged the supports of a bridge over the Platte River.	Bushwhackers	American Civil War
Schwarzenau, Austria-Hungary (now in Austria)	4 November 1875	9	81	A passenger train from Vienna Franz-Josefs-Bahnhof to Prague derailed due to the loosening of the fastenings of a piece of track on the outer rail in a curve that ran near the Schwarzenau station.	A destitute signalman	
Chillón, Spain	27 April 1884	59	81	Alcudia bridge disaster: A train plunged into a river after bridge supports were sawn off.	Unknown	
London, United Kingdom	26 April 1887	2	8	A bomb planted in a first-class compartment exploded on the Metropolitan Railway near Aldersgate St. station. The first fatal terrorist attack against what is now the London Underground, it is one of a series of bombings of the Underground and other London landmarks.	Fenians	Fenian dynamite campaign
Lincoln, Nebraska, United States	9 August 1894	11		1894 Rock Island railroad wreck: A locomotive pulling two passenger cars was derailed. There were signs that a 400-foot trestle had been purposely damaged, and it was ruled as sabotage.	Unknown (An African-American man, George Washington Davies, was initially convicted of second-degree murder for the crime, but was later paroled due to strong doubts over his guilt.)	
Litchfield, Illinois, United States	3 July 1904	24		A sabotaged switch led to the derailment of a Wabash Railroad train.		
Mentor, Ohio, United States	21 June 1905	21	25+	The New York Central Railroad's flagship passenger train, the 20th Century Limited, was derailed in an apparent act of sabotage.		
(British Raj) British India	7 October 1920	13	15	During a labour dispute on the Madras Railway, the Madras-Bangalore Mail (which would now be Chennai-Bengaluru) was derailed due to a sabotaged track	60 coolies arrested.	
(Weimar Republic) Germany	19 August 1926	21		A Berlin-to-Cologne express derailed on an embankment due to sabotage of the track. The locomotive and seven cars fell down the embankment and two cars were telescoped.	Two men were convicted and sentenced to death.	
(British Raj) British India (now in Myanmar)	28 January 1928	54	30	A mail train from Mandalay to Rangoon (now Yangon), was derailed by sabotage to the track at a bridge between Yindsikkon (now Yin Taik Kone) and Kyauktaga. The locomotive and four cars fell into the river 50 feet (15 m) below.	Dacoits (suspected).	
(Kingdom of Hungary (1920–1946)) Biatorbágy, Hungary	13 September 1931	22	120	The Vienna Express was derailed by a bomb planted by a man who claimed he got sexual pleasure watching trains crash.	Szilveszter Matuska	
(Second Spanish Republic) Puçol, Spain	9 December 1933	13	38	A train plunged into a river after as it passed over a bridge that had been bombed.	Anarchists	
(British Raj) Hazaribagh, British India	12 January 1939	21	71	On the East Indian Railway, saboteurs removed a 36-foot (11 m) length of rail. The locomotive of the Dehra Dun Express from Howrah made it across the gap, but the rest of the train was derailed.	Unknown	
Nevada, United States	12 August 1939	24	25+	1939 City of San Francisco derailment – An act of sabotage sent the City of San Francisco flying off a bridge in the Nevada desert; five cars were destroyed. The case remains unsolved.		
Tarnów, Poland	28 August 1939	20	35	Tarnów railway station bombing: A German agent placed a suitcase bomb at a busy railway station.	Antoni Guzy (Nazi German agent)	Lead up to the German invasion of Poland in World War II
(British Raj) Jairampur, Bengal, British India	5 August 1940	34	50	The Dacca Mail on the Eastern Bengal Railway was derailed 80 miles (130 km) from Calcutta (now Kolkata) by track sabotage.		
Suzhou, China	29 November 1940	100	300	Guerrillas operating in Japanese-occupied territory blew up the superstructure under a train traveling from Shanghai to Nanjing.	Kuomintang	Second Sino-Japanese War
(British Raj) Sindh, British India (now in Pakistan)	16 May 1942	22	26	Dacoits from a Sufi religious community sabotaged the track of the Punjab Mail train to Lahore between Tando Adam Khan and Odero Lal, derailing the locomotive and 6 cars. They then attacked the passengers and stole their valuables. Among the dead was a minister of the Sindh government.	Hur dacoits	
Rehovot, Mandatory Palestine	22 April 1947	8		Five British Army officers, two Palestinian Arab adults and a 3-year-old boy were killed when a military train was mined.	Lehi	1947–1948 civil war in Mandatory Palestine
Lydda, Mandatory Palestine	15 May 1947	2	11	Seven bombs exploded along train tracks, killing two British lieutenants.	Lehi	1947–1948 civil war in Mandatory Palestine
Tianjin, China	31 May 1947	100		A train was hit by landmine laid by guerrillas. The locomotive and the three following cars derailed and were damaged. The guerrillas then looted the train.	People's Liberation Army	Chinese Civil War
Lydda, Mandatory Palestine	9 August 1947	1		A British troop train was bombed, killing the engineer.	Irgun	1947–1948 civil war in Mandatory Palestine
Amritsar, India	22 September 1947	3418	1328	1947 Amritsar train massacre: A train carrying more than 4,500 Muslim refugees was ambushed and fired upon for three hours.	Armed Sikhs	Partition of India
Kamoke, Pakistan	25 September 1947	408 (per government report); Several thousand per other sources	587 (per government report)	1947 Kamoke train massacre: A train carrying Hindu and Sikh refugees was ambushed.	Armed Muslims	Partition of India
Haifa, Mandatory Palestine	29 September 1947	0	1	A British troop train was bombed.	Irgun	1947–1948 civil war in Mandatory Palestine
Gujrat, Pakistan	12 January 1948	1,300–1,600	150	1948 Gujrat train massacre: Hindu and Sikh refugees were killed after a clash between soldiers escorting the train and Pathans.	Armed Muslim Pathans	Partition of India
Rehovot, Mandatory Palestine	29 February 1948	28	35	Cairo–Haifa train bombings 1948: Jewish militants mined a British military train in retaliation for the Ben Yehuda Street Bombing. No civilians were hurt.	Lehi	1948 Palestine war
Binyamina, Mandatory Palestine	31 March 1948	40	60	Cairo–Haifa train bombings 1948: A British military train was mined by Jewish militants. Though some soldiers were on the train, all casualties were civilians.	Lehi	1948 Palestine war
Tokyo, Japan	15 July 1949	6	20	Mitaka incident: A train was possibly deliberately crashed into the Mitaka Station. The government blamed the Japanese Communist Party, as the incident happened in Red Purge era. The defendants who were members of Japanese Communist Party were acquitted, the only person convicted was not a member of a party and his guilt remains in doubt. Cause of the derailment remains unknown.	Keisuke Takeuchi (suspected)	
Matsukawa, Japan	17 August 1949	3		Matsukawa derailment: A Tōhoku Main Line train was derailed between Kanayagawa and Matsukawa stations, killing three crew members. The government blamed the Japanese Communist Party but later retracted.	Unknown	
Col des Nuages, French Indochina (now in Vietnam)	24 June 1953	100+		1953 Col des Nuages derailment: A passenger train crashed into a ravine after passing through a sabotaged viaduct.	Viet Minh	First Indochina War

== 1960s ==
Location	Date	Dead	Injured	Details	Perpetrators	Part of
(Francoist Spain) San Sebastián, Spain	28 June 1960	1	Several	Bomb attack at the Amara station by leftwing militants.	DRIL	
Siliguri, West Bengal, India	19 April 1961	23	77	A passenger train was derailed by a sabotaged track.		
Vitry-le-François, France	18 June 1961	28	100+	1961 Vitry-Le-François train bombing: A Strasbourg-Paris train was derailed by a bomb planted on the track. The fact that the derailment was deliberate was kept secret by the government for many years.	OAS	Algerian War
Lumding, Assam, India	20 April 1966	57	72	A train from Tinsukia to New Jalpaiguri was standing at Lumding Junction when a bomb destroyed several cars.	Naga rebels (suspected).	Ethnic conflict in Nagaland
Diphu, Assam, India	23 April 1966	41	81	A stationary train from Tinsukia to New Jalpaiguri was blown up by a bomb.	Naga rebels (suspected).	Ethnic conflict in Nagaland

== 1970s ==
Location	Date	Dead	Injured	Details	Perpetrators	Part of
Belfast, Northern Ireland, United Kingdom	21 July 1972	9	130	Bloody Friday: Three railway stations were among those targeted by 22 car bombs across the city within a span of 80 minutes.	Provisional IRA	The Troubles
London, United Kingdom	10 September 1973	0	38	Bombings of King's Cross and Euston stations: Attacks were carried out on two mainline stations.	Provisional IRA	The Troubles
San Benedetto Val di Sambro, Italy	4 August 1974	12	48	Italicus Express bombing 1974: A bomb exploded on the Italicus Express second-class train car before dawn. The first explosion was caused by a bomb; the second was thought possibly to be caused by a short circuit. The defendants, neo-fascists Mario Tuti, Luciano Franci, Piero Malentacchi, and Margherita Luddi were acquitted of planting the bomb on the Rome-Munich vacation express due to a lack of evidence in 1983.	Ordine Nero (claimed)	Years of Lead
Wijster, Netherlands	2–14 December 1975	3		1975 Dutch train hostage crisis: Seven terrorists hijacked the Hoogeveen-Beilen train with about 50 passengers held them hostage for twelve days, killing three hostages.	South Moluccan freedom fighters	
London, United Kingdom	4 March 1976	0	8	A bomb exploded on an empty electric multiple unit at Cannon Street, wounding people aboard an adjacent train.		
London, United Kingdom	15 March 1976	1	9	West Ham station attack: Premature detonation of an explosive inside a train, followed by the bomber opening fire inside the station.	Adrian Vincent Donnelly (Provisional IRA member)	The Troubles
Alexandria, Egypt	14 August 1976	8	51	A bomb exploded on a train loaded with workers and peasants at 10:45 am. The bomb was left on the luggage rack and exploded while the train was traveling from the yard to the station.	Libya (suspected)	Lead up to Egyptian–Libyan War
Moscow, Soviet Union	8 January 1977	7	37	1977 Moscow bombings: A series of bombings in Moscow, including on a crowded train between the Izmailovskaya and Pervomaiskaya stations of the Moscow Metro.	Unknown	
Glimmen, Netherlands	23 May – 11 June 1977	8	6	1977 Dutch train hostage crisis: Nine terrorists hijacked a train and held hostages for twenty days. Two hostages and six hostage-takers were killed before the M-Squadron raided the train.	South Moluccan separatists	
Belfast, Northern Ireland, United Kingdom	12 October 1978	1	0	A bomb exploded on a train near Belfast Central station before it was fully evacuated, killing a woman.	Provisional IRA	The Troubles
Madrid, Spain	29 July 1979	7	100+	July 1979 Madrid bombings: Coordinated bombings in Barajas Airport and Atocha and Chamartín train stations	ETA	Basque conflict

== 1980s ==
Location	Date	Dead	Injured	Details	Perpetrators	Part of
Dunmurry, Northern Ireland, United Kingdom	17 January 1980	3	5	Dunmurry train explosion: A premature detonation of an incendiary bomb occurred on board a Ballymena to Belfast passenger train service.	Provisional IRA	The Troubles
(People's Republic of Kampuchea) Romeas, Cambodia	10 June 1980	150+	250	Guerrillas stopped a passenger train 70 km (43 mi) northwest of Phnom Penh using an explosive, then opened fire.	Khmer Rouge	Cambodian–Vietnamese War
Bologna, Italy	2 August 1980	85	200+	Bologna massacre: An IED exploded at Bologna Centrale railway station. The attack was believed to be connected to Operation Gladio.	Nuclei Armati Rivoluzionari	Operation Gladio/Years of Lead
Ambazac, France	28 March 1982	5	28	Capitole train bombing: Bombing of a Le Capitole train on the Paris-Toulouse express near Limoges.	Carlos the Jackal	
Oslo, Norway	2 July 1982	1	0	Oslo Central Station bombing: Explosion of a homemade bomb in a locker of the station.	Unnamed 18-year-old man	
Tain-l'Hermitage and Marseille, France	31 December 1983	5	54	TGV train and Marseille station bombings: Two bombs went off on a high speed TGV train and another at the Gare de Marseille-Saint-Charles.	Carlos the Jackal	
San Benedetto Val di Sambro, Italy	2 December 1984	16	200+	Train 904 bombing: A bomb exploded in a train traveling between Florence and Rome.	Sicilian Mafia	Years of Lead
(People's Republic of Bulgaria) Bunovo, Sofia Province, Bulgaria	9 March 1985	7	9	A bomb exploded on a train traveling from Burgas to Sofia.	Pro-Turkish militants	
Bheramara, Bangladesh	15 May 1986	25	45	A crowded express derailed near Bheramara due to sabotage, with several cars falling into a river.	Sarbahara militants	
Lima, Peru	26 June 1986	7	38	A bomb blast on a train killed seven, including an American.	Shining Path	Internal conflict in Peru

== 1990s ==
Location	Date	Dead	Injured	Details	Perpetrators	Part of
London, United Kingdom	18 February 1991	1	38	Bombings of Paddington and Victoria stations: Attacks were carried out on two mainline stations.	Provisional IRA	The Troubles
Ludhiana district, India	15 June 1991	80-126		1991 Punjab killings: Sikh militants stopped two trains and massacred Hindu passengers on board. The incidents occurred five hours after polling closed for the 1991 Indian general election.	Sikh militants	Punjab insurgency
Ludhiana district, India	26 December 1991	49	20	Sikh militants massacred Hindu passengers aboard a train.	Sikh militants	Punjab insurgency
Quipungo, Angola	27 May 1993	355		A train derailed due to an attack by rebels.	UNITA	Angolan Civil War
near Asyut, Egypt	19 February 1994	0	4	Gunmen open fire on an Asyut-Luxor train from fields beside the railway track.	Unknown	
Baku, Azerbaijan	19 March 1994	14	49	1994 Baku Metro bombings - A suicide bombing at 20 January station. The lead railroad car was destroyed and the station's roof partially collapsed.	Sadval	
Baku, Azerbaijan	3 July 1994	13	58	1994 Baku Metro bombings - A remote controlled-gelatine explosive exploded on a train between 28 May and Gənclik stations.	Sadval	
Tokyo, Japan	20 March 1995	13	6252	Sarin gas attack on the Tokyo subway - Sarin Gas was released at 5 locations along the Tokyo Metro.	Aum Shinrikyo	
Paris, France	25 July 1995	8	80	1995 Paris Metro bombing - A gas bottle exploded in the Saint-Michel - Notre-Dame station of line B of the RER (Paris regional train network).	Armed Islamic Group	Algerian Civil War
(United States) Palo Verde, Arizona	9 October 1995	1	78	1995 Palo Verde, Arizona derailment - An Amtrak Sunset Limited derailed after rails were deliberately shifted out of position.	Unknown	
Colombo, Sri Lanka	24 July 1996	64	400+	1996 Dehiwala train bombing: Simultaneous detonation of suitcase bombs in four carriages on a commuter train.	LTTE	Sri Lankan Civil War
Paris, France	3 December 1996	4	170	1996 Paris Métro bombing: Bomb exploded in a car of an RER train at Port Royal station.	Armed Islamic Group	Algerian Civil War
Western Assam, India	30 December 1996	33		Brahmaputra Mail train bombing: The Kokrajhar-Fakiragram Junction mail train was destroyed by a bomb. The rail line was frequently by military trains as well which may have been the bomb's intended target.	National Democratic Front of Bodoland (suspected)	Assam conflict

== 2000s ==
Location	Date	Dead	Injured	Details	Perpetrators	Part of
Manila, Philippines	30 December 2000	22	120	Rizal Day bombings - Islamist militants bombed a train at the Blumentritt LRT Station as part of a series of bombings.	Jemaah Islamiyah (suspected)	Moro conflict
Angola	10 August 2001	252	165	2001 Angola train attack - Rebels derailed a train with an anti-tank mine between the towns of Zenza and Dondo and then attacked the passengers with small arms fire.	UNITA	Angolan Civil War
Jaunpur, Uttar Pradesh, India	13 May 2002	12	80	Jaunpur train crash - An act of sabotage caused the derailment of a passenger train.	Student's Islamic Movement of India (suspected)	
Rafiganj, Bihar India	10 September 2002	130	500?	Rafiganj train disaster - Derailment of a train on a bridge over the Dhave River, which was reportedly due to sabotage.	Communist Party of India (Marxist–Leninist) People's War	Naxalite–Maoist insurgency
Kurnool, Andhra Pradesh, India	21 December 2002	20	80	Kurnool train crash: Deliberate derailment of a passenger train.	Lashkar-e-Taiba (suspected)	Islamic terrorism
Mumbai, India	27 January 2003	1	28	January 2003 Mumbai bombing: A bomb placed on a bicycle exploded outside the Vile Parle railway station, killing a woman and injuring dozens of people.	Lashkar-e-Taiba (suspected)	Islamic terrorism
Mumbai, India	13 March 2003	10	70	2003 Mumbai train bombing: A bomb exploded on a train as it entered Mulund railway station.	Lashkar-e-Taiba (suspected)	Islamic terrorism
Stavropol Krai, Russia	3 September 2003	7	80	A blast ripped through a commuter train going from Kislovodsk to Mineralnye Vody.	Riyadus-Salihiin	Second Chechen War
Stavropol Krai, Russia	5 December 2003	46	170	2003 Stavropol train bombing (December) - A suicide bomber caused a blast which ripped through a commuter train going from Kislovodsk to Mineralnye Vody as it was leaving Yessentuki.	Riyadus-Salihiin	Second Chechen War
Moscow, Russia	6 February 2004	41	120	February 2004 Moscow metro bombing - A suicide bombing took place near Avtozavodskaya station.	Riyadus-Salihiin	Second Chechen War
Madrid, Spain	11 March 2004	192	2050	2004 Madrid train bombings - Ten near-simultaneous explosions between Alcalá de Henares and Madrid Atocha railway station during the morning rush hour. See Reactions to the 2004 Madrid train bombings.	Al-Qaeda	Islamic terrorism in Europe
London, United Kingdom	7 July 2005	56	700	7 July 2005 London bombings: Four explosions (3 on the London Underground and 1 on a bus) along the London transport network.	Al-Qaeda	Islamic terrorism in Europe
Jaunpur, Uttar Pradesh, India	28 July 2005	13	50	2005 Jaunpur train bombing - An explosion destroyed a carriage of an express train.	Unknown	
Varanasi, India	11 July 2006	28	101	2006 Varanasi bombings - Blast at the Varanasi Cantonment Railway Station following an explosion at the Sankat Mochan Hanuman Temple.	Lashkar-e-Taiba	Islamic terrorism
Mumbai, India	11 July 2006	209	714	2006 Mumbai train bombings - Seven explosions in eleven minutes rocked the Western Line on the Mumbai Suburban Railway.	Lashkar-e-Taiba	Islamic terrorism
West Bengal, India	20 November 2006	7	53	2006 West Bengal train disaster - A bomb exploded on a train near Belacoba station.	Unknown	
Panipat, Haryana, India	18 February 2007	68	50	2007 Samjhauta Express bombings - Bombs were set off in two carriages, both filled with passengers, just after the train passed Diwana station.	Abhinav Bharat or Lashkar-e-Taiba	Terrorism
Colombo, Sri Lanka	3 February 2008	12	92	Fort railway station bombing - Suicide bombing of a commuter train while it was stopped at Colombo's main railway station.	LTTE	Sri Lankan civil war
Colombo, Sri Lanka	26 May 2008	8	72	A packed commuter train carrying 200 passengers was blown up by a time bomb at Dehiwela railroad station.	LTTE	Sri Lankan civil war
Mumbai, India	26 November 2008	58	104	Part of 2008 Mumbai attacks: Three terrorists, including Ajmal Kasab, opened fire on the Chhatrapati Shivaji Terminus. This was the deadliest single incident of the attacks that killed 166 people in total.	Lashkar-e-Taiba	Islamic terrorism by Pakistani infiltrators
Bologoye, Russia	27 November 2009	27	95	2009 Nevsky Express bombing: A 7-kilogram (15 lb) explosive device derailed at least three of the 14 cars of the Nevsky Express on a journey from Moscow to St Petersburg while traveling at 200 kilometres per hour. A second bomb exploded during salvage operations.	Caucasus Emirate	Insurgency in the North Caucasus

== 2010s ==
Location	Date	Dead	Injured	Details	Perpetrators	Part of
Moscow, Russia	29 March 2010	40	102	2010 Moscow Metro bombings - A double suicide bombing at Lubyanka and Park Kultury stations of the Moscow Metro.	Caucasus Emirate; Al-Qaeda	Insurgency in the North Caucasus
West Midnapore, West Bengal, India	28 May 2010	148	200+	2010 Gyaneshwari Express derailment - A sabotaged railway track caused a train to derail before an oncoming goods train.	Communist Party of India (Maoist)	Naxalite–Maoist insurgency
Minsk, Belarus	11 April 2011	15	204	2011 Minsk Metro bombing: A nail bomb exploded at Kastryčnickaja station. Two men were arrested and executed in 2012.	Dzimitry Kanavalau and Vlad Kavalyou	
Kunming, China	1 March 2014	31	143	2014 Kunming attack: A group of 8 knife-wielding terrorists attacked passengers in the Kunming Railway Station	Uyghur separatists	Xinjiang conflict
Chennai, India	1 May 2014	1	14	2014 Chennai train bombing: Two bombs exploded on a train entering Chennai Central railway station	Indian Mujahideen (suspected)	
France	21 August 2015	0	1	2015 Thalys train attack: A self-proclaimed jihadist opened fire inside a Thalys train from Amsterdam to Paris and was subdued by passengers after his weapon jammed. The train was diverted to Arras where the gunman was arrested.	Ayoub El Khazzani	Islamic terrorism in Europe
Istanbul, Turkey	1 December 2015	0	5	2015 Istanbul metro bombing: A pipe bomb exploded near Bayrampaşa—Maltepe station.	Unknown	
Brussels, Belgium	22 March 2016	20	200	Part of 2016 Brussels bombings: Suicide bombing at the Maalbeek/Maelbeek station of the Brussels Metro about an hour after two other suicide bombers detonated at Brussels Airport	Islamic State	Islamic terrorism in Europe
Würzburg, Germany	18 July 2016	1	5	2016 Würzburg train attack: A 17-year-old Afghan refugee stabbed four people on a train before fleeing, stabbing another person outside before being shot dead by police.	Islamic State	Islamic terrorism in Europe
Madhya Pradesh, India	7 March 2017	0	10	2017 Bhopal–Ujjain Passenger train bombing: First Islamic State attack in India.	Islamic State	
Saint Petersburg, Russia	3 April 2017	15	64	2017 Saint Petersburg Metro bombing: A briefcase bomb packed with shrapnel exploded on a Saint Petersburg Metro train between Sennaya Ploshchad and Tekhnologichesky Institut stations.	Unknown	Unknown
London, United Kingdom	15 September 2017	0	30	Parsons Green train bombing: An explosion occurred on a District line train at Parsons Green Underground station.	Islamic State	Islamic terrorism in Europe
New York City, United States	11 December 2017	0	3	2017 New York City Subway bombing	Akayed Ullah	Terrorism in the United States
Utrecht, The Netherlands	18 March 2019	4	6	Utrecht tram shooting: Mass shooting on an Utrecht sneltram by a Turkish-born Islamic extremist	Gökmen Tanis	Islamic terrorism in Europe
Yuen Long, Hong Kong	21 July 2019	0	45	2019 Yuen Long attack: An armed mob dressed in white attacked passengers at Yuen Long Station of the MTR, most of whom were returning from protests against the 2019 Hong Kong extradition bill	Pro-Chinese Triad members (suspected)	2019–2020 Hong Kong protests

== 2020s ==
Location	Date	Dead	Injured	Details	Perpetrators	Part of
Balochistan, Pakistan	18 January 2022	0	5	A Jaffar Express train was hit by a bomb and derailed.	Unknown	Insurgency in Balochistan
Katari, Nigeria	28 March 2022	10	Unknown	Abuja–Kaduna train attack: A passenger train from Abuja to Kaduna was attacked by bandits, who detonated a bomb under the train and opened fire. 62 passengers were abducted, with the last of them being released on April 6	Bandits	Nigerian bandit conflict/Boko Haram insurgency
Dhaka, Bangladesh	5 January 2024	4	Unknown	A passenger train from Jessore to Dhaka caught fire in a suspected arson attack.	Unknown	2024 Bangladeshi general election
Jaffa, Israel	1 October 2024	9 (including 2 perpetrators)	17	2024 Jaffa shooting: Two men opened fire inside a rail carriage and a platform at Gush Dan Light Rail's Erlich Station before being fatally shot.	Hamas	Gaza war
Quetta, Pakistan	9 November 2024	32 (including the perpetrator)	55	2024 Quetta railway station bombing: A suicide bomber detonated at a platform inside Quetta railway station.	Balochistan Liberation Army	Insurgency in Balochistan
Kachhi District, Pakistan	11 March 2025	59 (including 33 perpetrators)	37	2025 Jaffar Express hijacking: Militants blew up railway tracks and hijacked the Jaffar Express train bound from Quetta to Peshawar, taking more than 400 people hostages including both security personnel and civilians.	Balochistan Liberation Army	Insurgency in Balochistan
Bryansk Oblast, Russia	31 May 2025	7	89	2025 Russia bridge collapses: A passenger train derailed and overturned after a bridge was blown up.	Ukraine (claimed by Russia)	Russo-Ukrainian War
Kursk Oblast, Russia	1 June 2025	1	2	2025 Russia bridge collapses: A freight train derailed after the bridge on which it was travelling was blown up.	Ukraine (claimed by Russia)	Russo-Ukrainian War
Jacobabad, Pakistan	18 June 2025	0	0	An explosive device detonated near a railway track, causing the derailment of several coaches of the Jaffar Express.	Unknown	Unknown
Mastung District, Pakistan	10 August 2025	0	0	Militants blew up railway tracks, causing six cars of the Jaffar Express passenger train from Quetta to Peshawar to derail.	Balochistan Liberation Army	Insurgency in Balochistan
Quetta, Pakistan	24 May 2026	47	98	2026 Quetta train bombing:A vehicle-borne suicide bombing targeted a shuttle train carrying Pakistani security personnel and their family from Quetta to connect with the Jaffar Express.	Balochistan Liberation Army	Insurgency in Balochistan

== Failed attacks ==
- Najibullah Zazi was arrested before attempting to bomb stations of the New York City Subway in 2009.
- Farooque Ahmed plotted to bomb Washington Metro stations in 2010.

== Bibliography ==
- Moody, G. T. (1979) [1957]. Southern Electric 1909–1979 (Fifth ed.). Shepperton: Ian Allan Ltd. ISBN 0-7110-0924-4.
- Semmens, Peter (1994). Railway Disasters of the World: Principal Passenger Train Accidents of the 20th Century. Patrick Stephens Ltd. ISBN 1-85260-323-2.
