= Railway accidents in Vietnam =

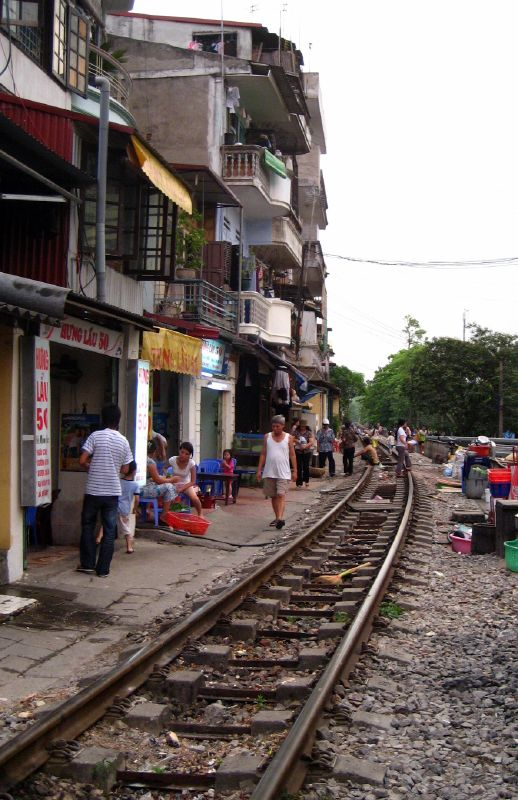
Residences directly adjacent to railway tracks in Hanoi.

Railway crashes and derailments in Vietnam are common. In 2010, 451 railway incidents were reported across the country's railway network, having caused 211 deaths and 284 injuries. A joint Japanese-Vietnamese evaluation team reported in 2007 that the poor state of railway infrastructure was the fundamental cause for most railway incidents, of which the most common types were train crashes against vehicles and persons, especially at illegal level crossings; derailments caused by failure to decrease speed were also noted as a common cause of accidents. As of 2010, around 90% of all railway incidents occurred at level crossings without safety fences, and most were said to have been caused by motorists failing to follow traffic safety laws.

Along with recent efforts aimed at infrastructure rehabilitation, the recent adoption of safety measures by national railway operator Vietnam Railways has led to a decline in railway incidents. These measures include: public awareness campaigns on railway safety in the media; construction of fences and safety barriers at critical level crossings in major cities; mobilization of volunteers for traffic control at train stations and level crossings, especially during holiday seasons; the installation of additional auto-signal systems; and the construction of flyovers and underpasses to redirect traffic.

== Statistics ==
According to statistics released by Vietnam Railways, 442 railway incidents were reported across the country's railway network in 2008, having caused 190 deaths and 262 injuries; most of these incidents were said to have been caused by motorists failing to follow railway safety regulations. By way of comparison, the number of fatalities due to railway incidents was recorded as 115 in 1998, and 82 in 1988. The following table gives recent statistics for railway incidents in Vietnam:

Railway incidents in Vietnam, 2007–2011
Year	Incidents	Fatalities	Injuries
2011	524	263	350
2010	451	211	284
2009	564	208	391
2008	442	190	262
2007	>530	230	n/a (Note: Statistics not available.)

As a whole, railway incidents account for 1.5% to 1.6% of all transportation incidents occurring in Vietnam, contributing to 1.8% to 2.35% of all fatalities and 0.7% to 0.8% of all injuries. Averaged over a ten-year period from 1988 to 1998, the number of railway incidents taking place at level crossings was recorded as 2,595, or 66.3% of all railway incidents during that period. This rate can also be expressed as 12.34 incidents per million train-km, which is 4 times higher than the incident rate in Canada, and 100 times that of India.

== Types of accidents ==
=== Collisions at level crossings ===
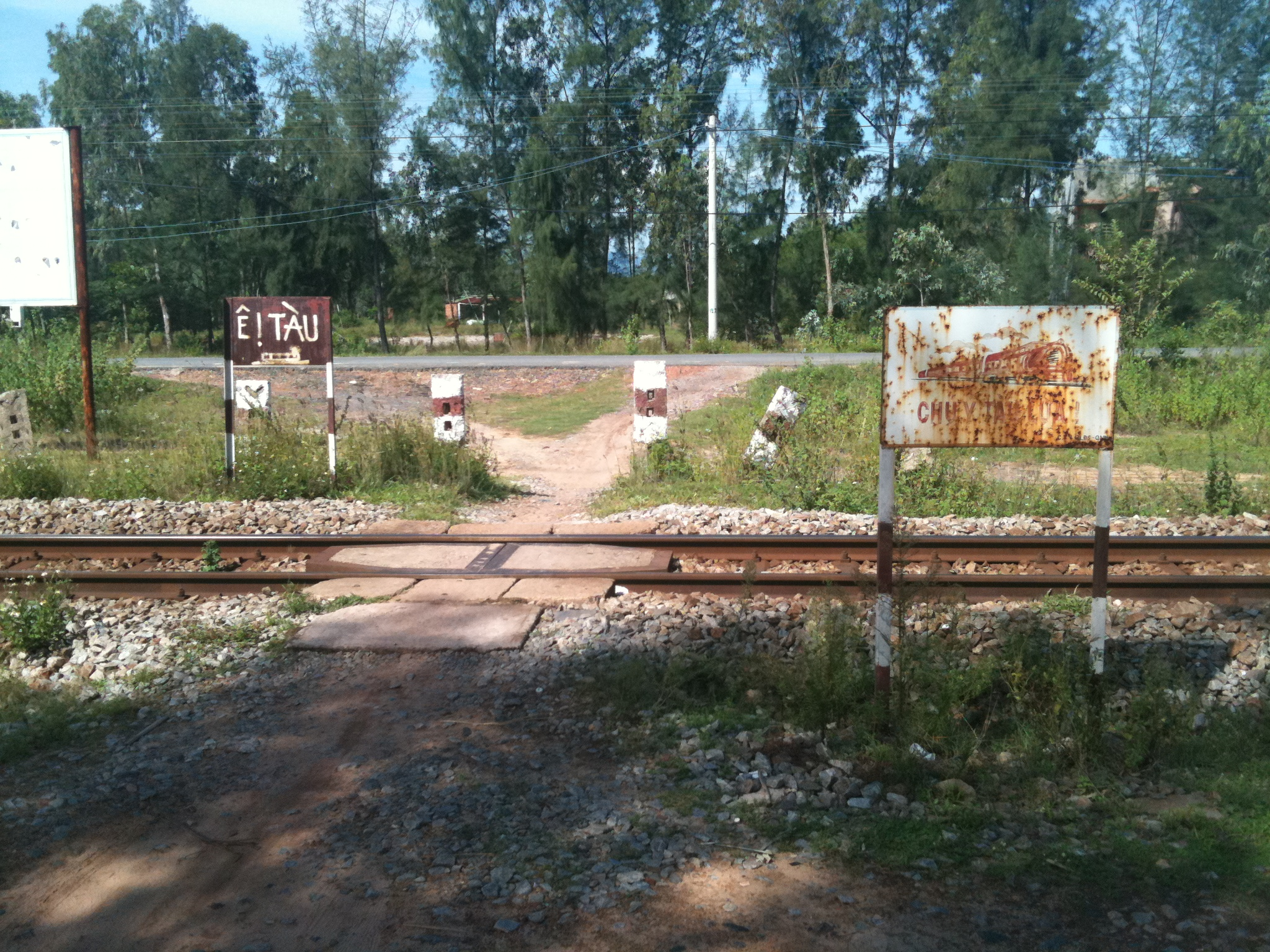
An unprotected level crossing near Da Nang.

Railway crashes in Vietnam occur mainly at unprotected or unauthorized level crossings; as of 2010, around 90% of all incidents were reported to occur at level crossings without safety fences. A study carried out by Vietnam Railways in 2010 noted that, out of 5,400 level crossings in Vietnam, only 750 (or 14%) were staffed or had alarm systems to signal the arrival of trains. Along the North–South Railway line, 3,650 level crossings were counted, 3,000 (or 82%) of which had no barriers, alarm systems or guards. The city of Hanoi, along with the provinces of Nghệ An, Khánh Hòa and Đồng Nai have the highest density of road-rail crossings.

While on a visit to Vietnam to evaluate infrastructure development projects sponsored by the Japan International Cooperation Agency (JICA), researcher A. Maria Toyoda noted "There are numerous safety issues with level crossings, residences right up against the tracks, and other areas of activity that are dangerously close ... People will cross the tracks at great risk, dodging in front of the train. ...usually, an accident occurs every day." In the first 10 months of 2009, 431 railway incidents reportedly took place throughout Vietnam, causing 166 casualties and injuring 319 people.

=== Derailments ===
Failure by train drivers to decrease speed along dangerous sections of track occasionally cause derailments; the 2005 Phú Lộc derailment is one such example, which led to 13 casualties and hundreds of injuries when a train derailed along the Hải Vân Pass between Da Nang and Huế. Weather can also be a factor in derailments, as seen on September 6, 2010, when a passenger train from Hanoi to Lào Cai was derailed by a landslide that followed several days of heavy rain, killing two people.

=== Bridge failure ===
Main railway lines have a maximum speed of 70 km/h (43 mph), but trains regularly slow to 30 km/h (19 mph) (and even 5 km/h (3.1 mph) in some cases) around bridges, many of which were damaged during the war and which still suffer from structural safety problems. Along with speed limits, weight limits are also in place on bridges. At least one major railway derailment, the 1953 Col des Nuages derailment, happened due to a bridge failure; however, the failure was due to a bomb attack carried out by the Viet Minh, rather than pre-existing structural weakness.

== Prevention ==
=== Rehabilitation and development ===
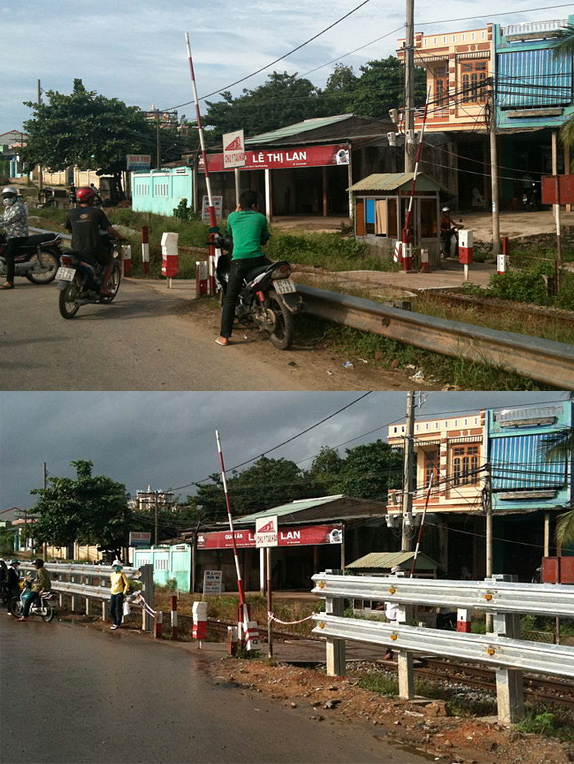
A level crossing in Da Nang, before and after the installation of full-height fences.

The condition of railway infrastructure in Vietnam, although improving, is still poor enough overall to require rehabilitation. Rail transport only became a national priority for the Vietnamese government around the mid-1990s, at which point most of the railway network was severely degraded, having received only temporary repair from damages suffered during decades of war.

From 1994 to 2005, a major bridge rehabilitation project took place on the North–South Railway line, with the Pacific Consultants International Group and Japan Transportation Consultants providing consultancy services. The overall project cost was JPY 11,020 million, or 18% less than the budgeted cost. The overall results of the project included a reduction in running hours from one end of the line to the other (from 36 hours in 1994 to 29 hours in 2007); an increase of speed limits on rehabilitated bridges (from 15 to 30 km/h (9.3 to 18.6 mph) to 60 to 80 km/h (37 to 50 mph)), which contributed to the reduction in running hours; and a reduction in the number of railway accidents throughout the line.

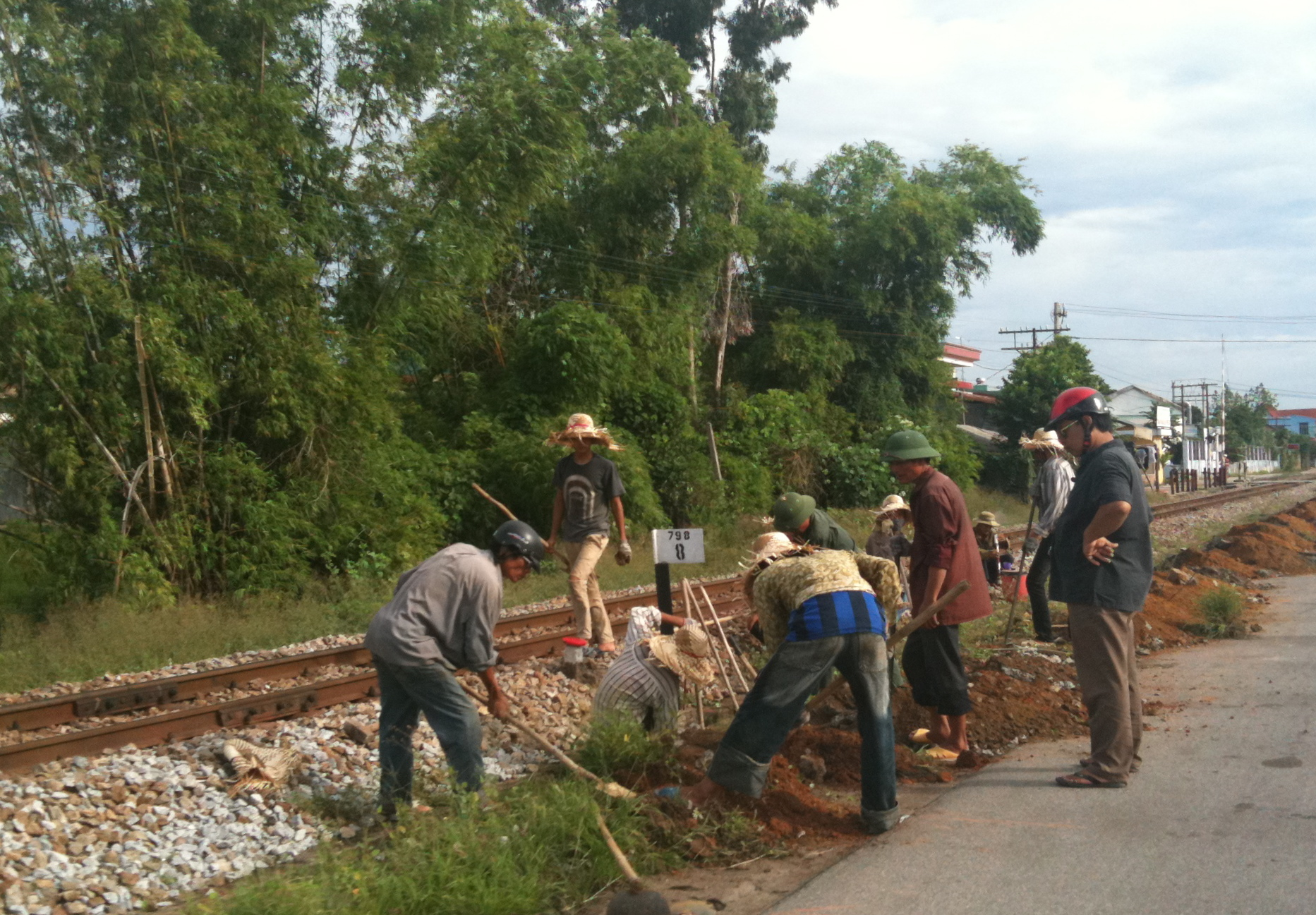
Workers dig up the shoulder near the North–South Railway, in Da Nang.

In 2007, Vietnam Railways awarded an additional VND 150 billion (US$9.5 million) five-year contract for consultancy services to Japan Transportation Consultants, the Pacific Consultants International Group, and the Japan Railway Technical Service (Jarts), regarding a VND 2.47 trillion project to further improve bridge and railway safety on the North–South line. The project's goals include the refurbishment of 44 bridges and 37.6 km (23.4 mi) of railway tracks, the building of two new railway bridges and a new railway station at Ninh Bình, and the purchase of 23 track machines. The project was expected to be completed in 2010.

Improving maintenance has been identified as a priority for the rail transport sector, specifically maintenance and repair work in rail workshops due to its direct impact on passenger safety. In some cases, a lack of proper maintenance of infrastructure can contribute to incidents even when safety measures are in place. On November 22, 2009, for instance, nine people were killed when a bus collided with a southbound train at a level crossing in Hanoi; one set of warning lights at the crossing was out of order, and the other set had collapsed. The replacement of old and damaged rolling stock is also a priority; a 2006 report by the Japanese Ministry of Foreign Affairs identified the poor condition of trains and rolling stock as a major cause in 50% of railway incidents.

Besides the above, Vietnam Railways has taken a number of other steps to improve railway safety, including the construction of fences and safety barriers at critical level crossings in major cities, the installation of additional auto-signal systems, and the construction of flyovers and underpasses to redirect traffic around railway lines.

=== Education and policy ===
A number of education and training initiatives have been proposed or carried out by Vietnam Railways. Public awareness campaigns in the media have been carried out to educate the public about railway safety. The training and professional development of train operators has also been suggested as a major area of focus. One train driver interviewed in 2009 reported that he had worked as a driver for Vietnam Railways for over 10 years without receiving any training or professional development to improve his skills, which he had learned in Russia. Checks on drivers have also been suggested, along with random blood testing to detect whether drivers have used alcohol.

The Japanese Ministry of Foreign Affairs has identified poor management practices and the weak enforcement of safety laws and regulations as contributing to railway incidents as well. To ensure the enforcement of safety laws, railway authorities have announced their intention to increase the number of spot checks on safety at level crossings, prevent people from using unauthorised crossings, and build more access roads to level crossings. Volunteers have also been mobilized to provide traffic control at both level crossings and train stations, especially during holiday seasons.

== List of notable accidents ==
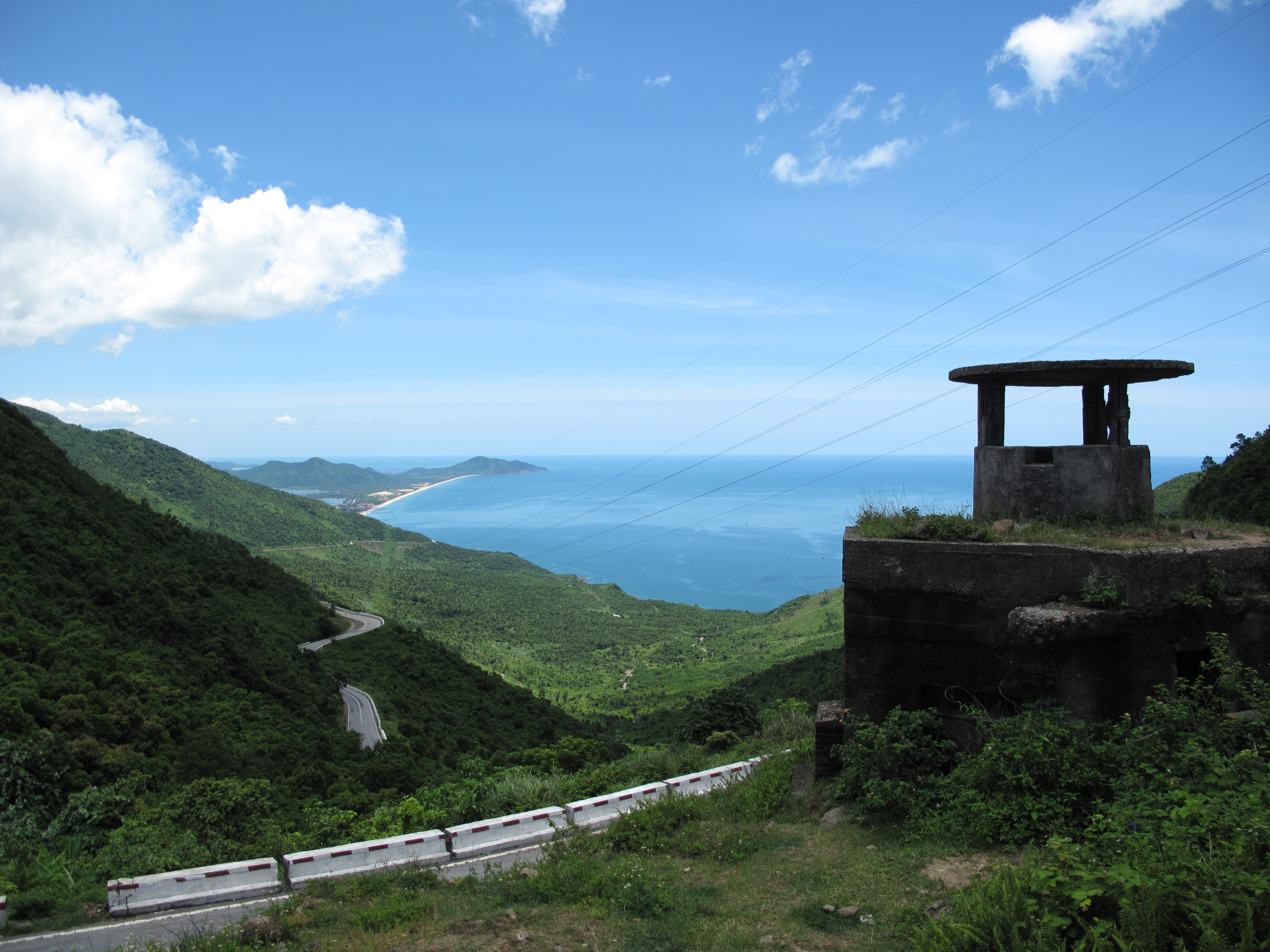
The Hải Vân Pass, the scene of one of Vietnam's earliest documented rail accidents.

As discussed above, the state of railway safety in Vietnam lends itself to frequent accidents, many of them fatal. Although listing them all would be impractical, certain notable accidents can be highlighted.

- June 24, 1953 – 1953 Col des Nuages derailment: "About 100 or more" were killed when two locomotives and 18 cars of a passenger train plunged 50 feet through a sabotaged viaduct in the Col des Nuages, now known as the Hai Van Pass. Officials said that a strong explosive charge went off just as the train arrived at the viaduct, tumbling a 25-foot span into the ravine. The pass had frequently been the scene of attacks by the Viet Minh.
- March 17, 1982 – In what has been called "the worst tragedy" in Vietnam's railway history, over 200 people were killed when a train running from Nha Trang to Ho Chi Minh City lost control at speeds of over 100 km/h and derailed near Bàu Cá, Đồng Nai Province, scattering the locomotives and coaches throughout the nearby terrain.
- August 4, 2003 – Fourteen Vietnamese war veterans were killed on their way to visit historical sites when their minibus collided with a southbound train at a crossing in Cam Lộ District, Quảng Trị Province. Twelve people were declared dead at the scene, while two more later died of their injuries.
- March 12, 2005 – 2005 Phú Lộc derailment: An express passenger train on the North–South Railway derailed in central Vietnam, killing 11 people and injuring hundreds, many of which were in a serious condition after the crash. The derailment occurred near the Hai Van Pass, in Phú Lộc District, Thừa Thiên–Huế Province while the train was traveling southbound from Hanoi to Ho Chi Minh City.
- February 8, 2007 – An express train collides with a "passenger car" in Khánh Hòa Province, killing 13 people and injuring 24, most of whom were returning home on the occasion of Tết.
- November 22, 2009 – Nine people were killed when a bus returning from an engagement ceremony collided with a southbound train at a level crossing in Thuong Tin, Hanoi. One set of warning lights at the crossing was out of order, and the other set had collapsed.
- February 6, 2011 – A SE-2 Saigon-Hanoi passenger train collided head-on with 6 vehicles including cars and pick-up trucks at a one-lane rail-road bridge in Biên Hòa, killing 2 people and injured 26. The vehicles and other scooter riding commuters on the bridge were unable to move due to a traffic jam and the crash was blamed on human failure to signal the incoming train to stop.
- March 30, 2011 – Again in Thuong Tin, Hanoi, a minibus carrying 18 people to a wedding collided with northbound cargo train at an ungated level crossing. The crash killed 9 people and left 6 injured, all in the same family.
- March 10, 2015 – The Dien Sanh train crash occurred when a passenger train struck a lorry obstructing the line on a level crossing near Dien Sanh station, Quảng Trị Province, Vietnam. One person was killed and four were seriously injured.

== See also ==
- Rail transport in Vietnam
