= 2005 Phú Lộc derailment =

Vietnamese train crash

- Location within Vietnam

Details
- Date: 12 March 2005; 11:50 AM
- Location: Phú Lộc, Thừa Thiên–Huế
- Coordinates: 16.2°N 108.133°E
- Country: Vietnam
- Line: North–South Railway
- Operator: Vietnam Railways
- Incident type: Derailment
- Cause: Speeding

Statistics
- Trains: 1
- Deaths: 11
- Injured: 200
Route map

The 2005 Phú Lộc derailment was a crash involving an express passenger train that derailed in central Vietnam on 12 March 2005 when it was running on the North–South Railway, killing 11 people and injuring hundreds, many of which were in a serious condition after the crash. The derailment occurred in Phú Lộc District, Thừa Thiên–Huế Province as the train was traveling from Hanoi to Ho Chi Minh City. The crash was described as "the most tragic rail accident in Vietnam in the past 30 years", and "the country's worst-ever rail accident".

== Incident ==
The train was heading from Hanoi to Ho Chi Minh City when eight of the train's 13 cars toppled from the tracks near the Hải Vân mountain pass. The derailment occurred at 11:50 am near Da Ban hamlet, at kilometre 752(+500) of the North–South Railway, approximately 3 km west of Lăng Cô station, Phú Lộc District, Thừa Thiên–Huế Province, and 8 km from the northern section of the Hải Vân Pass. Some 500 passengers and 29 crew members were aboard the train; of these, at least 11 were killed and 200 injured. Six people reportedly died at the scene, while five more died of their injuries after the fact. The Chinese People's Daily reported that 70 people had been "severely injured". The crash blocked traffic along the single-track North-South Railway for 26 hours while rescue and clean-up efforts proceeded.

A probe by the Vietnamese police department found that the train was travelling at a speed of 68 km/h (42 mph) when it derailed, or 20 km/h more than the stipulated speed limit of 40 km/h (25 mph). Witnesses reported that the train was travelling at a high speed at the time of the incident, with one passenger claiming that the train had been "gathering speed" just before the derailment. The train was reportedly 20 minutes behind schedule at the time.

Due to the lack of road access to the site of the derailment, rescuers were forced to reach the site by boat, mobilizing several boats and canoes to transport injured passengers to Route 1A, where they were transported to local hospitals, including Phú Lộc District Hospital, Hue Central Hospital, and Polyclinic Hospital (Bệnh viện đa khoa) in Da Nang.

== See also ==
- Railway accidents in Vietnam
