= Hải Vân Tunnel =

Road tunnel

Hải Vân Tunnel Hầm đường bộ Hải Vân
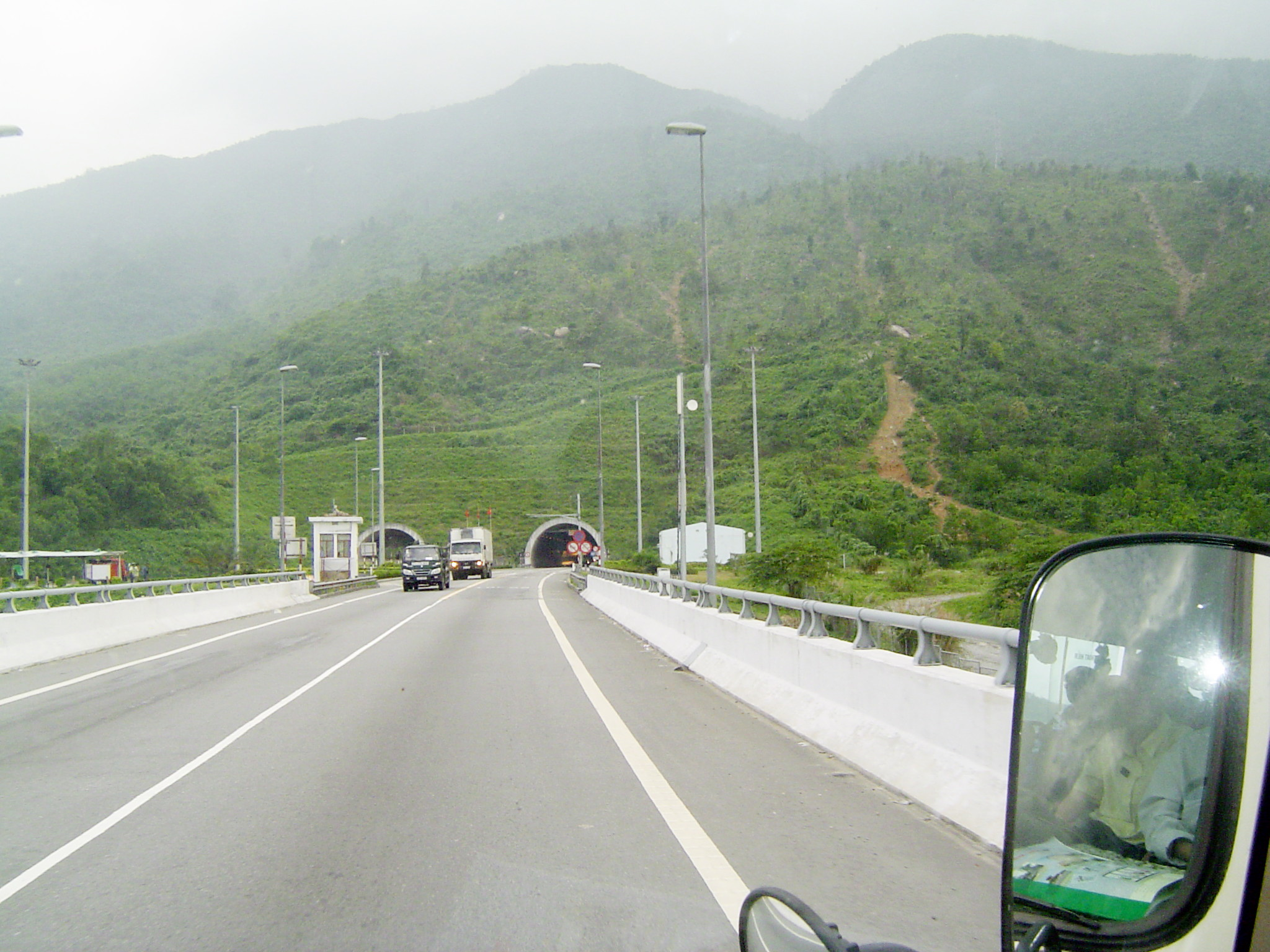
- Hải Vân bridge leads to the Tunnel
- Interactive map of Hải Vân Tunnel; Hầm đường bộ Hải Vân

Overview
- Location: Between Huế and Đà Nẵng
- Coordinates: 16°09′46″N 108°06′27″E
- Status: Operational
- Route: National Route 1 (Vietnam)

Operation
- Work began: 2000 (1st); 2017 (2nd)
- Opened: 2005 (1st); 2021 (2nd)
- Character: 2 tunnels

Technical
- Length: 6,280 m (3.90 mi)
- No. of lanes: 2
- Operating speed: 70 km/h (43.5 mph)
- Tunnel clearance: 7.5 m (24.6 ft)
- Width: 10 m (32.8 ft)

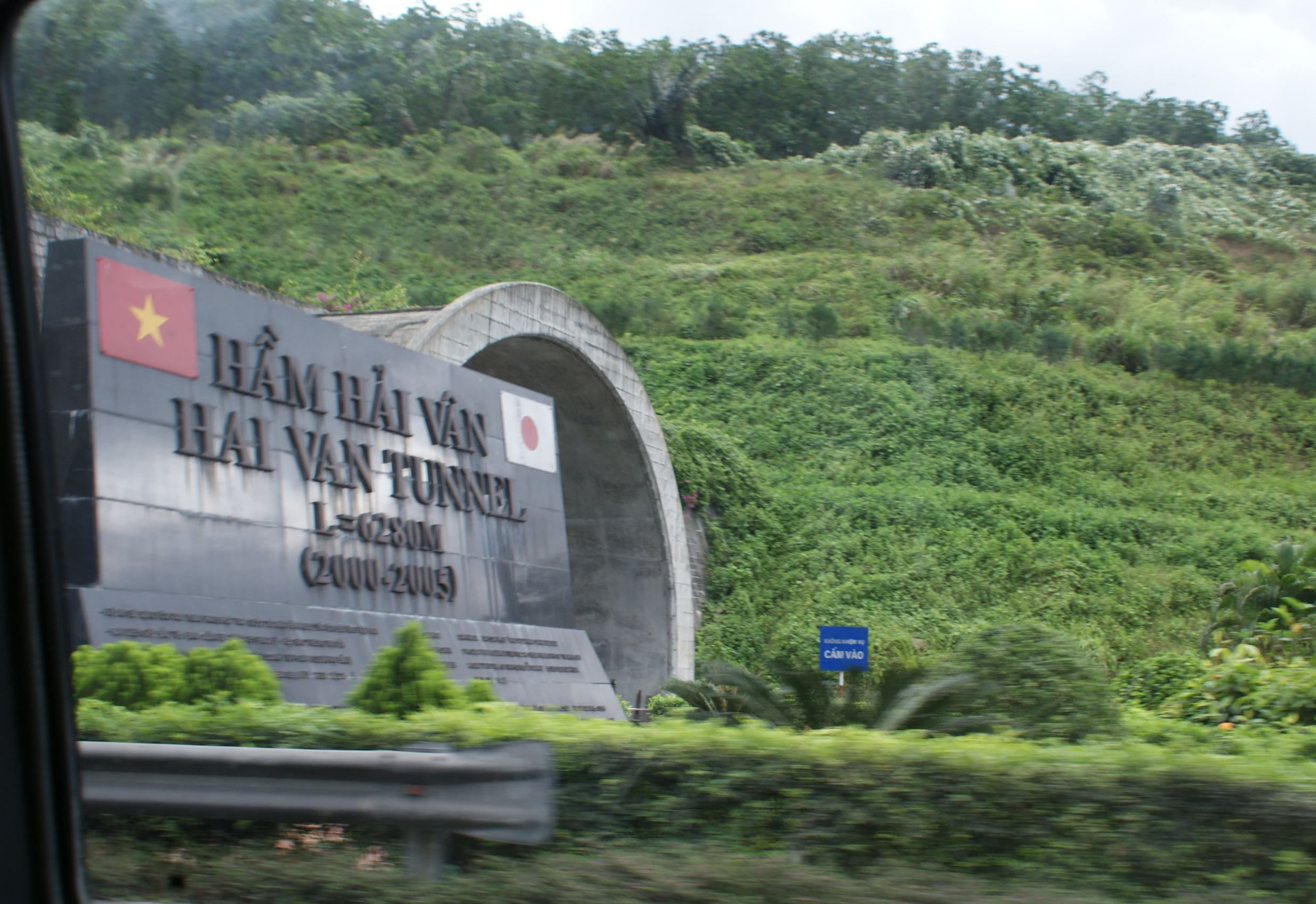
The southern end of the Hải Vân Tunnel

The Hải Vân Tunnel, the second longest tunnel in Southeast Asia (after Singapore's 12.46 km (7.7 mi) long Kallang-Paya Lebar-Marina Central Expressway tunnel) and the longest in Vietnam at 6.28 km (3.90 mi), lies on Highway 1 between the two cities of Da Nang and Huế in central Vietnam.

== History ==
The Hải Vân Pass has long been recognised as a major bottleneck. The concept of a tunnel to bypass the long route over the top had long been sought.

== Planning and design ==
Route planning and design work started in January 1998 by a joint venture between Nippon Koei Company Limited Japan and Louis Berger International Inc., USA with the Vietnamese Transport Engineering Design Incorporated (TEDI) providing consultation on the project.

== Construction ==
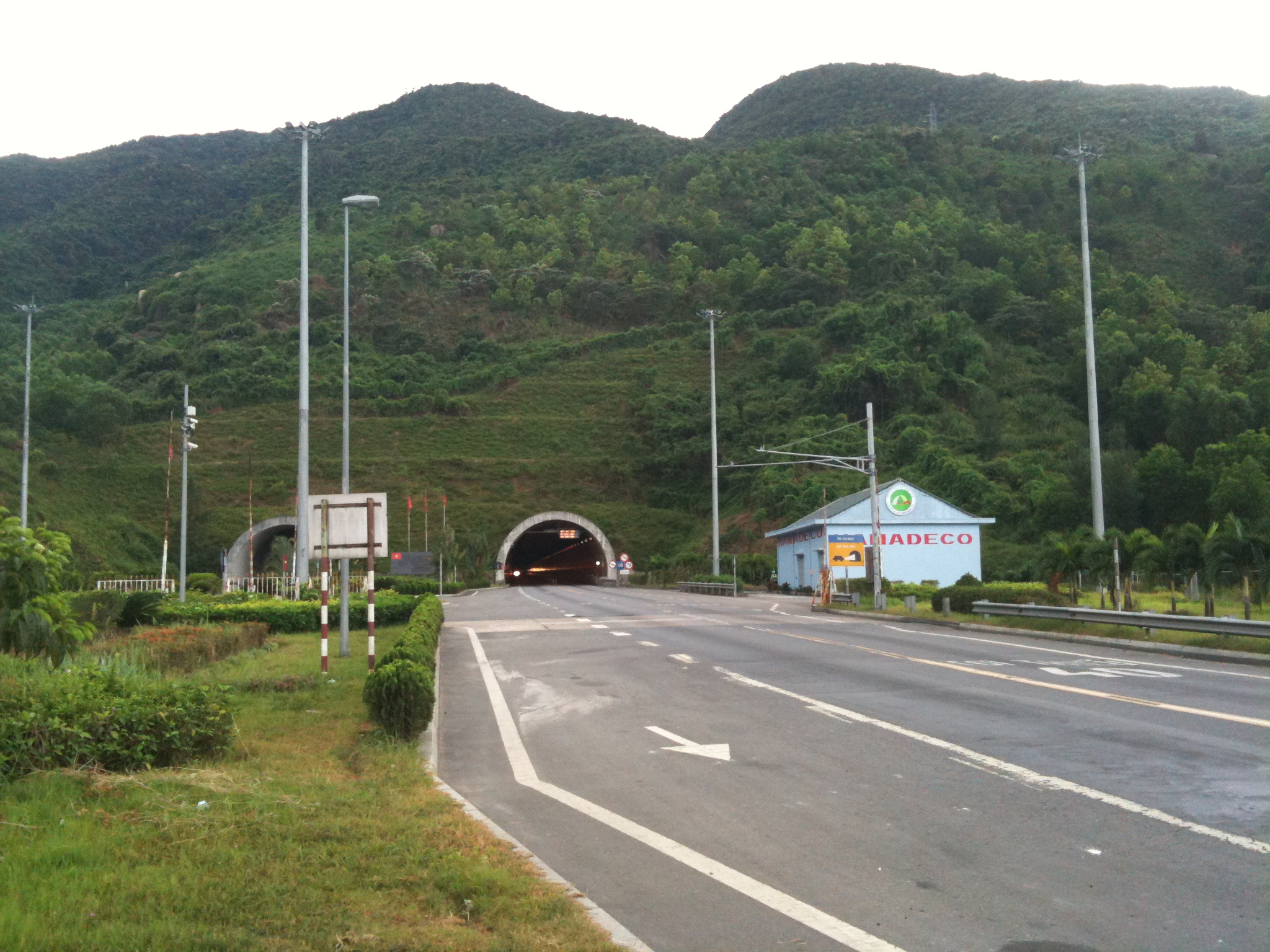
The north end of the Hải Vân 1 Tunnel (right) and Hải Vân 2 Tunnel (left).

The tunnel was split into two segments, a southern and a northern section. The southern section (4 km (2.49 mi)) was constructed by a Vietnam–Japan joint venture between the Japanese Hazama Corporation and their Vietnamese partners, Cienco 6. The 2 km (1.24 mi) northern section was constructed by a joint venture between Korea's Dong Ah construction company and Vietnam's Song Da Construction Corporation.

The tunnel officially opened on June 5, 2005.

The main tunnel is 11.9 m (39.0 ft) wide. A second tunnel running alongside the main tunnel is currently used for maintenance and emergencies but it is planned to expand this at a later date as traffic increases. It is connected to the main tunnel by 15 cross-tunnels. The tunnels have lighting, fire alarms, communication, water supply and treatment, ventilation fans, and radio broadcast systems.

The tunnel subsequently has received an award for quality by the American Construction Management Association.

== Regulations ==
Drivers not only have to follow road traffic law but also have to follow these regulations:

1. Speed and distance.

- a) Max speed: 70 km/h (43.5 mph) (60km/h before 2006)
- b) Minimum speed: 45 km/h (28.0 mph) (40km/h before 2006)
- c) Minimum distance between vehicles on the same lane: 50 meters.

2. Prohibited acts.

- a) Backing and turn around vehicle.
- b) Stopping, parking vehicle.
- c) Leave any soil, rock, garbage and any other material inside the tunnel.
- d) Honking
- e) Turn on priority light
- f) Turn on headlights in high beam mode and any other strong lights.

3. Driver's responsibility.

- a) Turn on headlights in low beam mode.
- b) Turn on FM radio at frequency 106MHz (or at 102.5MHz according to the sign at the tunnel entrance) or AM radio at 702KHz
- c) Observe, follow the signs and traffic lights.

== Operation ==
Currently the single tunnel has one lane of traffic in each direction. As no overtaking is possible this can result in minor delays if motorists are stuck behind slow moving traffic. In May 2021 the toll increased. Vehicles with less than 12 seats, trucks of below two tonnes and buses are charged VND110,000 per trip, while those of 12 to 30 seats and trucks of two to four tonnes have to pay VND160,000 per trip. Motorcycles, cycles and pedestrians are not allowed in the tunnel but a new shuttle service began in November 2006. This shuttle service operates around the clock with a reduced overnight service and a daytime fare of VND25,000 or VND30,000 per motorcycle, VND15,000 per bicycle, and VND10,000 per person.
A small waiting area has been established at each end of the tunnel where visitors can take photographs and watch a documentary about the making of the tunnel.

The tunnel reduces the distance between Đà Nẵng and Huế by 20 km (12 mi) and saves between 30 minutes and an hour on traveling times over the old Hải Vân Pass route.
