= Dunmurry Golf Club =

Golf course in Belfast, Northern Ireland

Coordinates: 54°32′55″N 5°59′11″W

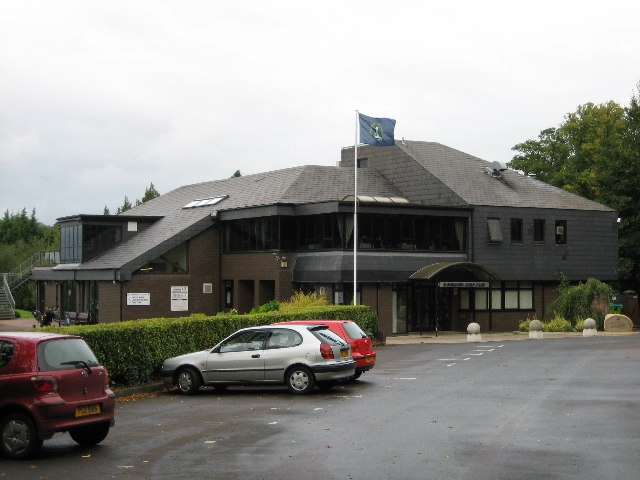
Clubhouse, opened in 1983

Dunmurry Golf Club is located in Dunmurry Lane, south-west Belfast, Northern Ireland. It consists of an 18-hole course with a par of 70.

Founded in 1905, the club was originally located in Upper Dunmurry Lane. The original 9-hole course was designed and laid by G.S. Dunn of Newcastle, County Down, in 1905. The course was extended to 14 holes in 1973 and then to 18 holes in 1977. As a result of road improvements in the area, the club moved to a new course in Dunmurry Lane approximately one mile away from the previous course.

Honourable members include Dame Mary Peters who represented at the Summer Olympic Games for Team GB and for Northern Ireland in the Commonwealth Games winning Gold.

== Scorecards ==
Hole	Name	Yards	Par
1	The Copse	338	4
2	Old Forge	338	4
3	Viewfort	163	3
4	Trossachs	509	5
5	Colinmore	342	4
6	Rathmore	404	4
7	Badger's Hill	139	3
8	The Lake	380	4
9	Fortfield	379	4
Out		2979	35

Hole	Name	Yards	Par						
10	Elms Gap	336	4						
11	Course View	359	4						
12	The Lane	151	3						
13	Fairy Thorn	483	5						
14	Road Hole	264	4						
15	Coach House	341	4						
16	Oak View	171	3						
17	The Hill	296	4						
18	The Limes	343	4						
In		2744	35	Out	2979	35	Total	5723	70
