= Barry Hobson =

Irish cricketer and educator

Personal information
- Full name: Barry Sinton Hobson
- Born: 22 November 1925; Dunmurry, Northern Ireland
- Died: 9 April 2017 (aged 91); Wells, Somerset, England
- Batting: Right-handed
- Bowling: Right-arm medium

Domestic team information
- Years: Team
- 1946: Cambridge University
- 1950–1953: Wiltshire

Career statistics
| Competition | First-class |
|---|---|
| Matches | 7 |
| Runs scored | 50 |
| Batting average | 4.54 |
| 100s/50s | –/– |
| Top score | 16* |
| Balls bowled | 930 |
| Wickets | 10 |
| Bowling average | 46.00 |
| 5 wickets in innings | – |
| 10 wickets in match | – |
| Best bowling | 3/60 |
| Catches/stumpings | 1/– |
- Source: Cricinfo, 28 June 2019

Barry Sinton Hobson TD (22 November 1925 – 9 April 2017) was a first-class cricketer and educator from Northern Ireland.

Hobson was born at the Belfast suburb of Dunmurry into a family of Quaker linen manufacturers. When he was aged 4, his family moved to Highcliffe in southern England in the hope that the climate would prove beneficial to the health of his asthmatic elder brother. He was educated at Taunton School. While at Taunton, Hobson suffered from polio which temporarily blinded him and caused paralysis in his arm and leg. However, he recovered well enough to be able to play for and captain the school cricket team. From Taunton he studied history at St Catharine's College, Cambridge. While at Cambridge, he played first-class cricket for Cambridge University in 1946, making seven appearances. In his seven matches, Hobson scored 50 runs with a high score of 16 not out, while with the ball he took 10 wickets with best figures of 3 for 60. He played minor counties cricket for Wiltshire between 1950–53, making seven appearances in the Minor Counties Championship.

After graduating he took up various teaching posts. He was appointed by Jack Meyer as the master in charge of cricket at Millfield School in 1956. He taught at the school for the next 35 years, becoming a senior housemaster and rugby coach. Outside of his teaching career, Hobson reached the rank of major in the Territorial Army, for which he decorated with the Territorial Decoration. He died in April 2017 at Wells, Somerset. He was survived by his wife, Rosemary, whom he had married in 1954. The couple had three children, with one predeceasing him.
