= Dunmurry train bombing =

1980 IRA attack in Northern Ireland

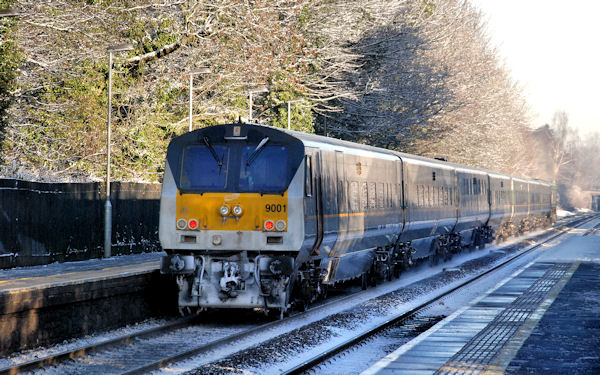
- The Dunmurry Station

Details
- Date: 17 January 1980
- Location: Dunmurry, near Belfast
- Coordinates: 54°33′39.2″N 5°59′35.2″W
- Country: Northern Ireland
- Line: Belfast–Dublin railway line
- Cause: Premature detonation of IRA bomb

Statistics
- Trains: 1
- Passengers: Unknown
- Deaths: 3
- Injured: 5

The Dunmurry train bombing was a premature detonation of a Provisional Irish Republican Army (IRA) incendiary bomb aboard a Ballymena to Belfast passenger train service on 17 January 1980.

The blast engulfed a carriage of the train in flames, killing three and injuring five others. One of the dead and the most seriously injured survivors were volunteers of the IRA. After the blast, the organisation issued a statement acknowledging responsibility, apologising to those who were harmed and stated that it was 'grave and distressing' but an 'accident' caused by the 'war situation'.

== The explosion ==
The train was a Northern Ireland Railways afternoon service carrying passengers between Ballymena railway station and Belfast Central railway station. The train was largely empty as it left Dunmurry railway station and entered the outskirts of Belfast, crossing under the M1 motorway on its way to Finaghy railway station shortly before 4.55 p.m., when a large fireball erupted in the rear carriage, bringing the train to a standstill and forcing panicked passengers to evacuate urgently as the smoke and flames spread along the train. The survivors then moved down the track in single file to safety whilst emergency services fought the blaze. After several hours and combined efforts from fire, police and military services the blaze was contained. One fireman was treated for minor injuries. The two damaged carriages were transported to Queen's Quay in Belfast for forensic examination and were subsequently rebuilt, with one remaining in service until 2006 and the other until 2012.

Of the four persons occupying the carriage, three were killed with burns so severe that it was not possible to identify them by conventional means. Rail chief Roy Beattie described the human remains as "three heaps of ashes". The fourth, later identified as Patrick Joseph Flynn, was an IRA member and one of the men transporting the bombs. He suffered very serious burns to his face, torso and legs, and was reported to be close to death upon arrival at the hospital. Of the dead, two were eventually named as 17-year-old Protestant student Mark Cochrane from Finaghy and the other a 35-year-old Belfast-based accountant and recent immigrant from Lagos, Nigeria, Max Olorunda, who had been visiting a client in Ballymena. He left a wife Gabrielle, a Catholic nurse originally from Strabane, and three daughters; the youngest Jayne, is an author and a cross-community worker. Aged two at the time of the bombing, she has written a book about the aftermath of her father's death. Max Olorunda was the first African civilian and only Nigerian to have been killed in the Troubles. The identity of the third was harder to ascertain, but it was eventually confirmed by the IRA by their statement that he was 26-year-old IRA member Kevin Delaney, father of one with a pregnant wife. In addition to the fireman, four people were injured, including Flynn, two teenagers treated for minor injuries and an older man who had suffered much more serious burns.

Further bomb alerts were issued across the region and two similar devices discovered on trains, at York Road railway station in Belfast and at Greenisland railway station. Both were removed safely and control detonated. The devices were simple incendiary bombs similar to that which exploded south of Befast, consisting of a 5lb block of explosives attached to a petrol can with a simple time device intended to delay the explosion until the train was empty that evening. Later testimony indicated that Delaney had armed the first of two bombs and placed it beside him as he picked up the second one. As he armed this device, the first bomb suddenly detonated for reasons that remain unknown. Delaney was killed instantly and his accomplice, Patrick Joseph Flynn, was forced to leap from the train in flames. Flynn was guarded by police in hospital and arrested once his wounds had healed sufficiently.

== Reactions ==
The IRA released a lengthy statement about the event, terming it a 'bombing tragedy', blaming the Royal Ulster Constabulary for their 'sickening and hypocritical ... collective activity of collaboration with the British forces' and stating:

The explosion occurred prematurely and the intended target was not the civilians travelling on the train. We always take the most stringent precautions to ensure the safety of all civilians in the vicinity of a military or commercial bombing operation. The bombing mission on Thursday night was not an exception to this principle. Unfortunately the unexpected is not something we can predict or prevent in the war situation this country is in, the consequences of the unexpected are often grave and distressing, as Thursday night's accident shows.
...
Our sorrow at losing a young married man, Kevin Delaney is heightened by the additional deaths of Mr. Olorunda and Mark Cochrane. To all their bereaved families we offer our dearest and heartfelt sympathy.

In Britain, Conservative MP Winston Churchill called for the death penalty to be reinstated for terrorists as a result of this incident. The RUC responded to the IRA's announcement with a short statement stating that:

The fact is that innocent people are dead and the Provisional IRA are responsible, as they have been on hundreds of other occasions. Once again they stand condemned in the eyes of the civilised world.

This was not the first occasion in which an IRA bomb on a train killed or wounded someone. On 12 October 1978, 55-year-old Letitia McCrory was killed by an IRA bomb explosion on the Belfast-Dublin line near Belfast Central station. The CAIN database indicates that in the 1978 explosion, an inadequate warning was given thus not allowing authorities time to evacuate the train completely before the device detonated.

== Prosecution ==
24-year-old Patrick Flynn was tried at Belfast Crown Court for double manslaughter and possession of explosives after his recovery from his injuries. Flynn was severely disfigured and badly scarred from the extensive burns the incendiary device had inflicted upon him. The judge was asked and agreed to take this into account for sentencing after reviewing the evidence and finding Flynn guilty due to his proximity to the explosion, his known IRA affiliation and the discovery of telephone numbers for The Samaritans and Belfast Central station in his jacket, to be used to telephone bomb warnings. Mr Justice Kelly sentenced Flynn to ten years prison for each manslaughter as well as seven years for the explosives offences, to be served concurrently. He concluded by summing up with the words:

I am satisfied beyond reasonable doubt you were one of the bombers. I am satisfied you and your associates did not intend to kill. Nevertheless, the explosion and fire caused the death of three people in most horrific circumstances. In sentencing you I am conscious you have suffered severe burns and scars, for the rest of your life which will be a grim reminder to you of the events of that day.

== Sources ==
- "The legacy of a Belfast childhood". The IrishWorld. 18 December 2013. Archived from the original on 16 May 2015.
- Calder, Tina (15 April 2014). "IRA victim's daughter to stand for election as NI21 councillor". News Letter.
- "Daughter of Nigerian IRA victim writes 'Legacy' book". News Letter. 20 September 2013.
- Malcolm, Bob (26 September 2013). "One woman's story of loss, grief and racism in Belfast". Belfast Telegraph.
- Malcolm, Bob (26 September 2013). "Jayne's story is one of death, grief and surviving prejudice on Belfast's mean streets". Belfast Telegraph.
- "Jayne Olorunda (video)". BBC News. 11 February 2009.
- "Alison Olorunda (video)". BBC News. 11 February 2009.

== See also ==
- List of terrorist incidents involving railway systems
