= 2003 Stavropol train bombing =

Terrorist attack on commuter train, Russia

- Location of Stavropol Krai in Russia
- Location: Yessentuki, Stavropol Krai, Russia
- Date: December 5, 2003
- Target: Stavropol Krai regional train civilians
- Attack type: suicide bombing
- Deaths: 46-
- Injuries: 170+
- Perpetrator: Mujahideen in Chechnya
- Motive: Anti-Russian

The 2003 Stavropol train bombing was a terrorist attack that occurred on 5 December 2003, in Yessentuki, Stavropol Krai, Russia, when an explosion on a commuter train killed at least 46 people and injured over 170 more.

A regional electric train in Stavropol Krai was commuting from Kislovodsk to Mineralnye Vody in Stavropol Krai, when a suicide bomber armed with explosives equivalent to an estimated 7 kilograms (15 pounds) worth of TNT detonated as the train departed from the station in Yessentuki.

Responsibility for the attack was immediately pointed at Chechen terrorists, who had committed previous attacks on trains on the line shortly before, including one on September 3, 2003, killing 7 and injuring more than 80. Ibragim Israpilov, a former local official from Chechnya, was convicted in 2004 for organizing the September blast and sentenced to 20 years of imprisonment. He is sometimes erroneously reported as being behind the December 5 bombing. Another series of suicide bombings and other terrorist attacks in and around Chechnya and Moscow also occurred in 2003, which added to suspicion.

As of February 2023, there were no arrests or convictions for the Yessentuki attack.

== See also ==
- List of terrorist incidents involving railway systems
