= Hải Vân Pass =

Mountain pass in Vietnam

- Đèo Hải Vân
- Location within Vietnam

Location
- Location: Vietnam
- Range: Annamite Range
- Coordinates: 16°12′N 108°8′E

The Hải Vân Pass (Vietnamese: Đèo Hải Vân, IPA: [ɗɛ̂w ha᷉ːj vən], 'ocean cloud pass'), is an approximately 21-kilometre (13 mi) long mountain pass on National Route 1 in Vietnam. It traverses a spur of the larger Annamite Range that juts into the South China Sea on the border of Đà Nẵng and Huế, near Bạch Mã National Park. Its name refers to the mists that rise from the sea, reducing visibility. Historically, the pass was a physical division between the kingdoms of Champa and Đại Việt from 1306 until Vietnamese invasion in 1471.

The twisting road on the pass has long been a challenge for drivers traveling between the cities of Huế and Đà Nẵng. Since the completion of Hải Vân Tunnel, traffic flow and safety have improved. The pass has been the scene of at least two of Vietnam's most serious rail accidents, and at least one air crash.

== Overview ==
The Hải Vân Pass crosses over a spur of the Trường Sơn (Annamite Range) that emerges from the west and juts into the South China Sea, forming the Hải Vân Peninsula and the adjoining Son Tra Island. The pass, which once formed the boundary between the kingdoms of Đại Việt and Champa in 1306, also forms a boundary between the climates of northern and southern Vietnam, sheltering the city of Da Nang from the "Chinese winds" that blow in from the northwest. During the winter months (November–March), for instance, weather on the north side of the pass might be wet and cold, while the south side might be warm and dry.

The pass is renowned for its scenic beauty. Presenter Jeremy Clarkson, then host of the BBC motoring programme Top Gear, featured the pass during the show's 2008 Vietnam Special, calling the road "a deserted ribbon of perfection—one of the best coast roads in the world."

== History ==
Hải Vân Pass has been of major strategic importance in the history of Vietnam, and for a long time represented a major barrier to any land army that attempted to move between the northern and central regions of the country.

During the 1st century A.D., the Chinese general Ma Yuan (Mã Viện), after pacifying northern Vietnam, advanced south and established the southern border of the Hán empire by setting up columns of bronze, possibly at Hải Vân. Ma Yuan also left behind some Chinese military families to hold the frontier. When the Han empire collapsed at the end of the 2nd century, the local kingdom of Lâm Ấp (Linyi), the predecessor to the medieval polity of Champa, was created by a petty frontier bureaucrat of the Han administration, probably in the area of modern Huế somewhat to the north.

== Transport ==
The pass is crossed by two main transport routes: Vietnam's main north–south highway, National Route 1, and the North–South Railway. The road uses the Hải Vân Tunnel—the longest tunnel in Southeast Asia—while the railway hugs the coastline, passing through a series of tunnels along the way.

The old National Route 1 crosses over the mountain more or less directly, climbing to an elevation of 496 m (1,627 ft) and passing south of the 1,172 m (3,845 ft) high Ai Van Son peak. Travel time on it can be up to an hour longer. In Top Gear series 12's Vietnam Special, Jeremy Clarkson called this route "one of the best coast roads in the world."

=== Accidents ===
Besides its beauty, the pass is also renowned for its difficulty. A poem by Nguyễn Phúc Chu (1675–1725) describes Hải Vân as "the most dangerous mountain in Vietnam" (Vietnamese: Việt Nam hiểm ải thử sơn điên). Visibility on the pass is often reduced by the eponymous mists that rise from the sea. Along with the road's winding route through the pass, this posed a serious challenge for drivers before the construction of the Hải Vân Tunnel. The Hai Van Pass has also been the scene of at least two of Vietnam's most serious rail accidents, and at least one air crash.

- 24 June 1953 – 1953 Col des Nuages derailment: "About 100 or more" were killed when two locomotives and 18 cars of a passenger train plunged 50 feet through a sabotaged viaduct in the Col des Nuages, now known as the Hai Van Pass. Officials said that a strong explosive charge went off just as the train arrived at the viaduct, tumbling a 25-foot span into the ravine. The pass had frequently been the scene of attacks by the Viet Minh.
- 28 December 1969 - a United States Marine Corps CH-46 helicopter #153379 from Marine Medium Helicopter Squadron 364, crashed in Hai Van pass. The aircraft had experienced radio problems while flying at night in instrument conditions. All 10 crew and passengers were killed in the crash. A portion of the tail pylon, showing the squadron emblem is on display at the National Museum of the Marine Corps.
- 12 March 2005 – 2005 Phú Lộc derailment: An express passenger train on the North–South Railway derailed north of the Pass, in Phú Lộc District, Thừa Thiên–Huế Province, killing 11 people and injuring hundreds, many seriously. The accident occurred while the train was travelling southbound from Hanoi to Ho Chi Minh City.
- 2026 – Vingroup's project on the coast at the foot of Hải Vân Pass has drawn controversy over the destructions of natural vegetation and concerns about its cultural and environmental impact.

== Gallery ==
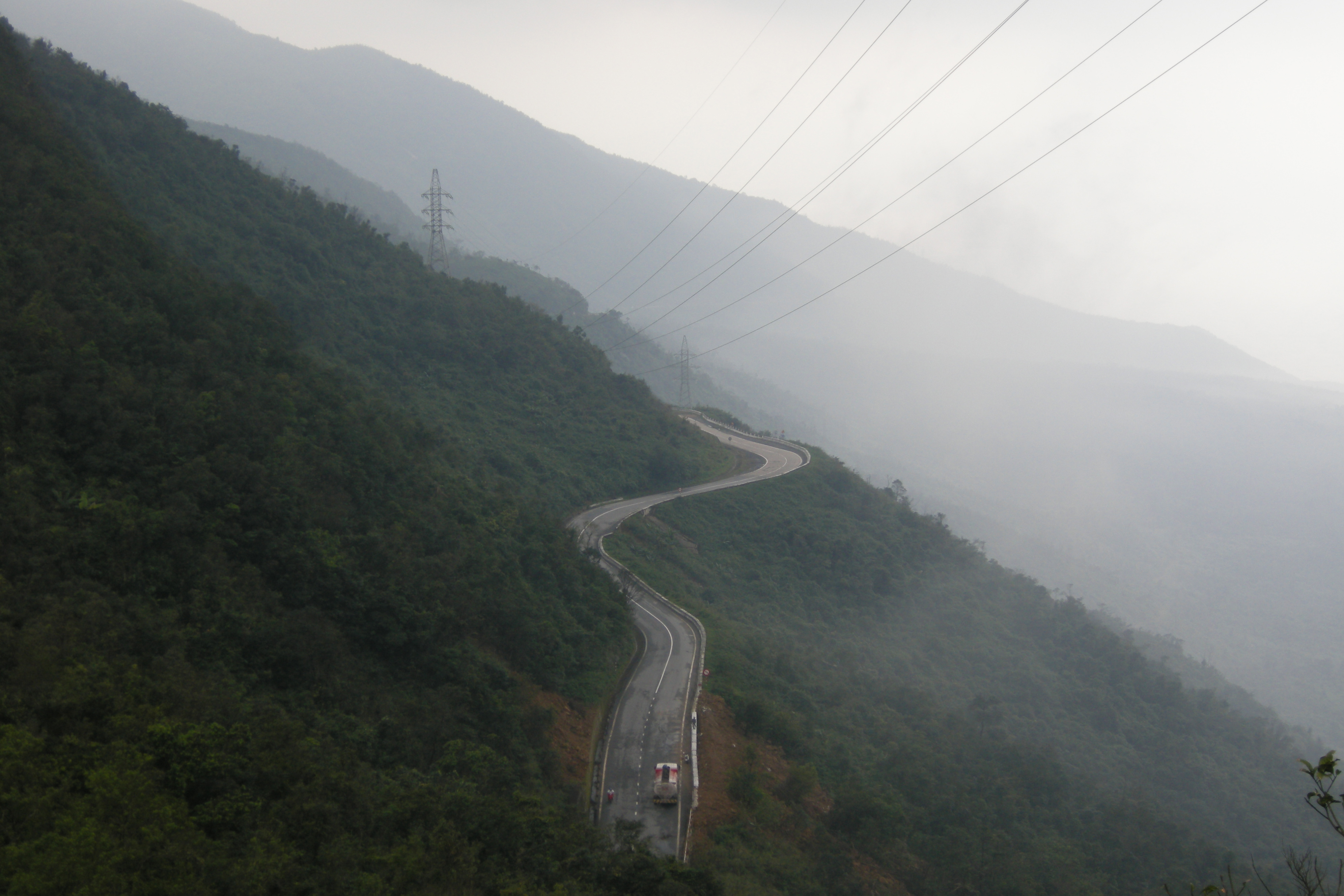
View northwards

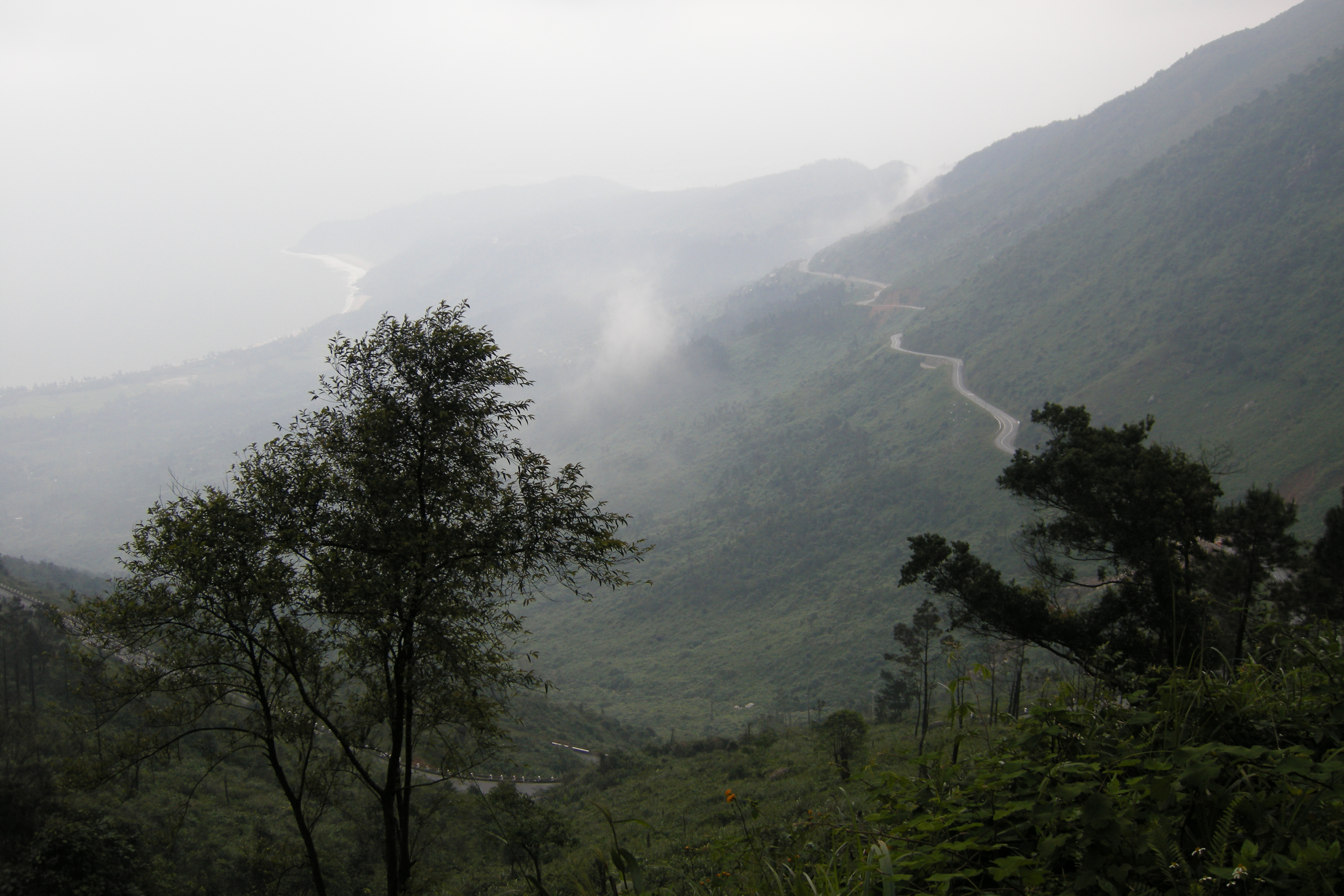
View southwards

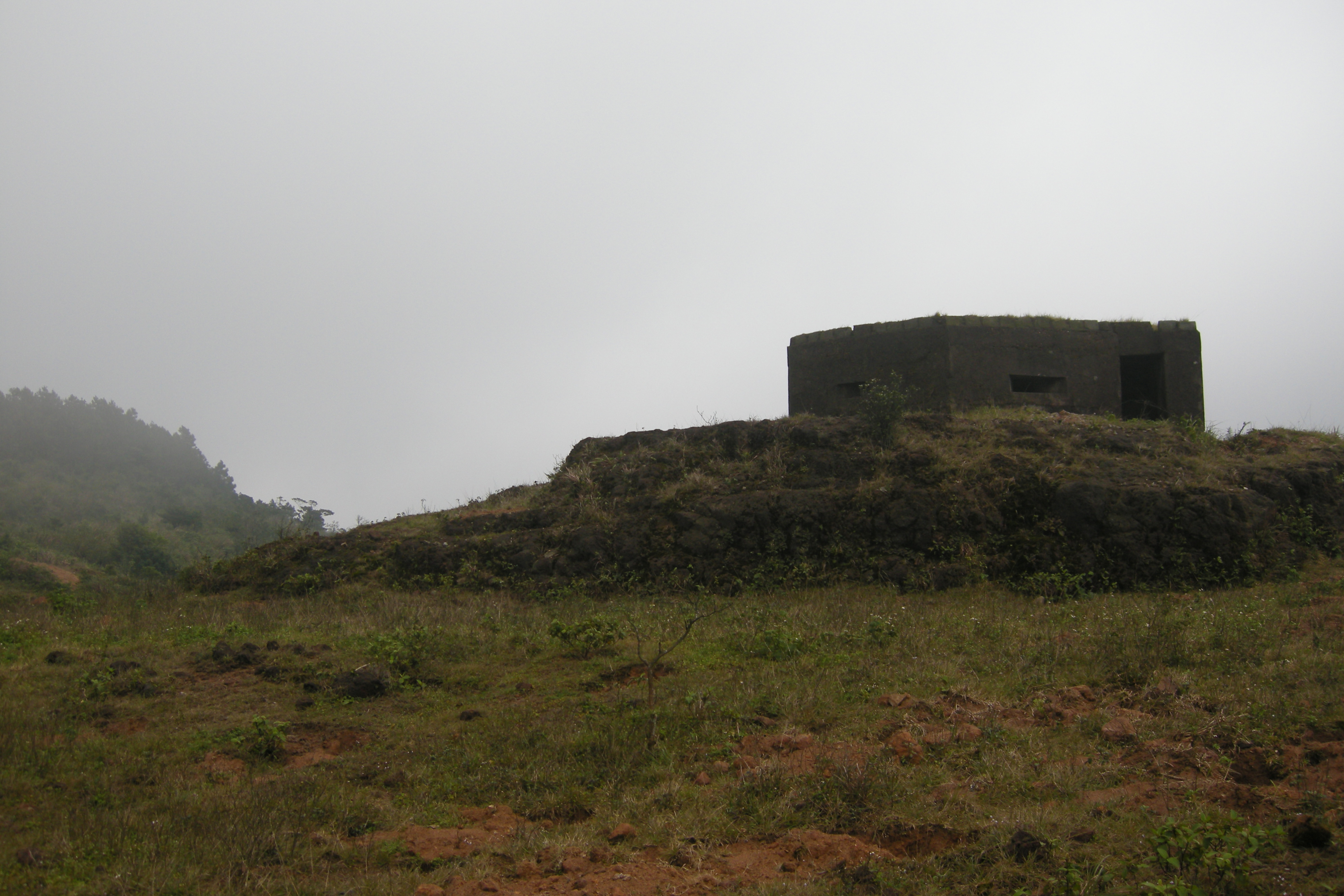
Military bunkers at the pass

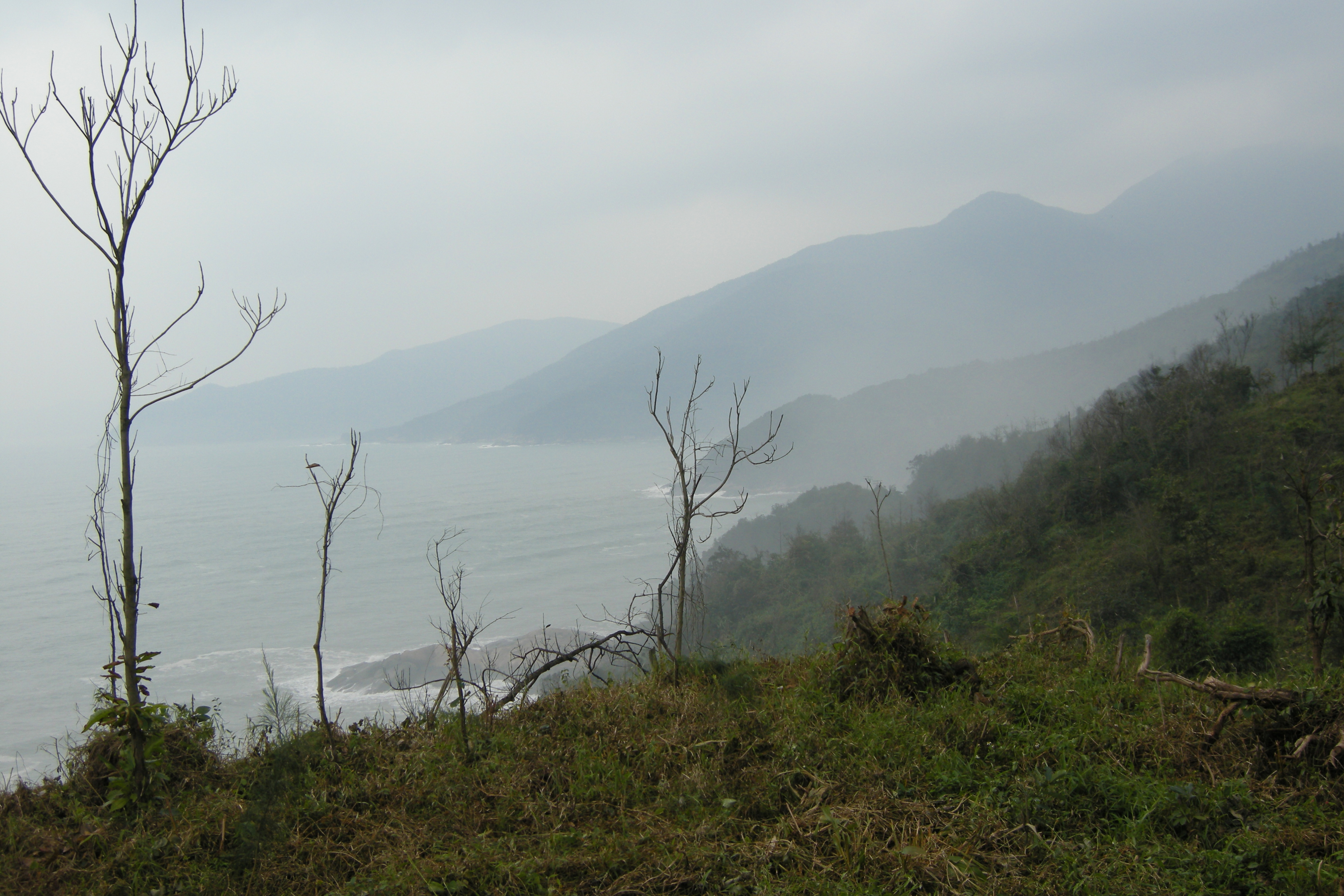
Panoramic view of South China Sea coastline

== See also ==
- Hải Vân Tunnel
- Annamite Range
- Ngang Pass
