= 1947 Amritsar train massacre =

1947 massacre in Amritsar, India

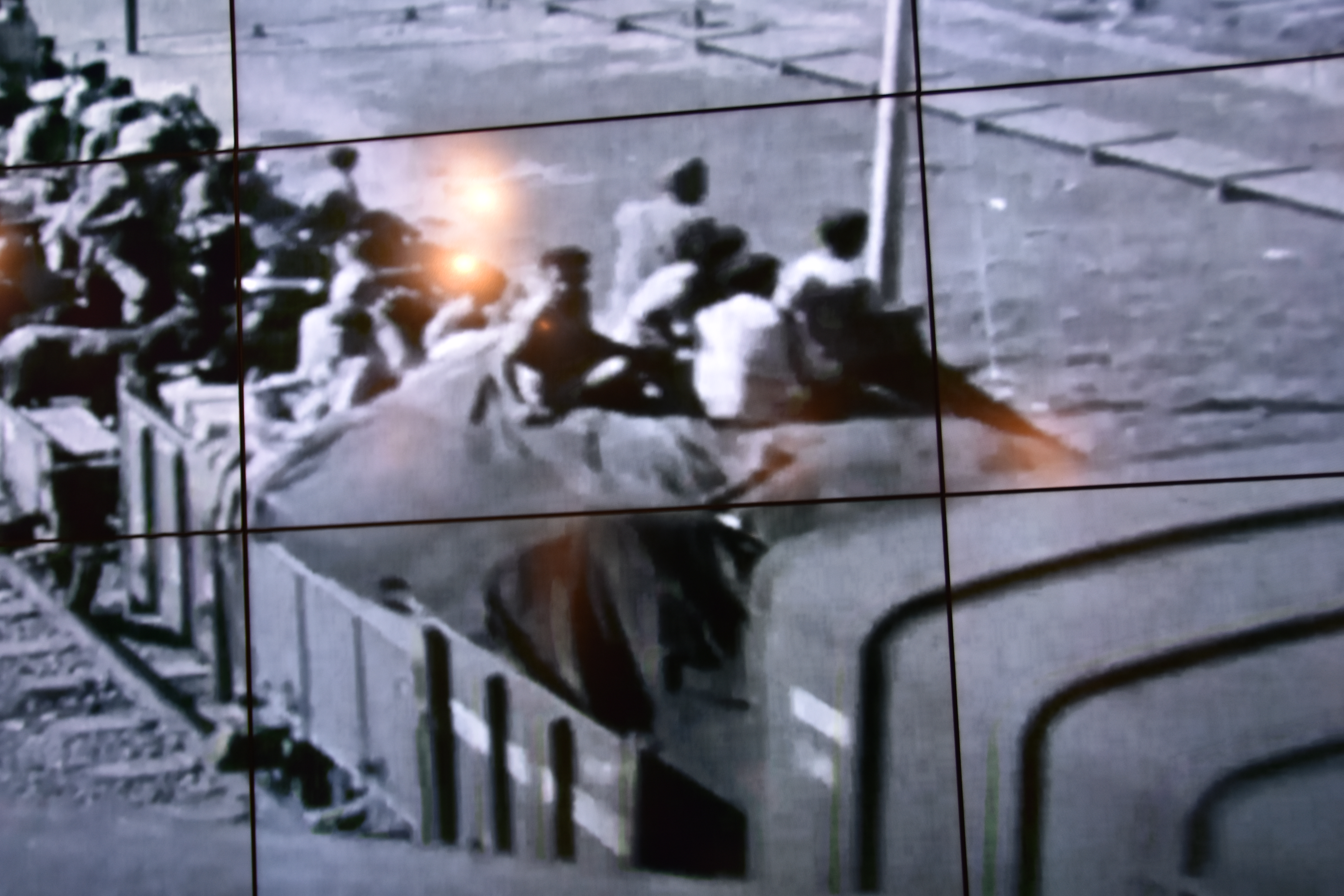
- A train full of refugees travelling between India and Pakistan in 1947.
- Location: Amritsar
- Date: 22 September 1947
- Deaths: ~3,000
- Injuries: ~1,000
- Victim: Muslim refugees
- Perpetrator: Sikh Jathas
- Motive: Massacre

An attack on a railway train carrying Muslim refugees during the Partition of India was carried out at Amritsar in Indian Punjab on 22 September 1947. Three thousand Muslim refugees were killed and a further one thousand wounded. Only one hundred passengers remained uninjured. These murders demonstrated that railway carriages provided very little protection from physical assault. After several such attacks on Muslim refugees by Sikhs armed with rifles, swords, and spears, the Government of Pakistan stopped all trains from the Indian Punjab to the Pakistani Punjab at the end of September 1947. The Sikh Jathas led the attacks for ethnically cleansing the Eastern Punjab of its Muslim population. Earlier in September, they had massacred 1,000 Muslim refugees on a Pakistan-bound train near Khalsa College, Amritsar. The violence was the most pronounced in the Indian East Punjab. Sir Francis Mudie who had become governor of the West Punjab in mid-August 1947, noted that a quick succession of attacks on refugee trains headed west to the border from Amritsar and Jullundur districts in East Punjab, India, between 21 and 23 September 1947 included one on a train aboard which every occupant was killed.

== Massacre ==
On Monday, 22 September 1947, a train was leaving 30 miles east from Amritsar and was attacked by Sikhs. This attack was repulsed. Trains carrying Sikh troops did pass by during the attack, but they did not intervene. However, when the same train arrived at Amritsar, crowds of armed Sikh people opened fire at it from both sides of the track. Hindu Jats, the train's escorts, were ordered by the commanding British officer to shoot at the attackers but they deliberately missed the attackers. The commanding officer of the train was left alone to fend for the train. He reportedly shot back at the raiders with a machine gun until it ran out of ammunition. He was killed soon after, reportedly by his own men. Men, women, and children were attacked by Sikhs who swept through the train. The weapons used by the Sikhs during the three hour attack included swords, spears and rifles. The next day, the train was returned to its platform.

== Effects ==
The West Punjab Government announced other attacks that happened during the 1947 Partition of India. This included the attack of a refugee train in Kamoke carrying Sikh-Hindu passengers around 25 miles west of Lahore on Wednesday, 24 September. This attack was responsible for a further 340 deaths of both Sikhs and Hindus and wounded a further 250. Following the massacre the West Punjab Government announced a ban on refugee convoys from West Punjab.

Meetings within the Indian cabinet to stop further attacks were called the next day, as reported by the Associated Press of Great Britain. Military spokesmen reported on the mounting tensions in the Punjab and the serious attacks on refugee trains and convoys.
