= Dunmurry =

Suburban town in Northern Ireland

Coordinates: 54.550°N 6.005°W

Dunmurry: Irish: Dún Muirígh
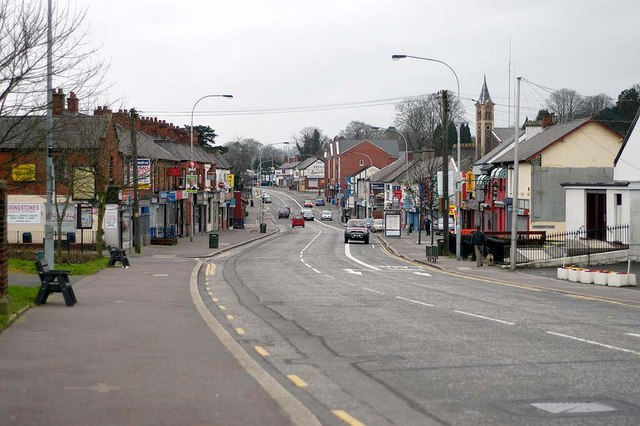

- Location within Northern Ireland
- Irish grid reference: J2968
- District: Belfast City Council
- County: County Antrim
- Country: Northern Ireland
- Sovereign state: United Kingdom
- Post town: Belfast
- Postcode district: BT17
- Dialling code: 028
- UK Parliament: Belfast West
- NI Assembly: Belfast West

Dunmurry (/dʌnˈmʌri/; from Irish Dún Muirígh 'Murry's fort') is a suburban town and townland between Belfast and Lisburn, Northern Ireland. It is 4 1/2 miles (7 km) south-west of Belfast city centre. Dunmurry is in the Collin electoral ward for the local government district of Belfast City Council.

== History ==
Dunmurry comes from Irish Dún Muirígh 'Muiríoch's fort'. This could refer to Muiredach mac Eochada, the Dál Fiatach king of Ulaid, whose son Matudán gave his name to Benn Matudáin, Cavehill. There are remains of an earthen ringfort in the Oakvale area. The Anglo-Normans conquered the area in the late 12th century and built a motte on the site. Its remains are on the site of the former Dunmurry House, near the old ringfort.

Until the end of the 18th century, Dunmurry was largely an agricultural area dominated by wealthy landowners. In 1817, work began on a new road from Belfast to Dublin through Finaghy and Dunmurry. This replaced the old turnpike road through Upper Malone and Drumbeg to Lambeg, which was linked to the town by Dunmurry Lane.

Throughout the 19th century, Dunmurry became known as one of the many 'linen villages' that were spread across Ulster as many of the local factories and mills were promoted by local entrepreneurs. It remained very much a village until the late 1920s, when developers became keen to seize the greenfield sites for overspill housing and for industry - a phenomenon which became particularly evident after the Second World War. The largest expansion of the village in this era came with the advent of the Housing Trust, who, in response to a 1951 order for 1500 units of social housing to be built between Belfast and Lisburn, purchased a large amount of land at Suffolk and former demesne land at Seymour Hill and Conway. One third of these housing units were reserved for residents of Lisburn.

The deadliest incident in Dunmurry during the Troubles was the Dunmurry train bombing on 17 January 1980. A Provisional Irish Republican Army (IRA) bomb exploded prematurely on a train, killing two civilians and an IRA member.

== Politics ==
Politically, Dunmurry falls into the Collin district electoral area (DEA) of Belfast City Council. This is composed of the wards of Dunmurry, Seymour Hill, Derriaghy, Colin Glen, Kilwee, Poleglass, Twinbrook and Lagmore. The Collin DEA generally elects nationalist and left-leaning representatives.

From 1 April 2015, Dunmurry transferred to Belfast City Council under local government reforms.

In 2008, it was recorded in statute that the Dunmurry ward would transfer in its entirety from Lagan Valley to Belfast West. Furthermore, it was decided that the section of the Derriaghy wards which lay to the north of the Derriaghy and Lagmore townland boundary would also transfer to Belfast West.

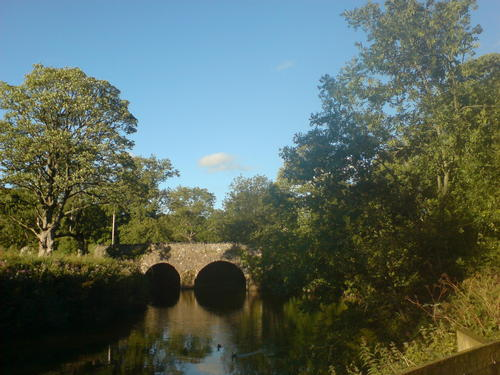
Drumbeg Bridge, Dunmurry

The Member of Parliament for the constituency in which most of Dunmurry lies is Paul Maskey, Sinn Féin MP for Belfast West.

== Amenities ==
Backed by the Colin Mountain, with its Colin Glen, Dunmurry is flanked by the River Lagan which is now canalised. Surrounding Dunmurry's housing estates are open landscapes which include a golf course, the Antrim Hills, Moss Side and the Lagan Valley. There are also extensive playing fields in and around Dunmurry.

Dunmurry Primary School opened in 1930. In an inspection by the Education and Training Inspectorate in November 2011, it was rated 'outstanding' - the highest rating attainable. The school also has a nursery unit which opened in September 2004.

Dunmurry was home to Dunmurry High School (established in 1968 to teach the children's age range - 11 to 16) which closed in 2011. Other schools in the area include Rathmore Grammar School and the Belfast Bible College. The latter is one of five Queen's University constituent colleges recognised to teach undergraduate and postgraduate (certificate, diploma and part-time) courses in Theology.

Dunmurry was the location of the DeLorean Motor Company factory where the DeLorean sports car was manufactured from 1981 until 1982. About 9,000 DeLoreans were made before production ended in 1982, and as of 2006, 6,500 are estimated to still exist.

== Sport ==
Association football clubs in the area include Dunmurry Recreation F.C. (commonly known as Dunmurry Rec), Dunmurry Young Men F.C. and Iveagh United F.C.. The local Gaelic Athletic Association (GAA) club is Eire Og Derriaghy.

Dunmurry Golf Club is also located in the area. Originally located in Upper Dunmurry Lane, the course was designed and laid by G.S. Dunn of Newcastle, County Down, in 1805. The course was extended to 14 holes in 1973 and then to 18 holes in 1977. After road improvements were carried out in the area, the club moved to a new course in Dunmurry Lane, approximately 1 mile away from the previous course. The original course is now a 9-hole course and is home to the Colin Valley Golf Club.

Dunmurry is also the home of Dunmurry Cricket Club who play in the Northern Cricket Union's NCU Senior League. The cricket club, which was formed in the 1940s, has won three NCU Junior Cups. This is represented in the club badge by three stars and the arch in the badge represents one of the many bridges in Dunmurry.

== Transport ==
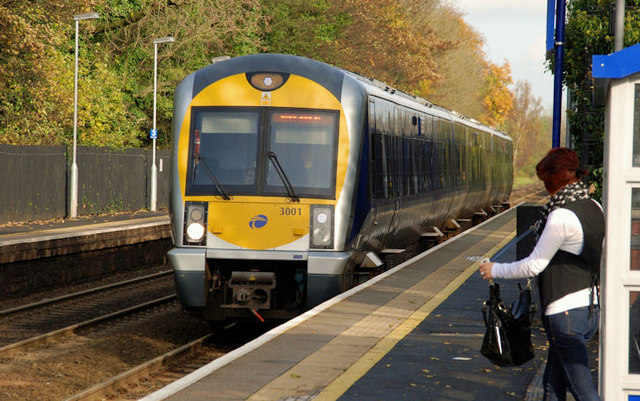
Dunmurry railway station.

Dunmurry railway station, located on the main Belfast–Dublin railway line, opened on 12 August 1839. The local train service offers transport to Belfast, Lisburn, Portadown, Newry and Bangor. Dunmurry village is also regularly serviced by the Metro services: 9A to Conway via Lisburn Road & Finaghy Conway (River Road) and 9C to Conway via Lisburn Road, Balmoral & Finaghy, departing from Donegall Square East, in Central Belfast. Dunmurry Village is also serviced by Translink Ulsterbus Services to Lisburn, Crumlin, Antrim, Craigavon, Portadown, Newry and Armagh.

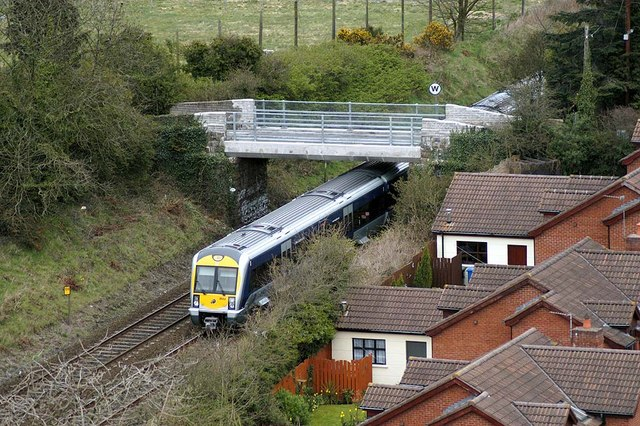
The Belfast Suburban Rail network.

The M1 motorway passes through Dunmurry, at Junction 3 (Black's Road) providing a fast route to and from central Belfast.

== Notable people ==
- Bobby Sands (1954–1981), Irish revolutionary, hunger striker and Fermanagh/South Tyrone MP
- Barry Hobson (1925–2017), cricketer and educator
- Catherine McGuinness (b.1934), judge of the Irish Supreme Court
