= Oslo Central Station bombing =

1982 bombing in Norway

Coordinates: 59°54′41″N 10°45′07″E

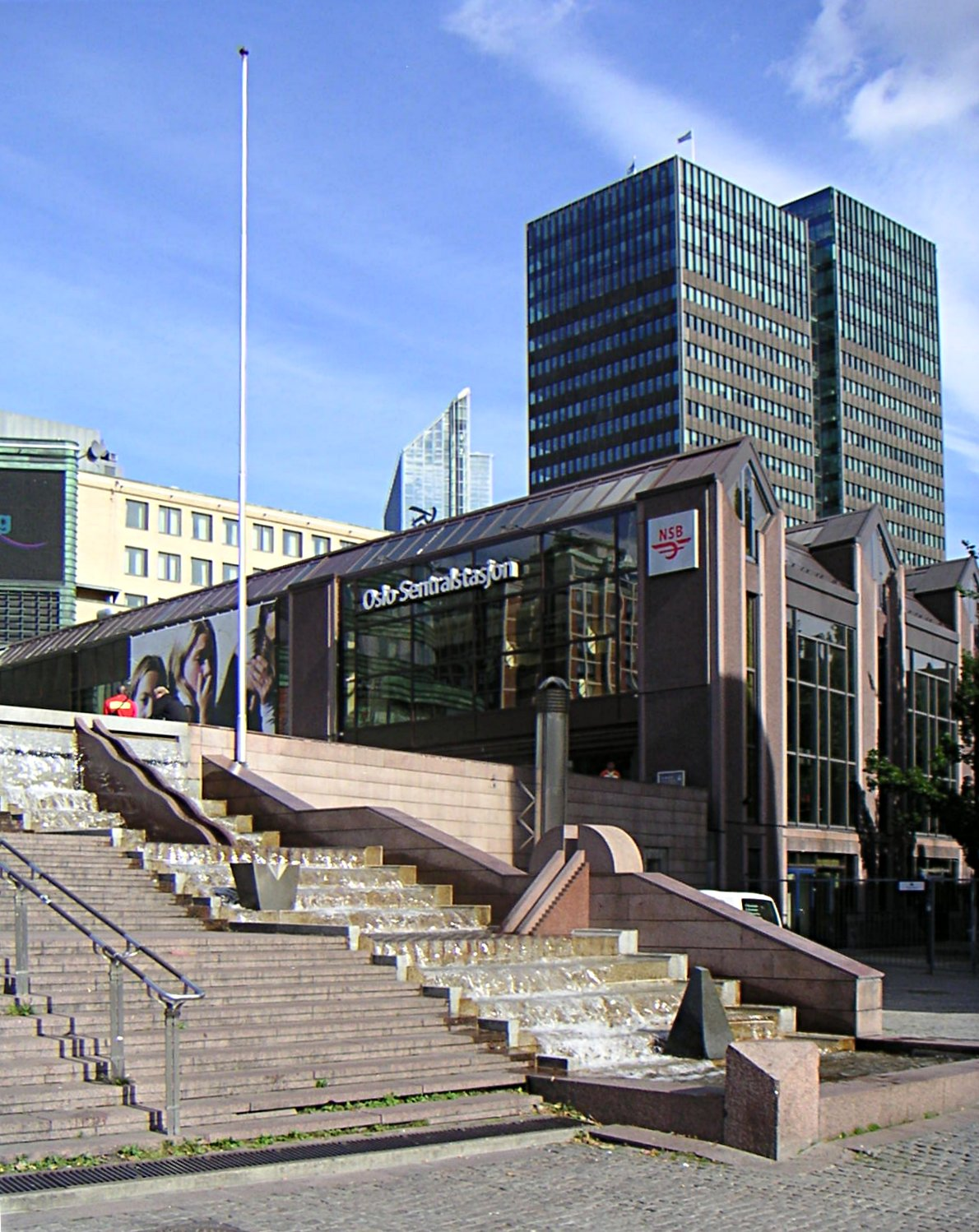
- Location: Oslo, Norway
- Date: 2 July 1982 (UTC+01:00)
- Attack type: Bombing
- Deaths: 1
- Injuries: 11

The Oslo Central Station bombing (Norwegian: Bombeattentatet på Oslo S) was a bomb attack on the central train station of Oslo, the capital of Norway, on 2 July 1982. The homemade bomb was hidden in a locker at Østbanehallen and the explosion caused extensive damage to the station. A young woman, Elin Stoltenberg Dahl was killed.

Eight days after the attack, another bomb was found in the station's ticket hall, which had 2 kg more explosives. It failed to detonate.

An unnamed 18-year-old man from Nordstrand was arrested a month later after a shotgun was fired. His fingerprints matched identically with the station bombing incident, and he later admitted carrying out the attack. His motive for the bombing was to extort the Norwegian State Railways (NSB) for money. He was also convicted of 30 other criminal offenses, including theft, vandalism, shootings and also a plan to bomb a train track at Ekeberg. He was jailed for eleven years.
