= 1953 Col des Nuages derailment =

Railway accident caused by sabotage

Col des Nuages derailment

Details
- Date: 24 June 1953
- Location: Eastern French Indochina
- Cause: Bombing

Statistics
- Deaths: Over 100

The Col des Nuages derailment was a train derailment that occurred in eastern French Indochina, in modern-day Vietnam, on 24 June 1953, during the First Indochina War. Railway officials announced the day after that "about 100 or more" were killed when a passenger train plunged 50 feet through a sabotaged viaduct.

Two locomotives and 18 cars crashed down in a ravine at the Col des Nuages (Pass of the Clouds, known now as the Hai Van Pass), a mountain pass on the route between the ancient Vietnamese capital of Huế and the port of Tourane (Đà Nẵng). The pass had frequently been the scene of attacks by the communist-directed Viet Minh rebels.

Officials said that a strong explosive charge detonated just as the train arrived at the viaduct, tumbling a 25-foot span into the ravine.

== See also ==
- Railway accidents in Vietnam
