= Reactions to the 2004 Madrid train bombings =

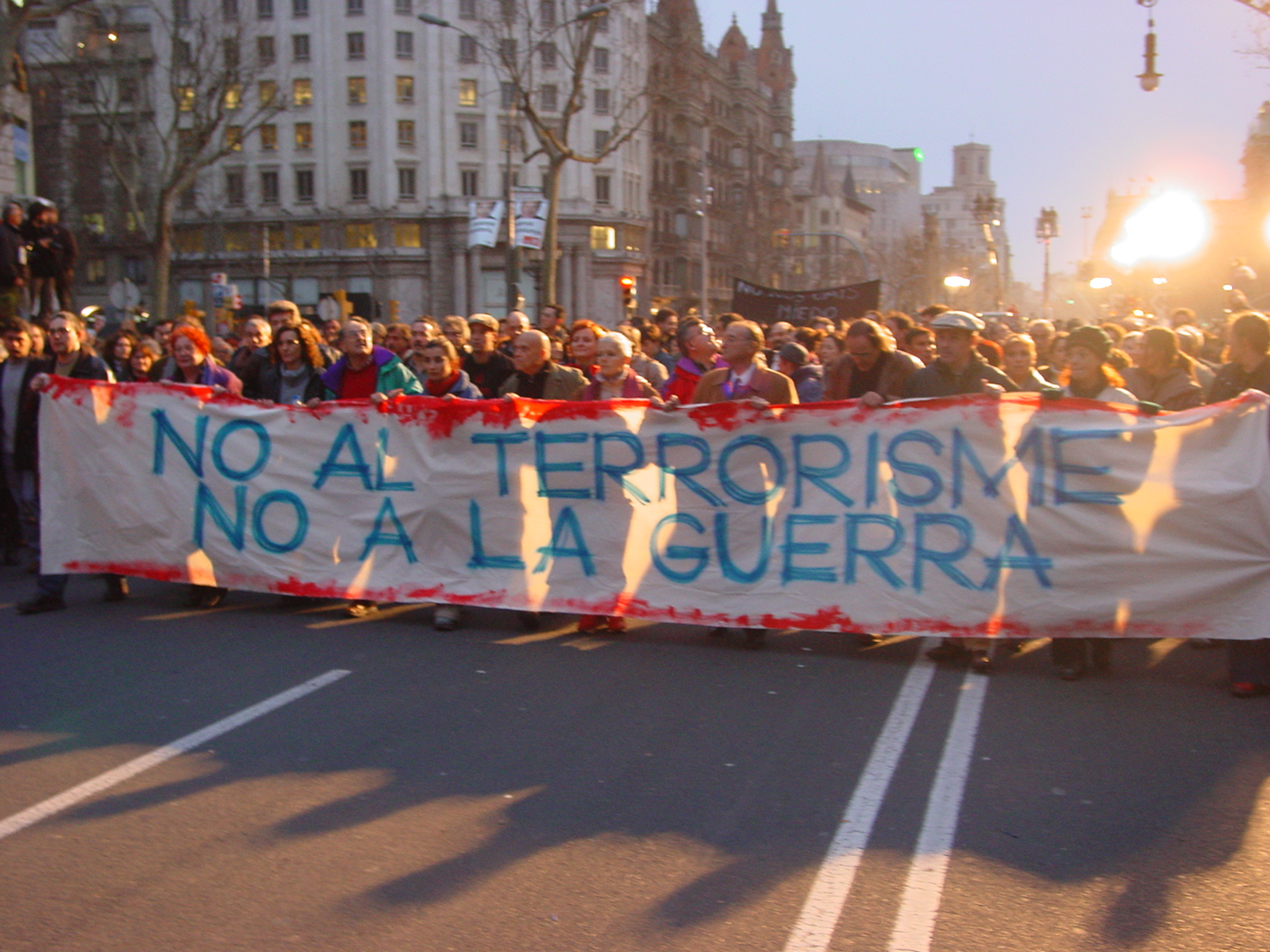
Demonstration in Barcelona. The banner, in Catalan, reads "No to terrorism, no to war"

Reactions to the 2004 Madrid train bombings are the various responses and actions from the Spanish government, the Spanish population and from international leaders in the wake of the terrorist attacks that occurred on 11 March 2004. The bombings caused massive demonstrations in Spain, with 11.4 million demonstrators expressing solidarity for the victims and demanding answers about the attacks. Initial attribution to ETA by the Spanish government was soon followed by suspicions of al-Qaeda involvement. The bombings had a global impact, with most world leaders condemning the attacks and expressing solidarity and support to Spain. Spain and other European countries subsequently took security measures and raised terror alerts.

== Social ==
On 12 March 2004, Spaniards took to the streets protesting against the Madrid train bombings in a government-organized demonstration to condemn ETA, which at the time was being blamed for the attacks. Vigo, which has a population of 300,000 inhabitants, saw 400,000 demonstrators on its streets. The protests were peaceful, including members of the leading political parties marching together down Madrid's Paseo de Castellana in solidarity against terrorism. More than two million people convened on Madrid's streets screaming: "Not everyone is here, 191 are missing, we will never forget you." There were also people wondering "Who did it?" in reference to the "lack of information provided by the government."

Demonstrations Total: 11,400,000 demonstrators (28% of Spanish population)
Madrid	2,000,000
Barcelona	1,500,000
Valencia	700,000
Sevilla	650,000
Málaga	400,000
Vigo	400,000
Zaragoza	400,000
Murcia	300,000
Oviedo	300,000
Cádiz	300,000
Bilbao	300,000
Granada	250,000
Alicante	250,000
Santa Cruz de Tenerife	250,000
Valladolid	250,000
Las Palmas de Gran Canaria	225,000
Córdoba	200,000
A Coruña	200,000
Palma de Mallorca	140,000
Pamplona	125,000
Guadalajara	120,000?
Huelva	120,000
Jaén	120,000?
Almería	120,000
Salamanca	100,000
Santiago de Compostela	100,000
Castellón	100,000
Albacete	100,000
Logroño	100,000
León	100,000
Burgos	100,000
Vitoria	90,000
Santander	85,000
Badajoz	80,000
Ferrol	80,000
Ourense	80,000
Pontevedra	75,000
Ciudad Real	70,000
Girona	58,000
Cáceres	50,000
Cartagena	50,000
Lugo	50,000
Alcalá de Henares	45,000
Ibiza	42,000
Tarragona	40,000
Lleida	40,000
Segovia	40,000
Zamora	40,000
Ceuta	35,000
Melilla	30,000
Cuenca	30,000
Lorca	25,000
Toledo	25,000
Talavera de la Reina	25,000
Palencia	25,000
Mérida	20,000
Medina del Campo	15,000

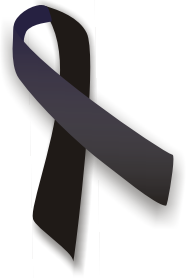
All TV stations replaced their logos with black ribbons overlaid on the Spanish flag at 18:00, visible in the upper-right corner of the television screen".

The following day, three Moroccans and two Indians were arrested and a videotape from a purported al Qaeda official claiming responsibility was also discovered.

Again the people of Madrid took to the streets, mainly congregating in the Puerta del Sol plaza, where there are a number of government buildings. This time the mood was not so peaceful. The crowd on Puerta del Sol chanted and bashed bottles and dustbin lids in a demonstration of anger towards Aznar. Meanwhile, people gathered in unofficial demonstrations in front of PP (Partido Popular) offices in all the major cities in Spain.

The demonstrations of 13 March were allegedly invoked via spontaneous cell phone messages ending in the phrase "pásalo" ("pass it on"). The candidate of the governing conservative party, Mariano Rajoy, complained on television about the demonstrations and demanded that the opposition parties condemn them. On behalf of the Socialist party, Alfredo Pérez Rubalcaba gave a message saying that "the Spanish people do not deserve a government that lies to them" and that they had neither organized nor supported the demonstrations. According to Spanish electoral law, party-political demonstrations are illegal the day leading up to the election.

On 13th in Pamplona, a woman demanded baker Ángel Berrueta to put a poster on his bakery attributing the attacks to ETA. Minutes after he refused, the woman's husband (a policeman) and their 19-years-old son stabbed and shot Berrueta dead. It was later sentenced as a "murder with ideological motivation" since the baker was a founder of an association helping Basque nationalist rioters. On 14th, a woman died of a heart attack during police charge against a demonstration in Hernani condemning the Pamplona murder.

Rumours circulated afterwards, and were propagated by film director Pedro Almodóvar, that the government had approached King Juan Carlos and asked him to postpone voting, which the King responded would constitute a coup d'état. Days later, the PP threatened to sue Almodóvar for his comments.

== Political ==
The attacks came three days before the Sunday elections.

A decree declaring three days of official mourning was issued by the government, and five minutes of silence were observed on Friday. Demonstrations were called for Friday evening in cities across the country, under the motto "With the victims, with the constitution and for the defeat of terrorism". The Catalan government led by Pasqual Maragall also declared official mourning in Catalonia. The government's chosen motto was very criticized by all the opposition because the "with the Constitution" inclusion in the motto implied that the bombs were set by the ETA, while many in the opposition believed that it was made by an Islamic group in retaliation for having Spanish troops in Iraq.

The first government official to make an open public statement was Juan José Ibarretxe Markuartu, head of government in the Basque Country, two hours after the attacks. He unequivocally blamed ETA and said, "When ETA attacks, the Basque heart breaks into a thousand pieces".

In another early public appearance, Interior Minister Acebes pointed in unambiguous terms to ETA, although by the end of the day he said that no line of investigation would be ignored.

The head of the Catalan government Maragall said, "We are all Madrileños today", and continued: "if terrorists intended to divide us, they will have achieved the exact opposite, and the best way to reject terror is to vote on Sunday". Josep-Lluís Carod-Rovira of the Catalan nationalist party, the ERC, who had recently come under fire for secretly meeting with ETA and advocating dialogue, said he would not communicate with ETA again but someone else should do so to prevent them from committing any more bloodshed. "We thought we had already seen everything, but unfortunately that was not the case", he lamented.

By the time Aznar and the King had made their public statements in the afternoon, doubts over ETA's involvement were substantial enough that both of them avoided naming a culprit, and they referred just to "terrorists". Aznar insisted on the need to stay the course, echoing his Interior Minister's earlier remarks.

Later that week, Queen Sofía along with her son Felipe de Borbón (at the time Prince of Asturias), and his fiancee, Letizia Ortiz arrived at Gregorio Marañón Hospital in Madrid to visit and comfort both victims and doctors.

Many people suspected that ETA was being blamed in order to hide any al-Qaeda influence, since that could mean the massacre was in response to the Iraq War. According to the Real Instituto Elcano, this could have resulted in the Aznar government losing the Sunday elections.

== National ==
Most TV stations reported the attack during their regular morning news programmes, starting around 08:00. The programme on Antena 3 lasted until 14:00. Madrid newspapers issued special midday editions, and TV stations rearranged their regular programming schedules. The public stations TVE (national) and Telemadrid (regional) did not break for commercials during the day. All TV stations replaced their logos with black ribbons overlaid on the Spanish flag at 18:00, visible in the upper-right corner of the television screen. That week, the satirical magazine El Jueves, known for its mordacious, highly provocative front pages, published a black front page for the first time in 25 years.

People across Spain flocked to hospitals and mobile blood donation units in such numbers that the need for blood for transfusions was more than satisfied by 10:30, although continued donations were requested for the coming days. The deceased were moved to IFEMA, the largest convention centre in Madrid, for identification by their relatives.

Riay Tatary Bakry, president of the Union of Muslim Communities in Spain, stated on 1 April 2004 that his organization had no plan to publicly urge mosques to step up their battle against terrorism. He said the union will continue to work privately with government officials.

== International ==
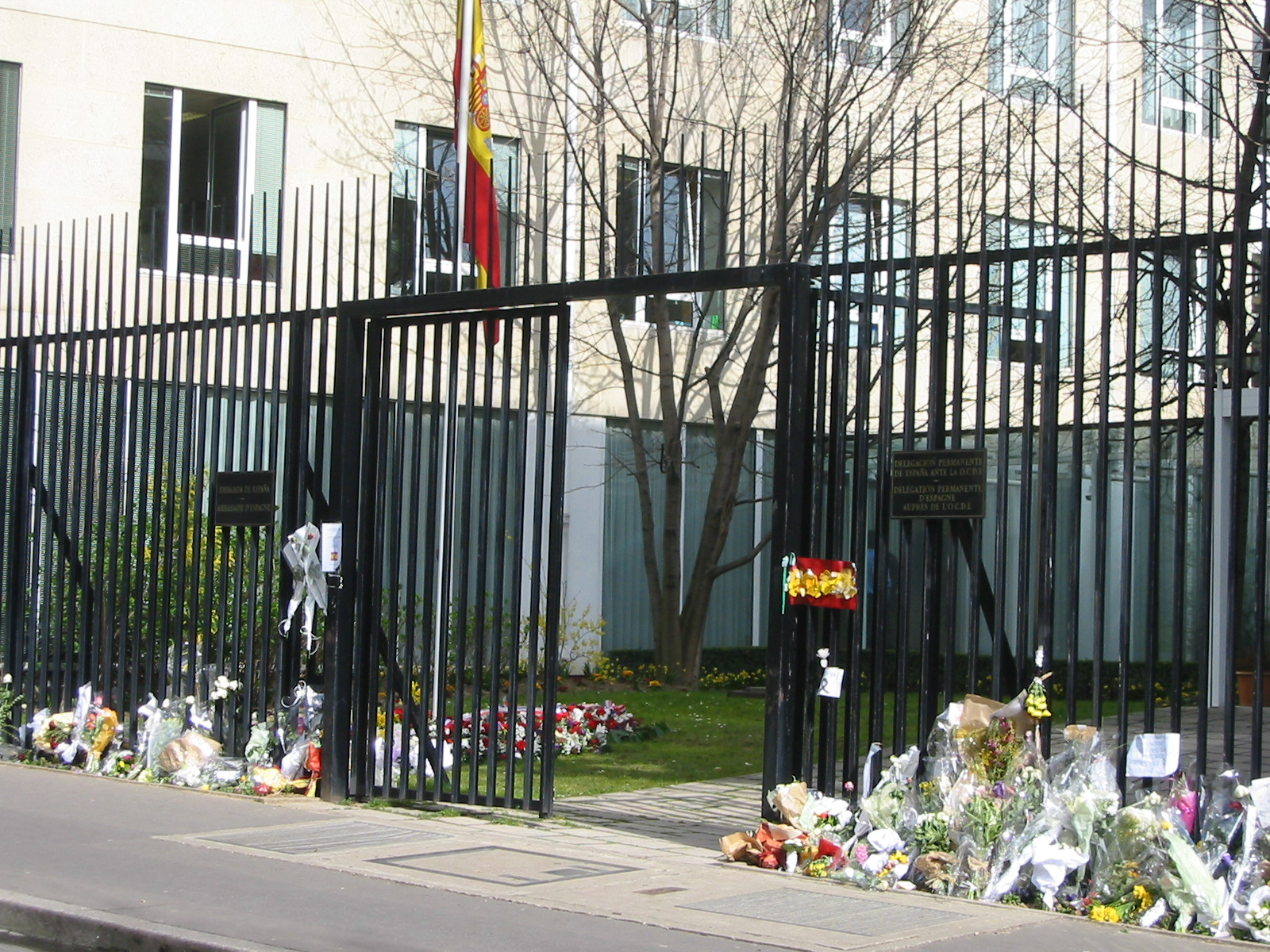
The Spanish Embassy in Paris on 17 March.

Sympathy poured in from governments worldwide immediately following the bombings, led by Spain's partners in the European Union. France raised its terror alert level, and Athens' security was tightened at train stations and the Spanish Embassy. Similar measures were adopted in Italy.

World leaders were united in their condemnation of the attacks. The United States, United Kingdom, and Russia said the attacks demonstrated the need for a toughened resolve against terrorists. Queen Elizabeth II sent a message of condolence to the Spanish King on behalf of the British people. A PLO/Palestinian National Authority official also condemned the attacks targeting civilians.

U.S. President George W. Bush called Prime Minister Aznar and King Juan Carlos to offer his condolences to the Spanish people and condemn the vicious attack of terrorism. He expressed "Our country's deepest sympathies toward those who lost their life...I told them we weep with the families. We stand strong with the people of Spain" The U.S. Senate observed a moment of silence and unanimously passed a resolution expressing outrage and urging President Bush to provide all possible assistance to Spain in pursuing those responsible for the attacks. President Bush led a memorial service at the Spanish ambassador's residence in Washington and gave an interview with a Spanish television network the following day. The US government created the Visible Intermodal Prevention and Response team (VIPR) programme in response to these attacks.

European Commission President Romano Prodi called the attack ferocious and senseless The European Parliament observed a minute of silence; its president Pat Cox expressed the parliament's condolences, and a resolution was introduced proposing 11 March as a European Day of Remembrance of Victims of Terrorism. Pope John Paul II condemned the bombings in a message to Catholic leaders in Spain. Many nations extended offers of material support to the Spanish government. By 17 March, governments around Europe had voiced their concerns that the Spanish government had jeopardized their security by feeding them false information about ETA's involvement. On 17 March 2004, German interior minister Otto Schily called for a special European summit to handle the Madrid bombings. The summit was held on 25–26 March 2004.

The UN Security Council unanimously passed Resolution 1530 condemning the bombings. This happened early in the day and, at the request of the Spanish government, the resolution accused ETA unambiguously of being responsible. The resolution condemns in the strongest terms the bomb attack in Madrid, Spain, perpetrated by the terrorist group ETA. After al-Qaeda involvement became clear, Germany and Russia voiced their concern over Spain's hasty assurances and suggested adding the word "allegedly" to the statement. On 15 March, Spain's ambassador to the UN Inocencio Arias submitted an unapologetic letter updating the Security Council on the progress of the investigation, repeating that the Spanish government had the strong conviction that ETA was involved. UN Secretary General Kofi Annan said that:"I think there is a lesson here for everybody, including the council members".

The human rights group Amnesty International condemned the attack, saying attacks targeting civilians could never be justified. The organization also pointed out that killing of civilians on such a scale may constitute a crime against humanity

UEFA and the Spanish Government and Football Federation decided that Spanish football teams due to play matches on 11 March and 12 should do so, lest they give the impression that the militants had disrupted normal life, and the teams complied with this decision. Out of respect for the victims, members of Spanish football teams wore black armbands. The Spanish Government and Football Federation asked that all games involving Spanish teams begin with a moment of silence for the victims.

Leaders across the world sent letters of mourning to King Juan Carlos and Prime Minister José María Aznar. Most EU countries declared 12 March a day of national mourning as a sign of solidarity. There were demonstrations in cities across Europe and the Spanish-speaking world on 12 March, including Brussels, Paris, Lisbon, Helsinki, Geneva, Berlin, Stockholm, Buenos Aires, Mexico City and Bogotá.

Cuban President Fidel Castro was more critical, however. Speaking during a television interview on 13 March 2004 in Havana, Castro accused Spain's government of deceiving its citizens over the Madrid train bombings for electoral gain. He went on to assert that Prime Minister José María Aznar had known an Islamic group was behind the explosions on 11 March, but preferred to blame ETA ahead of the general elections just three days away. Germany also condemned Aznar, who had not been told the explosives used were not of the type used by ETA. Otto Schily accused Aznar of not acting responsibly by claiming that the perpetrators were ETA – therefore a national problem – rather than al-Qaeda, which ought to have heightened the threat to other countries.

Germany hastily arranged an urgent meeting of European Union security chiefs on 14 March 2004 as possible al-Qaeda involvement in the Madrid bombings set alarm bells ringing across the world. On the same day, Queen Elizabeth II ordered that the Spanish national anthem be played during the Changing of the Guard at Buckingham Palace.

The attacks also reawakened fears of terrorism amongst investors, with most European stock markets falling between two and three percent on 11 March. Stocks dropped in London and in New York, with the U.S. Dow Jones Industrial Average diving after speculation of involvement by al-Qaeda. Airline and tourism-related stocks were particularly affected by sharp declines in share prices. In Tokyo, stocks opened sharply lower the next day.

On 15 March, at the request of Irish leader Bertie Ahern, then President of the European Council, all of Europe observed three minutes of silence at noon Central European Time (CET).

== Psychological ==
Using the Emotional Climate Scale, the dominant personal emotions in response to 11 March were sadness, disgust, anger, and contempt. The most intense reaction was sadness rather than fear. These negative emotions declined after two months. According to a study with 167 participants, some people experienced post-traumatic growth. Mostly women experienced post-traumatic growth, especially if they were indirectly exposed to the attack. The emotional state of fear of those days in Madrid was the basis for a scientific work which showed the association between emotional states of fear and premature rupture of membranes at term.

== Popular culture ==
In October 2004, the Spanish pop singer Luz Casal released her album "Sencilla Alegría", which included a song dedicated to the victims of the terrorist attack. Four years later, the popular music group La Oreja de Van Gogh released their album A las cinco en el Astoria with a song titled "Jueves", that served as a remembrance to this incident.

Also in 2004, Antonio Soto-Mesa commissioned composer Francisco Estévez to write Canto de Vida y Esperanza, homenaje las víctimas 11-M which was premiered by Quinteto Soto-Mesa, a prestigious student group.

Author Jaime Rubio Hancock remarks that, unlike the humor based on the September 11 attacks or the humor about ETA actions, practically no jokes circulated about the 2004 attacks. Rubio proposes that, in this case, there was no hegemonic medio discourse directing the emotions of the public. The contradictory theses about the authors channeled the public humor towards satire of the government response and it was expressed in varied media instead of folk jokes.
