= Phú Lộc district =

Coordinates: 16.250°N 107.917°E

Phú Lộc District Huyện Phú Lộc
- District
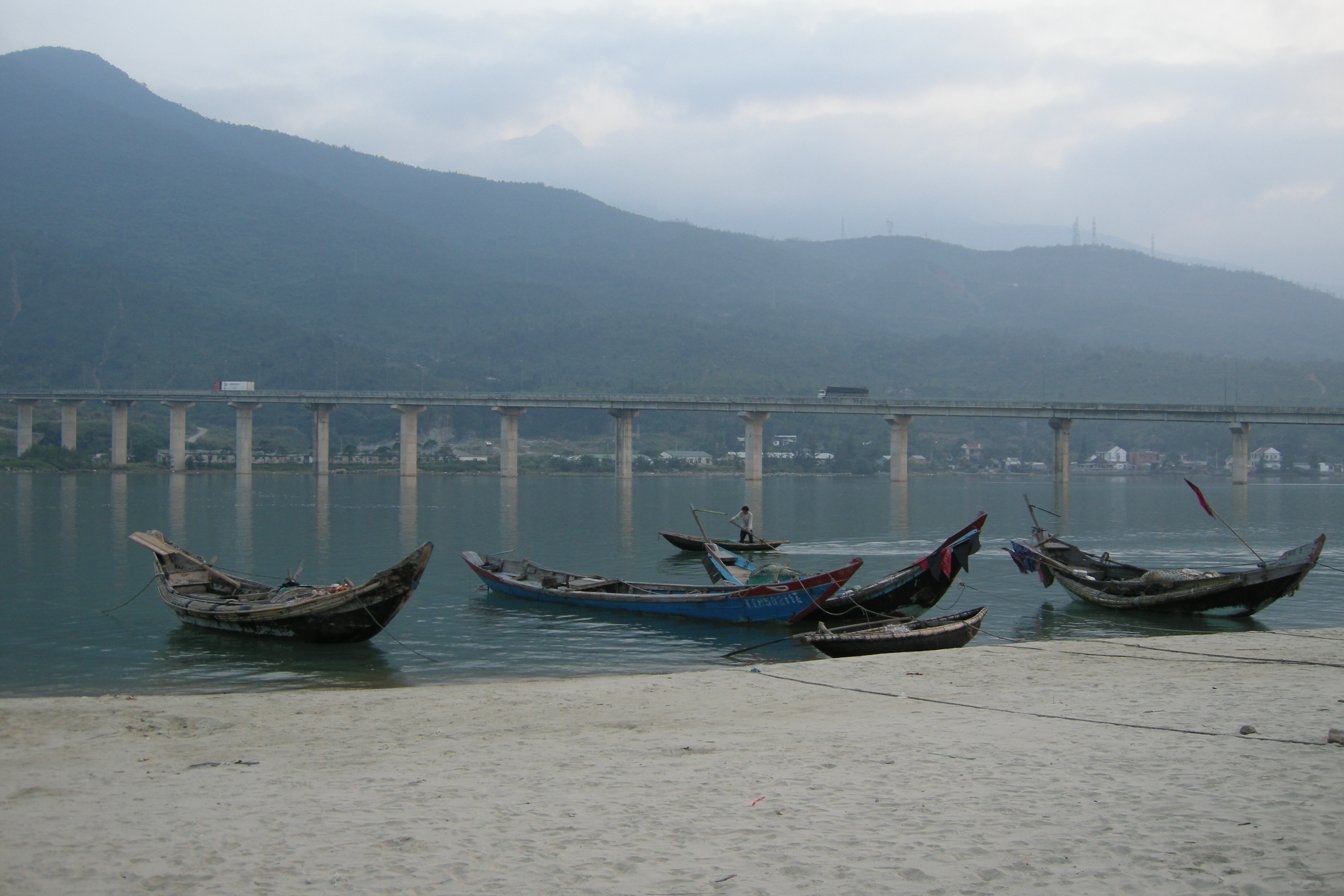
- Lăng Cô Lagoon
- Interactive map of Phú Lộc District
- Country: Vietnam
- Region: North Central Coast
- Municipality: Huế
- Capital: Phú Lộc

Area
  - Total: 281 sq mi (728 km^{2})

Population (2003)
  - Total: 149,418
- Time zone: UTC+7 (UTC + 7)

Phú Lộc is a rural district of Huế in the North Central Coast region of Vietnam. As of 2003 the district had a population of 149,418. The district covers an area of 728 km^{2} (281 sq mi). The district capital lies at Phú Lộc.

The area abuts the South China Sea to the east and the Hải Vân Pass to the south. The city of Phú Lộc is the main economic focal point of the district, mainly due to tourism.

The district comprises the townships of Lăng Cô and Phú Lộc, and the communes of Lộc Trì, Lộc Bổn, Vinh Hải, Lộc Hòa, Lộc An, Lộc Bình, Lộc Thủy, Vinh Giang, Lộc Vĩnh, Vinh Mỹ, Lộc Sơn, Lộc Tiến, Vinh Hiền, Vinh Hưng, Xuân Lộc and Lộc Điền.

The district is divided into three sectors, from Huế and moving southwards towards Phú Lộc is Sector 1, opposite is Sector 2, and the region between Lăng Cô and Phú Lộc is Sector 3.
