= List of rail accidents (2000–2009) =

This is a list of rail accidents from 2000 to 2009. For a list of terrorist incidents involving trains, see List of terrorist incidents involving railway systems.

== 2000 ==
- January 4 – Norway – Åsta accident, Åsta in Åmot Municipality: Two diesel passenger trains collided in Rørosbanen killing 19. The fire after the collision lasted nearly six hours.
- February 6 – Germany – Brühl train derailment: The D 203 "Schweiz-Express" train travelling from Amsterdam to Basel negotiated a low-speed turnout at three times the correct speed and derailed near Brühl station, killing 9 people.
- March 2 – Denmark – Kølkær. Two regional trains heading to Herning and Vejle collided in Kolkær station. The train to Herning had entered the station and was slowing down when it was hit head-on by the oncoming Vejle train at 116 km/h. One passenger in the Herning train and both train drivers were killed, 10 passengers were seriously injured. The investigation concluded that the crash was caused by the driver of the Vejle train, who had completely ignored stop signals.
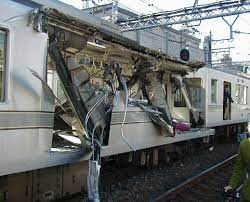
- Naka-Meguro derailment
  March 8 – Japan – Naka-Meguro derailment: The last car of a TRTA Hibiya Line train derailed and was hit by a Tobu Railway train traveling in the opposite direction, killing five people and injuring 63.
- March 28 – United States – A school bus failed to stop at a crossbuck in Tennga, Georgia and was struck by a CSX train, killing three people.
- April 18 – Indonesia – In Kosambi, three trains (a container train, an animal transport train and Argo Bromo express train) collided, killing three stowaways on the container train.
- June 6 – Switzerland – A passenger train and a freight train collided at Hüswil, killing one.
- July 6 – France – In Paris, a Eurostar Train derailed due to a fault on the train track, injuring six.
- July 13 – Canada – A Canadian National train heading westbound pulling grain hoppers hit a semi-trailer that had become stuck at a level crossing west of Wainwright, Alberta. The two locomotives and 28 cars derailed. The train crew suffered only minor injuries after jumping from the train prior to the collision
- August 26 – United States – A Dakota, Minnesota, and Eastern train derailed in Brookings, South Dakota, killing the conductor and severely injuring the engineer. The crash was caused intentionally by a vandal who broke the lock off of a railroad switch using a hammer and covered the warning reflector with at least one trash bag as part of a 'prank.'
- October 17 – United Kingdom – Hatfield rail crash – In Hertfordshire, a faulty rail shattered into 300 pieces due to rolling contact fatigue while a GNER London to Leeds InterCity 225 express was passing at 115 miles per hour (185 km/h). Four people were killed and 102 injured. The crash forced the biggest and most expensive re-railing exercise in British history, with huge service disruption for many months. Infrastructure owner Railtrack was found guilty in one of the longest rail-related trials in UK legal history, but manslaughter charges against company managers were not sustained.
- November 11 – Austria – Kaprun disaster: The Gletscherbahn 2 funicular train caught fire in a tunnel after an unsafely installed heater overheated, killing 155 people and leaving only 12 survivors.
- December 2 – India – Sarai Banjara rail disaster, a crowded commuter train crashed into a derailed freight train in Punjab, killing more than 45 people.

== 2001 ==
- January 12 – Republic of the Congo – Nvoungouti: More than 30 people were killed after two trains collided because of a brake failure.
- February 7 – Canada – Toronto: Ontario Northland Railway's Northlander passenger train derailed in the Don Valley near the Bayview Extension and Pottery Road area, slightly injuring two passengers.
- February 28 – United Kingdom – Selby rail crash: A sleep-deprived driver on the M62 motorway fell asleep at the wheel, causing his Land Rover to swerve off the road and travel down an embankment onto the main line below. After failing to reverse off the track, the driver exited the vehicle and while contacted emergency services, during which the vehicle was hit by a GNER InterCity 225 passenger train which derailed and collided at high speed with a coal train traveling in the opposite direction. Ten people were killed (all due to the second collision) and over 80 were injured. The Land Rover driver was later jailed for 5 years for causing death by dangerous driving.
- March 27 – Belgium – Pécrot rail crash: Two passenger trains collided on the same track, killing eight people and injuring 12. Lack of common language was seen as a factor.
- April 12 – Canada – Stewiacke Via derailment: a teenager tampered with a track switch, derailing Via Rail Canada's Ocean, injuring as many as 22 people.
- May 15 – United States – CSX 8888 incident, Toledo, Ohio: A CSX freight train of 47 cars, including some with hazardous molten phenol acid, ran away in the yard at Toledo with no engineer aboard. The engineer had stepped out to reset a switch but had improperly applied the dynamic brake, causing the train to accelerate. It ran for 66 miles (106 km) to Kenton, Ohio, before being stopped by a railroad worker who jumped aboard and managed to stop it. CSX slowed the train down to 10 mph (16 km/h) by coupling an engine onto the end. This incident was dubbed the "Crazy Eights" incident in reference to the lead locomotive's number (#8888). The incident inspired the 2010 Tony Scott film Unstoppable, starring Denzel Washington and Chris Pine.
- June 22 – India – Kadalundi train derailment: Six carriages of the Mangalore-Chennai Mail train derailed while crossing Bridge 924 after it shifted following heavy rain. Three carriages plunge into the swollen Kadalundi River, killing 59 people.
- July 18 – United States – Howard Street Tunnel fire, Baltimore, Maryland: A 60-car CSX train carrying chemicals and wood products derailed in a 1.7-mile-long (2.7 km) tunnel, causing water contamination and a fire that burned for six days.
- July 29 – United States – An Amtrak Texas Eagle en route from San Antonio to Chicago derailed in Sabula, Missouri, located 120 miles (190 km) away from St. Louis, possibly due to severe weather and flash flooding. Four passengers and the engineer were injured.
- August 19 – Sri Lanka – Kurunegala train crash: 15 people died after the Udarata Menike train derailed due to speeding and overcrowding.
- September 2 – Indonesia – In Cirebon, a passenger train and a locomotive collided, killing 40 people and seriously injuring 37.
- September 13 – United States – In Wendover, Utah, the westbound California Zephyr derailed after striking a coal train, causing several injuries.
- November 15 – United States – Canadian National train E243 running from Flat Rock, Michigan to Flint, Michigan collided with another CN train, L533 (bound for Detroit), at the Andersonville Siding on CN's Holly Subdivision in Michigan. The engineer and conductor on E243 were killed.
- December 7 — United States – A BNSF freight train collided head-on with another BNSF freight train that was parked in a siding in Arminto, Wyoming due to a misaligned switch killing an engineer.
- December 18 – Greece – In Orestiada, a train got stuck in a snow drift and derailed near the Bulgarian border, killing one person.
- December 25 - Indonesia - In Brebes, 45 people were killed after a Empu Jaya train collision with Gaya Baru Malam train in Ketanggungan station.

== 2002 ==
- January 18 – United States – Minot train derailment: A Canadian Pacific train derailed near a residential area west of Minot, North Dakota. Seven tank cars ruptured, releasing more than 750,000 litres (200,000 US gallons) of anhydrous ammonia which vaporized in the sub-zero air and formed a toxic cloud that drifted over much of Minot. One man died and numerous others were treated for chemical exposure.
- February 6 – South Africa – 2002 Charlotte's Dale train collision: Two commuter trains collided in Charlotte's Dale near Durban, killing 22 people, including 16 children.
- February 20 – Egypt – 2002 El Ayyat railway accident: A train packed to double capacity caught fire after a cooking gas cylinder exploded, killing 383 people.
- February 21 – Switzerland – A freight train and a locomotive collided at Chiasso, killing two people and injuring three.
- March 30 – Spain – In Catalonia, a Euromed Express Train collided with another Euromed Express Train crushing many cars, killing two people and injuring 100.
- April 18 – United States – Crescent City, Florida: 21 cars of an Amtrak Auto-Train derailed, killing four people and injuring 142.
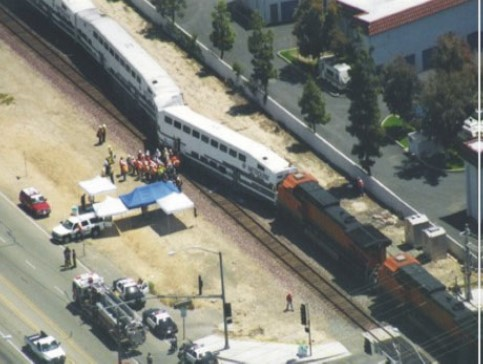
- 2002 Placentia train collision
  April 23 – United States – 2002 Placentia train collision, In Placentia, California: A BNSF Railway freight train, which ran a stop signal, collided head-on with a Metrolink train near Atwood Junction, at the intersection of Orangethorpe Avenue and Van Buren Street. Two people died and 22 were seriously injured.
- May 10 – United Kingdom – 2002 Potters Bar rail accident: A northbound WAGN Class 365 train derailed at high speed, killing seven people and seriously injuring 11.
- May 13 – India – 2002 Jaunpur train crash: 12 people died after a passenger train derailed and crashed in Uttar Pradesh in a suspected act of sabotage
- May 28 — United States — A BNSF coal train and intermodal train collided head-on near Clarendon, Texas, killing the engineer of the intermodal train and injuring the coal train's crew and the intermodal train's conductor. It was revealed that the coal train's crew was distracted by their cell phones, ultimately causing their train to collide with the other train.
- May 30 – United States – Hempfield Township, Westmoreland County, Pennsylvania: a freight train struck a vehicle at an ungated crossing, killing two teenagers and injuring two others.
- June 13 – Sri Lanka – A train derailed while coming into Alawwa station, killing 14 people.
- June 24 – Tanzania – Igandu train collision: Nearly 300 people died after a passenger train rolled backwards into a goods train.
- July 20 – Italy – Rometta Marea derailment: The Palermo–Venice train derailed in Rometta Marea, Messina, killing eight people.
- July 29 – United States – Kensington, Maryland: The eastbound Amtrak Capitol Limited, train 30, while traversing a CSX route, struck a sun kink while traveling at 60 mph (97 km/h). Several cars fell off an embankment and four Superliners overturned against trees. Sixteen people were seriously injured and 79 people suffered minor injuries. The misalignment was determined to be caused by an improperly tamped ballast and excessive speed in the 96 °F (36 °C) sunny weather. "Slow orders" were imposed on passenger trains in the area on very hot days following this accident.
- September 9 – Germany – Bad Münder: Two freight trains collided head-on after a brake failure on one of the trains. A tank car loaded with 1-chloro-2,3-epoxypropane subsequently exploded, contaminating the station and exposing 96 firemen to carcinogenic fumes.
- September 9 – India – Rafiganj train wreck: More than 130 people died after a passenger train derailed and plunged into the Dhave River in Bihar due to sabotaged tracks.
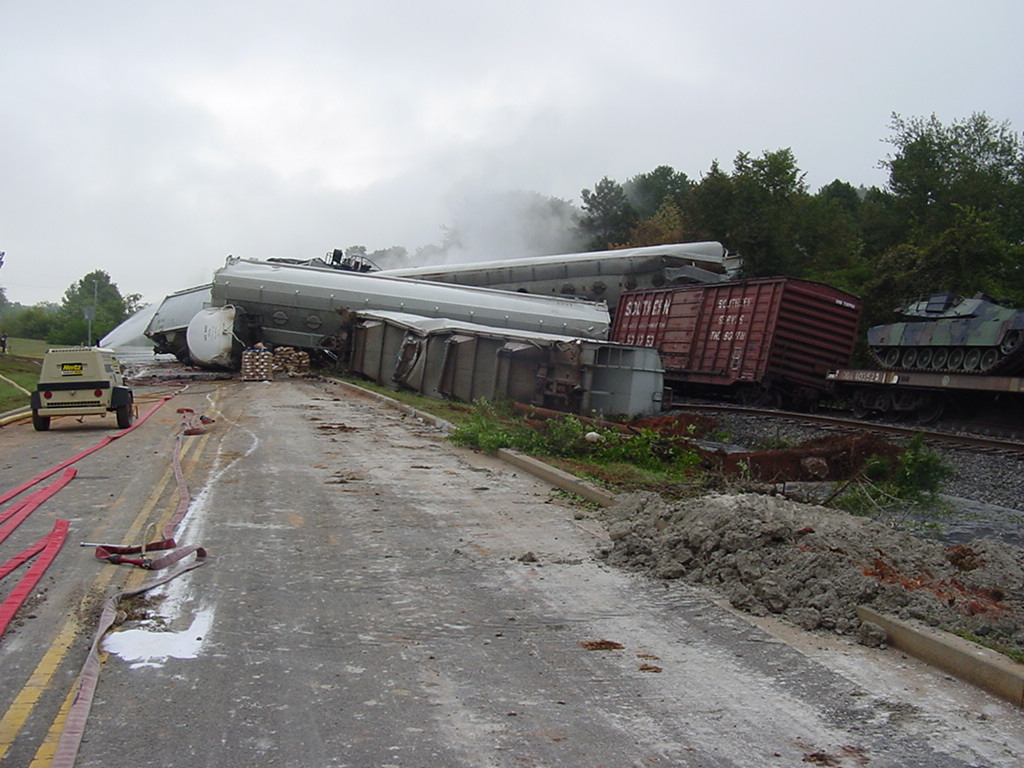
- 2002 Farragut derailment
  September 15 – United States – 2002 Farragut derailment: A Norfolk Southern freight train derailed in Farragut, Tennessee, resulting in a hazardous materials release of fuming sulfuric acid and evacuation of more than 2,600 residents for nearly three days.
- September 27 – United States – Jamaica, New York: Three cars of a JFK Airtrain test train derailed near Federal Circle. The train's lone occupant, a train operator testing the automated equipment, was crushed to death by collapsing cement blocks inside the first car used to evenly distribute the weight inside the car to simulate the weight of customers in passenger service.
- October 13 – Australia – Benalla level crossing collision, Victoria: A heritage train hauled by K class steam locomotive K 183 collided with a B-Double truck that failed to clear the level crossing. The impact caused the locomotive to derail, rolling onto its side, and the locomotive's tender to be forced into the locomotive's cab. Three of the four people in the cab were killed and one critically injured.
- November 6 – France – Nancy: A fire broke out in the front two carriages of an overnight sleeper train heading from Paris to Vienna, killing 12 passengers from smoke inhalation and injuring nine.
- November 7 – Denmark – Holte: An empty S-train turning around failed to brake in time and drove into the path of another S-train heading to Køge station, killing a woman and injuring three passengers, two more seriously.
- December 9 – Indonesia – The Argo Dwipangga train with Solo Balapan-Gambir route, derailed in Prembun, Kebumen Regency, killing five passengers and injuring dozens were injured. The cause of the accident was a rail that shifted due to a box truck that passed through the tunnel under the train tracks just before the Argo Dwipangga passed.

== 2003 ==
- January 3 – India – Ghatnandur train crash: 18 people died in a collision of two trains at Ghatnandur in Maharashtra
- January 31 – Australia – Waterfall rail accident: The driver of a southbound passenger train suffered a heart attack and died; the train then sped out of control and derailed on a curve, overturning several cars and killing seven passengers.
- February 2 – Zimbabwe – Dete train crash. Two trains collided, derailed, and caught fire, killing over 40 people.
- February 3 – Australia – Broadmeadows train runaway and crash, Melbourne, Victoria: An unmanned electric suburban train rolled away from Broadmeadows station and ran for 16.848 kilometres at speeds in excess of 100 km/h through many pedestrian and level crossings before crashing into a stationary diesel passenger train at Southern Cross station derailing both. No serious injuries were reported.
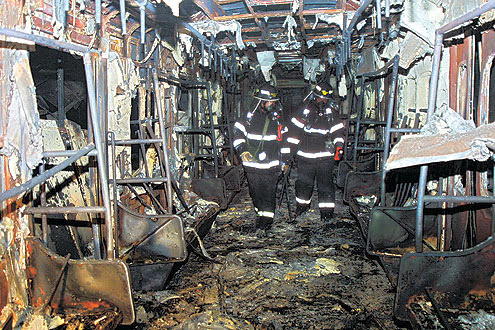
- Daegu subway fire
  February 18 – South Korea – Daegu subway fire: A mentally ill man started a fire which engulfed two subway trains, killing 192 people.
- March 20 – Netherlands – Roermond: The driver of an NS passenger train suffered a heart attack and ran through a red signal before colliding head-on with a freight train. The driver was killed, while six passengers were injured seriously.
- May 6 – United States – Amtrak's Silver Star struck a delivery truck at a private crossing near Hinesville, Georgia killing the engineer and the truck driver.
- May 15 – India – Ladhowal train fire: A passenger train caught fire near Ladhowal in Punjab, killing 38.
- June 3 – Spain – Chinchilla train collision: 19 people died after a Talgo train and a freight train collided head-on in Albacete.
- June 11 – Germany – Six people died and 25 were injured after two passenger trains collided head-on near Schrozberg.
- June 20 – United States – Commerce, California: A runaway cut of 31 cars from a Union Pacific freight train, without a locomotive, carrying lumber derailed at a speed of 95 mph (153 km/h) in a Los Angeles suburb, destroying several homes and rupturing natural gas lines.
- June 22 - India - In Kankavli, a Karwar-Mumbai holiday special train derailed and telescoped over the engine, 34 were killed and dozens were injured.
- June 23 – India – Vaibhavwadi train crash: 51 people died after a special holiday train derailed in Maharashtra.
- July 2 – India – Warangal train crash: 22 people died after a train fell off a bridge due to brake failure into a crowded fish market in Warangal.
- July 7 – United Kingdom – Between Evesham and Pershore, Worcestershire, a First Great Western train collided with a minibus on a level crossing, killing three people in the minibus.
- August 3 – United Kingdom – A Romney, Hythe and Dymchurch Railway steam train hit a car driven across the level crossing. The train driver died, while the car occupants and some train passengers were injured.
- August 7 – Switzerland – Two trains collided at Gsteigwiler, killing one person and injuring 63.
- September 5 - United States - In Anaheim, California, the Big Thunder Mountain Railroad train at Disneyland derailed due to improper maintenance. 1 person was killed and 10 people were injured.
- October 4 – Indonesia – In Bogor Regency, a passenger train rear-ended another between Cilebut and Bogor Stations, injuring 39 people.
- October 12 – United States – Chicago, Illinois: A Metra train derailed after its engineer ignored warning signals telling him to slow down for a track change and continued travelling at 73 miles per hour (117 km/h) over a 10-mile-per-hour (16 km/h) switch. The front locomotive rolled onto its side and caught fire. Forty-five were injured.
- October 14 – Switzerland – Two express trains collided at Zürich Oerlikon railway station, killing one person and injuring 45.

== 2004 ==
- February 15 – United Kingdom – Tebay rail accident, Cumbria, England. A sleeper transporter trolley with defective brakes carrying 16 tonnes of rails was detached from a maintenance train south of Penrith and rolled down the falling gradient until it struck and killed four workmen in a team repairing the line at Tebay, between Oxenholme and Penrith.
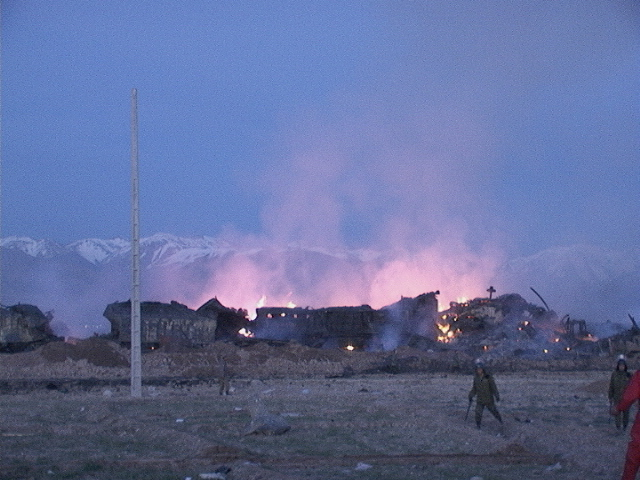
- Nishapur train disaster
  February 18 – Iran – Nishapur train disaster: 51 train cars broke loose from their siding, rolled down the track, derailed and fell down an embankment into Khayyam, near Nishapur. During the cleanup operation, the cargo of the cars exploded (an equivalent of 180 tons of TNT), killing 295 people and leveling Khayyam and damaging three nearby towns. The blast was felt as far away as Mashhad.
- April 6 – United States – Flora, Mississippi: Amtrak's northbound City of New Orleans train derailed due to a track defect. One person was killed and 46 others were injured.
- April 16 – Turkey – Temelli: An overnight İzmir-to-Ankara express hit a truck near Ankara while at a level crossing. Seven to 10 children died and two to five more were injured.
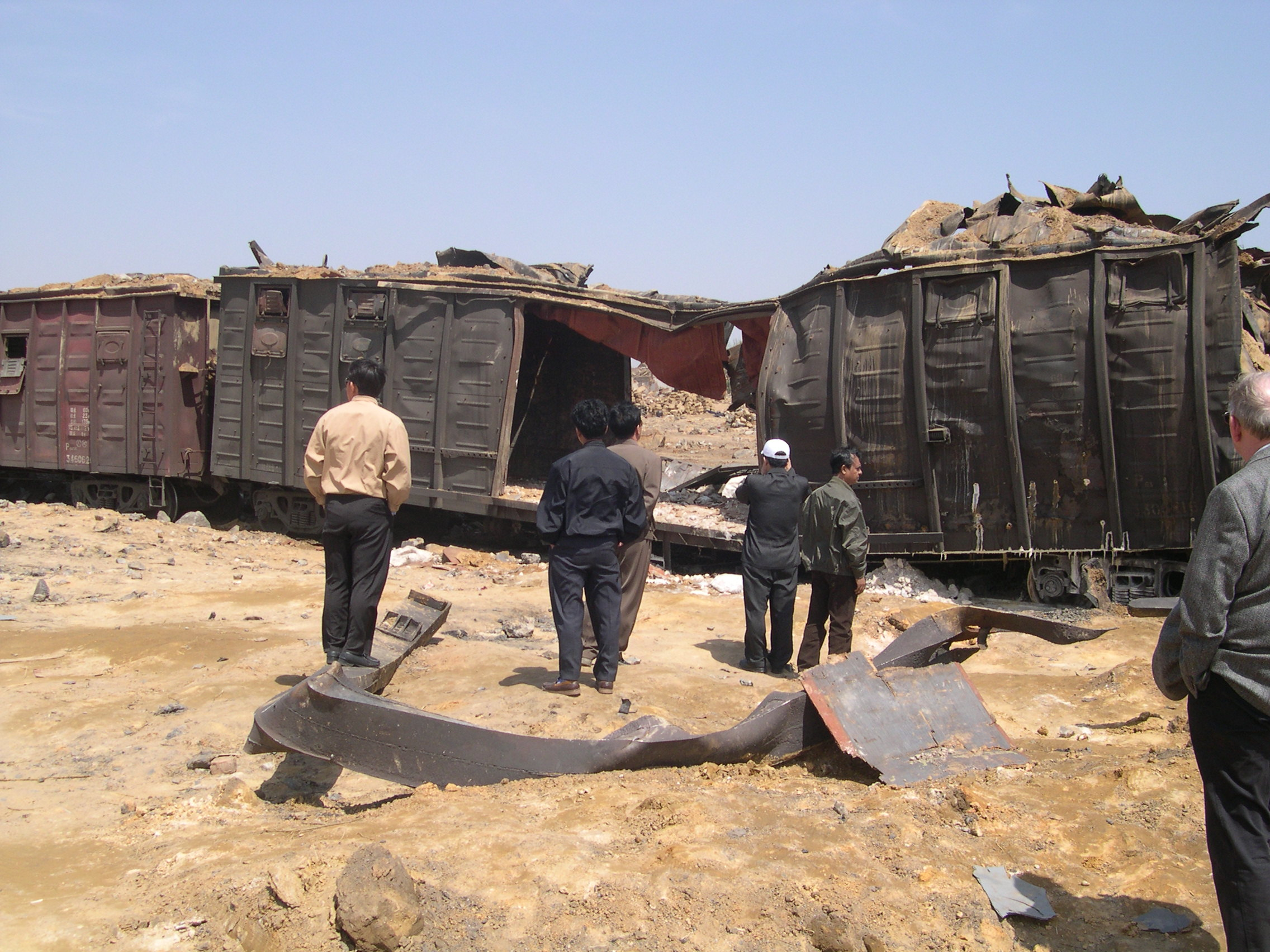
- Ryongchon disaster
  April 22 – North Korea – Ryongchon disaster: 161 people were killed and more than 1,000 injured after an explosion.
- May 19 – United States – near Gunter, Texas: One person died and four were injured after a BNSF train failed to adhere to an after-arrival track warrant and collided with another train.
- June 1 – Denmark – Holstebro: Two regional trains entered the same track and collided head-on. 24 people were injured, two seriously.
- June 17 – India – Karanjadi train crash: 20 people died and 100 were injured after 10 carriages fell off a bridge during a monsoon-induced landslide.
- June 28 – United States – Macdona, Texas, near San Antonio: Four people died and 51 were injured after a Union Pacific train failed to stop at a signal and collided with an idle BNSF train, causing 9,400 US Gallons of liquid chlorine to leak out of a punctured tank car. The liquid chlorine immediately vaporized into a toxic “yellow cloud” that spread over a radius of at least 700 feet (210 m). Among the dead were the UP driver and two residents. Several other residents and many visitors to the SeaWorld theme park were seriously injured by the gas.
- July 22 – Turkey – Pamukova train derailment: An Istanbul–Ankara express derailed at Pamukova, Sakarya Province, killing 41 and injuring 80.
- September 10 – Sweden – Nosaby level crossing disaster: A heavy truck was caught between the barriers at a level crossing, and was hit by a passenger train. The train driver died, while 47 people were injured. The truck driver was found guilty of not attempting to move the vehicle away from the level crossing, and was sentenced to 14 months' imprisonment.
- November 4 - United States - In Washington D.C., two Washington Metro trains on the Red Line collided rear on at Woodley Park station, 20 people were injured.
- November 6 – United Kingdom – Ufton Nervet rail crash: A First Great Western InterCity 125 hit a stationary car driven by an apparently suicidal driver on a level crossing and derailed. Five train passengers and the drivers of both the train and the car died; more than 100 passengers were injured.
- November 11 – United States – San Antonio, Texas: A Union Pacific train derailed off the tracks in an industrial district, killing one man working in a warehouse office and injuring others.
- November 15 – Australia – Cairns Tilt Train derailment: The world's fastest narrow-gauge train derailed at 112 km/h. The accident was blamed on the train travelling too fast on a curved line.
- November 29 – United States – Zephyrhills, Florida: Two CSX freight trains collided in early morning fog at Vitis Junction, killing one and injuring three.
- December 3 – Italy – Two trains collided at Castellaneta after one of them passed a red signal. Twenty people were injured, two seriously.
- December 14 – India – Two passenger trains collided in Punjab, killing 27 people and injuring more than 50.
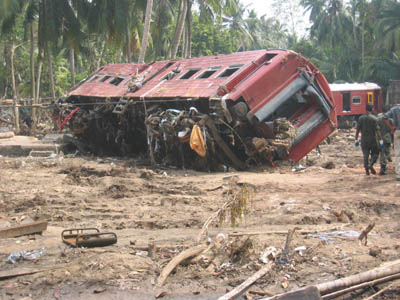
- 2004 Sri Lanka tsunami train wreck
  December 26 – Sri Lanka – 2004 Sri Lanka tsunami train wreck: Approximately 1,700 people died in the world's worst rail disaster after a train was overwhelmed by a tsunami created by the 2004 Indian Ocean earthquake.

== 2005 ==
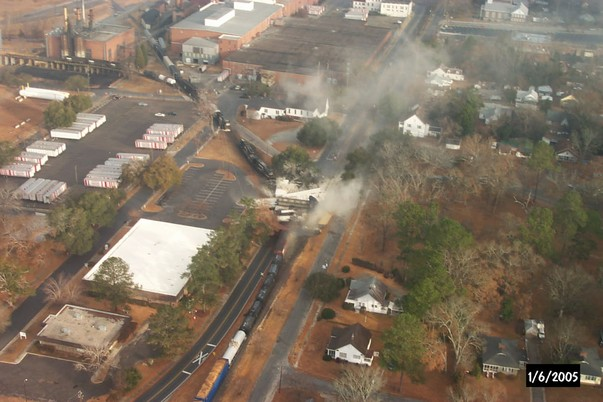
- Graniteville train crash
  January 6 – United States – Graniteville train crash: Nine people (including the engineer) died and more than 250 were injured after a Norfolk Southern freight train collided head-on with a parked freight train near the Avondale Mills plant in Graniteville, South Carolina. A derailed tank car ruptured 90 tons of chlorine gas into the air.
- January 7 – Italy – Crevalcore train crash. A passenger train running from Verona to Bologna failed to stop at a red light and collided head-on with a freight train, near Crevalcore in dense fog, killing 17.
- January 17 – Thailand – an empty MRT (Bangkok) train returning to the depot collided with another train filled with passengers at the Thailand Cultural Centre MRT station. One hundred and forty people were hurt, most of whom sustained only minor injuries, and the entire Metro network was shut down for two weeks.
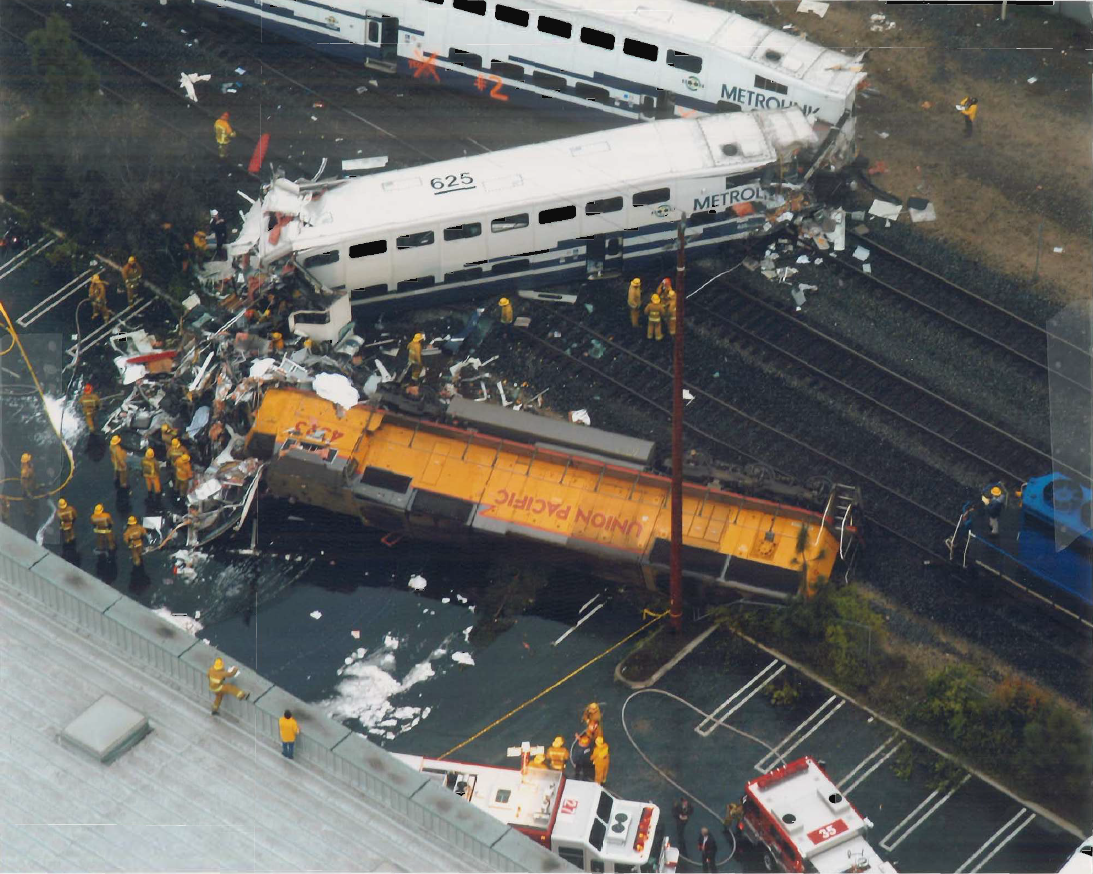
- 2005 Glendale train crash
  January 26 – United States – 2005 Glendale train crash: In a planned suicide attempt during which the suspect changed his mind, a southbound Metrolink double-deck commuter train collided in Glendale, California with the man's vehicle that he has driven onto the tracks and then abandoned. The train derailed, then struck both a moving northbound Metrolink train on the adjacent track as well as a parked Union Pacific freight train on a siding. Eleven people died, about 100 were injured.
- February 3 – India – Nagpur level crossing disaster. A tractor-trailer carrying a wedding party was hit by a train, killing 55 wedding guests.
- February 9 – Latvia – A Lielvarde-Riga passenger train collided with empty stock heading for Riga train depot, killing four people and injuring 32.
- February 14 — United States – Oxnard, California. An Amtrak Pacific Surfliner passenger train traveling from Los Angeles Union Station collided with a semi-truck loaded with strawberries at the Rice Avenue grade crossing. The truck driver, who had stopped at the crossing, suddenly encountered a green traffic light that conflicted the crossing gates coming down. This confused the driver, who started crossing the tracks then, but the traffic light suddenly turned red after a few seconds, making the truck driver stop without realising that the rest of her truck was still on the tracks. The train was traveling too fast to stop in time and completely destroyed the truck's trailer, severely damaging the locomotive and spilling diesel fuel at the crash site. A few passengers of the train had minor injuries.
- February 14 – Denmark – Lyngby: An S-train to Høje Tåstrup ran into a stopped S-train which was heading for Køge at 60–70 km/h. Two passengers and a driver were seriously injured. Snow which had settled on the signals made them difficult to read, meaning the train could not be stopped in time.
- April 21 – India – Vadodara train crash: 18 people died after a collision between a freight and passenger express train.
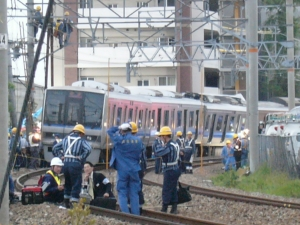
- Investigation at the scene of the Amagasaki rail crash
  April 25 – Japan – Amagasaki rail crash: A train derailed on a sharp curve and smashed into an apartment building, killing 107 people and injuring 549. An investigation revealed that the driver (who was among the dead) was speeding because of a slight delay.
- April 26 – Sri Lanka – Polgahawela level crossing collision: A bus tried to beat the train at a level crossing; at least 35 bus passengers died.
- May 19 – Indonesia – A passenger train from Palembang crashed into another passenger train at Bandar Lampung station and derailed. Seven children died and about 200 were injured. Many of the dead were passengers clinging on to the sides of the Palembang train. The Indonesian government began a crackdown on people clinging on to the exteriors of trains as a means of travel.
- June 16 – Russia – Between Zubtsov and Aristovo in Tver Oblast, 27 fuel oil tankers bound from Moscow to Riga derailed at a speed of about 70 km/h (43 mph), causing 300 tonnes of fuel to leak. Six hundred and forty-one metres (2,103 ft) of track was destroyed and the Volga River was contaminated briefly.
- June 21 – Israel – A Beersheba-bound passenger train collided with a coal delivery truck near Revadim, about 40 kilometres (25 mi) south of Tel Aviv. At least seven died and more than 200 were injured.
- July 10 – United States – Anding, Mississippi: Two Canadian National freight trains collided head-on after the northbound train failed to stop at a red light. Both crews died.
- July 10 – United Kingdom – A Romney, Hythe & Dymchurch Railway steam train hit a car driven across a level crossing, killing the train driver.
- July 13 – Pakistan – 2005 Ghotki rail crash: A chain reaction accident caused by one train missing a signal and colliding into another resulted in three trains crashing and over 150 people dead.
- July 26 – Austria – Gramatneusiedl: passenger train of the ÖBB crashed into a cargo train, injuring 13 people.
- July 31 – China – Liaoning, Shenyang: A passenger train from Xi'an to Changchun passed a sabotaged railway signal and collided with a freight train, killing 5 passengers.
- August 1 – Greece – Kilkis: A truck driver was struck and killed by a train on a crossing after ignoring crossing warnings.
- August 2 – United States – Raleigh, North Carolina. Two people were killed after their truck was hit by an Amtrak train.
- August 5 – Canada – Cheakamus River derailment: Nine cars of a Canadian National freight train derailed into the Cheakamus River near Whistler, British Columbia. Forty thousand litres of caustic soda entered the river, killing over 500,000 fish and greatly damaging the surrounding ecosystem.
- September 17 – United States – 2005 Metra Rock Island derailment: A Metra commuter train derailed, killing two and injuring 83.
- October 3 – India – Datia rail crash: 100 died after a train travelling at six times the speed limit derailed.
- October 15 – United States – Texarkana, Arkansas, Union Pacific train rear-ended another train, derailing and puncturing a tank car containing propylene. The leak ignited at a nearby house, causing a massive explosion and subsequent fire. A 1-mile (1.6 km) radius was evacuated, and one resident was killed.
- October 23 – Italy – Eurostar 9410 derailment: Eurostar Italia train 9410, running from Taranto to Milan, derailed between Acquaviva delle Fonti and Sannicandro di Bari after subsidence due to heavy rain caused a bridge to collapse under it, leaving two bare rails spanning the 12-metre-deep ravine. The train completed the crossing and came to rest with its rear end suspended over the void.
- October 29 – India – Veligonda train disaster: At least 114 people died and many more were injured after part of the track was swept away by a flood, causing a train to derail.
- November 23 – Turkey – A train hit a truck on a level crossing between Tarsus and Mersin, killing nine people and injuring 18.
- November 29 – Democratic Republic of Congo – Kindu rail accident: Over 60 people were swept off the roof of a train by the beams of a bridge in Maniema province.
- December 19 – Poland – Świnna rail crash: After losing braking power in EN57-840 EMU operating as passenger train from Sucha Beskidzka to Żywiec, train crews managed to stage a controlled collision with another train in Świnna, Silesian Voivodeship. Eight people were injured.
- December 25 – Japan – Shonai, Yamagata: All six cars of Akita–Niigata Inaho express train derailed and three passenger cars were crushed, killing five people and injuring 32. Strong winter winds were thought to be the cause.

== 2006 ==
- January 5 - United States - In Quantico, Virginia, a Virginia Railway Express train No. 304, derailed at Possum Point, 4 people were injured.
- January 23 – Montenegro (then within Serbia and Montenegro) – Bioče train disaster: A passenger train crashed into a ravine near Podgorica, killing 46 people and injuring 198.
- January 29 – Pakistan – A broken rail caused a derailment near Jhelum in Punjab, killing 2 people and injuring 29. Poor maintenance was officially being cited as cause; sabotage was suspected by some authorities. The government inquiry later blamed defective and aging rails.
- March 13 – United States – Austin, Texas: Tara Rose McAvoy, the reigning Miss Deaf Texas, was killed by the snowplow on a 65-car Union Pacific freight train while trespassing on the tracks and text-messaging her parents.
- April 15 – Indonesia – In Gubug, 13 people died and 26 were injured after two eastbound trains collided and wreckage fell into a paddy field.
- April 28 – Australia – Victoria: A V/Line VLocity high-speed train derailed after being struck by an 18-wheeler truck, killing two people and injuring 28 on the Ballarat-to-Ararat line.
- May 17 – Switzerland – An engineering train suffered a brake failure and crashes at Thun. Three people are killed.
- June 12 – Israel – Netanya: A passenger train from Tel Aviv to Haifa derailed after colliding with a lorry on a level crossing, killing 5 people and injuring more than 100.
- June 14 – United States – Kismet, California. Two BNSF freight trains collided head-on due to one of the trains running a red signal, injuring 5 people. A crew from the train that ran the red was suspected to be high on cocaine.
- July 1 – United States – Abington, Pennsylvania. Two SEPTA Regional Rail passenger trains collided on a single track on the Warminster Line, injuring 36.
- July 3 – Spain – Valencia Metro derailment: A Valencia Metro train derailed after leaving Jesús station, killing 41 people and injuring at least 47. The records of the train's black box showed that the train passed a bend at 80 km/h, above the speed limit of 40 km/h.
- August 21 – Egypt – Qalyoub train collision – Two trains collided in Qalyoub, 12 miles (19 km) north of Cairo, killing 57 people and injuring 128.
- August 21 – Spain – A speeding RENFE intercity train derailed in Villada, 40 km west of Palencia, killing six people and injuring 36.
- August 27 – Zimbabwe – Five people died in a head-on collision between a passenger train and a freight train 30 km south of Victoria Falls.
- September 4 – Egypt – A passenger train collided with a freight train north of Cairo, killing five people and injuring 30.
- September 5 – Netherlands – A diesel locomotive passed a red signal and collided with a passenger train at Amersfoort, injuring 17.
- September 22 – Germany – Lathen train collision: 21 passengers and two maintenance workers died and many more were injured after a Transrapid train collides with a maintenance of way vehicle on the system's test track near the Netherlands border.
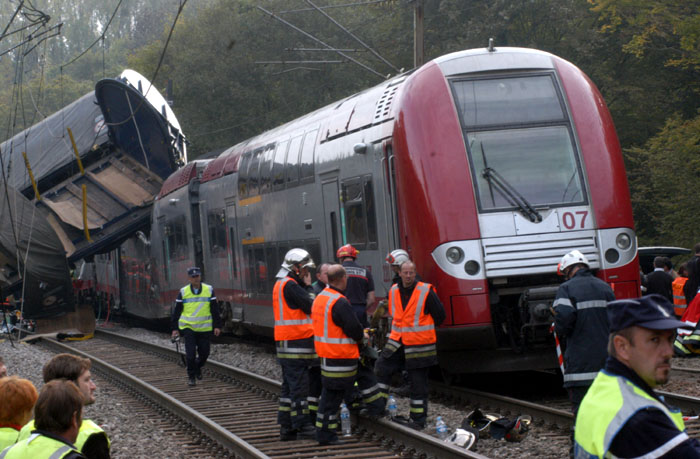
- Zoufftgen
  October 11 – France – Zoufftgen train collision: A Passenger and freight train collided head-on at Zoufftgen, Moselle, close to the Luxembourg border. Five people died, including the drivers of both trains, and 20 were injured. The accident is ascribed to human error in the controlling signalling centre in Luxembourg.
- October 17 – Italy – 2006 Rome metro crash: Two metro trains collided at Rome's Vittorio Emanuele metro station, killing one person and injuring around 60.
- October 20 – United States – New Brighton, Pennsylvania: A Norfolk Southern unit train of DOT-111 tank cars containing ethanol derailed on a bridge over the Beaver River. The resulting fire burned for days and forced evacuations.
- November 9 – United States – Baxter, California: Six cars of a runaway maintenance train derailed, killing two of the crew.
- November 13 – South Africa – Faure level crossing accident: A Metrorail train smashed into a truck carrying farm workers at a level crossing, killing 27 people.
- November 20 – India – 2006 West Bengal train explosion: A train traveling between New Jalpaiguri and Haldiburi in West Bengal exploded, killing five people and injuring 25 to 66. Terrorism was suspected.
- November 24 – Croatia – Drniš: HŽ ICN tilting train number 521 collided with a lorry loaded with Knauf cement boards at a railroad crossing with no ramp or warning lights. The train engineer died instantly, the lorry driver sustained severe injuries.
- November 30 – United States – North Baltimore, Ohio: 15 cars carrying steel derailed after the train inadvertently switched to a side track. These cars then struck a coal train on a parallel set of tracks, causing four of its cars to derail. Three people who were in vehicles waiting for the train to pass were injured.
- December 1 – India – Bihar, Bhágalpur: In the Ganges, a portion of the 150-year-old 'Ulta Pul' bridge being dismantled collapsed over a passing train of India's Eastern Railways, killing 35 people and injuring 17.
- December 13 – Italy – Avio: A freight train operated by Trenitalia passed a red signal and crashed into a freight train of the private company Rail Traction Company. Two Trenitalia engineers died.

== 2007 ==
- January 4 – Turkey – A freight train crashed into a truck carrying farm workers at a railroad crossing in Hatay Province, killing 7 people and injuring 19.
- January 16 – United States – Brooks derailment: A CSX freight train derailed in Brooks, Kentucky.
- January 16 – Indonesia – The Senja Bengawan train derailed in Pager Bridge, Brebes, Central Java. One of the car fell into the Pager River, killing five people.
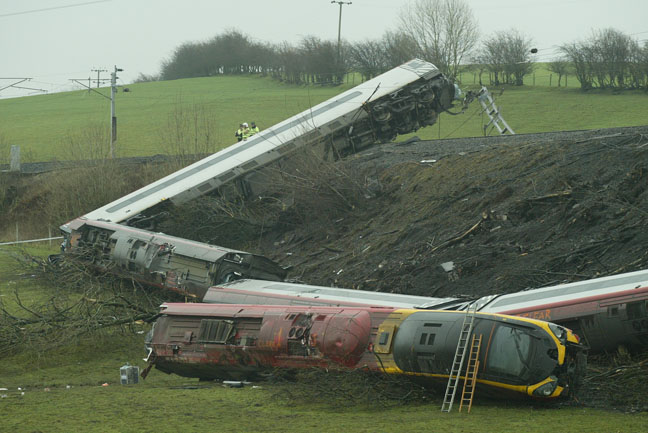
- Grayrigg
  February 23 – United Kingdom – Grayrigg derailment: A Virgin Trains West Coast Pendolino service from London Euston to Glasgow Central derailed at Grayrigg Cottage near Oxenholme, Cumbria, United Kingdom, killing a woman.
- February 28 – China – Strong winds blew 10 passenger rail cars off the track near Turpan, killing 3 passengers and seriously injuring two.
- June 5 – Australia – Kerang train accident: A B-Double truck collided with a Melbourne-bound passenger train 6 kilometres (3.7 mi) north of Kerang at the Murray Valley Highway level crossing, killing 11 train passengers and injuring 23.
- June 14 – Croatia – A Croatian Railways commuter train bound from Zagreb to Karlovac collided with a lorry on the railroad crossing in Demerje, killing the lorry driver and the train engineer. The crash was caused by the lorry driver who ignored light and bell warnings about the train. The train conductor sustained minor injuries.
- June 15 – Italy – Two trains collided on Sardinia, killing three.
- July 16–17 – United States – Two Amtrak Silver Star trains on the Tampa to Miami route crashed into automobiles and derailed in two separate instances, one in Lakeland and one in Plant City. Four people in the automobile died in the first wreck; one in the automobile died in the second accident.
- July 16 – Ukraine – Fifteen carriages from a train carrying yellow phosphorus derailed and caught fire, releasing toxic fumes that affected 14 villages in a 90 km^{2} (35 sq mi) area near Lviv.
- August 1 – Democratic Republic of the Congo – Benaleka train accident: A passenger train derailed killing about 100 people and injuring more than 200 others, many riding on the roof in Kasai-Occidental province, due to brake failure.
- August 24 – Serbia – Two persons died and five were injured after a locomotive and a freight train collided near Čortanovci.
- August 30 – Brazil – 2007 Rio de Janeiro train collision: Eight passengers died and 80 were injured after a commuter train collided with an empty train at Nova Iguaçu near Rio de Janeiro.
- October 2 - United States - In D.C., Virginia, two United States Capitol subway system trains collided onto each other after a train failed to slow down when it reached the end of the line, no deaths were reported but 1 person was injured.
- October 10 – United States – A CSX train Q380-09 carrying ethanol and butane derailed in Painesville and Painesville Township, Ohio, causing an evacuation and fire that burned for several days.
- October 22 – United States – A Vermont Railway train carrying gasoline derailed in Middlebury, Vermont, causing an evacuation. At least one car caught fire and several others leaked gasoline into Otter Creek (Vermont).
- October 25 – Sweden – A 15-year-old boy died after he was struck by a high-speed train in Solna while illegally crossing the railway.
- October 29 – United States – Two BNSF trains derailed in Clara City, Minnesota, causing a hydrochloric acid spill that prompted the evacuation of about 350 people.
- November 9 – United States – An improperly secured free-rolling cut of hoppers from a CSX train in Bennington Yard in the District of Columbia rolled onto an out-of-service bridge, which collapsed and dumped ten rail cars of coal in the Anacostia River.
- November 30 – United States – Amtrak train No. 371, the Pere Marquette, struck the last car of COFC freight train on the Norfolk Southern (ex-PRR) line near 65th Street in Chicago. Two people in the cab of P42DC No. 8 were injured, and many passengers on the other train were injured, including three critically. The engineer was running at approximately 40 mph (64 km/h) in a 15 mph (24 km/h) zone due to confusion about the meaning of a signal.
- December 10 – China – Beijing, Daxing: Between Beijing–Shanghai railway Huangtupo and Huangcun, a workman clearing snow was hit and killed by the K215 passenger train from Beijing to Tumen.
- December 19 – Pakistan – Mehrabpur derailment – A crowded passenger express train derailed down an embankment 200 kilometres (120 mi) north-east of Karachi near Mehrabpur, killing 35 people and injuring about 269, 10 critically.

== 2008 ==
- February 1st – United Kingdom – Barrow upon Soar rail crash – Seven were injured after a East Midlands Trains Class 158 Sprinter collided with a fallen footbridge and derailed 450 metres north of Barrow-upon-Soar railway station in Barrow upon Soar, Leicestershire whilst travelling at 105 km/h (65 mph).
- February 5 – United States – Two people died and one was injured in a chain reaction accident involving six vehicles and a 50-car train at a fog-obscured rail crossing in Boswell, about 30 miles (48 km) west of Lafayette, Indiana.
- February 28 – Bulgaria – Sofia – Kardam train fire – Nine people died in a fire on board Bulgarian State Railways train No.2637 travelling from Sofia to Kardam, which started in a couchette carriage as the train entered Cherven bryag, and spread to a sleeping coach with 27 people. The fire took more than three hours to extinguish. Among the victims was Rasho Rashev, the director of Bulgaria's National Archaeological Institute.
- March 8 – Greece – An Alexandroupolis-bound InterCity train derailed 2 kilometres (1.2 mi) outside Larissa, injuring 28 passengers. Initial reports suggested the station master failed to change the points after a previous train had passed through the station, causing five carriages from the passenger train to derail.
- March 9 – Argentina – A Ferrobaires passenger train going from Buenos Aires to Mar del Plata struck an El Rápido Argentino bus going from Mar de Ajó to San Miguel (Greater Buenos Aires) at a crossing on the outskirts of Dolores, Buenos Aires Province. The bus had disregarded the active warning devices on the railroad crossing of Provincial Highway 63. Seventeen people died, 40 were injured.
- March 25 – United States – A MBTA train crashed into a runaway box car at Canton Junction station in Canton, Massachusetts, injuring 150 people on board.
- April 9 – Malaysia – A Sabah State Railway train plunged 10 metres into Padas River after a derailment caused by a landslide near Tenom, killing two passengers.
- April 14 – Czech Republic – In Ostrava, two trams collided head-on, killing three people and injuring 40.
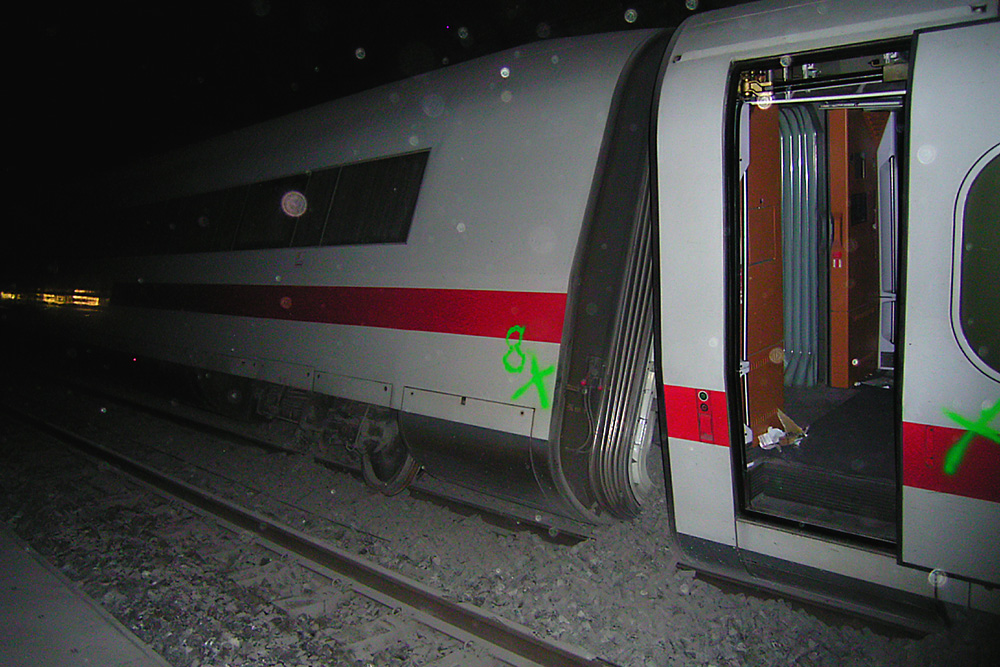
- Landrückentunnel crash
  April 26 – Germany – An InterCityExpress train ran into a herd of sheep that had wandered onto the tracks at the mouth of the Landrückentunnel, Germany's longest rail tunnel, on the Hanover-Würzburg high-speed rail line near Fulda. The derailed train stopped 1,300 metres (4,300 ft) into the tunnel. Twenty-two people were injured seriously, including the engineer, 17 were slightly injured and 77 sheep died.
- April 28 – China – Zibo train collision: Train No. T195 en route from Beijing to Qingdao derailed at a section of temporary detour tracks Zhoucun-Wangcun, Hejiacun, on the outskirts of Zibo, Shandong. It was then struck by the No. 5034 (Yantai to Xuzhou) passenger train. Fourteen passenger cars were crushed, 72 people died and 416 were injured.
- May 5 – Sudan – A freight train carrying illegal passengers and Kordofan University students derailed on the outskirts of Al-Foula, South Kordofan, killing 14 and injuring 28.
- May 10 – Romania – The locomotive and three cars of Romanian National Railway Company (CFR) passenger train No 1661 going from Bucharest to Iași derailed at a defective switch near Valea Calugareasca station in Prahova County. A 17-year-old girl was killed and four others were injured.
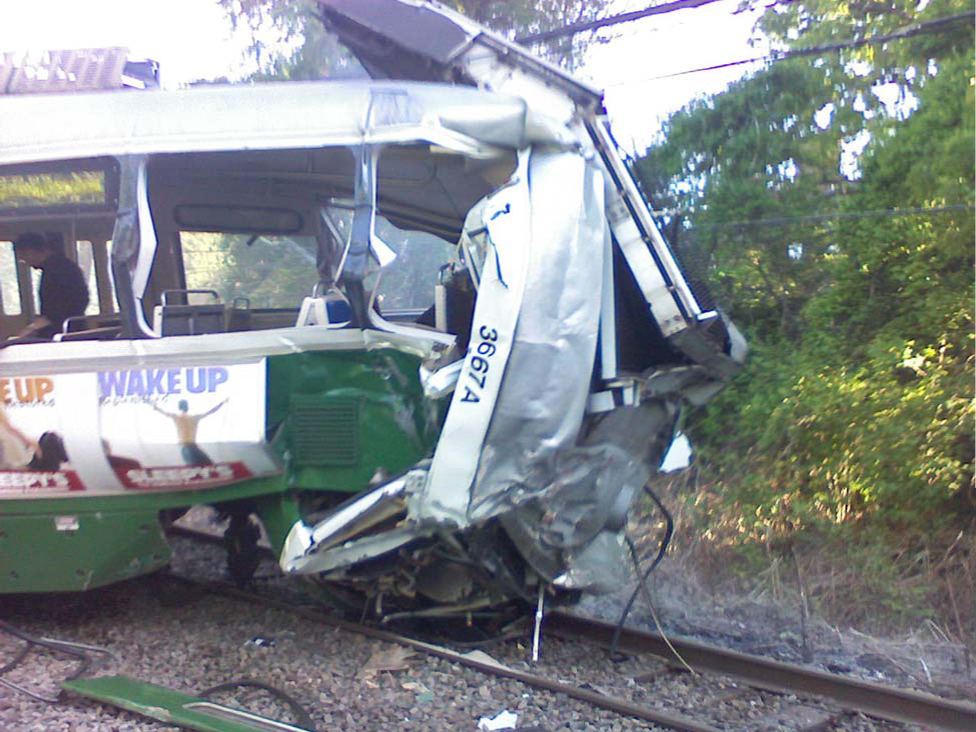
- Newton
  May 28 – United States – 2008 Massachusetts train collision: Boston MBTA Green Line D Train rear-ended another train in Newton, Massachusetts, between Woodland and Waban "T" stops. The driver of the rear train was killed while 12 others were injured.
- July 3 – Belgium – A passenger train and a freight train collided, injuring 42 people, two seriously.
- July 16 – Egypt – At least 44 people were killed and 33 injured after a truck failed to stop at level crossing and pushed two vehicles into a Matruh–Alexandria passenger train, at El Dabaa, Marsa Matruh.
- August 8 – Czech Republic – 2008 Studénka train wreck: Express train EC 108 Comenius from Kraków, Poland to Prague travelling at 140 km/h crashed into a section of a bridge undergoing construction that had fallen onto the track, killing eight people and injuring 91.
- September 11 – United Kingdom-France – 2008 Channel Tunnel fire: A Eurotunnel Shuttle train carrying two vans and 25 lorries was severely damaged after a fire starts on one of the lorries. Six people were injured slightly, the part of the Channel Tunnel where the train came to rest was closed for repairs until February 2009.
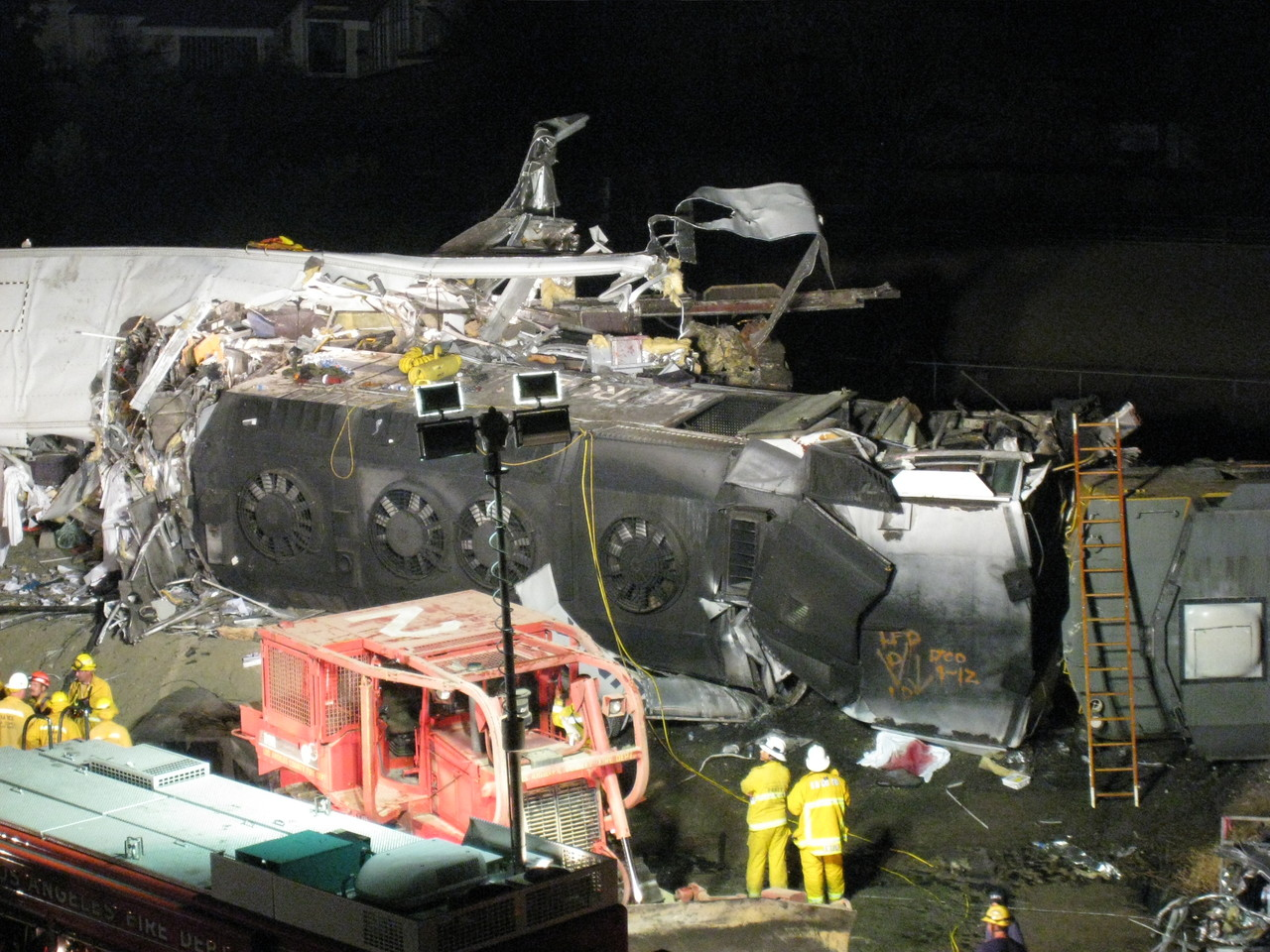
- Chatsworth
  September 12 – United States – 2008 Chatsworth train collision: A northbound Metrolink (California) double-deck commuter train ran a red light and collided head-on with a Union Pacific Railroad freight train pulled by three engines at about 60 mph (97 km/h) and derailed; the derailed Metrolink engine was knocked 30 feet (9.1 m) backwards into a passenger car, crushing it in half. Twenty-five people were killed and about 135 were injured. This incident intensified the debate Congress was considering to mandate a safety system called positive train control, which passed Congress, and was signed into law, just over 30 days after this incident.
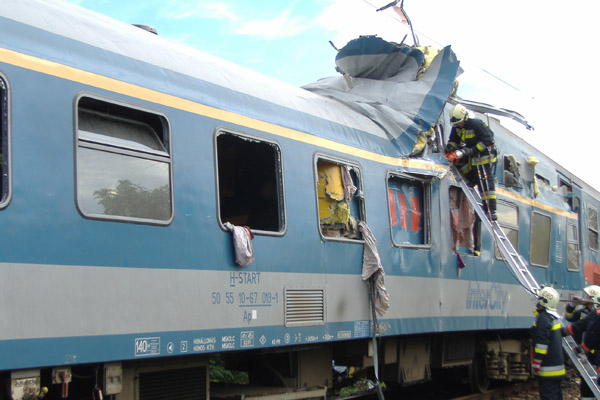
- Monorierdő train collision
  October 6 – Hungary – Monorierdő train collision: Four people died and 26 were injured in a collision between two passenger trains near Budapest.
- October 14 – United States – A CSX train derailed in Decatur, Alabama, killing its conductor.
- November 18 – Australia – A Connex Melbourne express train collides with a car in Dandenong South, killing the car's occupant.
- November 27 – Australia – Two people died and several others were injured after a QR Tilt Train collided with a truck on the Bruce Highway level crossing about 20 km south of Cardwell, Queensland.
- December 23 – Latvia – A fuel cargo train crashed into a stationary train in Ventspils. Ten fuel tankers caught fire, killing two people.
- December 31 – Canada – Thirty-three cars of a Canadian National Railway freight train running from Toronto to Moncton derailed in Villeroy, Quebec. One car leaked propane, causing the evacuation of about 70 residents.

== 2009 ==
- January 1 – Australia – One person was killed and six others injured after a QR Sunlander train collided with a garbage truck at a level crossing with no boom gates or warning lights near Innisfail, Queensland.
- February 7 – Cuba – Three people were killed and more than 90 injured in a collision between two passenger trains in Camagüey, 570 kilometres (350 mi) east of Havana.
- February 13 - India - In Orissa, a Coromandel Express train caught fire after leaving Jaipur Road Train Station, killing 15 people and injuring dozens.
- February 13 – India – Jajpur derailment: 12 carriages of the Howrah-Madras Express derailed after the train left Jajpur Road station near Bhubaneswar in Odisha, killing nine people and injuring 250.
- February 21 – Slovakia – Brezno train accident: Eleven people died in a collision between a bus and a train on a level crossing near Brezno.
- March 29 – Tanzania – Equipment breakdown and culpability causes a rear-end collision in Gulwe–Igandu section (Mpwapwa District), killing dozens of passengers and injuring many others.
- April 17 – Germany – A passenger train collided with a freight train in Berlin, injuring 12 people.
- April 28 – United States – In Boston, a T-Trolley train derailed due to the driver looking at text messages, injuring 68 people.
- April 29 - India - In Vyasarpadi Jeeva, a MEMU train collided with an empty goods tanker at Vyasarpadi Jeeva Station following a hijack, 4 were killed and several others were injured.
- June 1- United States – In Louisville, Kentucky, a train derailed at a curve in Louisville Zoo, injuring 22 people.
- June 5 -Canada - In Oshawa, a freight train derailed and exploded, sending toxic chemicals in the air, no casualties were reported, but hundreds of residents in nearby areas were evacuated.
- June 19 – United States – A major downpour in Rockford, Illinois, caused 14 ethanol tankers of a Canadian National freight train to derail and explode into flames. One person at a rail crossing died, several others were burned.
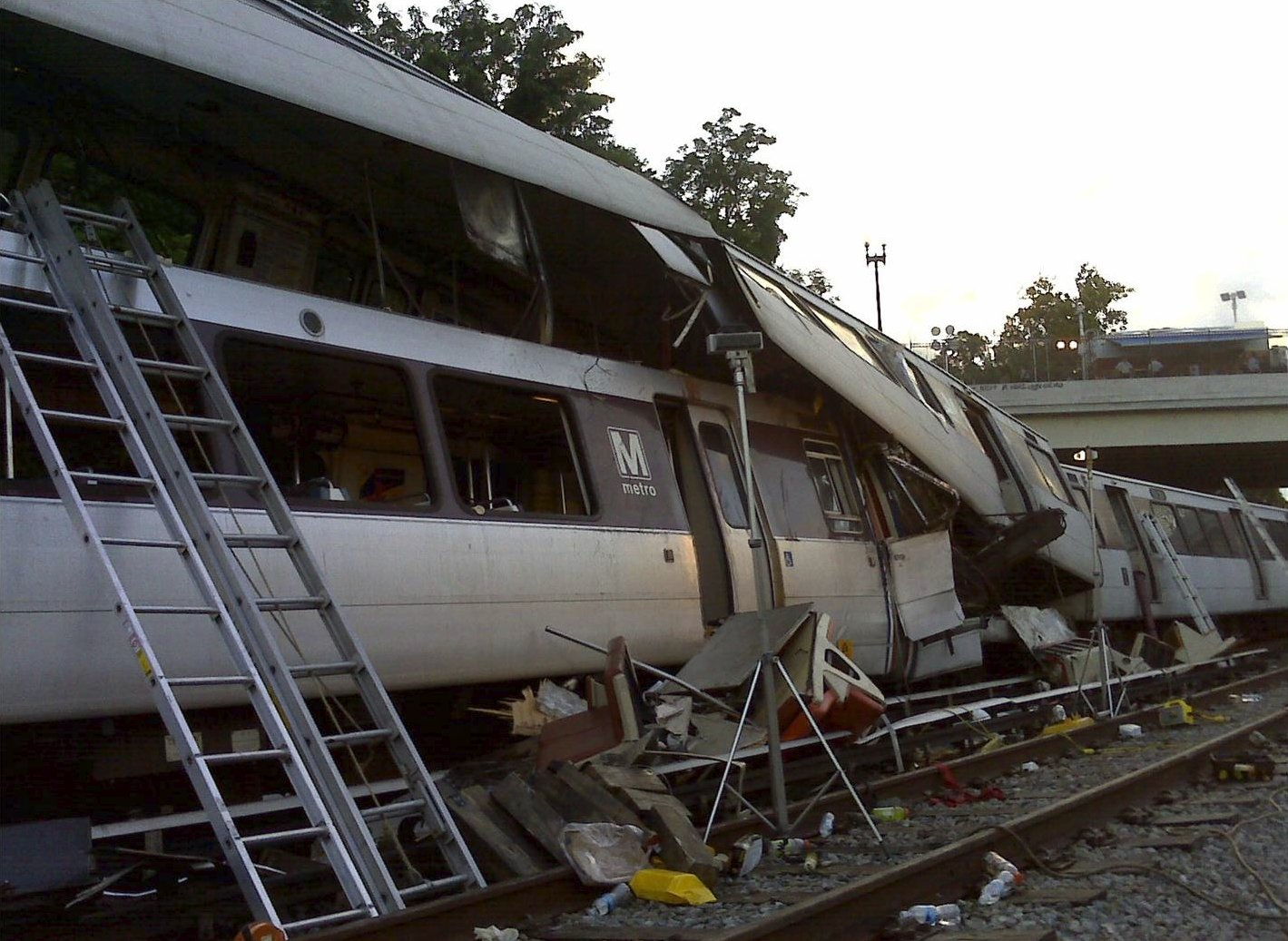
- June 2009 Washington Metro train collision
  June 22 – United States – June 2009 Washington Metro train collision – On the Washington Metro, an electronic track-circuit module failed, causing a train to go undetected by the automatic train control system. A second train crashed into it, killing nine people, the deadliest incident in the subway system's 33-year history.
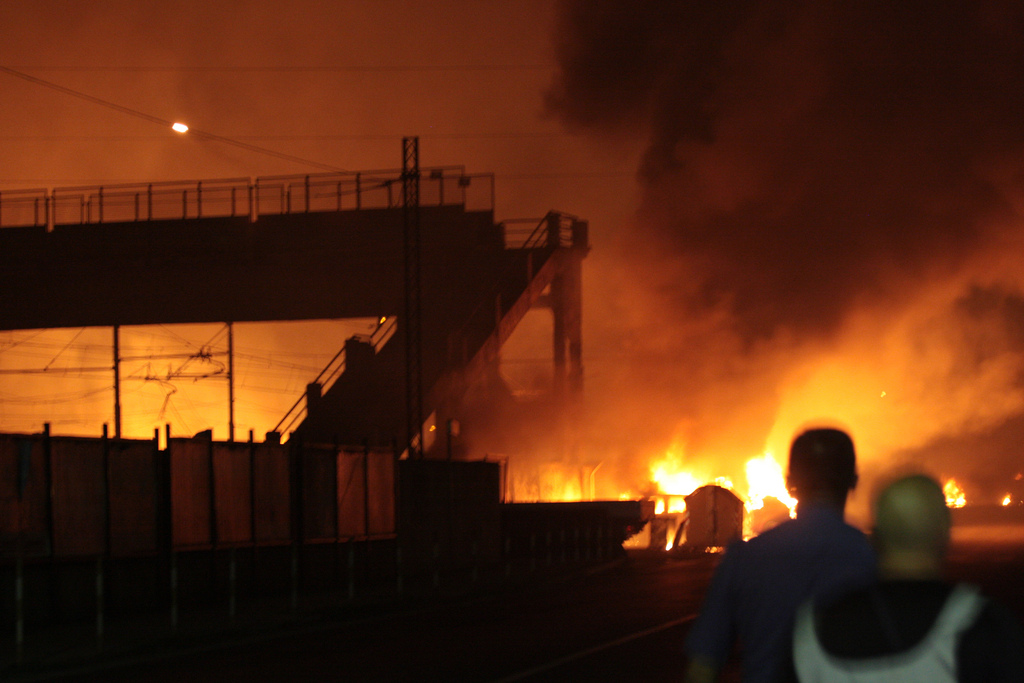
- Viareggio train derailment
  June 29 – Italy – Viareggio train derailment: A freight train derailed at Viareggio. Two wagons carrying liquefied petroleum gas then exploded, killing 32, including five after a house collapsed.
- June 29 – China – Chenzhou train collision: Two passenger trains collided at Chenzhou railway station, Hunan Province, killing three people and injuring 63.
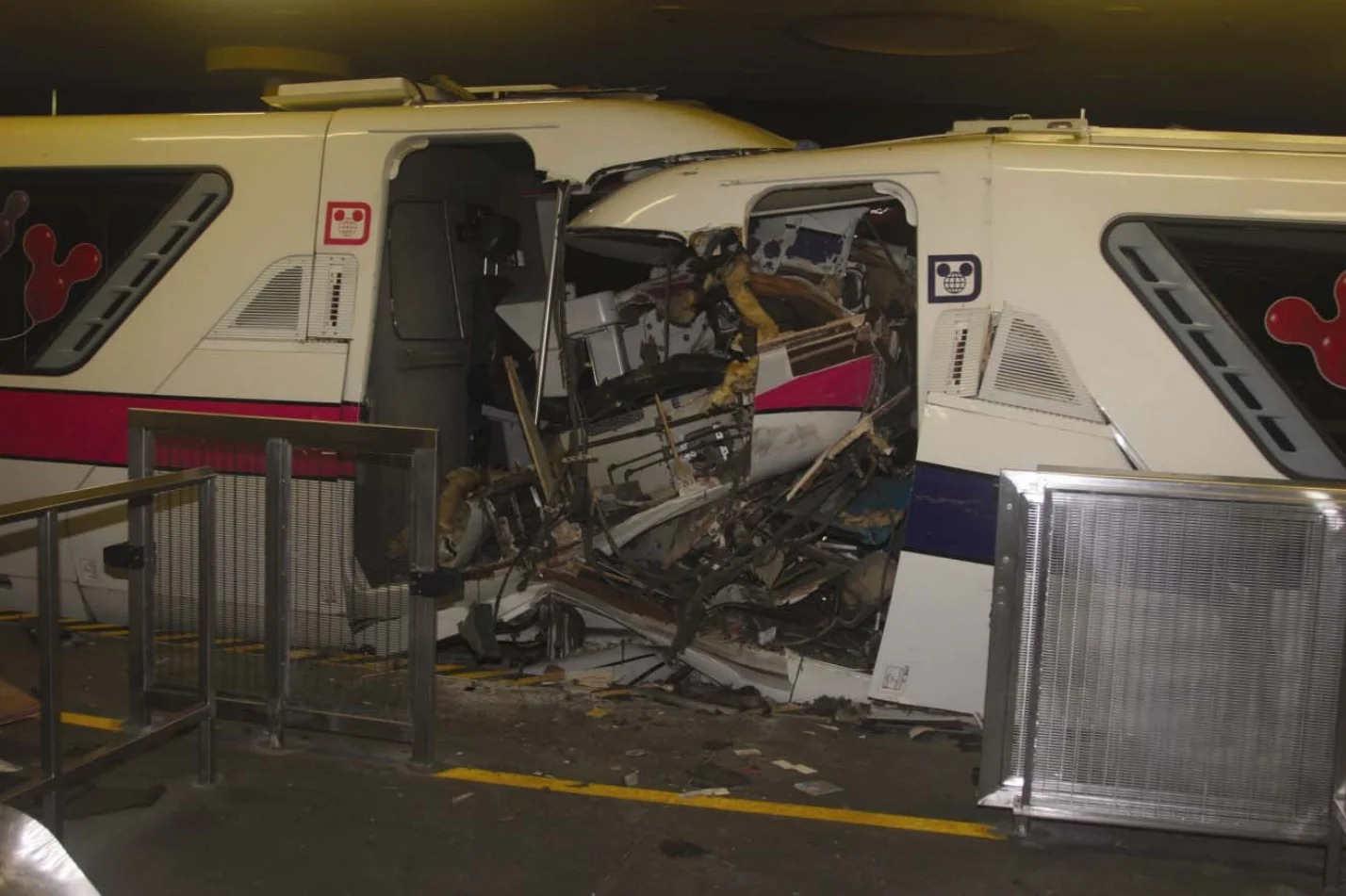
- 2009 Walt Disney World monorail accident
  July 5 – United States – 2009 Walt Disney World monorail accident: Two monorails at Walt Disney World collided, killing the driver and injuring seven others. The cause was found to be human error on behalf of the driver and dispatcher.
- July 9 – United States – The Amtrak Wolverine hit the side of a car in Canton Township, Michigan, near Detroit. All five car occupants died.
- July 18 – United States – In San Francisco, a Muni Metro Train collided rear end onto another train stopped at West Portal Train Station, injuring 47 people.
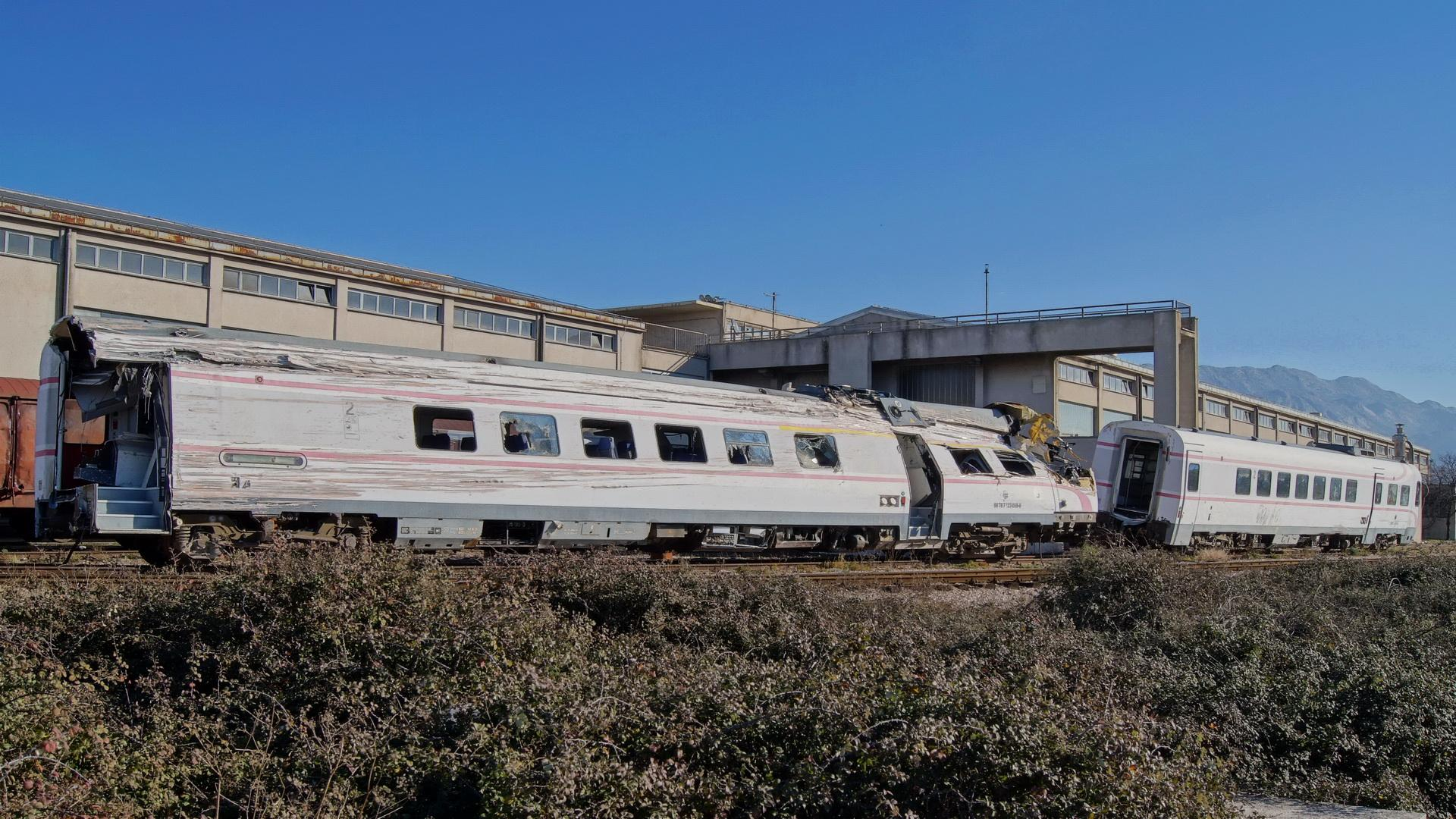
- Rudine (aftermath)
  July 24 – Croatia – Rudine derailment – HŽ ICN tilting train number 521 bound from Zagreb to Split derailed between Labin Dalmatinski and Kaštel Stari near the village of Rudine. Six passengers died and 55 were injured, 13 of them seriously. The crash was caused by retardant that was sprayed on the railroad approximately 10 minutes before the accident, leaving the track surface slippery and preventing braking. Thirty minutes later, a rescue train experienced the same problem and derails on the very same spot but did not produce further casualties despite colliding with the derailed wreckage.
- July 29 – China – A train derailed due to a landslide in Liucheng County, Guangxi, killing four people and injuring 71.
- August 28 – Cameroon – A freight train carrying fuel derailed south of Yaoundé and caught fire, killing one.
- August 30 – Cameroon – A passenger train derailed near Yaoundé, killing five and injuring 275.
- September 12 – Germany – Friedewald train collision – Two steam trains collided head-on on the Lößnitzgrundbahn.
- September 16 – Ireland – A tram and bus collided in Dublin injuring 21 people.
- September 24 – Netherlands – Barendrecht train accident – Two freight trains collided head-on below a viaduct on the A15 motorway near Barendrecht, killing a train driver. Derailed sections landed on a parallel track as a passenger train approached. A few passengers of the passenger train were lightly injured.
- October 5 – Thailand – A passenger train derailed during heavy rain in Hua Hin District, killing at least seven people and injuring dozens.
- October 20 – India – Mathura train collision – A passenger train collision near Mathura.
- October 23 – India – A huge concrete slab fell down into a train in north-east Mumbai, killing the driver and a passenger. Twelve others were injured.
- October 24 – Egypt – 2009 El Ayyat railway accident – A passenger train stopped after striking water buffalo in the El Ayyat area of Giza. Another passenger train then rear-ended the stationary train, killing at least 18 people.
- November 4 – Pakistan – At least 18 people died after the Allama Iqbal Express collided head-on with a goods train near Juma Goth Station in the suburbs of Karachi.
- December 21 – Croatia – A HŽ commuter train number 5100 bound from Sisak Caprag to Zagreb failed to stop and crashes into the platform bumper at Zagreb Glavni Kolodvor in Zagreb at 15–20 km/h. The cause was blamed on the lack of antifreeze fluid in the locomotive's braking system which froze due to low temperatures. Sixty people from the train, including its engineer, were injured, seven of them seriously.

== See also ==
- Classification of railway accidents
- List of accidents and disasters by death toll
- Lists of traffic collisions – includes level crossing accidents
- List of traffic collisions (2000–present)
- List of level crossing crashes
- List of rail accidents in the United Kingdom
- List of railway accidents and incidents in India
- List of Russian rail accidents
- Lists of rail accidents by country
- List of years in rail transport
- 2006 in rail transport
- Tram accident
- Federal Employers Liability Act
