= News 24 =

News 24 may refer to:

- News 24 (Albania), a 24-hour news television channel in Albania
- News24 (website), a South Africa-based news website owned by Naspers
- Rai News24, a 24-hour news television channel in Italy
- BBC News 24, now known as BBC News, a UK 24-hour news television channel
- TVNZ News 24, the working title of a New Zealand TV channel launched as TVNZ 7
- News24 (Australian TV channel), formerly known as Sky News Australia
- News24 (Bangladeshi TV channel), a national news channel of Bangladesh
- News24 (Indian TV channel), a national news channel of India
- News 24 (Nepali TV channel), airs on the Nepal Broadcasting Channel (NBC)
- NTV News24, a Japanese news channel

== See also ==
- ABC News Channel, an Australian 24-hour news channel operated by the Australian Broadcasting Corporation, formerly known as ABC News 24
- i24NEWS, an international news channel
