= Nagpur level crossing disaster =

2005 level crossing accident in India

- Location of Maharashtra state in India

Details
- Date: 3 February 2005
- Location: Maharashtra
- Country: India

Statistics
- Deaths: 58

The Nagpur level crossing disaster was an accident that occurred on 3 February 2005, when a crowded trailer being towed by a tractor was hit by a train near the village of Kanan, 20 km from Nagpur in Maharashtra, India, causing 58 fatalities.

== Overview ==
The accident happened on an isolated, unstaffed level crossing, when a wedding party of 70 people was being transported to the ceremony on a trailer being towed by a tractor. The crossing had no attendant or barriers. The locomotive struck the trailer and stopped just after the crossing, the crumpled trailer still underneath it, and passengers provided what assistance they could until emergency services arrived. 58 people died in the crash or in the days following, and the surviving members of the party were all critically injured. The dead included at least 30 women and 18 children. No train passengers suffered more than minor injuries or shock.

== Aftermath ==
The tragedy was one of a series of multiple-casualty accidents on India's overcrowded and undermaintained railway system, and resulted in demands that Transport Minister Laloo Prasad Yadav resign. The director of the South East Central Railway commented that no gate was installed at the rail crossing due to the low frequency of trains on the route, while assuring that it would look into the matter.

== See also ==
- List of level crossing accidents
- List of rail accidents (2000–09)
- List of road accidents
