= Vadodara train crash =

2005 railway incident in India

Coordinates: 22.48°N 73.30°E

The Vadodara train crash occurred on 21 April 2005 at the village of Samlaya near Vadodara in Gujarat when the Sabarmati Express passenger train crashed at high speed into a stationary goods train carrying cement.

The passenger train was carrying over 430 passengers to holy city of Varanasi, when at 3.30am it collided with the cement train which was on the same track. Local citizens rushed to help pull survivors from the wreckage, which did not catch fire. They were joined later in the day by soldiers armed with cutting equipment as well as police and medical personnel.

Initial reports claimed that 24 people had been killed in the crash, but these were subsequently scaled down to 17 or 18, with at least 80 people seriously injured and requiring hospitalisation. The railway authority authorised a payment of 100,000 rupees to the families of the dead, and other provisions for those less injured.

The cause of the crash was apparently the train's failure to stop at a signal warning the driver that there was an obstacle on the track ahead. The driver, Sita Ram, was killed in the crash, so his testimony will never be known, but the schools of thought on the cause of the crash are that either the driver did not see or did not pay attention to the signal, or that the signalman in Samlaya failed to produce the signal, or finally that the wiring from the box to the signal was faulty, thus mislaying the message.

The manager of the rail line concerned, M. Z. Ansari provoked controversy, by declaring just a few hours after the crash that "Prima facie the accident appears to have been caused by human error on the part of the staff at B Cabin in Samlaya", which caused much anger amongst the local people aiding the rescue operations, particularly since Mr Ansari was not at the site, and could not have known the full details of what had caused the crash.

== See also ==
- List of rail accidents (2000–09)
