= NTV News24 =

- Logo used since 2014
- Type: Cable television network
- Country: Japan
- Broadcast area: Worldwide (online)
- Headquarters: Minato, Tokyo

Programming
- Language: Japanese
- Picture format: HDTV 1080i

Ownership
- Owner: CS Nippon Corporation

History
- Launched: 1 October 1987; 39 years ago
- Former names: NTV Cable News (1987-1997); NNN24: NTV Nonstop News (1997-2005)

Links
- Website: www.ntv.co.jp/news24/

NTV News24 (日テレNEWS24) is a Japanese cable and satellite news channel owned by Nippon Television. The channel started broadcasting in 1987 and is the oldest 24-hour news channel in Japan. As of July 2014, 4.4 million households received the channel.

== History ==
Broadcasting began on October 1, 1987 as NCN (NTV Cable News). As of August 1990, NCN was on air for fourteen hours a day (10am to midnight) with updates at 10am, 12pm, 3pm, 6pm and 9pm. On December 1, 1997, it was renamed NNN24, short for "NTV Nonstop News". In January 2000, an adapted website for the I-mode mobile internet service launched. The website amassed 77,000 views on March 8, when a fatal subway crash occurred in Tokyo. By March 2000, it was available in 2.3 million households.

On December 1, 2005, the channel was renamed NTV News24. Simultaneous web broadcasts began on April 18, 2017, however, some programs not produced for the channel, as well as its baseball coverage, were replaced by other programs.

On January 31, 2018, it gained exclusive rights to all Chiba Lotte Marines baseball games.

Due to a corporate change at the start of fiscal 2021, its parent company was transferred from NTV to CS Nippon on April 1, 2021. On October 10, 2023, its website merged with NTV's news site.
