= Monorierdő =

- Village
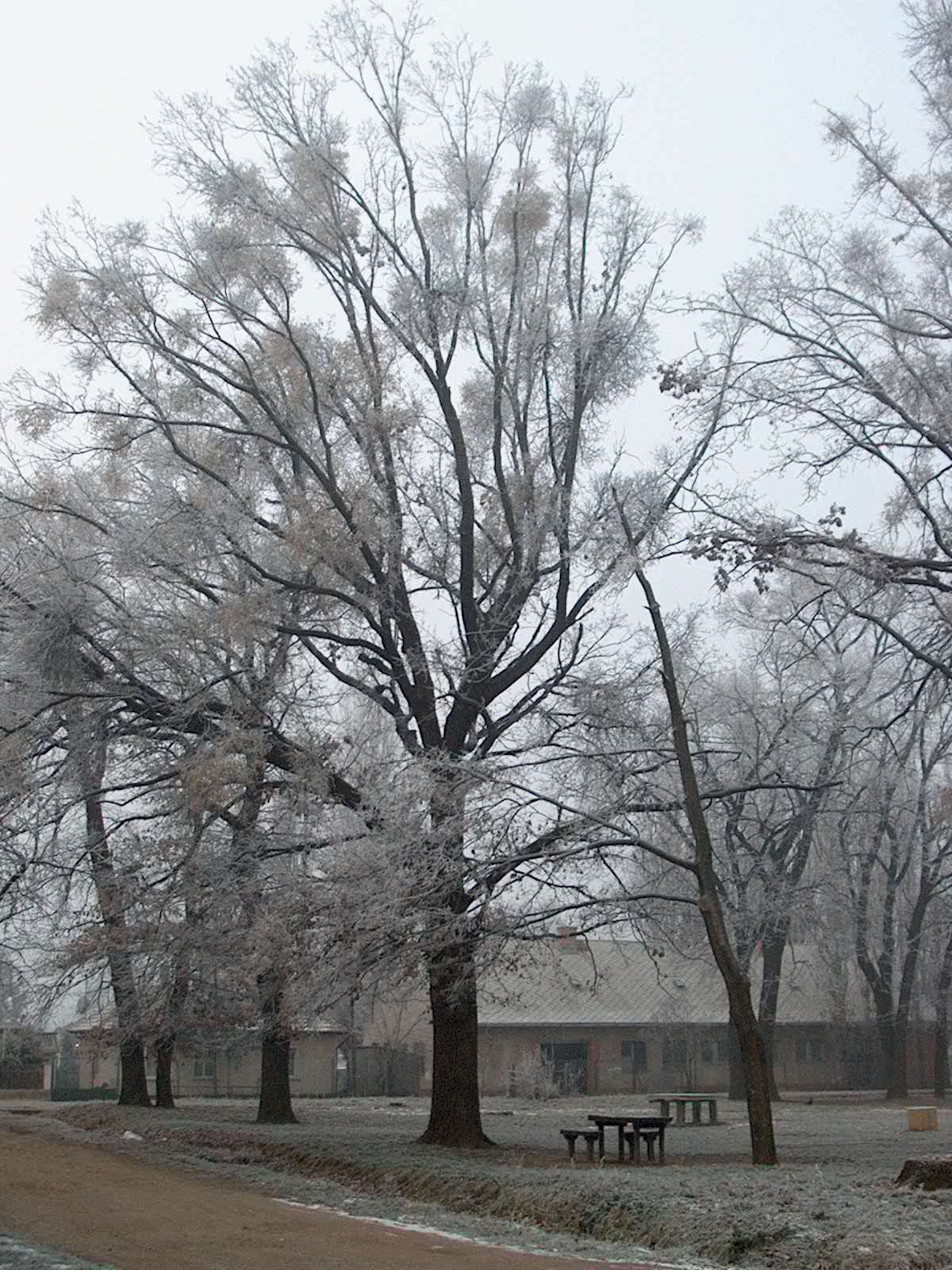

- Flag Coat of arms

- Location of Monorierdő
- Coordinates: 47.30845°N 19.5°E
- Country: Hungary
- Region: Central Hungary
- County: Pest
- District: Monor

Area
  - Total: 15.11 km^{2} (5.83 sq mi)

Population (1 January 2026)
  - Total: 5,194
  - Density: 343.7/km^{2} (890.3/sq mi)
- Time zone: UTC+1 (CET)
  - Summer (DST): UTC+2 (CEST)
- Postal code: 2213
- Area code: (+36) 29
- Website: www.monorierdo.hu

Monorierdő is a village in Pest County, Hungary.

The village was a site of the Monorierdő train collision in 2008.
