= Kølkær Parish =

Parish in Herning Municipality, Denmark

Kølkær Parish Kølkær Sogn
- Parish
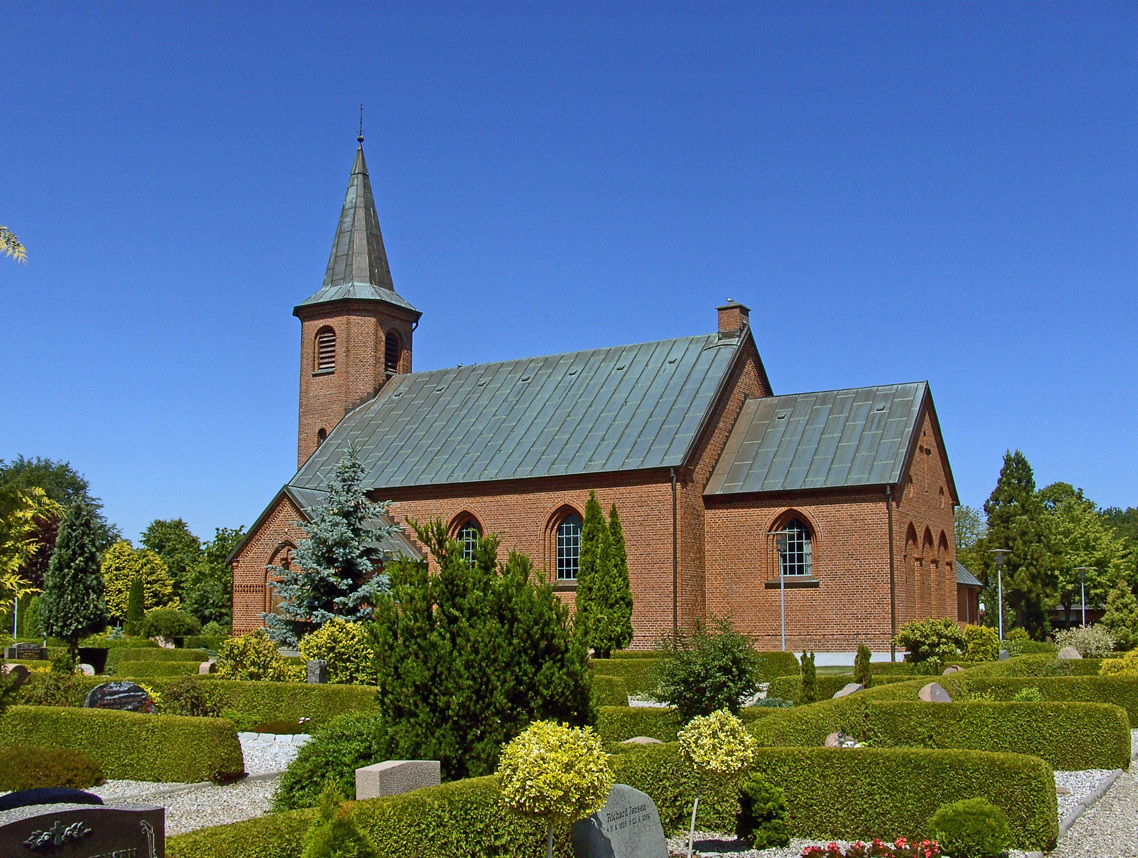
- Kølkær Church
- Interactive map of Kølkær Parish
- Coordinates: 56.06°N 9.08°E
- Country: Denmark
- Region: Central Denmark
- Municipality: Herning Municipality
- Diocese: Viborg

Population (2025)
  - Total: 910
- Parish number: 9119

Kølkær Parish (Danish: Kølkær Sogn) is a parish in the Diocese of Viborg in Herning Municipality, Denmark. The parish contains the town of Kølkær.
