= Pécrot rail crash =

2001 train crash in Belgium

Coordinates: 50°47′00″N 04°39′00″E

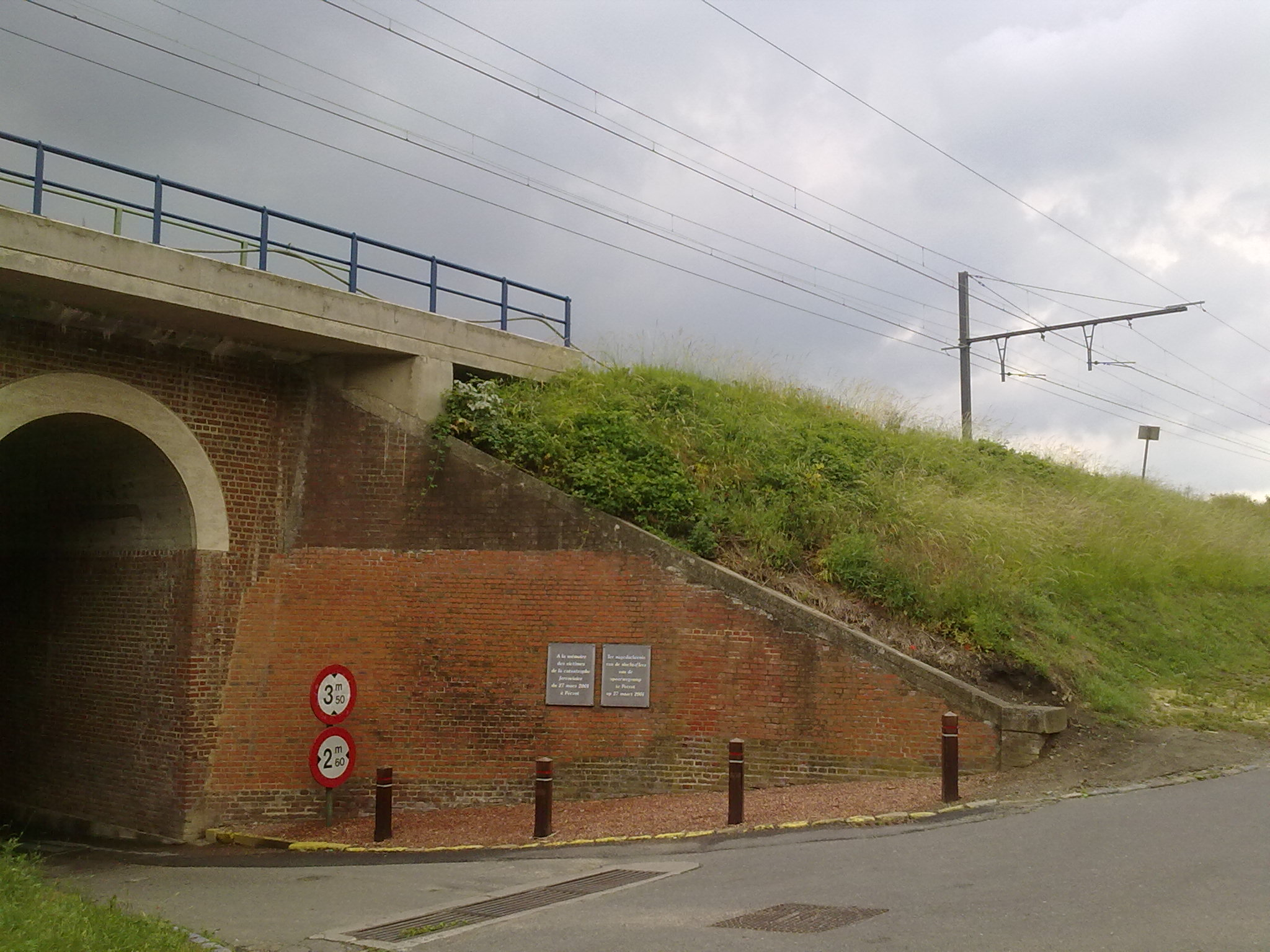
The accident site and the two commemorative plaques.

The Pécrot rail crash was a rail accident in the village of Pécrot (part of the municipality of Grez-Doiceau), Belgium, that occurred on 27 March 2001 when two passenger trains collided head-on. The crash left 8 dead and 12 injured and was Belgium's worst rail disaster in a quarter of a century.

== Timeline of events ==
- 08:41 — In Wavre station, a signalman noticed an empty passenger train departing from Track No. 4 against a red signal, towards Leuven.
- 08:42 — The Wavre signalman contacted the Leuven signalman, to inform him about the train. However, the Wavre signalman spoke only French while the Leuven signalman spoke only Dutch, so the latter did not understand the message fully.
- 08:43 — The Wavre signalman tried to have the overhead wire current cut off on the erroneously departed train's track. Whenever the power on the overhead wire is cut for more than 20 seconds, the train driver is required by operational rules to recognise this as an emergency situation and start a procedure to bring his train to a halt as soon as possible. However, that could not be done from Wavre. The signalman had to contact the Electrical Current Controller in Brussels about the problem.
- 08:46 — The Brussels controller tried to contact the driver of the train, but was unable to reach him. The Brussels controller also tried to contact the driver of a passenger train that had just departed from Leuven towards Wavre, traveling on the same track as the other train, in the opposite direction. Again, the controller failed to reach the driver. The area where the accident happened is quite remote, with heavy vegetation and terrain further impacting train radio reception.
- 08:47 — The overhead wire current was cut off, which is a last resort measure to have all impacted train drivers stop their trains as per the operational rules, but unfortunately too late.
- 08:50 — The two trains collided head-on in the village of Pécrot. 8 people were killed, including both drivers, and 12 were injured.

== Causes ==
The accident had two main causes. The first was the inexperience of the driver of the train which departed from Wavre. The train had stopped with the driver's cab past the signal, so the driver could not see that the signal was red when he departed. The other cause was the language barrier between the signalmen at the Wavre and Leuven cabins. Both French and Dutch are official languages in Belgium, and rail staff were only required to speak one. NMBS/SNCB, the Belgian national railway company, admitted that the accident was caused solely by human error. Judge Philippe Ridelle presided the trial and pronounced the sentence.

== See also ==
- List of railway stations in Belgium
- List of rail accidents (2000–2009)
