= Sofia – Kardam train fire =

2008 train fire in Bulgaria

Sofia - Kardam train fire

Details
- Date: 28 February 2008; 23:40 EST (UTC+02:00)
- Location: Cherven bryag, Bulgaria
- Country: Bulgaria
- Line: Sofia - Varna line
- Operator: BDZ
- Incident type: Fire
- Cause: Under investigation

Statistics
- Trains: 1
- Passengers: 150
- Deaths: 9
- Injured: 10
- Damage: 2 coaches burned

The Sofia – Kardam train fire occurred on 28 February 2008, when the BDZ night train from Sofia to Kardam caught fire at 11:40 pm near the industrial zone of the town of Cherven Bryag, Bulgaria. Nine passengers died and at least ten were injured.

== The train ==
The fire took place on the BDZ InterCity night train (No. 2637) traveling from Sofia to the north-eastern village of Kardam near the Romanian border. The train was intended to stop at Svoge, Mezdra, Pavlikeni, Targovishte and Provadiya. More than 60 people in the two coaches, one of which was a couchette, were affected by the fire. The train was going to travel for the total railway distance of 623 km (387 mi) between Sofia and Kardam.

Some of the theories concerning the start of the fire include a flame (possibly from a discarded cigarette or tobacco pipe), a lit window curtain, accumulated dust over-heating around the radiators, a lighting cable with partially missing rubber or plastic insulation, an incandescent lightbulb left without a safety glass around it, or a tourist's broken gas bottle containing liquefied petroleum under high pressure.

The train was moving at about 100 km/h (62 mph). It is also possible that water for heating the sleeping cabins was initially heated in a common boiler by a wood and coal fire, which was located at one end of the wagon. Additionally, the plastic cover around the two fluorescent lamps that contained tungsten filaments illuminated gas at each end of the cylindrical long lamp and incandescent spherical and transparent safety glass could have been involved in the fire.

== Aftermath ==
The government was initially criticized for not immediately declaring a national day of mourning for the victims. Two days after the crash, President Georgi Parvanov said the government was ready to declare a period of mourning, but only when the circumstances of the crash and the identities of the victims were known. Several days later, the government declared 5 March a national day of mourning.

== See also ==
- List of rail accidents (2000–2009)
- Bulgarian State Railways
