= Karanjadi train crash =

2004 train accident in Maharashtra, India

Details
- Date: 16 June 2004
- Location: Maharashtra
- Country: India

Statistics
- Deaths: 20
- Injured: 100

The Karanjadi train crash was an incident resulting in derailment of a passenger train at Karanjadi, a village in Raigad District of Maharashtra, India, on Wednesday, 16 June 2004. Twenty people were killed and well over 100 injured in the crash, which was the result of heavy monsoon rains.

== Overview ==
At 6:10 am, the Matsyagandha Express passenger train, transporting commuters between Mangalore and Mumbai, was on a section of the Konkan Railway line between Veer and Karanjadi, when the engine ran headlong into the debris of a landslide caused by heavy monsoon rains, which had collapsed part of a hillside across the track, crushing steel nets put there to prevent such a fall. Due to the hilly terrain, the driver was unable to see the obstruction until much too late, and the engine with eleven carriages derailed and fell some way down the hillside and off a bridge.

The same heavy rainfall that caused the crash dampened the wreckage, preventing a possible fire, which could have killed hundreds, as the injured survivors were forced to wait several hours until rescuers could arrive, again thanks to the difficult terrain. The engine had fallen, with the lead carriage off a bridge into a stream, and local people were vital in rescuing those who had fallen in, and saved many lives before emergency services arrived.

The death toll for the crash was initially believed to be 14 dead with 115 injured, but removal of the wreckage uncovered six more bodies underneath. 30 of those injured were critically ill patients being transported to a hospital in Mumbai, although all are thought to have survived the crash. Relatives of the dead were paid ₹10,000 in compensation, slightly less than is normal in such circumstances.

A thorough investigation was ordered, but the cause was straightforward. India has problems with landslides on her railways, as the Vaibhavwadi rail disaster almost exactly a year before shows. In that crash, vital anti-collision devices weren't installed when they should have been, and here too, adequate precautionary measures before the fact might have prevented the crash.

== Similar accidents ==
Landslides can be classed with washaways.

- (New Zealand) – Tangiwai disaster
- (India) – Veligonda train disaster

== See also ==
- List of rail accidents (2000–present)
