= Vaibhavwadi train crash =

2003 train derailment in India

Coordinates: 16°32′24″N 73°40′53″E

The Vaibhavwadi train crash was a fatal train derailment near the village of Vaibhavwadi in Sindhudurg district, Maharashtra in India on 22 June 2003. The final count of the fatalities was 53 and 26 were injured. Families of those killed were given Rs.1 lakh compensation.

== Overview ==
On 22 June 2003, a Holiday Special train of Central Railway, 904 up, from Karwar to Mumbai derailed at 9.15 pm due to large boulders on the track, on the Ratnagiri region of Konkan Railway (KRCL), from a landslide down the ravine's side. The engine and first three carriages were thrown in the air.

The rescue operation was difficult because it was hours before the emergency services arrived. Only the next morning, soldiers and emergency services freed the passengers.

The Konkan Railway Corporation, which developed an Anti Collision Device that has been sold to other Indian and foreign companies had not yet installed it on this train.

== Similar accidents ==
Landslides can be classed with washaways.

- (New Zealand) – Tangiwai disaster
- (India) – Veligonda train disaster
- (India) – Karanjadi train crash
- (Australia) – Bethrungra – 1885 – 7 killed when train derails at culvert washaway.
