= Datia rail crash =

Train accident in India

Coordinates: 25.67°N 78.47°E

The Datia train crash was a railroad crash that occurred on 3 October 2005 involving a passenger train near Datia in India's Madhya Pradesh province. The crash occurred just three weeks before the Veligonda rail disaster which killed 114 people.

The overcrowded Bundelkhand Express from Varanasi to Gwalior was apparently travelling at over six times the legal speed limit, when it overshot a sharp turn near the town of Datia. The engine and six coaches jumped the track and crashed through a signalman's box before coming to rest nearby in a crumpled heap. One hundred people were killed and over 300 injured, with dozens having to be cut out of the wreckage by rescue teams.

The driver, who was believed to have been travelling at 90 kilometres per hour (56 mph), was killed in the crash, the Railway Ministry admitted responsibility for the incident, and promised ₹500,000 ($6700) and a reserved future job on the railway to the family of each victim.
