= 2000 Naka-Meguro derailment =

Multiple-fatality Tokyo Subway accident

Coordinates: 35°38′44″N 139°42′02″E

Naka-Meguro train disaster
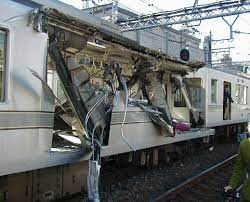

Details
- Date: 8 March 2000 approx 9:00 am
- Location: Near Naka-Meguro Station
- Country: Japan
- Line: TRTA Hibiya Line
- Operator: TRTA
- Incident type: Derailment

Statistics
- Trains: 2
- Deaths: 5
- Injured: 63

The Naka-Meguro train disaster occurred in Japan on 8 March 2000. Five people were killed and 63 were injured when a derailed TRTA Hibiya Line train was sideswiped by a second train near Naka-Meguro Station.

== Accident ==
At around 9 a.m. on 8 March 2000, the rearmost car of an eight-car TRTA Hibiya Line (now Tokyo Metro Hibiya Line) train from Kita-Senju to Kikuna derailed on the tight curve immediately before Naka-Meguro Station. The derailed car was then hit by the fifth and sixth cars of an eight-car Tobu Railway train travelling in the opposite direction from Naka-Meguro to Takenotsuka.

== Factors ==
It is generally the case that if the distance between tracks is less than the width of the carriages this only allows about 600 mm clearance, so that if a train derails on the same side as the other track, it will almost certainly obstruct the other track, making a collision inevitable. Track circuits detect the presence of a train via electric current passed through the rails, which is shorted by a train car's axle or a physical break in the rails. If a derailment on an adjacent track, that doesn't cause a physical break in the other track, won't cause the track circuit to 'short' resulting in a stop signal. In this situation, a train crew member must either warn railway signal staff of the derailment, stop other trains using a handheld signal, such as a red flag, or manually short the track circuit using a specialized equipment, such as a track circuit operating clip.

== See also ==
- List of rail accidents (2000–2009)

=== Similar accidents ===
- 1995 Ais Gill rail accident - A 1995 UK railway accident, where a landslide derailed one train across both tracks of a double track route, which was then struck by a train on the other track heading in the opposite direction.
- Big Bayou Canot rail accident - 1993 USA railway accident, where a train derailed at a bridge struck by a ship. The rails were forced out of alignment, but did not separate, which resulted in the track circuit not indicating a track fault.
