= 2009 Walt Disney World monorail accident =

Monorail collision in Bay Lake, Florida

Walt Disney World Monorail accident
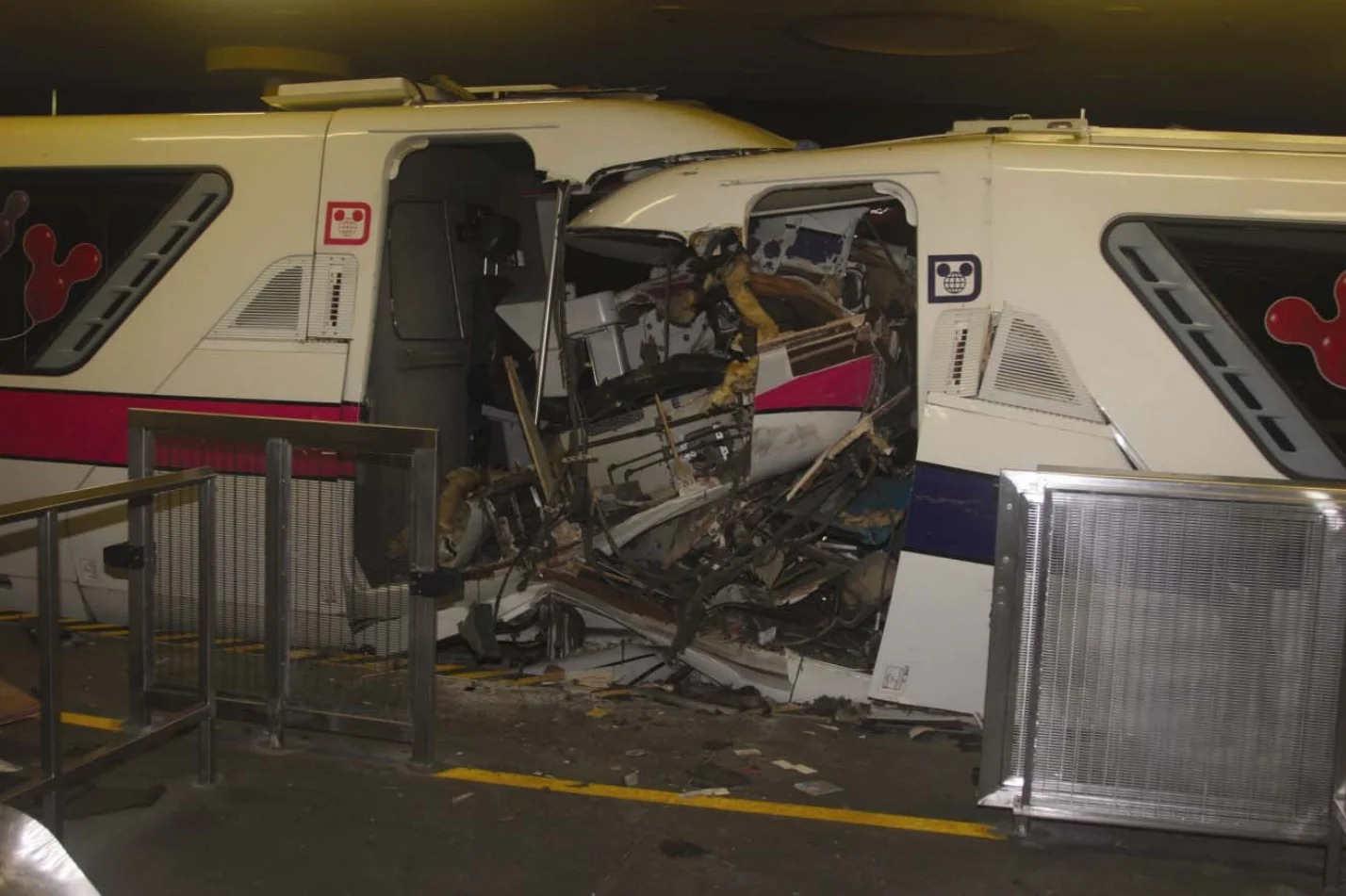
- The rear cab of Monorail Pink (left), and the front cab of Monorail Purple (right) after the collision.

Details
- Date: July 5, 2009; 17 years ago
- Location: Transportation and Ticket Center, Bay Lake, Florida
- Coordinates: 28°24′21″N 81°34′46″W
- Country: United States
- Operator: Walt Disney World

Statistics
- Deaths: 1
- Injured: 7

On July 5, 2009, two monorails of the Walt Disney World Monorail System collided at the Transportation & Ticket Center in Bay Lake, Florida, United States, killing one pilot and injuring seven others. The National Transportation Safety Board found the probable cause of the incident to be the operator's failure to properly position the track switch, compounded by the monorail manager authorizing the reverse movement of Monorail Pink without verifying that the switch was positioned properly.

== Collision ==
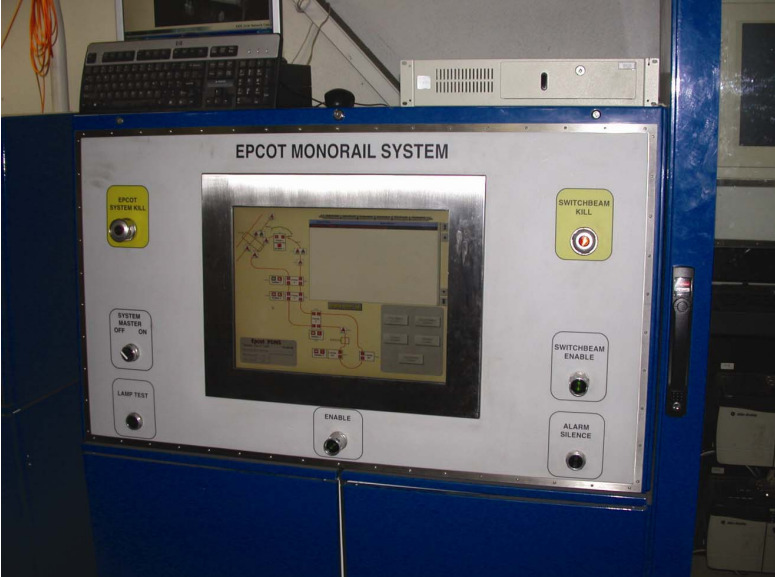
The Power Distribution and Monitor System switch panel that was used to control the eighth and ninth switch beams

On July 5, 2009, during a failed track switchover from the Epcot line onto the Magic Kingdom express line, Monorail Pink backed into Monorail Purple at the Transportation & Ticket Center station in Bay Lake, Florida. The collision killed Monorail Purple's pilot, 21-year-old Austin Wuennenberg of Kissimmee, Florida. One employee and six guests who were also on the trains were treated at the scene and released. The Occupational Safety and Health Administration (OSHA) and park officials inspected the monorail line. The monorail reopened on July 6, 2009, after new sensors and operating procedures were put in place.

== Timeline ==
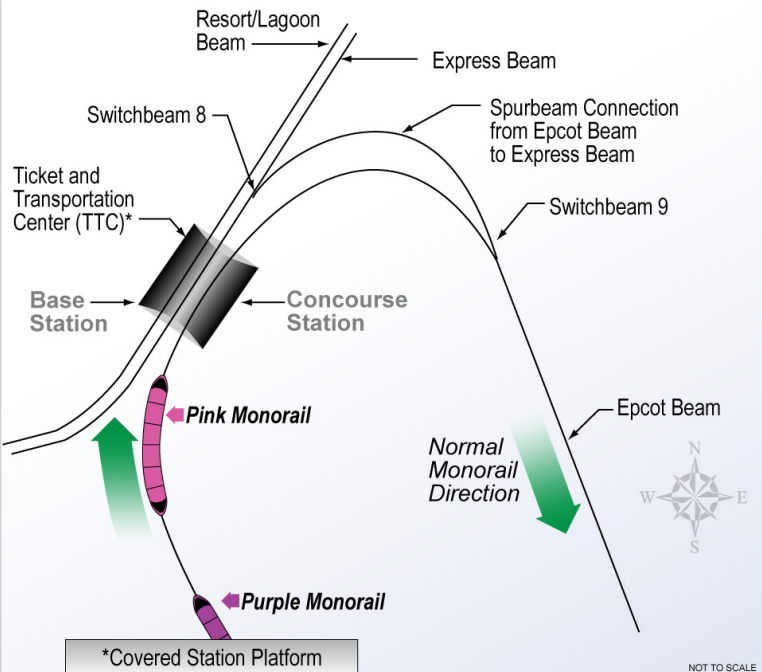
Part one of four of a graphic of the timeline of the incident.

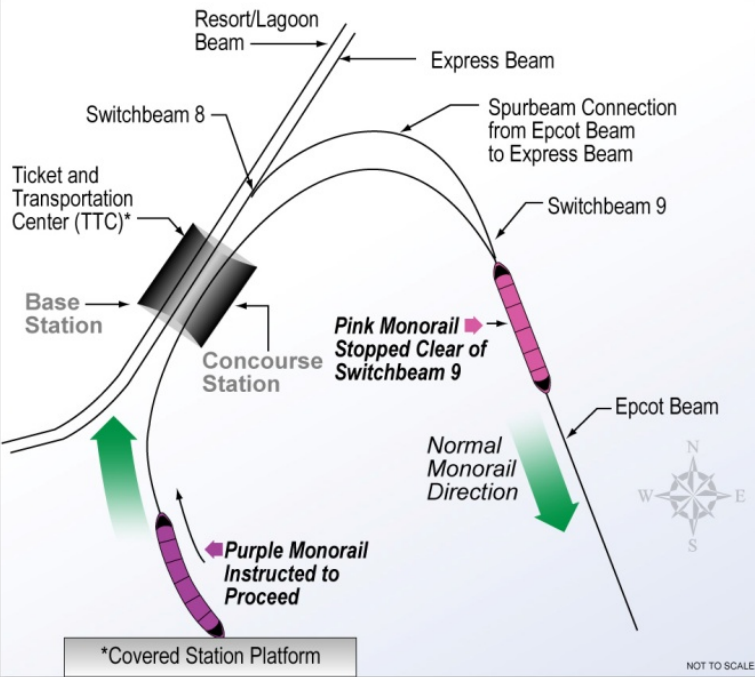
Part two of four of a graphic of the timeline of the incident.

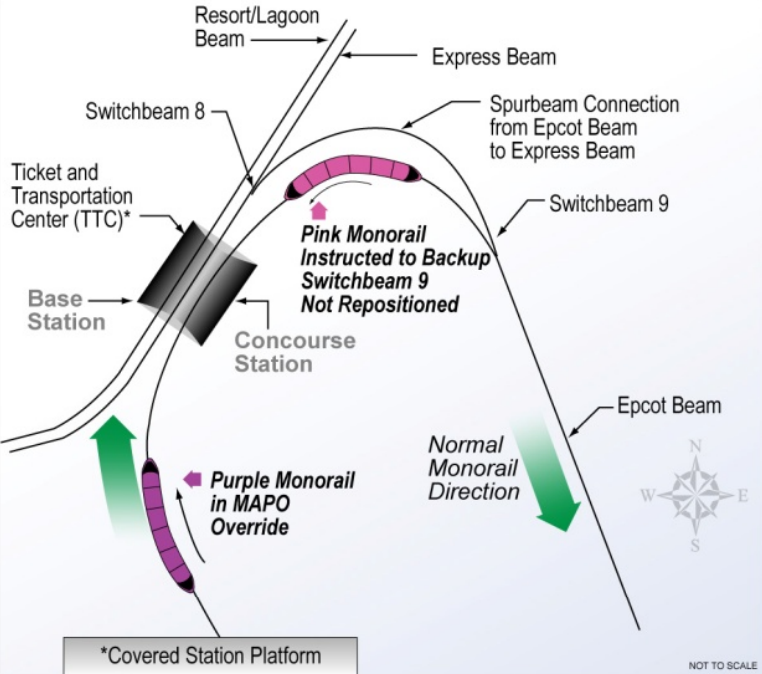
Part three of four of a graphic of the timeline of the incident.

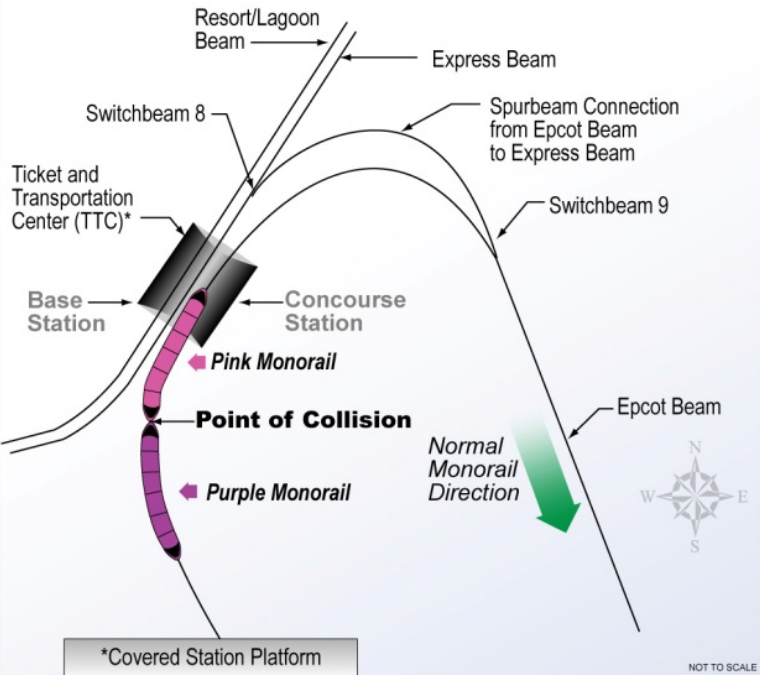
Last part of a graphic of the timeline of the incident. This showed what happened at the time of the incident on July 5, 2009 at 2:00 A.M. Eastern Standard Time

== Aftermath ==
Monorail Pink as it was prior to an accident.

Monorail Purple as it was prior to an accident.

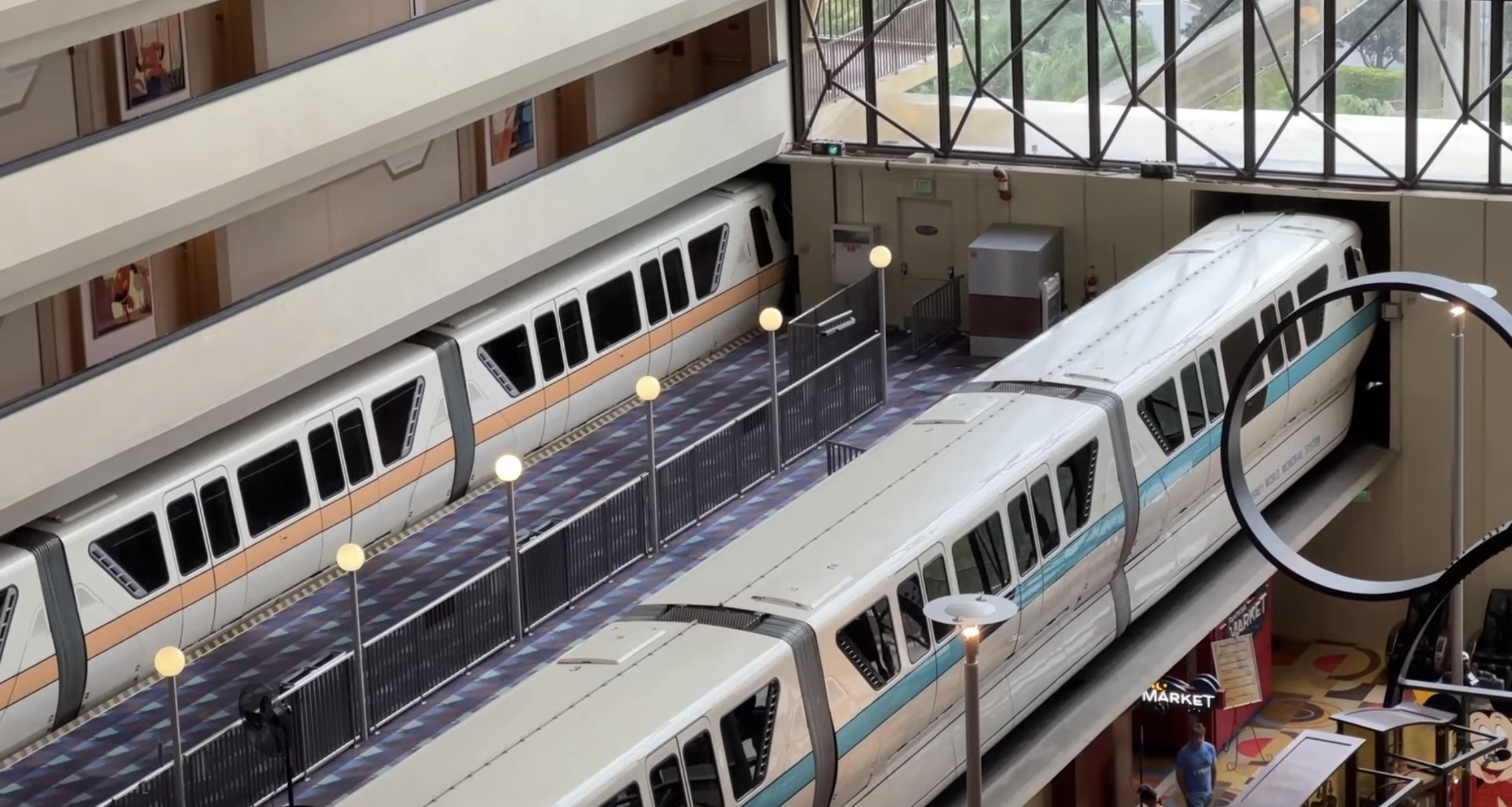
Monorail Teal and Peach, both rebuilt after Monorail Pink and Purple were retired.

An investigation by the National Transportation Safety Board (NTSB) found no mechanical problems with the trains or track, but did find that the track used in the switchover was not in its proper place for the track transition. The NTSB also noted that Monorail Purple's pilot attempted to reverse his train when he saw that there was going to be a collision. Disney placed three monorail employees on paid administrative leave as a result of the incident. On October 31, 2011, the NTSB issued its findings on this incident, citing the probable cause as the shop panel operator's failure to properly align the switch beam before the monorail train was directed to reverse through it. As a result of this incident, cab riding for guests was discontinued. OSHA proposed a total of $44,000 fines against Disney for safety violations, but that amount was later reduced to $35,200.

== New safety procedures ==
In monorail systems, operational safety procedures mandate that drivers perform a visual inspection of switch-beam alignment before initiating a transition between guideways. This verification ensures that the switch mechanism is correctly positioned to support the intended directional change, thereby minimizing the risk of routing errors or mechanical failure during beam transfer.

In monorail systems utilizing the Moving Block Automatic Protection Override (MAPO override), operational guidelines restrict its use to specific scenarios. A central coordinator is authorized to initiate MAPO override only during beam-switching procedures, when a train transitions from one guideway to another. For any other movement under MAPO override conditions, formal approval from a designated monorail manager is required. This protocol regulates the use of override functions and maintains supervisory control during non-standard operations.

Standard operating procedures in monorail systems require train operators to remain in the forward-facing cab during transitions between guideways. This positioning supports visibility and operational control throughout the switching process. If a switching maneuver must be aborted due to safety concerns, operators may reverse out of the switch, provided that an observer monitors the rearward movement to maintain safe clearance and prevent hazards.

Monorail operations follow oversight protocols designed to regulate beam-switching procedures. During switching activities, the central coordinator remains inside the control tower and conducts a direct visual inspection of beam alignment and power status. In maintenance settings, shop panel operators confirm switch beam positions via video surveillance systems, with a second operator assigned to independently verify each confirmation.

Monorail personnel have received specialized training to address visibility limitations caused by windshield condensation, a condition that may affect operator perception during transit and beam-switching procedures.

== See also ==
- List of incidents at Disney parks
  - List of incidents at Walt Disney World
- HemisFair '68 Monorail
- Lists of rail accidents
