= Monorierdő train collision =

Train wreck

Coordinates: 47°18′29″N 19°30′01″E

Details
- Date: 6 October 2008; 10:20 CEST (UTC+02:00)
- Location: Monorierdő, Pest County
- Country: Hungary
- Operator: Hungarian State Railways
- Incident type: Collision
- Cause: Train control error

Statistics
- Trains: 2
- Deaths: 4
- Injured: 27

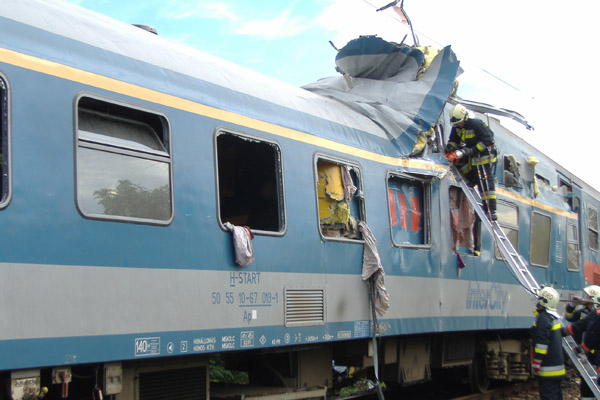
Emergency personnel rescue passengers after the Monorierdő train collision.

The Monorierdő train collision occurred on 6 October 2008, near Monorierdő, Hungary. A regular passenger train coming from Cegléd collided with the Hajdú InterCity train, on its way from Nyíregyháza to Budapest. At 10:20 CEST (08:20 UTC), the regular train's control car crashed into the last car of the Intercity train; its engine driver survived, because he ran back into the first car to warn the passengers when he realized the accident could not be avoided. The tragedy was caused by an error in the train control system and by the error of the passenger train's driver.

Four travelers died as a result of the accident (three people on the site, and one of them in the hospital). 27 people were in need of additional hospital treatment. Pál Szabó, the traffic minister of Hungary offered his resignation shortly after the tragedy, and Miklós Kamarás, the president of MÁV (Hungarian State Railways Co.) did the same. Prime minister Ferenc Gyurcsány accepted both, however, he didn't accept the resignation of István Heinczinger, CEO of MÁV.
