= Kølkær =

- Village
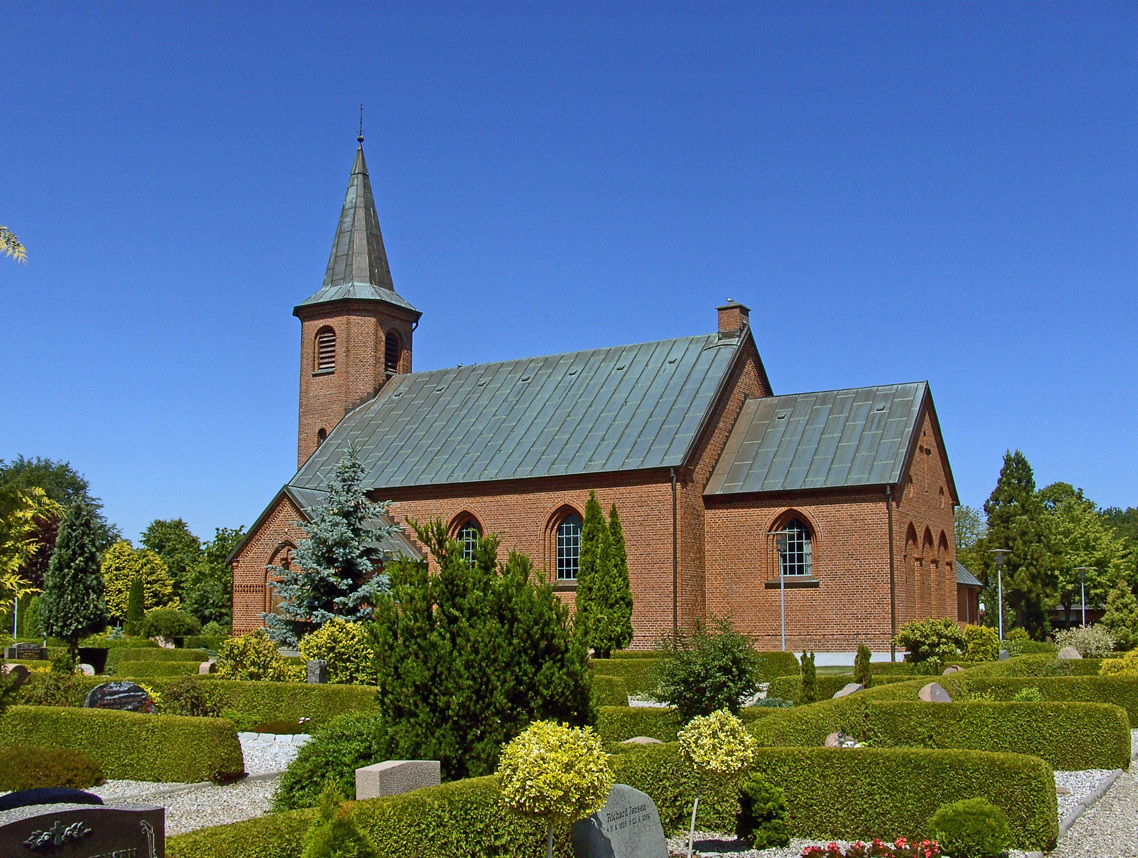
- Kølkær Church

- Location in Central Denmark Region Kølkær (Denmark)
- Coordinates: 56°3′57″N 9°5′9″E
- Country: Denmark
- Region: Central Denmark (Midtjylland)
- Municipality: Herning Municipality
- Parish: Kølkær Parish

Population (2026)
  - Total: 530

Kølkær is a village, with a population of 530 (1 January 2026), in Herning Municipality, Central Denmark Region in Denmark.

Kølkær Church is located in the village. It is built in 1891 in red bricks with a copper roof.
