= List of disasters in Germany by death toll =

The list of disasters in Germany by death toll includes major disasters and accidents – excluding warfare and other intentional acts – that took place on German soil, involved the German military, or the predominant number of victims were Germans or German citizens.

== Over 100 confirmed deaths ==
| Fatalities | Year | Article | Type | Location | Comments |
|---|---|---|---|---|---|
| 560 | 1921 | Oppau explosion | Explosion | Ludwigshafen, Rhineland-Palatinate | |
| 539 (Germans) | 2004 | 2004 Indian Ocean earthquake and tsunami | Tsunami | Areas bordering the Indian Ocean | |
| 347 | 1962 | North Sea flood of 1962 | Flood | Areas bordering the North Sea | |
| 299 | 1962 | Luisenthal mine disaster | Mining accident | Völklingen, Saarland | |
| 278 | 1939 | Genthin rail disaster | Train collision | Genthin, Saxony-Anhalt | |
| 207 | 1948 | BASF disaster | Explosion | Ludwigshafen, Rhineland-Palatinate | |
| 196 | 2021 | 2021 European floods | Floods | Rhineland-Palatinate, North Rhine-Westphalia, and Bavaria | |
| 167 (Germans) | 1996 | Birgenair Flight 301 | Plane crash | Atlantic Ocean near the Dominican Republic | |
| 156 | 1972 | Interflug Flight 450 | Plane crash | near Königs Wusterhausen, Brandenburg | |
| 122 | 1941 | Gifhorn train crash | Train collision | Gifhorn, Lower Saxony | |
| 108 (Germans) | 1976 | 1976 Zagreb mid-air collision | Mid-air collision | over Zagreb, Croatia | |
| 101 | 1902 | Primus disaster | Shipwreck | Elbe, Hamburg | |
| 101 | 1998 | Eschede train disaster | Train derailment | Eschede, Lower Saxony | |
| 101 | 1939 | Markdorf rail disaster | Train collision | Markdorf, Baden-Württemberg | |

== 40 to 99 confirmed deaths ==
| Fatalities | Year | Article | Type | Location | Comments |
|---|---|---|---|---|---|
| 97 (Germans) | 2000 | Air France Flight 4590 | Plane crash | Gonesse, France | |
| 94 | 1967 | Langenweddingen level crossing disaster | Level crossing disaster | Sülzetal, Saxony-Anhalt | |
| 81 | 1947 | Karlslust dance hall fire | Structure fire | Berlin | |
| 81 | 1925 | Veltheim ferry accident | Ferry disaster | Porta Westfalica, North Rhine-Westphalia | |
| 80 | 1945 | 1945 Resko Przymorskie Dornier Do 24 crash | Plane crash | Resko Przymorskie, Poland | |
| 79 | 1944 | Porta Westfalica disaster | Train collision | Porta Westfalica station, North Rhine-Westphalia | |
| 72 | 1986 | Aeroflot Flight 892 | Plane crash | East Berlin, Berlin | |
| 72 | 1929-1933 | Lübeck disaster | Medical malpractice | Lübeck, Schleswig-Holstein | |
| 72 (Germans) | 2015 | Germanwings Flight 9525 | Deliberate plane crash | Prads-Haute-Bléone, France | |
| 71 | 2002 | 2002 Überlingen mid-air collision | Mid-air collision | Überlingen, Baden-Württemberg | |
| 70 | 1988 | Ramstein air show disaster | Airshow disaster | Ramstein Air Base, Rhineland-Palatinate | |
| 70 | 1962 | Trebbin rail accident | Train collision | Trebbin, Brandenburg | |
| 69 | 1882 | Hugstetten rail disaster | Train Derailment | March, Baden-Württemberg | |
| 66 | 1955 | 1955 Altensteig mid-air collision | Mid-air collision | Altensteig, Baden-Württemberg | |
| 56 | 1944 | Müncheberg train collision | Train collision | Müncheberg, Brandenburg | |
| 54 | 1960 | Leipzig train disaster | Train collision | Leipzig, Saxony | |
| 52 | 1960 | 1960 Munich C-131 crash | Plane crash | Munich, Bavaria | |
| 52 | 1961 | ČSA Flight 511 (March 1961) | Plane crash | Igensdorf, Bavaria | |
| 48 | 1923 | Kreiensen train accident | Train collision | Kreiensen, Lower Saxony | |
| 48 | 1956 | Bornitz rail accident | Train collision | Bornitz, Saxony-Anhalt | |
| 48 | 1968 | British Eagle Flight 802 | Plane crash | Langenbruck, Bavaria | |
| 46 | 1982 | 1982 Mannheim helicopter crash | Helicopter crash | Mannheim, Baden-Württemberg | |
| 46 | 1971 | Dahlerau train disaster | Train collision | Dahlerau, North Rhine-Westphalia | |
| 46 | 1966 | Lufthansa Flight 005 | Plane crash | Bremen Airport, (Bremen (state)) Bremen | |
| 45 | 1952 | KLM Flight 592 | Plane crash | near Frankfurt, Hesse | |
| 45 | 1959 | Lauffen bus crash | Level crossing accident | Lauffen, Baden-Württemberg | |
| 45 | 1922 | Berlin Schönhauser Allee train disaster | Train accident | Prenzlauer Berg, Berlin | |
| 44 | 1953 | 1953 Sabena Convair CV-240 crash | Plane crash | near Frankfurt, Hesse | |
| 44 | 1964 | 1964 Langhagen train disaster | Train collision | Lalendorf, Mecklenburg-Vorpommern | |
| 42 | 1947 | Neuwied train disaster | Train collision | Neuwied, Rhineland-Palatinate | |

== 20 to 39 confirmed deaths ==
| Fatalities | Year | Article | Type | Location | Comments |
|---|---|---|---|---|---|
| 39 | 1883 | Steglitz train accident | Train accident | Steglitz, Berlin | |
| 38 | 1963 | 1963 Senne training disaster | Military training accident | Senne, North Rhine-Westphalia | |
| 38 | 1948 | Neddemin train disaster | Train collision | Neddemin, Mecklenburg-Vorpommern | |
| 38 | 1943 | Tantow train disaster | Train collision | Tantow, Brandenburg | |
| 38 | 1930 | Koblenz bridge collapse | Bridge collapse | Koblenz, Rhineland-Palatinate | |
| 38 | 1918 | Kirn train disaster | Train derailment | Kirn, Rhineland-Palatinate | |
| 38 | 1917 | Heessen train accident | Train collision | Heeßen, North Rhine-Westphalia | |
| 37 | 1971 | CH-47 helicopter crash near Pegnitz | Helicopter crash | near Pegnitz, Bavaria | |
| 35 | 1943 | Naumburg train disaster | Train collision | Naumburg (Saale) Hauptbahnhof, Saxony-Anhalt | |
| 35 | 1961 | Esslingen train accident | Train collision | Esslingen, Baden-Württemberg | |
| 34 | 1935 | Großheringen train disaster | Train collision | Großheringen, Thuringia | |
| 33 | 1966 | Werschau bus accident | Bus accident | Werschau, Hesse | |
| 31 | 1918 | Dümpelfeld train collision | Train collision | Dümpelfeld, Rhineland-Palatinate | |
| 30 | 1951 | Heimatland disaster | Shipwreck | Berlin | |
| 30 | 1946 | Tröglitz train accident | Train derailment | Tröglitz, Saxony-Anhalt | |
| 29 | 1940 | 1940 Deutsche Lufthansa Ju 90 crash | Plane crash | Schönteichen, Saxony | |
| 29 | 1944 | Bad Zwischenahn train accident | Train collision | Bad Zwischenahn, Lower Saxony | |
| 29 | 1977 | Lebus train collision | Train collision | Lebus, Brandenburg | |
| 29 | 1940 | 1940 Deutsche Lufthansa Ju 90 crash | Plane crash | Schönteichen, Saxony | |
| 29 | 1923 | Sankt Goar train disaster | Train derailment | Sankt Goar, Rhineland-Palatinate | |
| 28 | 1913 | Johannisthal air disaster | Airship disaster | Johannisthal Air Field, Berlin | |
| 28 | 1991 | Hohen Nistler disaster | Plane crash | near Heidelberg, Baden-Württemberg | |
| 28 | 1971 | Aitrang disaster | Train collision | Aitrang, Bavaria | |
| 28 | 1923 | Kettwig train accident | Train collision | Kettwig, North Rhine-Westphalia | |
| 28 | 1943 | 1943 Dortmund train collision | Train collision | Dortmund, North Rhine-Westphalia | |
| 27 | 1975 | Interflug Flight 1107 | Plane crash | Leipzig/Halle Airport, Saxony | |
| 27 | 1941 | 1941 Langhagen train disaster | Train collision | Lalendorf, Mecklenburg-Vorpommern | |
| 27 (Germans) | 1937 | Hindenburg disaster | Airship disaster | Manchester Township, New Jersey, United States | |
| 26-45 | 1962 | Crash of Navy reconnaissance plane 131390 | Plane crash | near Munich, Bavaria | |
| 26 | 1876 | Kaub landslide | Landslide | Kaub, Rhineland-Palatinate | |
| 26 | 1954 | Abenheim level crossing disaster | Level crossing disaster | near Abenheim, Rhineland-Palatinate | |
| 26 | 1917 | Schönhausen train collision | Train collision | Schönhausen, Saxony-Anhalt | |
| 26 | 1945 | Gaggenau plane crash | Plane crash | Gaggenau, Baden-Württemberg | |
| 26 (Germans) | 2009 | Air France Flight 447 | Plane crash | Atlantic Ocean | |
| 26 | 1951 | Kemlitz disaster | Aviation disaster | Kemlitz, Brandenburg | |
| 26 | 1939 | 1939 Neuhammer disaster | Aviation disaster | Świętoszów, Poland | |
| 25 | 1972 | Schweinsburg-Culten train disaster | Train collision | Schweinsburg-Culten, Saxony | |
| 25 | 1943 | Lohde train accident | Train accident | Lohde, Lower Saxony | |
| 25 | 1945 | Crash of the "Hessen" | Plane crash | Egglkofen, Bavaria | |
| 24 | 1947 | Velten train fire | Train fire | Velten, Brandenburg | |
| 24 | 1946 | 1946 Eilsleben train collision | Train collision | Eilsleben, Saxony-Anhalt | |
| 24 | 1944 | Neuenkirchen disaster | Aviation disaster | Neuenkirchen, North Rhine-Westphalia | |
| 24 | 1925 | Herne train accident | Train collision | Herne, North Rhine-Westphalia | |
| 23 | 1971 | Rheinweiler train accident | Train derailment | Rheinweiler, Baden-Württemberg | |
| 23 | 1958 | Munich air disaster | Plane crash | Munich, Bavaria | |
| 23 | 2006 | Lathen train collision | Train collision | Lathen, Lower Saxony | |
| 23 | 1939 | 1939 Berlin Gesundbrunnen train disaster | Train collision | Gesundbrunnen, Berlin | |
| 22 | 1971 | Paninternational Flight 112 | Plane crash | near Hamburg | |
| 22 | 1989 | Interflug Flight 102 | Plane crash | Berlin Schönefeld Airport, Brandenburg | |
| 22 | 1910 | Cologne-Mülheim train accident | Train collision | Cologne-Mülheim station, North Rhine-Westphalia | |
| 22 | 1884 | 1884 Hanau train disaster | Train collision | Hanau, Hesse | |
| 21 | 1988 | Nürnberger Flugdienst Flight 108 | Plane crash | Kettwig, North Rhine-Westphalia | |
| 21 | 1941 | Wilhelmshaven train accident | Train collision | Wilhelmshaven, Lower Saxony | |
| 21 | 1985 | Langenbruck bus crash | Bus crash | Langenbruck, Bavaria | |
| 21 | 2010 | Love Parade disaster | Crowd disaster | Duisburg, North Rhine-Westphalia | |
| 21 | 1945 | Goch train disaster | Train collision | Goch, North Rhine-Westphalia | |
| 20 | 1938 | Soest plane crash | Plane crash | Soest, North Rhine-Westphalia | |

== 10 to 19 confirmed deaths ==
| Fatalities | Year | Article | Type | Location | Comments |
|---|---|---|---|---|---|
| 19 | 1984 | Martina disaster | Shipwreck | Port of Hamburg | |
| 19 | 1918 | Briesen train accident | Train collision | Briesen, Brandenburg | |
| 19 | 1916 | Rahnsdorf disaster | Train accident | Rahnsdorf, Berlin | |
| 19 | 1905 | Spremberg train collision | Train collision | Spremberg, Brandenburg | |
| 19 | 1915 | LZ 40 disaster | Airship disaster | Cuxhaven, Lower Saxony | |
| 19 | 1917 | Düren train collision | Train collision | Düren, North Rhine-Westphalia | |
| 19 | 1871 | Rackwitz train disaster | Train collision | Rackwitz, Saxony | |
| 18 | 1945 | Hüttengrund train disaster | Train derailment | Marienberg, Saxony | |
| 18 | 1937 | Holzheim train accident | Train derailment | Neuss, North Rhine-Westphalia | |
| 18 | 1918 | Sandersleben train disaster | Train collision | Sandersleben, Saxony-Anhalt | |
| 18 | 2017 | 2017 Münchberg bus crash | Bus accident | Münchberg, Bavaria | |
| 18 | 1949 | Manfort level crossing disaster | Level crossing disaster | Manfort, North Rhine-Westphalia | |
| 18 | 1943 | Plane crash over Swabia | Aviation disaster | Bauhofen, Bavaria | |
| 18 | 1918 | Dresden-Neustadt train disaster | Train collision | Dresden, Saxony | |
| 18 | 1908 | 1908 Gleisdreieck train collision | Train collision | Kreuzberg, Berlin | |
| 17 | 1996 | Düsseldorf Airport fire | Structure fire | Düsseldorf Airport, North Rhine-Westphalia | |
| 17 | 1990 | Rüsselsheim train disaster | Train collision | Rüsselsheim am Main, Hesse | |
| 17 | 1938 | Durbach plane crash | Plane crash | Durbach, Baden-Württemberg | |
| 17 | 1958 | Drachenfels train disaster | Train derailment | Drachenfels, North Rhine-Westphalia | |
| 17 | 1920 | Silberhausen railway accident | Train derailment | Silberhausen, Thuringia | |
| 16 | 1941 | Gusow train disaster | Train collision | Gusow, Brandenburg | |
| 16 | 1929 | Buir railway accident | Train derailment | Buir, North Rhine-Westphalia | |
| 16 | 1918 | Jünkerath train collision | Train collision | Jünkerath, Rhineland-Palatinate | |
| 15 | 1951 | Kenn level crossing disaster | Level crossing disaster | Kenn, Rhineland-Palatinate | |
| 15 | 1954 | 1954 Dortmund train collision | Train collision | Dortmund, North Rhine-Westphalia | |
| 15 | 1939 | Hagen-Vorhalle train collision | Train collision | between Hagen-Vorhalle and Wetter stations, North Rhine-Westphalia | |
| 15 | 1939 | 1939 Buchholz train collision | Train collision | Buchholz, Lower Saxony | |
| 15 | 1948 | 1948 Gatow air disaster | Mid-air collision | near RAF Gatow, Berlin | |
| 15 | 2006 | Bad Reichenhall collapse | Building collapse | Bad Reichenhall, Bavaria | |
| 14 | 1981 | Erfurt-Bischleben train derailment | Train derailment | Erfurt, Thuringia | |
| 14 | 1911 | Müllheim train accident | Train derailment | Müllheim, Baden-Württemberg | |
| 14 | 1913 | Helgoland Island air disaster | Airship disaster | Heligoland, Schleswig-Holstein | |
| 14 | 1924 | Mainz train disaster | Train collision | Mainz, Rhineland-Palatinate | |
| 14 | 1973 | Guntershausen train disaster | Train collision | Baunatal, Hesse | |
| 14 | 1918 | Bous disaster | Train explosion | Bous, Saarland | |
| 13-16 | 1895 | Explosion of the Elizabeth | Ship explosion | Emmerich, North Rhine-Westphalia | |
| 13 | 1985 | 1985 Eilsleben train collision | Train collision | Between Wefensleben and Eilsleben, Saxony-Anhalt | |
| 13 | 1996 | Jugendmesse YOU disaster | Helicopter crash | Dortmund, North Rhine-Westphalia | |
| 13 | 1939 | Mittelgrund train disaster | Train derailment | Pirna, Saxony | |
| 13 | 1990 | Crash of a US Air Force Lockheed C-5 Galaxy near Ramstein | Plane crash | Ramstein Air Base, Rhineland-Palatinate | |
| 12-33 | 1918 | Bruchmühlbach train disaster | Train collision | Bruchmühlbach, Rhineland-Palatinate | |
| 12 | 1934 | 1934 Swissair Tuttlingen accident | Plane crash | Tuttlingen, Baden-Württemberg | |
| 12 | 2016 | Bad Aibling rail accident | Train collision | Bad Aibling, Bavaria | |
| 12 | 1940 | Zittau train disaster | Train collision | Zittau, Saxony | |
| 12 | 1948 | 1948 Ulrichstein plane crash | Plane crash | Ulrichstein, Hesse | |
| 12 | 1923 | Cannstatt railway accident | Train collision | Stuttgart, Baden-Württemberg | |
| 12 | 1969 | Lingen train accident | Train explosion | Lingen, Lower Saxony | |
| 12 | 1900 | 1900 Mühlheim am Main disaster | Train collision | Between Mühlheim am Main and Offenbach am Main, Hesse | |
| 12 | 1944 | Warthausen railway accident | Train collision | Warthausen, Baden-Württemberg | |
| 12 | 1901 | Altenbeken train accident | Train collision | Altenbeken, North Rhine-Westphalia | |
| 11 | 1984 | Hohenthurm railway accident | Train collision | Hohenthurm, Saxony-Anhalt | |
| 11 | 1975 | Hamburg-Hausbruch train disaster | Train collision | Hausbruch, Hamburg | |
| 11 | 1992 | Northeim train accident | Train collision | Northeim, Lower Saxony | |
| 11 | 1969 | Bockhorn plane crash | Plane crash | Bockhorn, Bavaria | |
| 11 | 1940 | Cloppenburg train collision | Train collision | Cloppenburg, Saxony | |
| 11 | 1951 | Meiningen train disaster | Train boiler explosion | Meiningen, Thuringia | |
| 10 | 2011 | Hordorf train collision | Train collision | Oschersleben, Saxony-Anhalt | |
| 10 | 1942 | Werbig train collision | Train collision | Seelow, Brandenburg | |
| 19 | 1937 | Schriesheim plane crash | Plane crash | Schriesheim, Baden-Württemberg | |
| 10 | 1990 | 1990 Münchberg disaster | Pileup | Münchberg, Bavaria | |
| 10 | 1913 | Braunsdorf train disaster | Train derailment | Braunsdorf, Saxony | |
| 10 | 1897 | Pelm railway disaster | Train collision | near Gerolstein, Rhineland-Palatinate | |
| 10 | 1895 | Oederan train disaster | Train collision | Oederan, Saxony | |
| 10 | 1996 | 1996 Freilassing plane disaster | Plane crash | Freilassing, Bavaria | |

== Fewer than 10 confirmed deaths ==
| Disaster | Type | Location | Deaths | Date | Ref. |
|---|---|---|---|---|---|
| Brühl train derailment | Train wreck | Brühl | 9 | 6 February 2000 | |
| 2021 Leverkusen explosion | Explosion | Chempark in Leverkusen | 7 | 27 July 2021 | |
| Mühldorf van crash | Traffic collision | Mühldorf | 7 | 13 October 2023 | |
| 1983 Rhein-Main Starfighter crash | Aviation accident | Rhein-Main Air Base | 6 | 22 May 1983 | |
| Forst Zinna rail disaster | Train wreck | Forst Zinna | 6 | 19 January 1988 | |
| 2024 Germany floods | Flood | Bavaria and Baden-Württemberg | 6 | 30 May – 13 June 2024 | |
| English calamity | Mountaineering disaster | The Schauinsland (near Freiburg im Breisgau) | 5 | 17 April 1936 | |
| 1999 Wuppertal Schwebebahn accident | Train wreck | Wuppertal | 5 | 12 April 1999 | |
| Burgrain train derailment | Train wreck | Burgrain | 5 | 3 June 2022 | |

== See also ==
- List of disasters in Antarctica by death toll
- List of disasters in Canada by death toll
- List of disasters in Croatia by death toll
- List of disasters in Great Britain and Ireland by death toll
- List of disasters in New Zealand by death toll
- List of disasters in Poland by death toll
- List of disasters in Ukraine by death toll
- List of disasters in Sweden by death toll
- List of disasters in the United States by death toll
- List of earthquakes in Germany
- List of German rail accidents
