= List of German rail accidents =

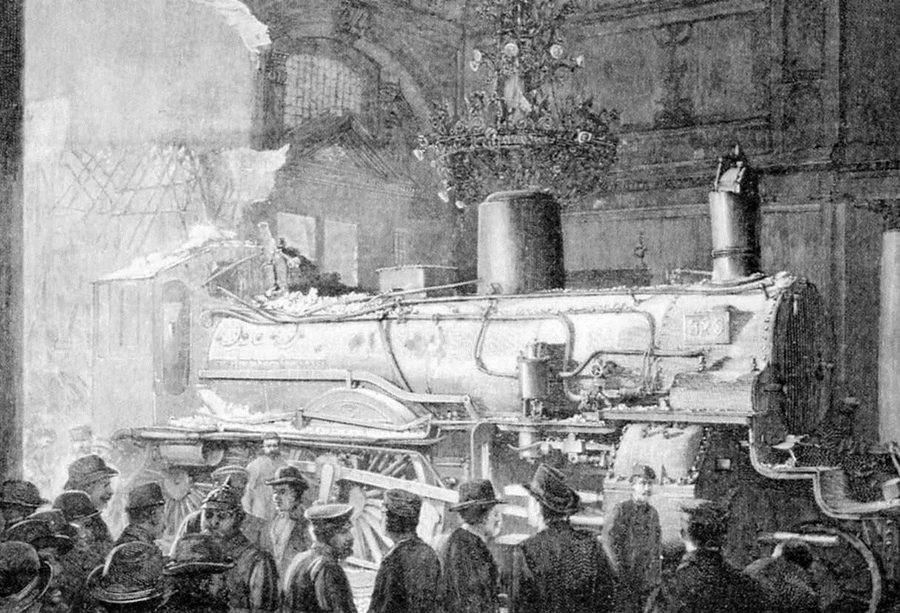
Frankfurt (Main) Central Station 1901

This list of German rail accidents includes those in:

- German states (excluding Austria) before 1871
- German Reich
- Allied-occupied Germany
- Federal Republic of Germany
- German Democratic Republic

== List ==
Accident	Location	Date	Killed	Injured	Description
Gütersloh-Avenwedde rail accident		21 January 1851	3	7	Derailment of a Long Boiler locomotive which caused passenger coaches to derail. One of the injured passengers was Prince Frederick of Prussia, later German Emperor.
Hugstetten rail disaster	Hugstetten	3 September 1882	64	230	Track failure (after a strong thunderstorm) derailed the train. Improper track maintenance and overspeed are also mentioned.
Steglitz rail accident		2 September 1883	39	8+?	A large crowd, out of control, crossed the main line to reach a departing local train. An express approaching on the main line ran into the crowd.
1884 Hanau rail accident		14 November 1884	22	26	After a rear-end collision of a passenger train into a freight train, the derailed vehicles also blocked the second track for trains moving in the opposite direction. An oncoming train on the second track hit the remains of the first accident.
Würzburg rail accident		1 July 1886	16	70	The misunderstanding of two traffic controllers brings two trains onto the same track, resulting in a head-on collision.
Pelm rail accident		18 May 1897	10	40	After the division of a running train, the rear part collided with the front part later on.
1900 Mühlheim am Main rail accident		8 November 1900	12	4	Rear-end collision under heavy fog; gas used for car-lighting caused a fire.
1901 Ludwigshafen rail accident		9 May 1901	1	2	Spectacular overrun of a buffer stop due to defective brakes
Frankfurt Central Station rail accident		6 December 1901	0	0	Failing brakes caused the engine of the Ostend-Vienna-Express to overrun the buffer stop at Frankfurt Central station and smash a hole into the opposite wall, coming to a stop only in the waiting room of the station. Nobody was seriously hurt.
Altenbeken rail accident		20 December 1901	12	27	Rear-end collision after signalling a “go ahead” to the following train too early.
Zschortau rail accident		5 May 1902	2	7	Derailment after the breaking of an axle of the tender.
Rothenkirchen rail accident		7 August 1903	3	30	Excessive speed threw a train out of a narrow curve.
Herbolzheim rail accident		2 December 1903	1	?	Shunting engine in the way of an express which hit it
Primkenau Forest fire		15 August 1904	1	?	Sparks of a steam engine ignited a forest, burning down 46 square kilometers of it.
Schwegenheim rail accident		25 May 1905	1	1	A construction train derailed after heavy braking.
Spremberg rail accident		7 August 1905	19	40	A drunken train controller let two trains onto the same track, causing a head-on collision.
Rabishau rail accident	Rabishau	31 October 1906	0	2	Two cargo trains collided at Rabishau on the Silesian Mountain Railway.
Züllichau level crossing accident		28 October 1909	4	0	First documented level crossing crash between a train and a motor car.
Müllheim rail accident		17 July 1911	11	32	Drunken engineer falls asleep, passes a speed limit with excessive speed, which causes the train to derail into a construction site.
Waldenburg rail accident		22 October 1913	14	?	A runaway freight car collided with a tram on a level crossing.
Braunsdorf rail accident		14 December 1913	10	53	After a landslide the exit of a tunnel was blocked. A passenger train passing through the tunnel rammed itself into the rocks.
Nannhofen rail accident		17 April 1917	30	80	Express overran a stop signal and crashed into the side of a shunting mixed train. At the time, the railroad was using a white light to show permission to travel (although all other German railroads had switched to green in 1913); the driver probably confused the windows of the mixed train with the signal light.
Schönhausen rail accident		16 October 1917	26	16	Passenger train passed a red signal and rear-ended a freight train.
Osnabrück train collision	Osnabrück	15 January 1918	31	66	Train stopped for an obstacle on the railway between Ostercappeln and Bohmte, close to Osnabrück. While stationary, another train from Hamburg crashed into it. Amongst the dead were 12 Finnish jägers.
Dresden-Neustadt rail accident		22 September 1918	18	118	An overrun red signal led to a rear-end crash of two express trains.
Briesen rail accident		1 November 1918	19	45	Several cars at the rear of a freight train came loose after a coupling failed. A following passenger train rear-ended the cars that had been left behind.
Kranowitz rail accident		24 October 1919	25+	80+	The locomotive of a freight train pulled in too far on an adjacent track, fouling the entrance line. An incoming passenger train from Czechoslovakia sideswiped the locomotive. A fire began in the baggage car and this spread to a barrel of smuggled high-proof alcohol which exploded, spreading the fire to the passenger cars.
Silberhausen rail accident		16 December 1920	17	9	A mixed train lost control on a steep incline, overran a buffer stop and tumbled 20 meters down a slope. The heavy freight-cars loaded with minerals buried the two passenger coaches.
Berlin Schönhauser Allee rail accident		27 June 1922	45	50?	During a memorial service for Walther Rathenau, most railway service was halted early and trains that were still running on the Ringbahn were overcrowded. As a result, passengers rode standing on the footboard of the coaches. A passenger was carrying long objects (probably wooden poles) and these struck numerous passengers on an oncoming train, knocking them off onto the tracks.
Kreiensen rail accident		31 July 1923	48	39	An express overrunning a red signal crashed into another express which stood in the station due to a defective locomotive. Gerhard Domagk, winning the Nobel Prize in Physiology or Medicine in 1939, travelled in one of the totally destroyed coaches and escaped just by chance: he had left the train to get something to drink in the station.
Cannstatt rail accident		15 November 1923	12	15	Engineer misreading a signal collided head-on with an approaching train.
Ludwigsstadt rail accident		18 February 1924	2	0	After malfunction of the brakes, a freight train ran with excessive speed over a point securing a building site. The locomotive and 21 of the cars tumbled from the Trogenbach Viadukt, a bridge 26 meters high partly on top of buildings situated at the foot of the bridge. A part of the train was consumed in the following fire.
Mainz rail accident		24 October 1924	14	?	Due to interference of the French military with the automatic train protection and a “go ahead” given too early, a passenger train rear-ended another train within a tunnel situated south of Mainz Central Station.
Herne rail accident		13 January 1925	24	91	Due to hastily installed train protection, a rear-end collision of two trains happened.
Rabishau, Schlesien rail accident	Rębiszów	9 August 1925	3	2	Two cargo trains collided in dense fog near the Rabishau station on the Silesian Mountain Railway. An electric locomotive and 59 cargo cars were damaged. Twelve rail cars were destroyed.
Langenbach rail accident		13 August 1926	12	20	Badly secured building site led to the derailment of a train.
Leiferde railway attack		19 August 1926	21	40	Two criminals intending to rob a mail-coach damaged the track. Express D 8 from Berlin to Cologne derailed.
Siegelsdorf rail accident		10 June 1928	24	128	Derailment caused by added multiple causes
Donnersberger Bridge rail accident		15 July 1928	10	25	Due to a misunderstanding between traffic controllers, two passenger trains had a rear-end collision when leaving München Hauptbahnhof. A third train could just stop before running into the debris. Still lit by petroleum, the mainly wooden cars caught fire.
Dinkelscherben rail accident		31 July 1928	23	51	Passenger train ran into a freight train. The accident was caused by defective train protection due to work in progress.
Buir rail accident		25 August 1929	14	103	An express negotiated a low speed turnout at 100 km/h instead of 40 km/h and derailed.
Rail accident of Großheringen	Großheringen	24 December 1935	34	27	Express overran a red signal and crashed into the side of another passenger train.
Rail accident of Holzheim		15 September 1937	17	35	On a building site, the "slow down" signal was not installed. So a train passed at too high a speed and derailed.
Rail accident of Bauerwitz		12 November 1939	43	77	Due to a mistake by a traffic controller, two trains entered the same section of a single-track line and collided head-on.
Genthin rail disaster	Genthin	22 December 1939	186	106	Rear-end collision of two express trains after overrunning a red signal
Markdorf rail disaster		22 December 1939	101	47	A traffic controller's mistake led to a head-on collision of a passenger train and a freight train. Bad weather and wartime precautions were contributing factors.
Rail accident of Gifhorn	Gifhorn	22 January 1941	122	80	Rear-end collision of a freight train overrunning a red signal and running into a train which was carrying about 1,000 prisoners of war.
Rail accident of Leichholz	Leichholz	27 December 1941	44	67	After the division of a freight train transporting petrol, a following express collided with those cars of the freight train which were disconnected. The collision caused an explosion of the petrol.
Halbstadt rail accident	Meziměstí	8 June 1943	3	0	Head-on collision with a steam engine and derailment of a cargo train at Halbstadt on the Silesian Mountain Railway. In the aftermath, the E91-96 electric locomotive had to be written off.
Porta Westfalica rail accident		20 January 1944	79	64+	Rear-end collision after signalling a "go ahead" to the following train too early.
Lichtenau rail accident	Zaręba	24 October 1944	?	?	During the Lichtenau train accident on the Silesian Mountain Railway, the D 192 Breslau – Berlin collided head-on with an electric suburban train at Lichtenau Station. The electric locomotive of the D 192, E18-15 (from Hirschberg (BW)), suffered total damage in the accident and was scrapped on site. The cause of the collision was never determined.
Bad Zwischenahn rail accident		19/20 November 1944	29		A train that was transporting, among other things, Dutch prisoners from the Rotterdam raid to Germany ran into another train at considerable speed.
Ludwigsdorf railway disaster	Ludwigsdorf	27 January 1945	60	3	Several rear carriages of a train became detached on a gradient, rolled uncontrollably downhill, were diverted onto a siding at Ludwigsdorf, broke through the buffer stop, plunged down an embankment, and caught fire.
Verne rail accident		31 March 1945	7+	?	Rear-end collision of two trains not using any train protection which was not working due to destruction by act of war in the last days of World War II.
Berg am Laim rail accident		8 May 1945	11	?	Explosion of ammunition train
Aßling rail accident		16 July 1945	102+	?	Due to faulty signaling and a poor decision by a traffic controller, a freight train rear-ended a passenger train which had stopped after a technical default.
Neddemin rail accident		4 December 1945	38	68	Head-on collision of two passenger trains due to a dismantled train protection system and a mistake by the train controller.
1946 Eisleben rail accident		16 April 1946	24	39	Train running on orders of Soviet occupying forces under the Soviet Military Administration in Germany but outside the rules securing movements of trains. This caused a rear-end collision of the train into a passenger train.
Neuwied rail accident		22 December 1947	42	116	Defective signalling due to shortages in the post-war era caused a head-on collision of two express trains.
BASF tank car explosion		28 July 1948	207	3818	A tank car, loaded with Dimethyl ether and parked within the industrial complex of BASF, leaked and exploded, releasing other chemicals. Most of the injured suffered from poisonous gases.
1948 Kaiser Wilhelm Tunnel rail accident		22 November 1948	0	2	After a coal dust explosion and fire on the steam engine of the express from Paris to Koblenz within Kaiser Wilhelm Tunnel, then the longest railway tunnel of Germany, the engineer managed to run the train out of the tunnel with the burning engine – not a single passenger was injured. Tunnel operating regulations were changed: pilot locomotives required a special permit, trains were to have a second locomotive as a pusher to prevent exhaust fumes from entering the drivers cab, carbide and petroleum lamps in the tunnel were banned, coal dust had to be swept out of driver cabs before entering the tunnel and the entire surface of coal in the tender had to be wetted.
Meiningen boiler explosion		4 May 1951	11	11	During repairs on a steam engine in Meiningen Steam Locomotive Works, the boiler was not supervised properly and exploded.
Kenn level crossing accident		10 June 1951	15	33	A train on the Moselbahn struck a bus at a confusing, unguarded crossing.
Herrsching level crossing accident		19 June 1951	16	7	Passenger train 3461 struck a truck carrying 22 Jesuits on a pilgrimage to Andechs Monastery. The crossing had a self-operating barrier and it had not been closed after the last person used it. After the accident, the crossing was closed and removed.
Walpertskirchen rail accident		8 November 1951	16	41	The station master of this little station, all on his own and occupied by multiple tasks, erroneously let two trains, coming from opposite directions, into his station on the same track. This resulted in a head-on collision.
1954 Hanau rail accident		27 April 1954	4	97	A regional train passed a red signal and hit into the side of the passing Scandinavia Express. The driver claimed that he saw a green signal; all signals would have anti-glare protection installed to prevent such an event.
Abenheim level crossing accident		24 July 1954	25	?	Level crossing accident
Bornitz rail accident		25 February 1956	43	55	Shunting freight train crashed into the side of a passing express.
Drachenfels rail accident		14 September 1958	18	112	Faulty braking of a descending train on the Drachenfels Railway, a rack railway, resulted in excessive speed and derailment.
Lauffen bus crash	Lauffen am Neckar	20 June 1959	45	25	After the barrier of a level crossing was not closed properly, a train hit a bus.
Leipzig rail accident		15 May 1960	54	240	To get a train over a blocked signal, workers at a signal box handed a written order to the engineer of the train, but forgot to put the points right. This led the train onto a wrong track on which another train was approaching, resulting in a head-on collision.
Esslingen rail accident		13 June 1961	35	36	Head-on collision of two trains after one of the drivers ignored a red signal.
Berliner Tor S-Bahn accident		5 October 1961	28	55	A train controller erroneously guided a suburban train onto a track blocked by a maintenance train, which led to a collision.
Trebbin rail accident		1 March 1962	70?	?	The tank turret of a Soviet army tank transported on a train came loose, and its gun smashed into an oncoming express passing on the parallel track.
Langhagen rail accident		1 November 1964	44	70	After the derailment of a freight train, a passing express ran into the debris of the first accident.
Lampertheim rail accident		12 August 1965	4	45	A freight train was pulled out of the main line to be overtaken by a following Trans Europ Express. But the last car of the freight train did not clear the loading gauge completely. The Express hit the car, and its locomotive and all the cars derailed and were badly damaged.
Langenweddingen level crossing disaster	Magdeburg	6 July 1967	94+	?	Level crossing accident: A passenger train hits a truck with a load of petrol which exploded. The train burned out.
Linden rail accident		22 June 1969	12	30	Explosion of a freight car loaded with ammunition.
Aitrang rail accident		9 February 1971	28	42	A Trans Europ Express derailed in a curve due to excessive speed. A railbus, approaching from the opposite direction, crashed into the wreckage.
Dahlerau train disaster	Dahlerau	27 May 1971	46	25	A freight train and a passenger train collided head-on after a misunderstanding between a traffic controller and an engineer.
Rheinweiler rail accident		21 July 1971	25	121	Engineer probably got incapacitated (he died in the accident) and the train derailed with excessive speed in a narrow curve.
Ingolstadt rail accident		2 March 1972	3	0	Rear-end crash of two freight trains, the front one loaded with oil, resulted in a blaze and large material damage.
Schweinsburg-Culten rail accident		30 October 1972	28	70	Train passing a red signal led to a head-on collision of two express trains.
Guntershausen rail accident		5 November 1973	14	65	Due to wet autumn weather the rails were covered with moisture, dirt and wet leaves. This caused such a bad braking performance that a train collided rear-end with another train standing.
Munich-Allach level crossing accident		7 March 1975	12	5	Level crossing accident
Warngau rail accident		8 June 1975	41	122	The misunderstanding of two traffic controllers and the nonexistence of technical train protection led to the head-on collision of two trains.
Hamburg-Hausbruch rail accident		22 July 1975	11	125	Local train ran a red signal, colliding head-on with a freight train.
Lebus train collision	Lebus	27 June 1977	31	7	Due to works re-signalling the station of Booßen, the point to the branch line to Frankfurt (Oder) was without any connection to the technical installations providing train protection and had to be handled manually. The person in charge of this erroneously switched it into the wrong direction, which led to the head-on collision of two trains.
Bitterfeld boiler explosion		27 November 1977	9	45	The boiler on locomotive 01 1516 exploded at Bitterfeld station due to lack of water while on its way to relieve express train D 567, whose locomotive had broken down. Last explosion of a steam engine boiler in Germany.
Erfurt-Bischleben rail accident		11 June 1981	14	102	Derailment of an express due to distortion of the track.
Heilbronn rail accident		12 August 1984	3	57	Excessive speed when crossing a point resulted in a derailment
Empelde rail accident		20 March 1985	0	0	Crash of two freight-trains. Explosion of several tank-cars loaded with petrol.
Forst Zinna rail disaster	Forst Zinna	19 January 1988	6	33	A Russian army tank ran onto a rail track and was hit by an express.
Heiligenberg Tunnel rail accident		28 June 1988	1	38	A freight train derailed after running into a landslide in the entrance of Heiligenberg Tunnel, its locomotive standing in the loading gauge of the track for trains running in opposite direction. An oncoming passenger train hit it and it too derailed.
Rüsselsheim train disaster	Rüsselsheim am Main	2 February 1990	17	145	An S-Bahn suburban service overran a red signal, leading to a head-on collision with an oncoming train.
Northeim rail accident		15 November 1992	11	51	A buffer fell from a freight train, causing 14 cars to derail, some of them standing within the loading gauge of the rail for trains coming from the opposite direction. The express from Copenhagen to Innsbruck ran into these cars.
Holthusen rail accident		31 December 1992	1	9	Due to a mistake by a traffic controller, a shunting engine came in the way of an approaching express train, followed by a collision.
Berlin-Wannsee rail accident		9 April 1993	3	49	Wrongly set points led to a head-on collision.
Bad Bramstedt rail accident		29 September 1994	6	80	A DMU entered a single-track line without permission and collided with an oncoming one.
Garmisch-Partenkirchen train collision	Garmisch-Partenkirchen	12 December 1995	1	51	A passenger train overran a stop-signal and crashed into DB 491 001-4 "Glass Train", an EMU for sightseeing purposes, very famous with railway enthusiasts. It was the last of two of these vehicles and damaged beyond repair in this accident. 491 001 has been under restoration since 2005, but due to economic reasons, it will never run again.
1996 Schönebeck rail accident		1 June 1996	0	18	A train transporting vinyl chloride in 18 tank cars derailed on an outworn point. One of the cars topped another, hitting a 15000 volt overhead power line. This caused an explosion of the vinyl chloride in this car, and four more cars caught fire. It was one of the worst rail accidents in Germany involving hazardous goods.
Frankfurt (Main) Süd rail accidents		19 February 1997	0	0	Mix-up of two neighbouring signals by an engineer at the station of Frankfurt (Main) Süd which is placed in the inner city of Frankfurt. This caused the collision of two freight trains followed by the explosion of a car carrying petrol. A similar accident had happened in 1996 at this location, but without serious consequences.
Neustadt (Hessen) rail accident		5 July 1997	6	14	Loose steel pipes rolling off a passing freight train hit an oncoming passenger service.
Elsterwerda train disaster	Elsterwerda	20 November 1997	2	8	A freight train loaded with petrol derailed due to malfunctioning brakes, followed by a vast explosion causing widespread damage.
Hanover-Anderten rail accident		9 December 1997	0	51	A freight train overran a red signal and crashed head-on into an oncoming passenger train. Some of the derailed cargo cars loaded with diesel fuel ignited.
Eschede train disaster	Eschede	3 June 1998	101	194	An ICE high-speed train derailed after a fatigue crack in one wheel and crashed into a road bridge. It remains the worst rail disaster in the history of the Federal Republic of Germany.
1999 Wuppertal Schwebebahn accident	Wuppertal	12 April 1999	5	47	Workers forgot to remove a metal claw from the track on completion of scheduled night work. The first train of the day hit the claw, derailed and fell about 10 metres into the river Wupper.
Brühl train derailment	Bruhl	6 February 2000	9	149	A train negotiated a low speed turnout at three times the correct speed and derailed.
Katzenstein Tunnel rail accident		10 June 2000	0	59	A misunderstanding between two traffic controllers led to the head-on collision of two trains of the Bavarian Zugspitze Railway, a rack-railway, within a tunnel.
Vilseck level crossing accidents		22 June 2001	4+3	16+19	At a level crossing in Dillingen, a train crashed into a car and derailed. The 4 people in the car died and 16 people on the train suffered minor injuries. Hours earlier, 2 German troops and a U.S soldier were killed, and another soldier was seriously injured when a train coming from Weiden struck their army truck. 18 people on the train suffered minor injuries.
Bad Münder rail accident		9 September 2002	0	2	Head-on collision of two freight trains due to a disconnected braking pipe on one of the trains. 40000 litres of highly inflammable and carcinogen epichlorohydrin were released.
Schrozberg rail accident		11 June 2003	6	25	Mistakes of two traffic controllers, combined with faulty signaling equipment, caused a head-on collision of two passenger trains.
Süßen train collision	Süßen	21 April 2004	1	6	An empty passenger train collided with a track geometry car on the Fils Valley Railway. The driver of the passenger train was killed, while the crew of the track geometry car was injured.
München-Berg am Laim train collision	München-Berg am Laim	8 May 2004	0	68	An S-Bahn collided with a construction train after the driver of the construction train ignored stop signals. 68 passengers were injured.
Haldenwang level crossing accident	Haldenwang	26 April 2005	1	15	A Regional Express train operated by DB Regio using a DB BR 612 collided with a paver on the Neu-Ulm–Kempten Railway. The train driver was killed, and 15 passengers were injured.
Lathen train collision	Lathen	22 September 2006	23	10	The Transrapid, an experimental maglev train, crashed into a maintenance vehicle. This was the first serious accident with a maglev train worldwide.
Landrücken Tunnel train accident	Landrücken Tunnel	26 April 2008	0	38	ICE 885, operated by DB Fernverkehr, collided with a herd of sheep in the Landrücken Tunnel at a speed of approximately 210 km/h. The train driver applied the emergency brake five seconds after the collision, the train came to a stop 26 seconds later. Of the 14 carriages, 12 derailed as a result of the collision. 38 people, including the driver, were injured. The tunnel was fully reopened on 16 June 2008.
Dillenburg train collision	Dillenburg	5 November 2008	0	1	A tank train collided with a car transporter train transporting new Porsche cars at Dillenburg Station. The driver of the tank train was injured. The collision was caused by an error of the train dispatcher.
Berlin-Karow train collision	Karow	16 April 2009	0	13	Regional Express train 38399, operated by DB Regio, collided with freight train FTZ 53185 at Berlin Karow station. The collision was caused by an error of the train dispatcher. Twelve people, including the train driver of the passenger train, were injured. The dispatcher in shock and was taken to a hospital.
Friedewald train collision	Friedewald	12 September 2009	0	52	Collision of two steam-hauled narrow-gauge museum trains. One had left a station without permission.
Braunschweig-Rüningen level crossing accident	Rüningen	20 January 2010	0	16	A Regionalbahn, operated by DB Regio using a DB BR 628, collided with a truck that was stuck on a level crossing. The motor unit 628 621 was heavily damaged.
Peine-Horst train derailment and collision	Peine-Horst	16 June 2010	0	20	A wheel tire of the 10th car of a freight train (two engines and 49 freight cars) got loose, so this car and the following eight derailed, some obstructing the parallel track. A Regional Express passenger train (engine and five double-deck cars) from the opposite direction hit the freight cars after a short time. The RE's leading three vehicles derailed, and the first two fell on their sides. The freight train had been stopped earlier due to observation of sparks, but the reason was not found, so the train continued. The damage was estimated at €5,360,500.
Lambrecht train accident	Lambrecht	17 August 2010	0	15	An ICE 3 operated by DB Fernverkehr collided with a garbage truck on the Mannheim–Saarbrücken Railway. Fifteen passengers, including the train driver, were injured. The truck driver was able to jump out of the truck shortly before the collision.
Hordorf train collision	Oschersleben	29 January 2011	10	100	A freight train overran a red signal and collided head-on with a DMU. The freight train's driver failed to react to the distant and the main signal in foggy conditions, and there was no PZB safety system installed (on the infrastructure) that would have stopped the train in time.
Langenhorn train derailment	Langenhorn	13 January 2012	1	0	A train operated by Nord-Ostsee-Bahn collided with a herd of cattle on its way to Bredstedt. The train derailed, and one passenger was killed.
Mühlheim am Main train collision	Mühlheim	13 April 2012	3	14	A road-rail vehicle was rerailed on a track that had not been closed. A Regionalbahn, operated by DB Regio, using the track at the same time collided with the vehicle. Two construction workers and the train driver were killed, while 14 passengers on the train were injured.
2012 Stuttgart derailments	Stuttgart	24 July 2012; 29 September 2012; 10 October 2012	0	8	Three InterCity trains derailed in Stuttgart Hauptbahnhof, at the same place and for the same reasons.
Hosena rail accident	Hosena	26 July 2012	1	2	Non-functioning brakes on a freight train loaded with gravel let it pass two signals at danger and subsequently to a side-on collision with another freight train. In the resulting crash, one of the signal boxes of Hosena station was completely destroyed.
Bremen Hauptbahnhof train derailment	Bremen	5 September 2013	0	4	A railroad switch was moved underneath a moving train at Bremen Hauptbahnhof. As a result, part of the train derailed. Four people were injured.
Gladbeck train collision	Gladbeck	26 October 2013	0	1	The brakes on freight train DGS 89025 failed to operate properly because a shut-off valve on the brake system's compressed air line was closed. The train was unable to stop in front of a red signal and collided with another freight train (XP 63174). The driver of the DGS train jumped off the train shortly before the collision and was seriously injured.
Mannheim train collision	Mannheim	1 August 2014	0	39	Inside of Mannheim main station, a freight train passed a main signal at danger (red "halt" aspect) and was stopped by the PZB safety system. Instead of asking for permission to proceed, the driver restarted the train on his own, then passed two more signals (not guarded by PZB) at danger, so his train hit the side of a EuroCity long distance train.
Ibbenbüren train collision	Ibbenbüren	16 May 2015	2	41	A WestfalenBahn passenger train travelling from Osnabrück was in collision with a tractor and trailer that were obstructing a level crossing at Ibbenbüren
Engelsbach railway accident	Egelsbach	30 June 2015	1	1	After issues with the engine thrust, a DA 20 Katana departing from Egelsbach Airport (a small airport near Frankfurt) collided with an overhead line pylon. The pylon bent, and the plane crashed onto a freight train on the Main-Neckar Railway. An S-Bahn train on the other track was able to apply the emergency brake and stopped before the plane. The plane caught fire. Burning aircraft parts were hurled onto the railway embankment, where a fire broke out on the slope. The pilot was seriously injured, his wife was killed.
Buxtehude level crossing accident	Buxtehude	16 September 2015	0	3	A school bus became stuck on a level crossing on the Lower Elbe Railway and was struck by a regional train operated by Metronom Eisenbahnverkehrsgesellschaft. The train driver was able to apply the emergency brake, reducing the train's speed from 138 km/h to 45 km/h. Three passengers of the train were injured, while the bus was safely evacuated before the collision. One of the passengers filmed the collision.
Freihung level crossing accident	Freihung	5 November 2015	2	19	A Regional Express train (DB BR 612) collided on the Neukirchen–Weiden Railway with a truck at a speed of 145 km/h. The train driver and one of the truck's occupants were killed, 19 passengers of the train were injured. A similar accident accured on the same railway in 2001 already, see also Vilseck level crossing accident.
Bad Aibling rail accident	Bad Aibling	9 February 2016	12	85	Two regional trains hit each other head-on on the bend on the Mangfall Valley Railway. The traffic controller was distracted by a smartphone online game, violated safety procedures and ordered the driver of one of the trains to override safety mechanisms.
Leipzig Engelsdorf train accident	Engelsdorf	20 October 2016	0	1	A shunting train collided with a signal box in the Leipzig-Engelsdorf marshalling yard. One train dispatcher was injured.
Leese-Stolzenau train collision	Leese-Stolzenau	30 June 2017	0	2	Freight train 42575, operated by Hector rail, collided on the single-track Nienburg–Minden railway with freight train 42597, operated by Lineas. The dispatcher forgot about one of the trains (42575) which was waiting on the track and gave train 42597 access to the occupied track. Both drivers were injured.
Meerbusch-Osterath train collision	Meerbusch	5 December 2017	0	47	A Regional Express train, operated by National Express Germany using a Talent 2 train and driving as line RE 7, collided with freight train 95307, operated by RheinCargo. The train dispatcher confused several train numbers and gave RE 7 access to a track occupied by train 95307. After noticing the freight train ahead of him, the driver of the passenger train applied the emergency brake and warned the passengers.
Aichach train collision	Aichach	7 May 2018	2	13	A regional train, operated by Bayerische Regiobahn using a Lint train, collided with freight train 98907, operated by Salzburger Eisenbahn Transportlogistik (SETG). The driver of the passenger train as well as a 73 year old passenger were killed, 13 passengers were injured. The train dispatcher routed the passenger train onto the wrong track and noticed the error too late, resulting in a collision.
Engen train collision	Engen	6 June 2018	0	0	A regional train, operated by SBB GmbH, collided with a flock of sheep numbering around 450 animals. 49 sheep were killed.
Dierdorf train fire	Dierdorf	12 October 2019	0	5	A carriage of ICE train 511, operated by DB Fernverkehr, caught fire. The cause was a damaged transformer mounting bracket which led to short circuits that caused the transformer oil to heat up and ignite, starting the fire. During the evacuation, five people were injured.
Alt Duvenstedt level crossing accident	Alt Duvenstedt	8 May 2019	0	25	A Twindexx Vario, operated by DB Regio for Nahverkehrsverbund Schleswig-Holstein (NAH.SH), collided with a truck at a level crossing. 25 passengers were injured.
Berlin Zoologischer Garten train fire	Berlin	19 October 2019	0	4	Shortly after the departure of train DPE 86363, the second carriage caught fire. The train was evacuated at a Berlin Bellevue station, and four people were injured.
Munich Hackerbrücke rail accident	Munich	22 November 2019	0	1	Two wagons have derailed shortly after leaving the Munich train station. Approximately 100 passengers were evacuated, one person was slightly injured. The cause of the derailment is still being investigated.
Frankfurt main station rail accident	Frankfurt a.M.	20 January 2020	0	5	Train 4171 from Kassel, operated by DB Regio, collided with a buffer stop at Frankfurt am Main Hauptbahnhof. As a result of the accident, five people, including the train attendant, were injured.
Auggen train accident	Auggen	2 April 2020	1	10	A freight train operated by SBB Cargo International collided with a concrete segment weighing over 100 tonnes, which had fallen onto the tracks shortly beforehand during demolition work on a bridge. The driver of the train was killed, and 10 passengers were injured.
Hamminkeln level crossing accident	Hamminkeln	24 April 2020	3	N/A	An Alstom Coradia Lint train operated by Abellio as Regionalbahn 32 on the Bocholt-Wesel Railway collided with a car at a level crossing. All three people in the car were killed, including the 81-year-old driver.
Eichenberg overhead line accident	Eichenberg	22 June 2020	0	2	A train operated by Cantus Verkehrsgesellschaft collided with the overhead line torn down due to a bird. The driver as well as one passenger of the train were injured.
Haslach train fire	Haslach	9 July 2020	0	0	A service train (DB BR 711.1) caught fire while working on the overhead line on the Black Forest Railway. As a result of the fire, a brake hose burst and the train started to roll. The driver attempted to stop the train, but was unable to do so and jumped from the train while it was travelling at a low speed because he was unable to do so. In order to stop the train, the dispatcher decided to derail it using a derailer in Gengenbach.
Niederlahnstein train derailment	Niederlahnstein	30 August 2020	0	1	The driver of freight train DGS 49077, operated by Hupac AG using a Siemens Vectron, ignored an instruction given by a signal and passed a railroad switch at excessive speed. As a result of this action, the train derailed at Niederlahnstein station. The railway infrastructure sustained major damage.
Gomadingen level crossing accident	Gomadingen	15 January 2021	0	2	A train operated by Schwäbische-Alb-Bahn collided with a truck on a level crossing on the Reutlingen-Schelklingen Railway. The train driver and attendant were injured. Usually, approximately 50 schoolchildren would have been on the train at the time, but were not allowed to attend school due to measures introduced in response to the coronavirus pandemic.
Ebenhausen-Schäftlarn rail accident	Ebenhausen-Schäftlarn	14 February 2022	1	57	On a single-track section of the Munich S-Bahn, a train departed from a station against a red signal and passed it at danger. Despite being tripped by the PZB, the driver restarted his train and subsequently collided head-on with an oncoming train.
Dieburg train collision	Dieburg	19 May 2022	1	0	Due to a mistake made by the train dispatcher, two freight trains collided on the Rhine–Main Railway. One train driver was killed in the accident.
Burgrain train derailment	Burgrain	3 June 2022	5	68	Double-decker regional train derailed on a curved embankment, north of Garmisch-Partenkirchen station, near Burgrain.
Rastede level crossing accident	Rastede	3 August 2022	1	0	A regional train operated by NordWestBahn on the Wilhelmshaven-Oldenburg Railway collided with a truck at a level crossing. The truck driver ignored instructions given by construction workers and entered the crossing. Fifty passengers on the train suffered a shock but were not injured, the truck driver was killed.
Usedom level crossing accident	Usedom	27 September 2022	0	10	A passenger train operated by Usedomer Bäderbahn collided with a truck on a level crossing near Koserow. The truck drove onto the level crossing despite the half-barriers being down and the traffic lights showing a red signal. Ten of the fifteen passengers on the train were injured.
Leiferde train collision	Leiferde	17 November 2022	0	1	Following an error by the train dispatcher after a problem with the LZB line centre, freight train 42593 collided with freight train 90977 near the city of Gifhorn on the Berlin–Lehrte Railway. Railway traffic on the line resumed after more than three weeks.
Halle (Saale) train accident	Halle (Saale)	2 December 2022	1	3	A single locomotive drove into a group of construction workers during a snowstorm in the morning. One worker died, and three others were injured.
Geseke train derailment	Geseke	10 September 2023	1	0	A 14-wagon-long freight train derailed on the Geseke–Büren Railway near Geseke. The accident was caused by a series of mistakes, which ultimately led to the torque converter exploding. The railway line was closed for more than a month.
Itzehoe train collision	Itzehoe	3 November 2023	0	23	A locomotive (DB BR 101) collided with an Intercity train in Itzehoe during a locomotive change on the Marsh Railway. Twenty-one passengers were injured, and the train was heavily damaged.
Reichertshausen train collision	Reichertshausen	17 November 2023	0	7	A Regional-Express train operated by DB Regio Bayern collided with an ICE train after passing a red signal on the Munich–Treuchtlingen railway. Seven passengers were injured.
Ahrensfelde train fire	Ahrensfelde	2 November 2024	0	0	For an unknown reason, a diesel rail car started burning in the Ahrensfelde train station in Berlin. However, no injuries have been reported. Officials have temporarily suspended rail traffic, and have not estimated, when it will resume.
Kerpen train collision	Kerpen	22 November 2024	0	3	A cargo train collided with a construction train on the Cologne–Aachen railway line. The locomotive of the freight train overturned. Three people, including the train driver, were injured. The collision caused major damage to the railway infrastructure.
Hamburg train collision	Hamburg	11 February 2025	1	25	An ICE train rammed a truck on a crossing outside Hamburg, resulting in 25 injuries and the death of German historian and theologian Thomas Grossbölting.
Zeutern level crossing accident	Zeutern	11 March 2025	3	11	A city tram operated by Albtal-Verkehrs-Gesellschaft collided with a truck on a level crossing. The tram collided with the side of the truck and pushed it 40 metres along the tracks before coming to a stop. As a result of the crash, both vehicles caught fire. Three persons were killed, while 11 others were injured.
Riedlingen train derailment	Riedlingen	25 July 2025	3	41	An Regional-Express train operated by DB Regio, numbered 3227, derailed in Zell near Riedlingen. A rainwater drain overflowed, triggering a landslide. The mud came to rest on the tracks at a blind bend. When the train collided with it, it derailed and became stuck between several trees.
Ahaus level crossing accident	Ahaus	30 September 2025	1	5	A regional train (DB BR 643) operated by DB Regio NRW collided with an ambulance that had stopped on the level crossing due to a medical emergency involving the patient. As a result of the collision, all three paramedics, as well as the train driver and one passenger in the train were injured. The patient died.
Elze train derailment	Elze	23 December 2025	0	0	An ore train derailed near Elze on the Hanoverian Southern Railway. The derailment caused damage to the railway infrastructure over a distance of more than five kilometres. Another locomotive which travelling in the opposite direction on the line got damaged by loose gravel.
Hamburg-Wilhelmsburg train accident	Wilhelmsburg	18 January 2026	1	10	A bus operated by Hamburger Hochbahn collided with a shunting locomotive, DB BR 261, operated by DB Cargo. The crash left ten people injured and one dead. The bus was severely damaged in the crash.
Bayreuth train collision	Bayreuth	11 March 2026	0	8	A regional train operated by Agilis collided with a shunting train operated by Agilis at Bayreuth main station. Eight people, including one train driver, were injured.
2026 Munich train collision	Munich	20 June 2026	1	0	Two freight trains collided, derailed, and partially fell over a bridge.
