= Hugstetten rail disaster =

1882 rail disaster in Germany

Coordinates: 48°2′0.5″N 7°48′16″E

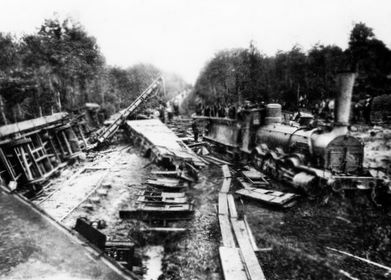
- The accident site.

Details
- Date: 3 September 1882
- Location: Hugstetten
- Country: German Empire
- Line: Freiburg–Colmar
- Operator: Grand Duchy of Baden State Railway
- Incident type: Derailment
- Cause: Washaway

Statistics
- Trains: 1
- Passengers: ca. 1,200
- Deaths: 64
- Injured: 230

The Hugstetten rail disaster occurred on the railway line between Freiburg im Breisgau and Breisach am Rhein on 3 September 1882. With 64 people killed and some 230 seriously injured, it was the deadliest train accident in German history until the collision of two D-Trains in the Genthin rail disaster on 21 December 1939, which claimed 278 casualties.

== The Accident ==
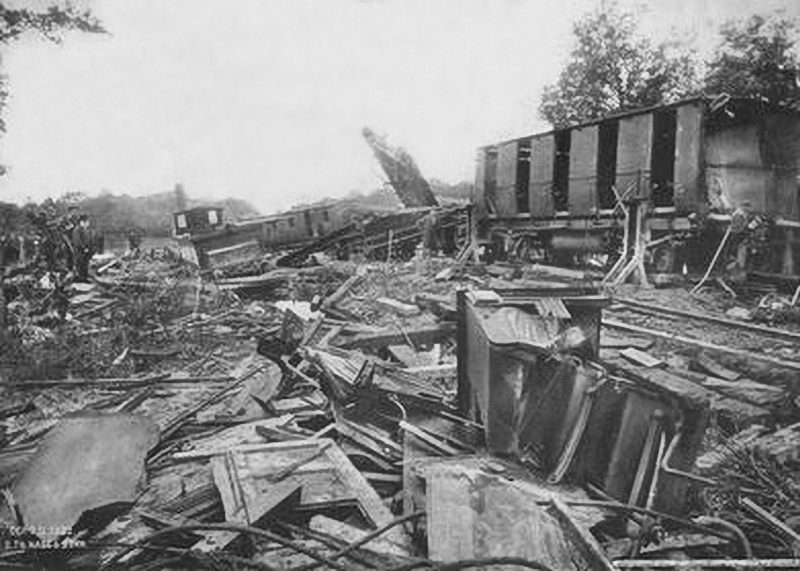
The accident site

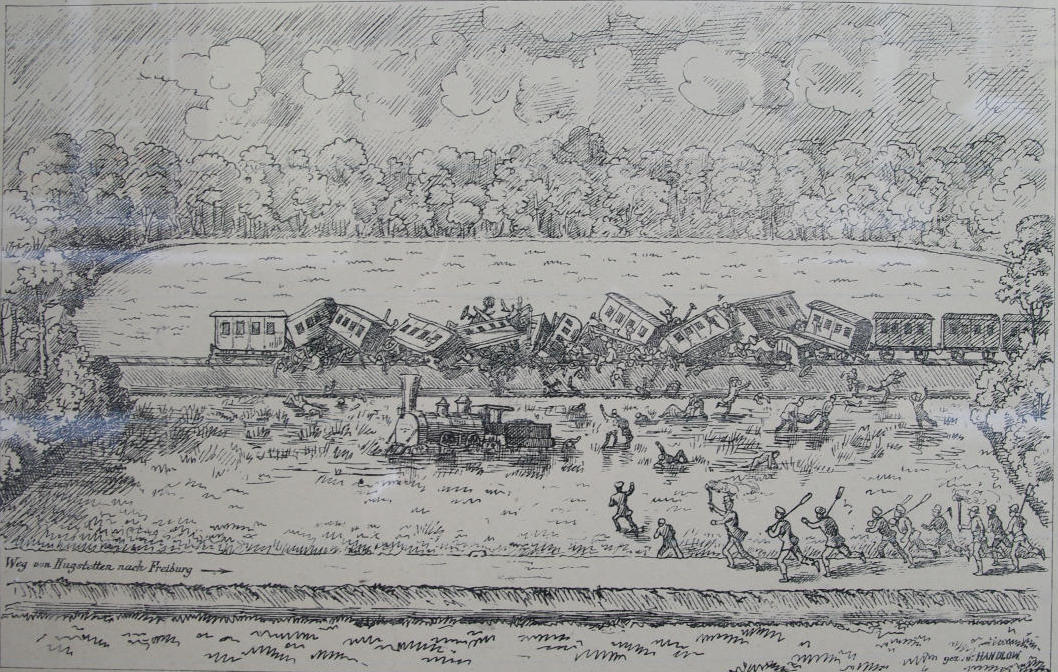
A drawing by a witness of the accident site and rescuers heading for the site

The accident occurred on a railway line between Freiburg and Breisach that had been opened on 14 September 1871. The line had been lengthened across the river Rhine to Colmar in 1878.

On 3 September, which was the Sunday after the "Day of Sedan", more than 2,000 people from Alsace (which belonged to Germany after the Franco-Prussian War) had come to Freiburg to spend a relaxing holiday in the neighboring town. At 8 p.m., the train was scheduled to return to Colmar. During the evening, an intense storm and rain had occurred in Freiburg, and the water had probably undermined the rails at the Mooswald Forest, west of Freiburg. Due to the rain, the train's departure was delayed, and when it finally was underway it was carrying some 1,200 persons in 28 wagons. The driver was probably speeding somewhat to make up for the lost time and the train was traveling as fast as 70 km/h.

When the driver noticed a washaway and tried to brake without the help of a brakeman, the inertia of the pushing railroad cars forced 25 wooden railroad cars to derail into swampy terrain. Only three cars remained on the tracks.

The first witness was the driver of a train from Breisach. He brought help to the scene and went back to his train station. From the rubble of the devastated train, the helpers dug out 64 people who had been killed. Several entire families had been killed. About 230 persons survived the accident but with serious injuries, and five later died from their injuries. Horse-drawn and manually pulled carts brought helpers to the site and took the injured to the nearby villages Hugstetten, Hochdorf and Lehen, and in the morning, the last dead and injured were recovered. Because the telegraphic cable line had been damaged, the Freiburg fire department arrived first at midnight at the accident site.

== The question of guilt ==
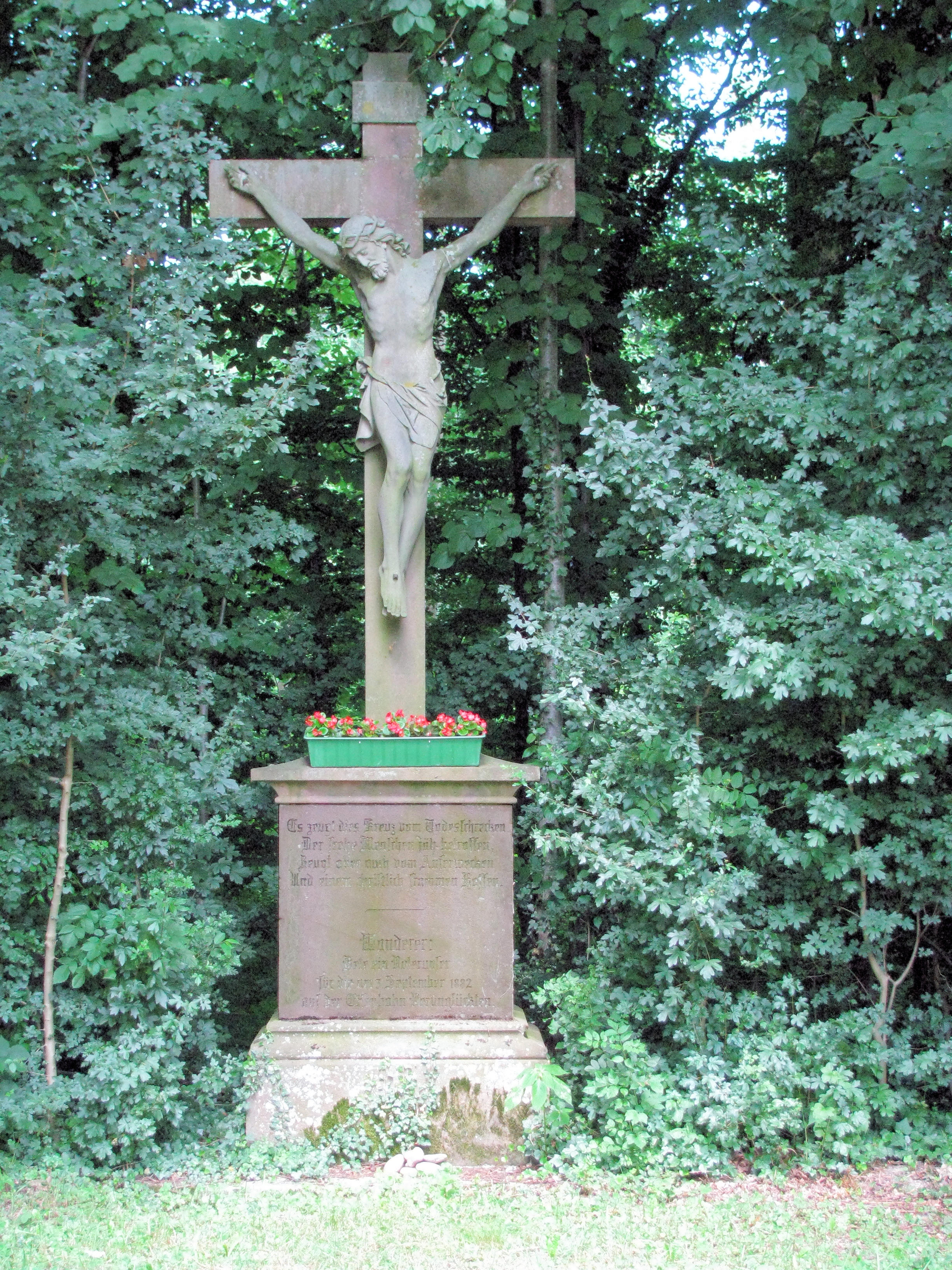
Memorial cross

In April 1883, the chief inspector of the railways, an engineer, the train driver, a car guard and a station assistant were indicted before the Grand Criminal Court of the Freiburg Regional Court.

As the exact circumstances and pace of the train couldn't be determined due to conflicting testimonies (the speed control was yet to be developed), and since all the defendants claimed their innocence, all of the accused were freed after five days of negotiations.

== Aftermath ==
The disaster sent the German empire into a period of mourning: flags were flown at half-mast and public events were cancelled. The victims were transferred to their home communities in Alsace and buried there. Five corpses were laid to rest in Freiburg.

Trains, such as the one involved here (a Type X c, named "Kniebis"), were afterwards given anonymous numbers, as to try to avoid the creation of "unlucky" trains.

The locomotive involved in the accident was damaged only slightly and was repaired. Many passengers, however, refused to board the cars and adjacent lanes, and many landowners refused to let the locomotive to pass over their property.

In 1885, a simple memorial cross was built near the site of the disaster.
