= 1851 Avenwedde rail accident =

First German railroad accident with multiple fatalities

Coordinates: 51°56′21″N 8°26′16″E

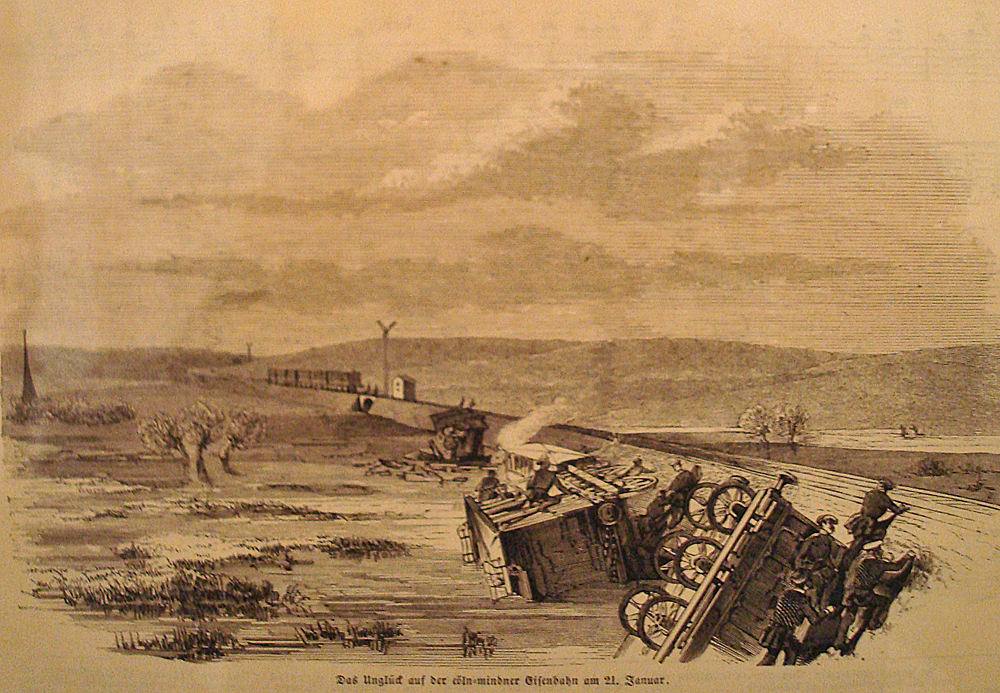
- Drawing of the accident

Details
- Date: January 21, 1851
- Location: near Gütersloh, German Confederation
- Incident type: Derailment
- Cause: Unsteady weight balance of engine combined with excessive speed

Statistics
- Trains: 1
- Deaths: 3
- Injured: unknown

The 1851 Avenwedde rail accident was a train derailment that occurred near Gütersloh, German Confederation on January 21 of that year.

== Background ==
In 1848, the "Münster", a steam engine, was designed and built specifically for the Cologne railway. The distance between the axles and the wheelbases combined with the weight distribution of the engine and boiler caused a natural oscillation as the engine would travel. In 1851, this type of locomotive was being used during the fatal incident.

== Accident ==
On January 21, 1851, a train carrying Prince Friedrich Wilhelm was traveling near Gütersloh. As it passed through Avenwedde, 3 kilometres (1.9 mi) away from Gütersloh, the engine began to wobble. The train then fully derailed, taking several coaches with it. Prince Wilhelm was among the injured, but survived. 3 people would die as a result of the accident. Among the dead were two crew members of the train, as well as well as a US secretary named John B. Arden who died while attempting to leap from his tipping carriage, only to be crushed as a result. It was the first German rail accident to result in multiple fatalities.

== Aftermath ==
On June 21, 1865, the municipality of Avenwedde erected a memorial both in memorial of the lives lost in the accident, but also with gratitude that Prince Wilhelm had survived the ordeal. The memorial was placed at the site of the accident.

The Münster-class locomotives would also be redesigned as a result of the crash. The driving wheels of the engine would be expanded an additional five feet in diameter to a length around 14 feet and 2 inches to counteract the weight of the engine body. This redesign also made the engines run more efficiently.
