= Lebus train collision =

1977 train collision in GDR

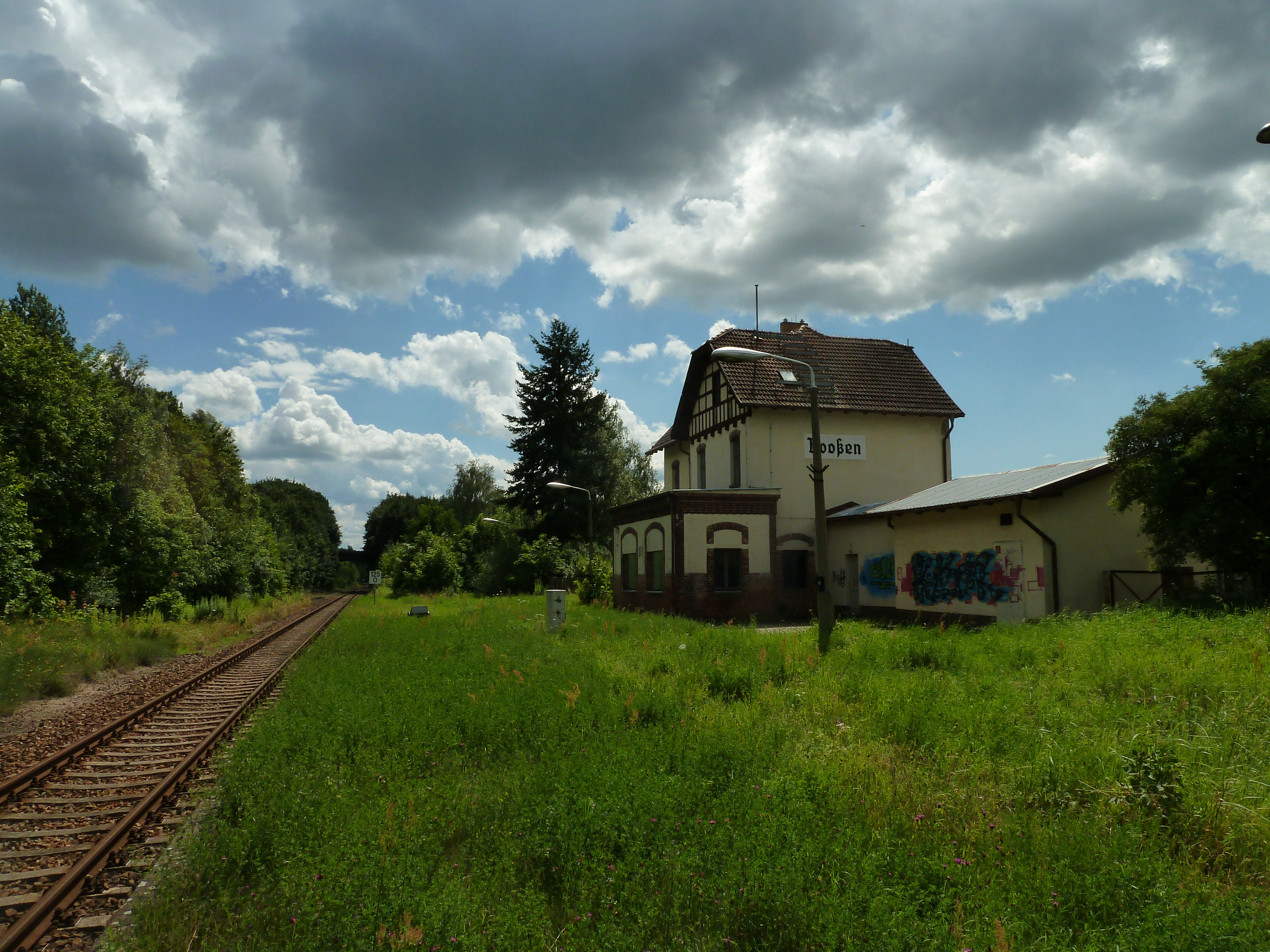
- Former Booßen railway station, with the disused station building in the background

- Location within German Democratic Republic

Details
- Date: 27 June 1977; 20:41 CET (21:21 UTC)
- Location: Booßen, Brandenburg
- Coordinates: 52°22′20″N 14°29′11″E
- Country: German Democratic Republic
- Line: Küstrin-Kietz-Frankfurt (Oder) railway
- Operator: East German railway
- Incident type: Head-on collision
- Cause: Human error

Statistics
- Trains: 2
- Passengers: 200+
- Deaths: 29
- Injured: 7

On 27 June 1977, a head-on collision occurred between two trains Booßen railway station in Lebus, in then East Germany. The resulting head-on collision between two trains killed 29 people.

== Background ==
Booßen railway station was on the Küstrin-Kietz–Frankfurt line, branching off from the Eberswalde–Frankfurt line. The station only had two railway tracks, with limited sidings and no passing loop on a single track line. The line had been signalled after the war, as part of war reparations to the Soviet Union. Even after the signalling system was rebuilt in 1974, there was still no station block dependency between the exit signals and the switches. The train dispatcher, whose workplace was in the reception building, had no way of checking the position of the northern exit switches. Instead, a switchman was on duty, who was informed of the required route setting by the train dispatcher over the phone and reported the correct position of the switch to the train dispatcher, whereupon the dispatcher set the exit signal to go. The switchman had a key device at his disposal to assist him in this task, which enabled him to check the correct switch position, but did not offer any active security. The switchman who was responsible that night had already been on duty for 12 hours.

The holiday express train D 1918 was travelling northbound from Zittau via Cottbus and Frankfurt (Oder) to Stralsund on the Baltic coast. At 23:30 D 1918 is listed as on schedule between Cottbus to Frankfurt as passengers were settling down to sleep. The service reached Frankfurt just after midnight, where both the engine and crew changed. The service would from here be pulled by the oil-fired steam locomotive 03 0078, a 23.9m/78.5 feet long oil fired express train steam engine weighing 177 metric tons including its tender and oil/water loads. Without the tender and "dry" it weighed 92.7 metric tons. The oil-fired version had been constructed in 1965 using 17 locomotives. The locomotives were the star of the DR's high-class express trains at the time, and ran up mileages as high as 22000km/13670mi per month, reaching speeds of up to 140kph/87mph. The locomotive crew, led by Mr. Goletzke with Mr. Mickelun acting as stoker, were working on this section of route for the first time. Though experienced railwaymen, they had insufficient route knowledge, which would have included driving the connection three times, at least once at night. In fact, their crew had only been on the road for this purpose once, during the day in a tour railcar. This was locomotive driver Goletzke's sixth independent trip on this section, the fourth for stoker Mickelun, and it was a night journey. It is unknown what number of previous journeys had taken place at night.

At the same time, the southbound through freight train DG 50101 from Kietz towards Booßen bound for Frankfurt (Oder), was on the Küstrin-Kietz–Frankfurt (Oder) line 17 kilometres (11 mi) north of Lebus. Pulled by the diesel locomotive 132 200, it carried different kinds of solid cargo including large amounts of paper in the two forward cars. Pulling the train was a 1975 Soviet built DR 132 200, a heavy six-axle diesel locomotive adapted from the near-identical series 130 specifically to pull passenger trains, possessing the systems for electric heating of a passenger train. The series 132 (later renumbered 232 after integration into the DB), nicknamed "Ludmilla", it weighed in at 124 metric tons at 20.8m/68ft long and could reach up to 120 kilometres per hour (75 mph). Its driver, Werner Grund. had worked on the railways for over 29 years. He was assisted by an engineer.

Parked at Booßen station was DG 61180, a set of freight cars that had been stored on Track 2 as its nearby destination was at capacity. The unknown locomotive had been uncoupled and was to return to Frankfurt (Oder) once D 1918 had passed through. Booßen station had two tracks in a north-south orientation. Track 2 would carry northbound trains straight through the station and then towards Eberswalde on the mainline, while track 4 turned into the branch line if trains did not use the points 4 (for going straight). The northbound train had to use the siding (track 4) to pass through Booßen station and re-join the main line north of the station. Leaving Booßen station on the branch line (passing points number 1) there would be no further connection. Neither railway had a block-section system to keep trains at a distance or any ability to stop a train running a red signal. Train drivers had to rely on their knowledge of the routes as well as have professional trust in the signal box crews.

== Collision ==
At approximately 00:41, express train D 1918 was mistakenly routed onto the Küstrin-Kietz–Frankfurt line branchline, as track 2 was occupied by DG 61180. When a locomotive train arrived from the direction of Kietz, the switchman set the appropriate switch for this entry into the unoccupied track 4. However, he left another switch, which acted as a protective switch for this and which represented the branch for the track coming from Eberswalde to enter track 2 or 4 of the station, in the position of track 4 to Eberswalde, as was necessary for the expected journey of the D 1918. It is uncertain to what extent he registered the locomotive train passing his signalman's house; in any case, he seems to have fallen asleep at his post. When the call from the dispatcher woke him up announcing the express train, he did not set any switches at all, having forgotten that the locomotive train had passed from the direction of Kietz, and assuming that the switches for the journey to Eberswalde had been set correctly. One switch was also in the correct position, but the switch that decided whether to travel to Kietz or Eberswalde was not. The switchman reported that the route to Stralsund had been set without carrying out the required route check at the keyworks. Based on this report, the dispatcher set the exit signal to "clear to travel". The crew of D 1918 also failed to notice that they had been directed onto the wrong route, due to a lack of route knowledge. The green signal for the upline confirmed to the D 1918 crew that they had right-of-way, and they proceeded in the mistaken belief that they were on a main line. They sped up to around 100 kilometres per hour (62 mph). Because the route block was missing, nether train could be stopped at this point.

Foggy weather conditions further reduced visibility, limiting the time available for either crew to respond. It was not until the slower freight train turned a bend and both drivers could see the approaching headlamps or each other's trains that any action was taken. Werner Grund, the driver of DG 50101, seeing the passenger locomotive approaching, applied the emergency brakes and ordered his engineer to jump before jumping out of the cab himself, breaking his foot in the process. Due to the excessive speed of about 100 kilometres per hour (62 mph) from the express train, a collision could not be avoided. It is unclear what actions, if any, Goletzke and Mickelun took, as they were killed in the crash, as was Werner Grund's engineer, who died in the driver's cab as it was crushed. Both locomotives and the first carriages of both trains were destroyed. The steam locomotive came to a stop suddenly and was pushed up on a 40 degree angle. The first carriage of its train was pushed under the tender, which completely crushed it. The tender jacked itself up and crushed the driver's cab. The second passenger carriage of the express train was half collapsed.

Police officer Dieter Zingel was the first on the scene. As many passengers were unclear as to where they were, he informed them they were in Lebus. Burkhard Hübscher, a local resident of Lebus (and whose house overlooked the crash), later recalled in an interview the shock at the complete destruction of both train engines and offered what help he could.

== Victims ==
26 passengers died on the express train, many of them children from the Zittau district on their way to a company holiday camp on the Baltic Sea, as well as both train crews and the engineer from DG 50101. The collision resulted therefore in 29 fatalities and left several passengers injured. Those in the front carriages experienced the most severe impact. Local hospitals managed the influx of injured passengers, though the scale of the incident stretched resources.

== Investigation ==
An investigation by East German railway authorities attributed the accident primarily to a routing error made by a signalman. Contributing factors included limited visibility and the absence of automated fail-safes that could have prevented the manual routing error. The investigation report outlined these limitations and recommended updates to the safety systems to reduce human error.

== Aftermath ==
The collision caused significant structural damage to the passenger carriages at the front of the train, complicating the subsequent rescue operations. The fog and location further delayed emergency response teams. Following the investigation, East German rail authorities implemented multiple reforms, including installing automated signal controls in certain areas and enforcing additional safety checks under low-visibility conditions. The accident also highlighted the need for improved emergency response protocols for railway incidents. The damage caused by the incident amounted to 4 million marks. The dispatcher was jailed for five years for his part in the crash.

== Legacy ==
The Lebus collision remains a notable event in the history of East German railway safety, influencing the adoption of stricter signal management practices. This event also contributed to broader discussions about international railway safety standards, especially regarding visibility and track management.

On 2 June 1996, Lebus station closed. The branch line has now been largely abandoned, having seen falling usage for years in the period after German reunification. Today there is no sign of the disaster at the site, and no memorial.

== See also ==
- List of German rail accidents
- List of rail accidents (1970–1979)
