= Trebbin rail accident =

1962 disaster in Trebbin, East Germany

- Location within Germany

Details
- Date: 1 March 1962; 64 years ago
- Location: Near Trebbin, Bezirk Potsdam
- Coordinates: 52°10′14.2″N 13°13′17.2″E
- Country: East Germany
- Line: Berlin–Halle
- Operator: Deutsche Reichsbahn (East Germany)
- Incident type: Derailment
- Cause: Unsecured load

Statistics
- Trains: 2
- Deaths: ~70

The Trebbin rail accident near Trebbin in East Germany caused at least 70 deaths. It occurred on 1 March 1962 near Kliestow, today an Ortsteil of Trebbin, on the Berlin–Halle railway in what was then East Germany, when the gun barrel on the unsecured turret of a Soviet tank on a military train struck an express passenger train, leading to the military train derailing.

No official death toll was ever given, the East German press only reporting the death of a single passenger on the express train, however it has been estimated that between 70 and up to 100 people were killed, the majority of whom were soldiers being transported on the military train. It is one of the worst rail disasters to occur in Brandenburg.

== Accident ==
On 1 March 1962 a military train transporting a Soviet tank battalion from the Jüterbog training area destined for East Berlin consisting of 15 flatcars, each carrying two T-55 tanks, and at least 7 wooden-bodied boxcars with between 30 and 50 soldiers inside each was heading along the Berlin–Halle railway. The orientation in which the gun barrels of the tanks faced is debated, but at least one per flatcar was pointed in the same direction as the military train was moving. In the opposite direction a Städteschnellverkehr express train was incoming on the neighbouring track, bound for Leipzig, and traveling at 120 km/h.

The turret lock on one of the T-55 tanks came loose, first hitting the steam locomotive hauling the express train at 7 pm at the level crossing on the F 101 highway (now the B 101) near Kliestow, knocking off the water pump. The water pump rebounded off the track and smashed through the window of one of the passenger carriages, causing a passenger, a 38-year old man, Siegfried Morgenstern of Leipzig, to be thrown from the train, killing him. This was the only known civilian death, mainly due to the carriages being of a corridor type, with the corridor sides facing the military train. The tank was thrown off its flatcar after colliding with the passenger carriages, derailing the military train, causing the wagons to pile up, with fire services having to erect a ladder up to 15 meters in-length, this still wasn't high enough, eyewitness reports stating the splintering wood of the wooden-bodied boxcars seriously injured the soldiers within.

== Aftermath ==
Morgenstern, the passenger who was fatally struck by the water pump while in the corridor of one of the express trains' carriages was the only fatality reported by the East German media, being mentioned 2-days after the fact in the Märkischen Volksstimme newspaper. Neither East German or Soviet authorities gave any indication as to how many of the Soviet military personnel were injured or even killed. Eyewitness accounts from the rescue services deployed at the scene of the accident estimated between 70 and 90 soldiers were instantly killed. It is not known how many of the soldiers died of their injuries in hospital.

The rail accident at Trebbin was re-enacted in an episode of the RBB Fernsehen television series, Theodor - Das Magazin aus Brandenburg, written by Bernd Herrmann, airing on 9 March 2012 to coincide with the accident's 50th anniversary. The episode was partially inspired by the discovery of 15 gravestones from the date of the accident belonging to Soviet soldiers in the Michendorfer Chaussee cemetery in Potsdam, discovered while being restored by Beelitzer Steinmetz GmbH a few years prior.

Episode 88 of the MDR television series, Lebensretter focused on the Trebbin rail accident, airing on 9 June 2016.
