= Hordorf train collision =

2011 railway incident in Germany

2011 Saxony-Anhalt train collision
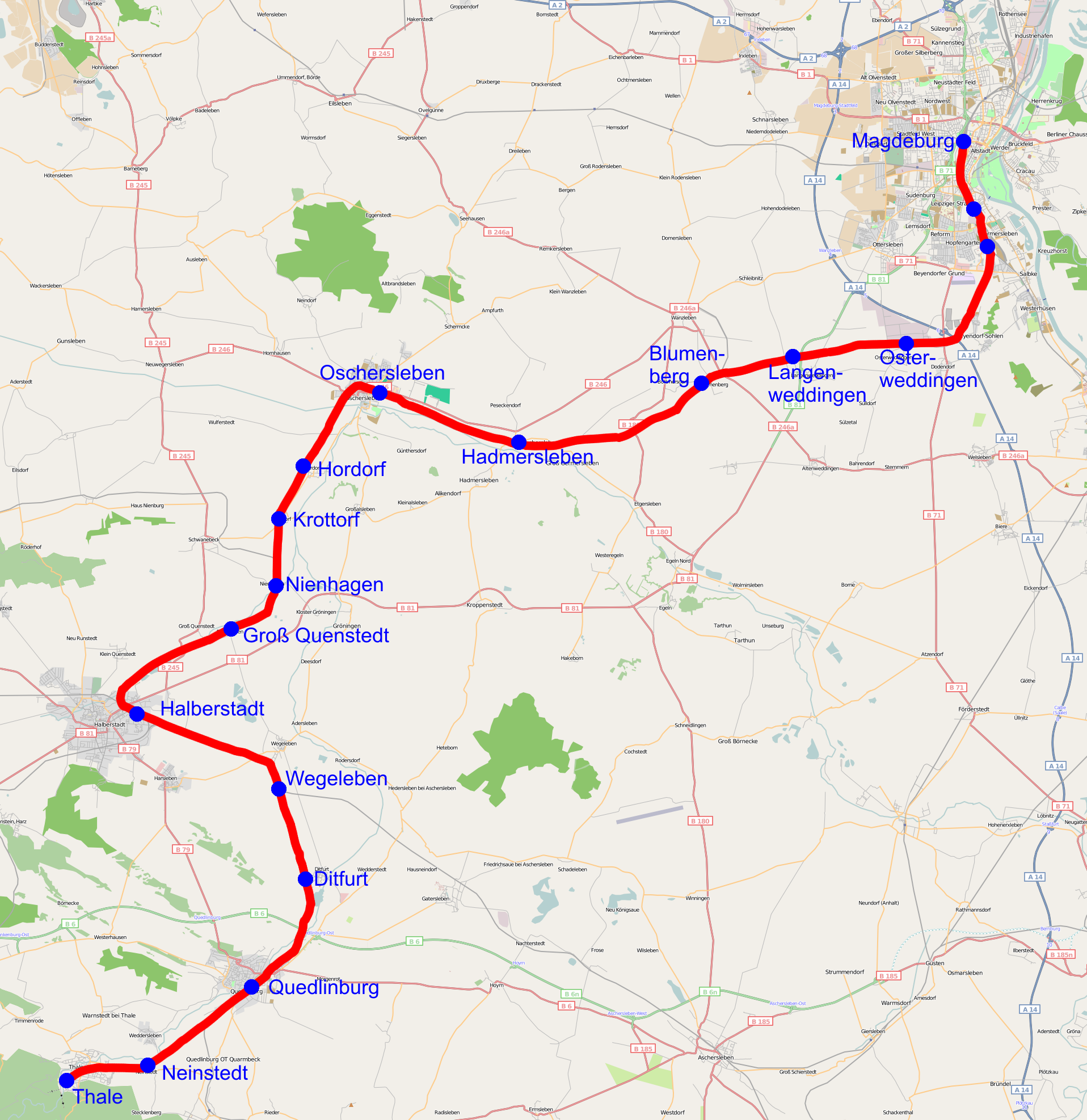
- Track map of the railway

Details
- Date: 29 January 2011; ~ 22:25
- Location: Hordorf, Saxony-Anhalt
- Coordinates: 52°00′02″N 11°11′30″E
- Country: Germany
- Line: Magdeburg–Thale railway
- Operator: Veolia Verkehr Sachsen-Anhalt GmbH / Verkehrsbetriebe Peine-Salzgitter
- Incident type: Collision

Statistics
- Trains: 2
- Deaths: 10
- Injured: 23
Route map

On 29 January 2011, a freight train and a passenger train collided near Hordorf in Saxony-Anhalt, Germany on the Magdeburg–Thale line. The passenger train derailed in the collision. Ten people were killed and 43 people were injured, some of them critically.

Initial reports of 33 injured persons were later corrected to 23, some of them critical. Around 100 rescue workers were at the collision site, which is about 200 kilometres (120 mi) west of Berlin.

== Collision ==
The local passenger train with about 45 to 50 passengers on board was approaching the end of a single-track section at approximately 100 km/h (62 mph), where it collided head-on in very foggy conditions with the freight train, which was travelling at about 80 km/h (50 mph). Both trains had reduced their speeds prior to impact – while the freight train slowed only marginally to 68 km/h (42 mph), an emergency brake application on the passenger train had slowed it down from 98 to 66 km/h (61 to 41 mph). The impact derailed the passenger train, which fell on its side next to the track. The front part of the passenger train was crushed. The freight train ran on for another 500 metres (1,600 ft) before coming to a halt.

Subsequent investigations showed that the freight train had most likely passed a signal at danger, as well as the preceding distant signal giving advance warning of the stop signal ahead. The line had been on the list for installation of the PZB automatic train protection system for years, but at the time of the crash this had not been carried out and there were only visual signals. When the freight train ran through the points, which were already set for the passenger train, the signalman in the signal box at Hordorf was alerted. He testified that he immediately radioed an instruction to stop via Zugbahnfunk but got no response until after the collision, which occurred just seconds later.

Since many people were severely injured, it was considered likely that the death toll could rise in the immediate aftermath of the incident. The nine killed passengers had lived in the Harz region; the driver of the passenger train, who was also killed, came from Mecklenburg.

=== Trains involved ===
The passenger train involved in the incident was a lightweight Baureihe 648 operated by Harz Elbe Express, which was traveling from Magdeburg to Halberstadt. It had a tare weight of 63.5 t.

The freight train was operated by the Peine-Salzgitter company and carried calcium carbonate. It had a gross weight of about 2700 t pulled by two Vossloh G1700 BB locomotives.

== Aftermath ==
About 100 police and specialized rescue workers were involved in the rescue efforts. Ambulances were used to transport the wounded, as heavy fog meant helicopters were unable to fly.

Two days after the incident, it was announced that the driver of the freight train was under investigation for "alleged involuntary manslaughter" and was under suspicion of failing to stop for a red signal prior to the crash. On 1 February, it was reported that investigators believed that the freight train had passed signals showing both caution and stop prior to the crash. Investigators hoped to question the driver of the freight train, who was in a state of shock at the time, later that week.

In response to the crash, the national rail operator Deutsche Bahn said that it would improve safety systems on all single-track lines in the country, including installing automatic train stop systems as required. The installation of PZB at Hordorf had already been planned for March 2011 (in order to increase the line speed limit to 120 km/h (75 mph)) and this work was finally done at the end of May 2011.

The final investigation report was published on 14 September 2011. It discounted any equipment failure, concluding human error to be the root cause. The actual severity of the fog at the time and location of the crash remains uncertain due to the rapid changes of these weather phenomena, but the driver of the preceding train reported a visibility range of 100 to 150 m. Rumours of the freight train driver being on the second locomotive were rejected in the report as unfounded.

Criminal charges were brought against the freight train driver on 3 January 2012 and the trial began on 8 October 2012 in Magdeburg with accusations of killing ten persons ("fahrlässige Tötung" criminally negligent manslaughter), injuring 22 persons ("fahrlässige Körperverletzung" criminal battery through culpable negligence) and the railway damage ("Gefährdung des Bahnverkehrs" reckless endangerment of rail traffic). On 28 November 2012 the freight train driver, 41-year-old Titus S., was convicted and sentenced to one year on probation at the suggestion of both state attorney and defense. The defense stated, however, that Deutsche Bahn should bear the main share of the blame for ignoring known safety issues on the line (a near collision of two passenger trains had occurred a few kilometers away in 2006 leading to a plan for an immediate installation of automatic train stops, but this was delayed until after the Hordorf collision). Two joint plaintiffs criticized the result, filing an appeal, which was rejected by the BGH supreme court on 6 August 2013.

The Sixth Railway Regulations Change Act (Sechste Verordnung zur Änderung eisenbahnrechtlicher Vorschriften) as of 25 July 2012 tightens the rules for the EBO railway regulations so that most minor lines, as well as more important ones, need to be equipped with automatic train stops by 1 December 2014. (requirement is on all lines with a line speed over 80 km/h, on all lines where multiple trains may run at more than 50 km/h, and on all passenger lines where multiple trains may run, at any speed)
