= Markdorf rail disaster =

1939 disaster in Markdorf, Nazi Germany

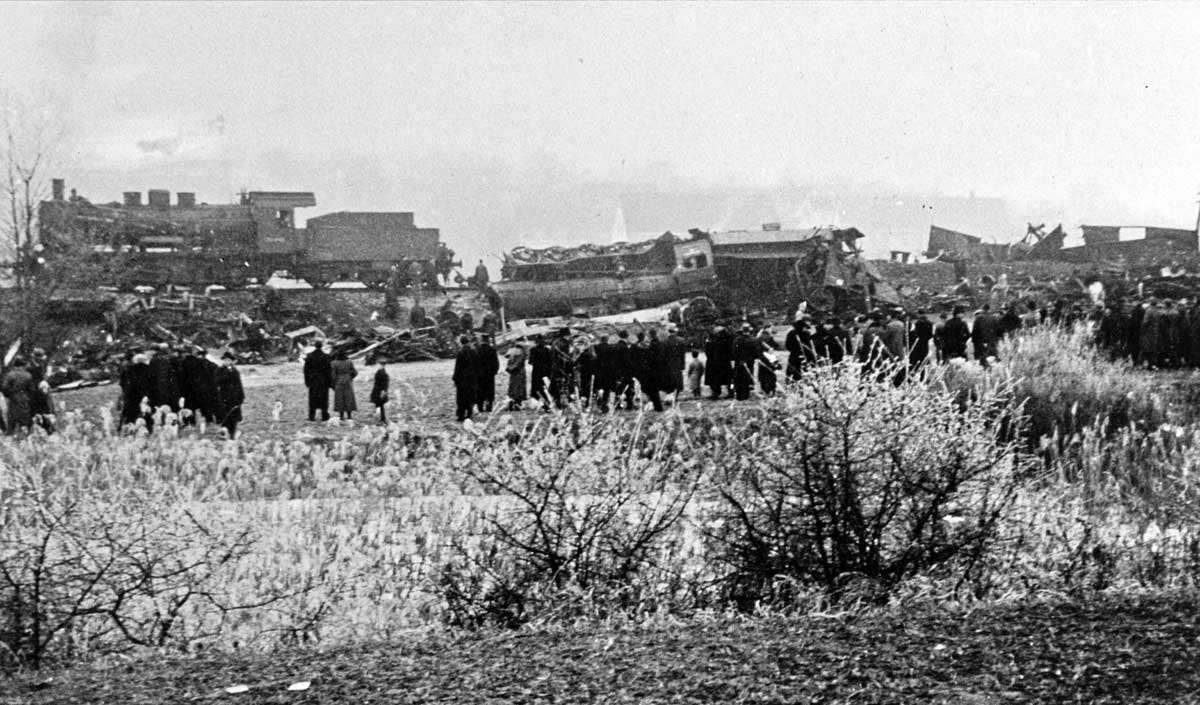
- Incident site during recovery process.

- Location within Germany

Details
- Date: 22 December 1939; 86 years ago
- Location: Near Markdorf
- Coordinates: 47°41′59.4″N 9°24′11.1″E
- Country: Nazi Germany
- Line: Stahringen–Friedrichshafen
- Operator: Deutsche Reichsbahn
- Incident type: Head-on collision
- Cause: Various operational mistakes; Bad weather; Wartime precautions

Statistics
- Trains: 2
- Deaths: 101
- Injured: 47

The Markdorf rail disaster near Markdorf in Nazi Germany resulted in 101 deaths and 47 injured persons. It occurred on 22 December 1939 near Lipbach, today part of Friedrichshafen on the Stahringen–Friedrichshafen line, part of the Lake Constance Belt Railway when two trains collided head-on with each other.

== Background ==
The Stahringen–Friedrichshafen line is single-track and runs along the northern shore of Lake Constance. The Second World War had caused staff shortages along the line, and the signal box at Markdorf station was staffed by one employee who also had to ride a bicycle to a level crossing 500 metres away to lower the barriers whenever a train passed. This operation was conducted under blackout conditions.

Special trains which would be passing through Markdorf station had to be entered into a logbook, with all entries for the day having to be displayed on the stations' noticeboard by the officer on duty at midnight. This was made more difficult due to blackout conditions so the entire station, including the platform was unlit.

The westward bound passenger train, hauled by a DRG 57 class (Prussian G10 class) steam locomotive, was a special train from Oberstdorf heading towards Müllheim (designated P Kar 21154), which was now a request service which rarely operated, but was left on the timetable. Due to a carriage shortage the train had been running late, this had been communicated to the stations along the line. The train was traveling at its maximum speed of 60 km/h and consisted of 11 carriages and 4 baggage wagons, with 700 passengers on board, including residents returning to Weil am Rhein after it had been evacuated due to the Second World War.

The eastward bound goods train, designated Dg 7953, and also hauled by a 57 class locomotive, was a regular daily service hauling coal to Lindau. The guard who usually rode in the brake van at the end of the train, and who was responsible for a signal light being displayed to mark the end of the train was instead riding in a baggage wagon directly behind the locomotive with permission from the conductor due to the cold. Regulations stipulated that the goods train was required to stop at Markdorf station, even if the signal indicated the line ahead was clear.

Blackout conditions also meant both trains were sparsely lit, only being illuminated by narrow slits on the headlamps, substantially reducing their brightness. This was worsened by the thick fog which had descended on the evening of the accident.

== Accident ==
The deputy station master at Markdorf received notice that the passenger train would be running the following day via telegram at 8 pm on 21 December 1939, but he failed to record it in the logbook. The station master returned for the day shift on 22 December, before he was relieved from duty by his deputy again at 7 pm. The station master failed to notice his deputy's error, and when the deputy returned for the night shift he had forgotten about the passenger train, therefor no other employees were aware of it. The goods train was given permission to proceed towards Kluftern at 10:06 pm, but the deputy failed to ask Kluftern whether they could accept the goods train. The deputy was additionally distracted by paperwork and suffered a blackout, and no block system was in place.

The passenger train was given permission to proceed to Kluftern from Fischbach station at 10:12 pm. The dispatcher at Kluftern attempted to communicate with his counterpart at Markdorf at 10:14 pm to see whether the passenger train could proceed onwards but received no answer. The dispatcher instead relied on the timetable as provided to him, and gave the passenger train permission to proceed to Markdorf before he again tried calling Markdorf. At the same time the deputy at Markdorf tried calling Kluftern, resulting in no connection on either end, the dispatcher sent a ringing bell signal to Markdorf, signalling that a train was approaching.

The ringing bell caused the deputy to remember the passenger train, the deputy ran onto the platform to stop the goods train, but the locomotive had already passed the station building. The deputy had no means to get attention, lacking any lighting or even his whistle. According to regulations the goods train was supposed to stop regardless if the line ahead was signalled as clear; it did not, and none of the crew on the goods train noticed the deputy. The deputy then attempted to contact the signal box to set the top signal to stop the goods train, this failed as the signalman was at the level crossing 500 metres away awaiting the passing of the goods train.

The deputy then tried contacting Kluftern, and the connection was made immediately, but the passenger train had already passed the station. The two trains were now on a collision course on the same 2.5 kilometre stretch of track, neither train noticing each other until it was too late due to thick heavy fog, and the restricted lighting of their headlamps as per blackout conditions. The passenger train triggered its emergency brakes at the last moment, the goods train did not brake at all, and at 10:19 pm the two trains collided with each other, both at a speed of 60 km/h. Neither locomotive overturned, but the first two carriages were completely destroyed, while two following were badly damaged, the baggage wagon plus 15 open wagons on the goods train piled up in a heap.

== Aftermath ==
101 people died as a result of the accident and 47 people were injured. 98 of the victims came from the Markgräflerland region, the other 3 victims were part of the locomotive crews. On Christmas Day in 1939 the coffins of the victims were laid out in the town square of Markdorf, with multiple dignitaries visiting to pay their respects, such as Reichsstatthalter Robert Wagner.

The Regional Court of Konstanz sentenced the dispatcher from Kluftern to a twelve-month prison term, while the deputy station master from Markdorf was convicted as the main culprit, receiving a three-year prison sentence.

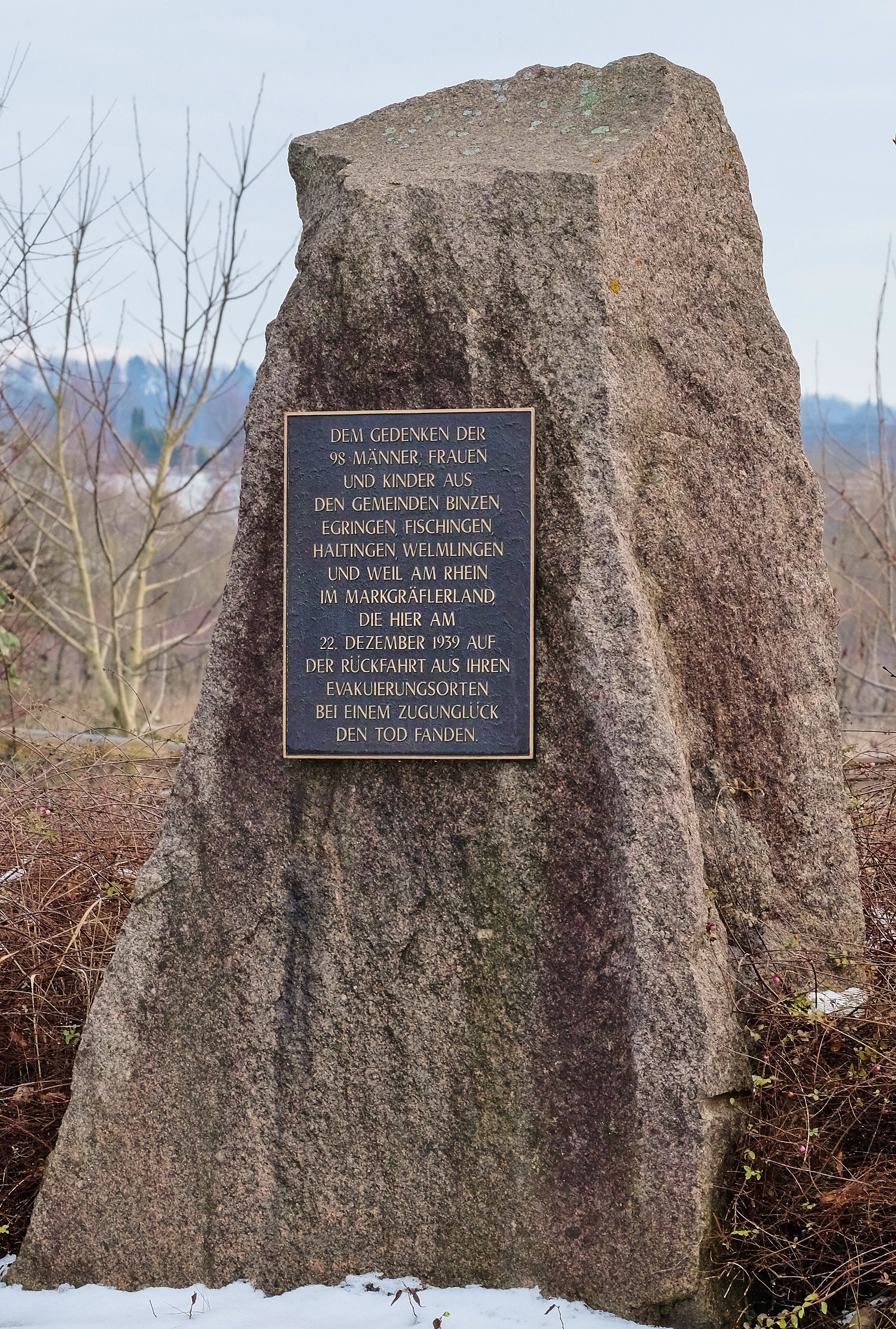
The memorial near Lipbach, January 2016.

Several memorials have been erected to commemorate the deaths of those who died in the accident, such as one at Lipbach unveiled on 22 December 1989.

== Also that day ==
On the same day, 22 December 1939, the Genthin rail disaster occurred, in which an express train collided with a goods train, killing at least 186 people and injuring numerous others. Railway historian Albert Kuntzemüller described the day as 'the darkest in German rail history'.
