= Genthin rail disaster =

Deadliest German train crash (1939)

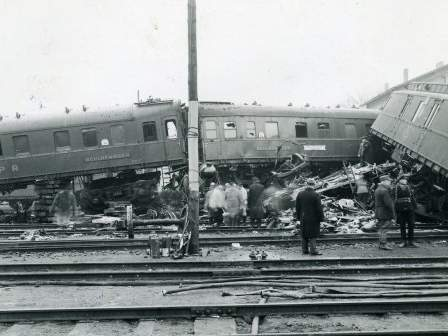
- Crash scene

- Location within Germany

Details
- Date: 22 December 1939; 00:55 CET
- Location: Genthin, Landkreis Jerichow II, Regierungsbezirk Magdeburg, Province of Saxony, Free State of Prussia, Nazi Germany
- Coordinates: 52°24′11.63″N 12°9′23.48″E
- Country: Nazi Germany
- Line: Berlin–Magdeburg railway
- Operator: Deutsche Reichsbahn
- Incident type: Rear-end collision
- Cause: Signal passed at danger and signaller’s error

Statistics
- Trains: 2
- Deaths: ~186−278
- Injured: ~106−453

The Genthin rail disaster occurred on 22 December 1939, when an express train crashed into a stationary express train in Genthin station, in today's Saxony-Anhalt state of Germany. There were up to 278 deaths, making it the worst passenger train accident in German history. It was caused by a misreading of signals, owing to one train not being equipped with automated protection, due to wartime shortages.

== Background ==
The Berlin–Magdeburg railway was equipped with Indusi train protection system at the time.

Christmas Day 1939 fell on a Monday, which many families and soldiers used as a long weekend. Because of the Second World War, spare locomotives or coaches for relief trains were not available, so the existing trains were overcrowded. Express train D 10 (23:15 from Berlin Potsdamer Bahnhof to Cologne) had left Berlin on time, but due to excessive dwelling time and the blackout (most lights at stations were turned off) it was quickly delayed up to 30 minutes.

The following D 180 was scheduled to run from Berlin Potsdamer Bahnhof (departure 23:45) to Neunkirchen (Saar). It was pulled by a DRG Class 01 steam locomotive (no. 01 158), whose Indusi equipment was taken out for repairs. Due to the ongoing locomotive shortage it was put into service nevertheless.

D 180 had fewer stops than the preceding express, so it quickly caught up with D 10 and was running one block behind it.

== Accident ==
One station before Genthin, the D 180 passed Belicke block post signal at danger. The locomotive was not equipped with the Indusi system, which would have stopped the train. The driver later stated that all signals were showing a "green" aspect, which was denied by the signalman at Belicke. Speculation regarding the misinterpretation of the signals included difficult signal-sighting at night or driver error.

After the train passed the signal at danger, the signalman at Belicke immediately warned the next signal box down the line at Genthin Ost (Genthin East). The signalman there tried to stop the D 180 by waving an emergency red lamp. This was seen by the driver of the preceding D 10, who made an emergency brake application and the train came to a stand at Genthin station at 00:51.

Instead of then putting his signals to danger, the signalman at Genthin East continued to use the red lamp to try to warn the driver of D 180, but he did not notice it, presumably because he 'read through' to the next signal which was displaying the green aspect intended for the D 10.

At 00:55 D 180 crashed into the rear of the stationary D 10 at approximately 100 kilometres per hour (62.1 mph).

== Aftermath ==
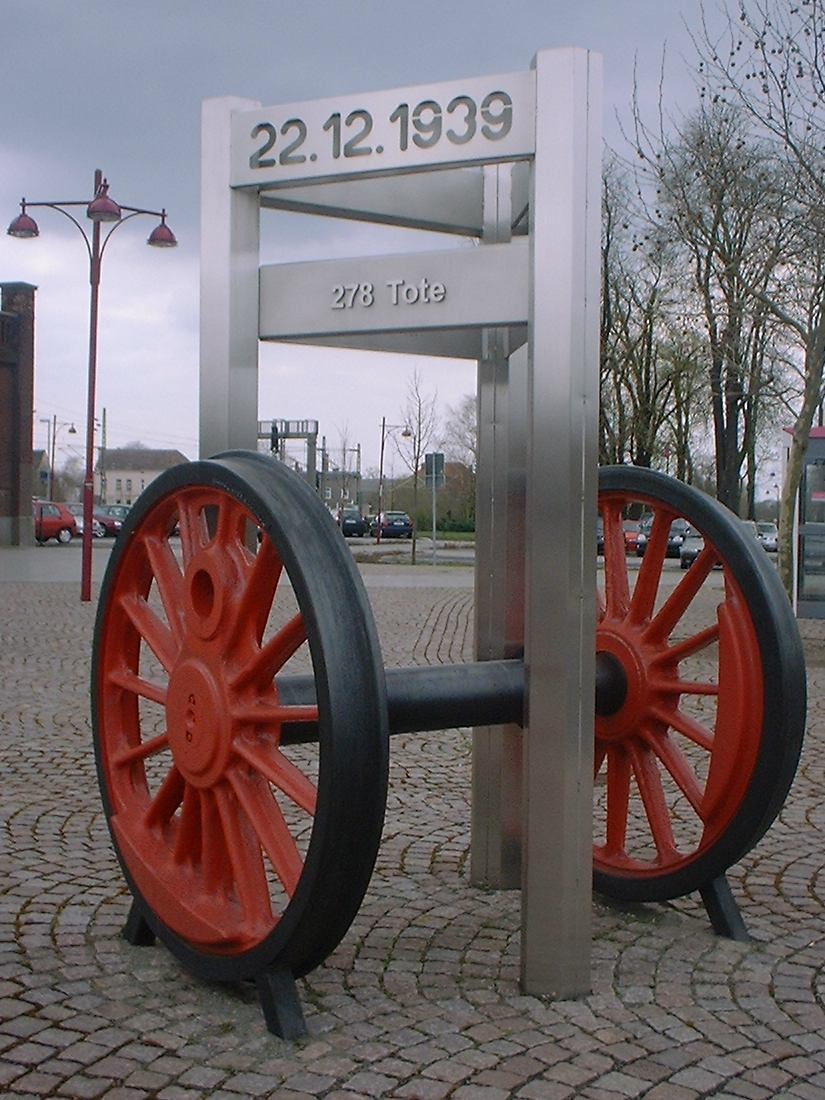
Memorial in the forecourt of Genthin station mentioning 278 deaths

The rear four coaches of the D 10 were partly destroyed and telescoped. The locomotives and six coaches of D 180 derailed. Official figures of Deutsche Reichsbahn report 186 fatalities and 106 injured. Other sources, including the memorial, claim 278 deaths and 453 injuries. Together with the 1948 BASF tank car explosion in Ludwigshafen, where 207 died and around 4,000 were injured, this is the worst railway accident in Germany.

Emergency services on site proved difficult, as lights were not allowed to be used because of the blackout. A special permission was needed to install floodlights. Many firemen were drafted for military services and were unavailable; in addition, temperatures sank to −15 °C (5 °F) in the night and many injured froze to death.

The driver and fireman of D 180 survived. The driver was later sentenced to prison for three years and six months.

Locomotive 01 158, which pulled the D 180, was repaired and rejoined service in 1941. It is preserved today as 01 1531 in Bahnbetriebswerk Arnstadt railway museum in Arnstadt, Thuringia.

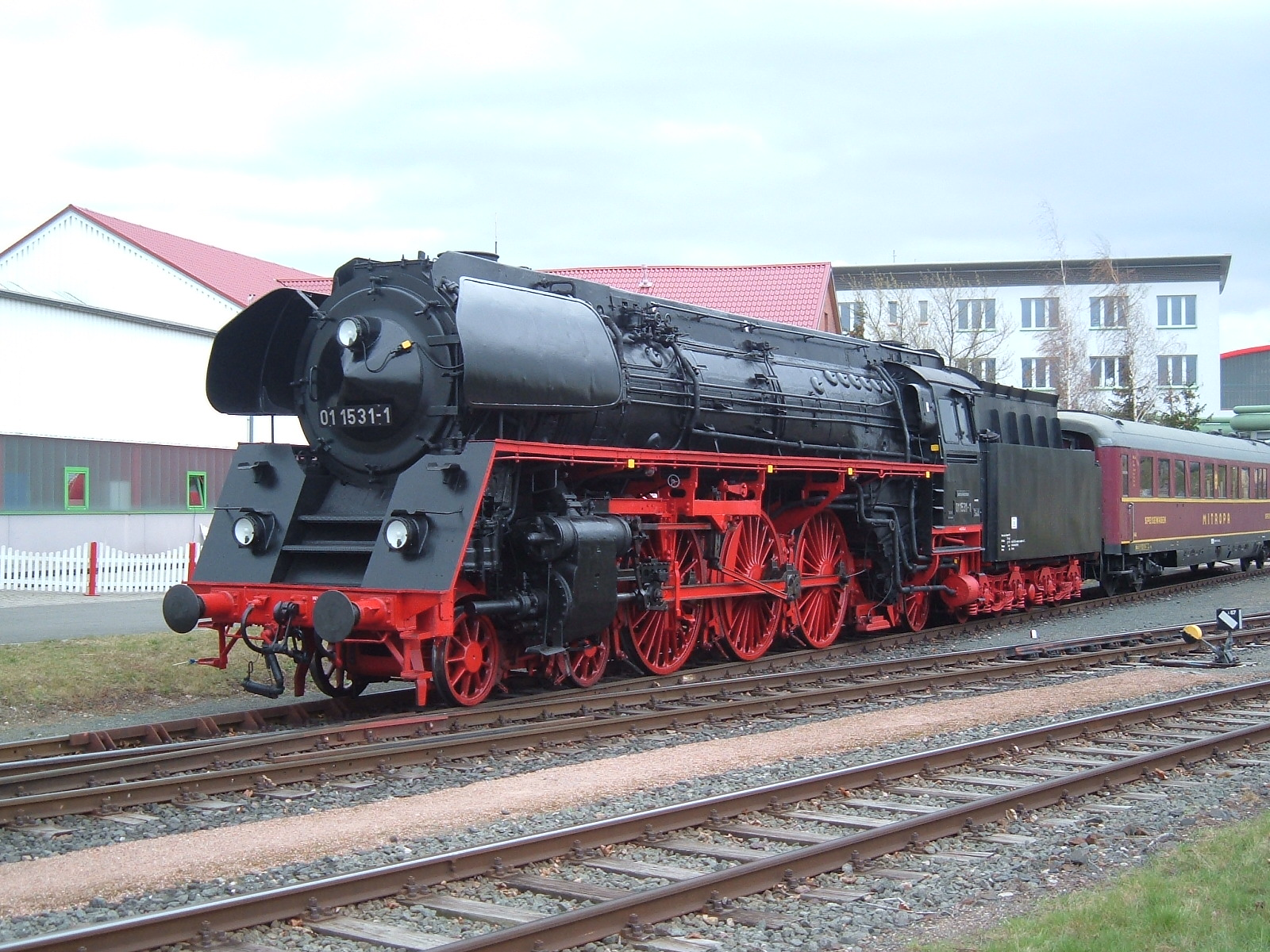
The locomotive which pulled the D 180

== Also that day ==
On the same day, a freight train and an overcrowded passenger train crashed on the Lake Constance Belt Railway in the Markdorf rail disaster. More than 100 died. Railway historian Albert Kuntzemüller described the day as 'the darkest in German rail history'.
