= List of rail accidents (1970–1979) =

This is a list of rail accidents from 1970 to 1979. For a list of terrorist incidents involving trains, see List of terrorist incidents involving railway systems.

== 1970 ==
- February 1 – Argentina – Benavídez rail disaster: A Tucumán–Buenos Aires express train collided with a standing local train south of Benavídez railroad station 29 km (18 mi) north of Buenos Aires. 142 people were killed, 368 injured (though some sources state 236 killed).
- February 16 – Nigeria – A train crowded with Eid al-Kabir pilgrims derailed at Langalanga about 27 km southeast of Gusau, with several cars falling down an embankment. About 150 were killed; reportedly, 52 of the injured were killed in a truck crash on the way to hospital.
- March 22 – United States – Branford, Connecticut: A Penn Central freight train derailed on the Shore Line Division (now the Northeast Corridor) in Branford center. 25 of the 86 cars derailed, demolishing Branford Station (a passenger shed at the time), and tore up a one-half-mile (800 m) of track. The cause of the accident was the breakage of an overheated axle on a car loaded with 83 tons (75 t) of steel, which dragged the derailed cars off with it.
- May 20 – United Kingdom – Audenshaw Junction rail accident: A Class 506 electric multiple unit derailed at Audenshaw Junction, Cheshire due to a set of points moving under it. Two people were killed and 13 were injured. The cause of the accident was irregular practices by a signalman.
- June 21 - United States - A Toledo, Peoria and Western Railway train derailed in downtown Crescent City, Illinois. A propane tank car ruptured and explosions caused fires that destroyed the city center. Over 60 firefighters and civilians were injured.
- July 15 – United Kingdom – A 4BEP electric multiple unit collided with a lorry on a level crossing at Chartham, Kent, killing two people.
- August 9 – Spain – A train from coastal resorts to Bilbao collided with a freight train at Plentzia, killing 33 people and injuring about 200.
- October 31 – India – A Mangalore Mail crashes into a stationary Cochin Mail at the Perambur station, Madras, killing 16 and injuring 108.
- December 6 – United States – 1970 Lehigh Valley Railroad derailment: Twenty-five cars of a Lehigh Valley Railroad freight train derailed in Le Roy, New York. A toxic chemical spill led to the scene becoming a United States Environmental Protection Agency Superfund site in 1999. Over 40 years later, the spill was briefly thought to have caused an illness outbreak in the town.
- December 31 – Iran – Two trains collided at Ardakan due to a signalman's error; a government source indicates 15 people killed, but journalists reported at least 70, with 130 injured.

== 1971 ==
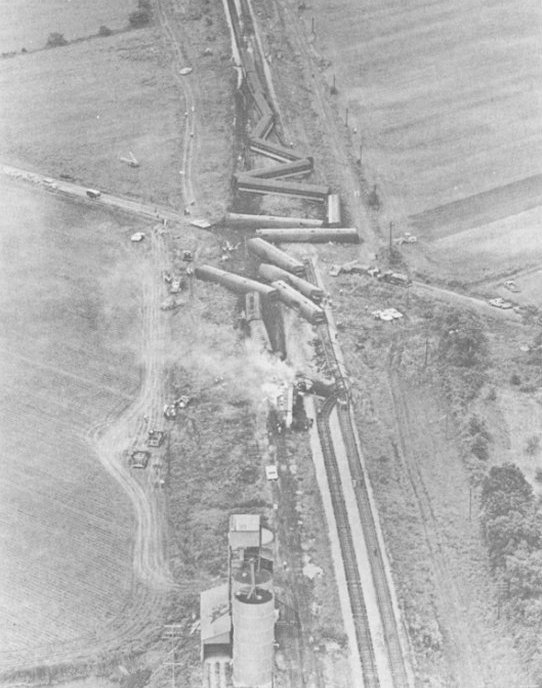
Salem, Illinois

- January 18 – Switzerland – Two commuter trains collided between Feldmeilen and Herrliberg, killing six people and injuring 17.
- February 9 – West Germany – Aitrang: The TEE 56 Bavaria, a SBB RAm TEE DMU, traveling from Munich to Zürich, derailed while passing a curve shortly after Aitrang station. The maximum speed in the curve was 80 km/h, however the train passed the curve at 130 km/h due to frozen water in the air brake. Shortly after the TEE derailed, a railbus hit the wreckage from the opposite direction. 28 people died, 42 were injured.
- February 14 – Yugoslavia – In a tunnel near Vranduk (now in Bosnia and Herzegovina), a fire broke out in the diesel-electric locomotive of a passenger train, which then spread to the other cars, killing at least 34.
- February 26 – United Kingdom – A passenger train made of five 2HAP electric multiple units overran the buffers at Sheerness-on-Sea, Kent and demolished the station building, killing one person and injuring ten.
- March 11 – Chile – Gualliguaica rail accident: A passenger train ran away on a downslope from Vicuña to Cresta de Gualliguaica and plunged into a ravine; killing 12.
- May 4 – United Kingdom – On the Northern Line of the London Underground, a train entered the reversing siding at Tooting Broadway after offloading passengers and crashed into the end of the tunnel at 20–30 mph (32–48 km/h). The driver, who was killed, was apparently reading a book.
- May 27 – West Germany – Dahlerau train disaster: At Radevormwald, a special railbus service carrying schoolchildren and a freight train collided on the Wuppertal–Radevormwald single-track line near Dahlerau station. The local dispatcher claimed to have signalled a red light to the freight train, while the freight train engineer claimed to have seen a green one. Ultimately, the case was not resolved as the dispatcher was killed in a car accident before legal hearings started. 41 people died, 25 were injured in the worst rail accident in West Germany during Deutsche Bundesbahn era. The crash led to the phasing out of the Nachtbefehlsstab ("Nighttime Command Staff"), and presses DB to introduce radio communications on branch lines.
- June 10 – United States – 1971 Salem, Illinois, derailment: Amtrak train number 1, the northbound City of New Orleans derailed at 90 miles per hour (145 km/h) due to a false flange on a flat wheel caused by a seized axle bearing. Eleven people died and over were 150 injured in Amtrak's first major incident.
- July 2 – United Kingdom – At Tattenhall Junction, the track shifted under a passing 10-car special school excursion train from Rhyl to Smethwick due to thermal stress and derailed the last three cars, killing two children and injuring 26 people.
- July 21 – West Germany – Rheinweiler: D 370 from Basel to Copenhagen passed a 75 km/h curve at about 140 km/h and derailed, destroying a detached house, killing 23 people and injuring 121. The suspected reason for the accident was a technical failure in the Class 103 engine's automatic cruise control mechanism, leading to the engine gaining too much speed. The cruise control was consequently disabled and restricted speed zones were equipped with PZB.
- August 4 – Yugoslavia – Interurban train Belgare-Požarevac collided with a freight train between the Kasapovac and Lipe stations near Vrčin. 39 people were killed and 73 injured.
- August 28 – Switzerland – A train derailed in the Simplon Tunnel, killing five people.
- October 6 – United Kingdom – A 24-car freight train ran away on the downgrade from Beattock Summit toward Carlisle due to stopcocks in the air-brake line being closed. It collided with the train ahead, killing one crew member on that train.
- October 19 – United States – 20 cars of Missouri Pacific Railroad train No. 94 derailed in Houston; two tank cars loaded with vinyl chloride monomer were punctured, allowing the gas to escape and ignite; 45 minutes after the derailment a third tank car exploded and a fourth was "rocketed" some 300 feet (91 m) away; a fireman was killed and 50 were injured.
- October 26 – Japan – On the Kinki Nippon Railway, between Osaka and Nagoya, a head-on collision killed 23 people.

== 1972 ==
- January 8 – United Kingdom – An engineers train overran signals and rear-ended an electric multiple unit at Horsham, West Sussex. The train crew had failed to perform a brake check before departing from Three Bridges and failed to discover that the isolation cocks between the two locomotives had not been opened. Fifteen people are injured.
- January 16 – Greece – Orfana rail disaster – A breakdown in communication between the stationmasters at Doxaras and Orfana caused an express train and a military relief train to collide in bad weather on the single track line. The southbound diesel hauled Acropolis Express and northbound Number 121 Athens-Thessaloniki, (known as posta) were allowed to proceed without first allowing a passing loop. 21 people died, and more than 40 were injured in one of the deadliest rail accidents in Greece. Nikolaos Gekas The stationmaster at Orfana was later sentenced to 5 years for his part in the disaster.
- March 24 – United States – Gilchrest Road, New York crossing accident: a school bus was struck by a freight train at a level crossing in Rockland County, New York, near the New York City suburbs of Congers and Valley Cottage, killing five students. The bus driver was convicted of negligent homicide and sentenced to probation; the accident also led the U.S. to require school buses to stop at all grade crossings they encounter.
- March 31 – South Africa – A derailment on the approach to a bridge at Potgietersrus (now Mokopane), possibly due to sabotage, killed 38 people and injures 174.
- April 26 – India – A derailment north of Bangalore killed 21 and injured 37.
- May 8 - United Kingdom - Chester General rail crash: A freight train collided with empty coaching stock stopped at Chester, as a result of a brake failure. The resulting fire caused significant damage to the station.
- June 3 – Poland – Ślesin, (near Bydgoszcz): A train Kolobrzeg–Warsaw derailed on fatigue rail , killing 12 people and injuring 26.
- June 4 – Bangladesh – A crowded passenger train from Khulna crashed into a stationary freight train at Jessore after the stationmaster threw the wrong switch, killing 76 people and injuring about 500.
- June 6 - Indonesia - In West Java, a train carrying pine wood rolled over near Cukanghaur train station, killing a crew member of the train and the station master, and injuring seven people.
- June 11 – United Kingdom – Eltham Well Hall rail crash: An excursion train took a bend at excessive speed and derailed at Eltham, London. The driver and five passengers were killed, and 126 people injured. The subsequent investigation established that the driver had been drinking.
- June 17 – France – Vierzy tunnel disaster: After 110 years in service, the roof of a tunnel at Vierzy collapsed without warning. Passenger trains in both directions between Paris and Laon, both moving about 70 mph (110 km/h), crashed into the rubble and each other. 108 were killed and 240 injured.
- July 21 – Spain – A Madrid-to-Cádiz train collided near Jerez with a local train that failed to obey signals, killing 76 and injuring 103.
- August 8 – Pakistan – At Liaqatpur on the line between Lahore and Karachi, an express was misrouted onto a side track where a freight train was standing; there were between 38 and 65 deaths.
- September 29 – South Africa – All but the first-class cars of a 9-car passenger train from Cape Town to Bitterfontein derailed near Malmesbury due to excess speed; between 48 and about 100 people were killed.
- October 4 – Mexico – 1972 Saltillo train derailment. At Saltillo, a train carrying people from a festival at Real de Catorce, San Luis Potosí, entered a downhill curve at about 75 mph (120 km/h) or twice the speed limit and derailed nine cars, killing 208 people and injuring 700. The engineer was found to have been drinking and was nearly lynched.
- October 12 – United Kingdom – A freight train rear-ended an electric multiple unit at Wimbledon, London due to an error by the freight driver, injuring twelve people.
- October 30 – United States – Chicago commuter rail crash, Two Illinois Central Railroad commuter trains collided after one train, having overshot a station stop, backs into the station, killing 45 people and injuring over 300.
- October 30 – East Germany – Schweinsburg-Culten: The driver of Ext 346 (Leipzig–Karlovy Vary) failed to notice a stop signal on a single-track stretch of line because of dense fog and collided with D 273 heading toward Berlin, killing 22 people and injuring 70.
- October 31 – Turkey – A passenger train and a train carrying oil collided at Eskişehir, starting a fire and causing several cars to go down a cliff; at least 30 were killed, and about 50 injured.
- November 6 – Japan – A fire broke out in the dining car of the Japanese National Railways' Kitaguni night train from Osaka to Aomori, at 13.87 km (8.62 mi) Hokoriku Tunnel (between Tsuruga and Imajō on the Hokuriku Main Line). One crew member and 29 passengers were killed by carbon monoxide and 714 people were injured.
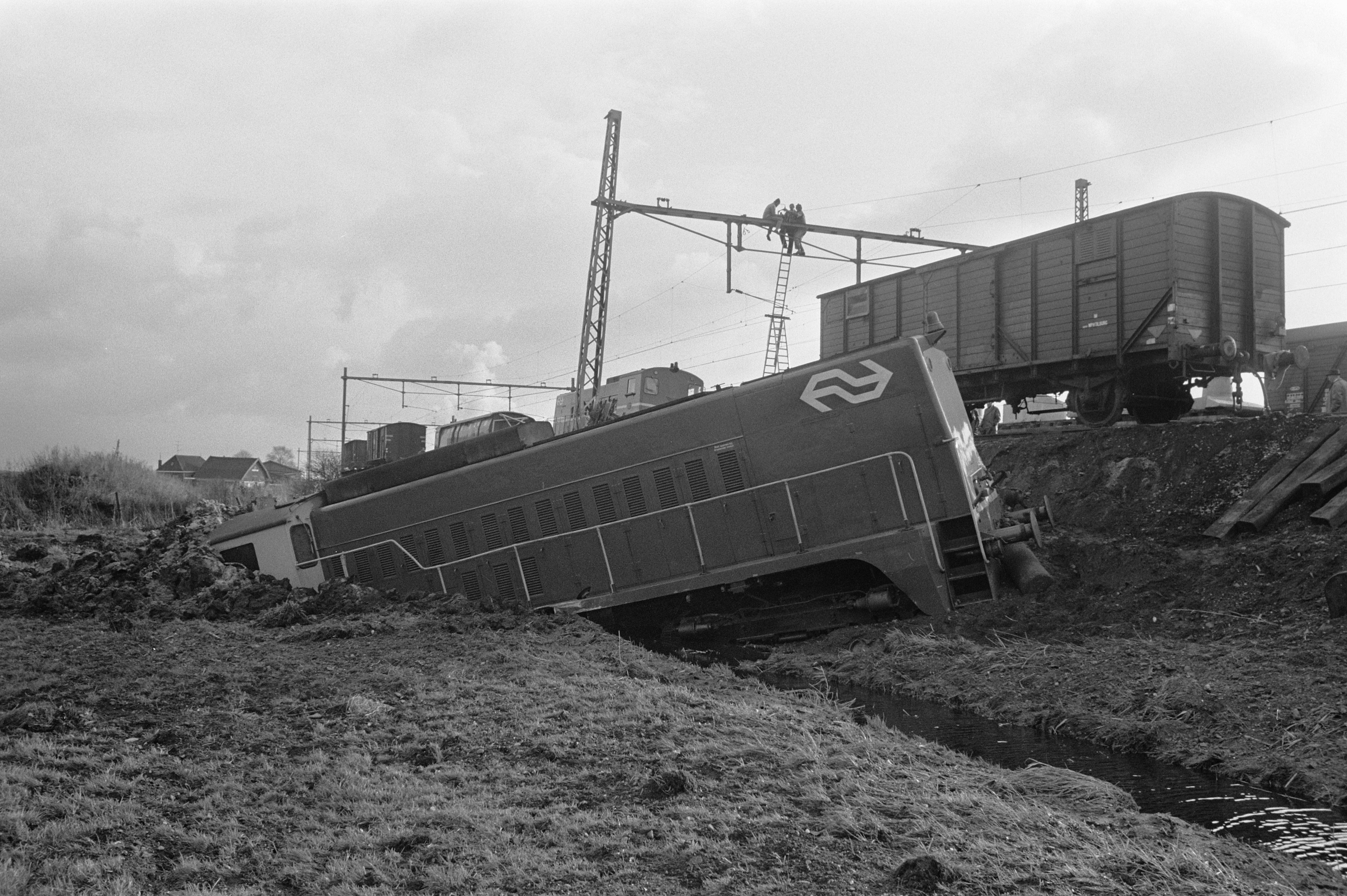
- Halfweg
  November 22 – Netherlands – Railway accident near Halfweg (1972) – the locomotive of a work train derailed in North Holland.
- December 16 – United Kingdom – two electric multiple unit passenger trains collided at Copyhold Junction, West Sussex after a driver misread signals, injuring 25 people.

== 1973 ==
- January 30 – Hungary – Kecskemét level crossing disaster: A bus disregarded crossing signals and booms and was crushed by a train, killing 37 people and injuring 18.
- February 1 – Algeria – A derailment killed 35 people and injured 51.
- February 6 – United States – Littlefield, Texas: A Santa Fe freight train crashed into a schoolbus, killing 7 children and injuring 16.
- March 9 – United States – White Haven, Pennsylvania: A runaway train crashed into the Lehigh Valley Railroad Engine House, damaging the southeast corner of the building
- March 18 – United States – East Palestine, Ohio: Amtrak's westbound Broadway Limited derailed in a heavy snowstorm, killing one Penn Central employee riding on a pass, and injuring 19 passengers.
- May 10 - Canada - Stettler, Alberta. A Canadian National Railways 'Dayliner" struck a vehicle on the regular Edmonton-to-Drumheller line at an uncontrolled crossing, 19 km (12 mi) south and one-mile (1,600 m) west of Stettler. All six teenagers in the car were killed.
- July 10 – East Germany – Leipzig: The driver of a commuter train failed to notice a diversion, causing the train to derail and hit the signal box of Leipzig-Leutzsch railway station. Four people are killed, 25 injured.
- August 27 – Poland – Radkowice, (near Kielce): A Zakopane–Warsaw passenger train slammed into 20 cars which break away from a freight train , killing 16 people and injuring 24.
- October 10 – United States – Bronx, New York: A commuter train from Brewster derailed on Penn Central's Harlem Division at 155th Street in the Mott Haven Yard. It crashed into a signal gantry bringing it down on top of the train. There were two minor injuries.
- December 17 – Brazil – An express passenger train collided head-on with a freight train on the outskirts of Salvador, Bahia, killing 18 people and injuring 40.
- December 19 – United Kingdom – Ealing rail crash: An express passenger train derailed at Ealing Broadway station after a loose battery-box door on the locomotive hauling it struck point rodding, causing a set of points to move under the locomotive. Ten people were killed and 94 were injured.

== 1974 ==
- February 12 – United States – A Delaware and Hudson freight train derailed four miles (6.4 km) north of Oneonta, New York. 54 people (most of them firefighters) were injured after a propane car that had been punctured and two other propane tanker cars exploded. Several nearby homes were also damaged in the blast.
- March 26 – Switzerland – A train derailed at Moutier, killing three people and injuring 13.
- March 27 – Portuguese Mozambique – Magude train disaster: A passenger train collided with a freight train carrying petroleum products. 70 people were killed and 200 injured after the petroleum exploded, melting several passenger coaches.
- July 19 – United States – Decatur, Illinois – A tanker car containing isobutane collided with a Norfolk & Western boxcar causing an explosion that killed seven people, injured 349, and caused $18 million in property damage.
- August 12 – United States – Wake Forest, North Carolina: The Amtrak Silver Star derailed while navigating a curve, injuring 28.
- August 13 – Ireland – Rosslare: Two passenger trains collided head-on at Rosslare Strand, injuring 15 people.
- August 30 – Yugoslavia – Zagreb train disaster: An express train from Athens to Dortmund derailed at Zagreb railway station due to excessive speed, killing 152 passengers and injuring 90.
- October 31 – India – On an express train from Delhi to Calcutta, a fire started after a passenger's fireworks exploded at Mohanganj. Between 43 and 52 people were killed and about 60 injured.
- September 21 – United States – Houston, Texas – At Southern Pacific's Englewood Yard hump, two "jumbo" tank cars collided with an empty tank car which caused it to ride over the coupler of a loaded tank car and puncture the tank head. Butadiene spilled from the car and formed a vapor cloud, which dispersed over the area. After 2–3 minutes, the vapor exploded, killing one person and injuring 235.
- October 21 – Ireland – Gormanston, County Meath. A passenger train ran away driverless and collided with another passenger train at Gormanston, a third passenger train was struck by the two wrecked trains. Two people were killed and 29 were injured.

== 1975 ==
- February 22 – Norway – Tretten train disaster: A passenger train from Oslo collided head-on with an express train from Trondheim, killing 27 people.
- February 28 – United Kingdom – Moorgate tube crash: A driver fails to stop a London Underground train at Moorgate station and continued into the dead-end tunnel beyond, killing 43 people.
- April 4 – Soviet Union – Žasliai railway disaster: passenger train hits a tank car carrying fuel, derailed, and caught fire, killing 20 people and injuring 80. It remains the worst rail disaster in Lithuania.
- May 22 – Morocco – A derailment near Kenitra killed at least 34 people.
- Clearing the wreckage at Nuneaton
  June 6 – United Kingdom – Nuneaton rail crash: The driver of a London Euston-to-Glasgow train missed a temporary speed restriction at Nuneaton because the propane-burning lamps on the marker sign had run out of fuel. The train derailed, killing six people and injuring 38.
- June 8 – West Germany – Two passenger trains collided head-on between Lenggries and Warngau due to errors by dispatchers at both stations. 41 people were killed (38 passengers, 2 drivers, 1 conductor) and 122 were injured.
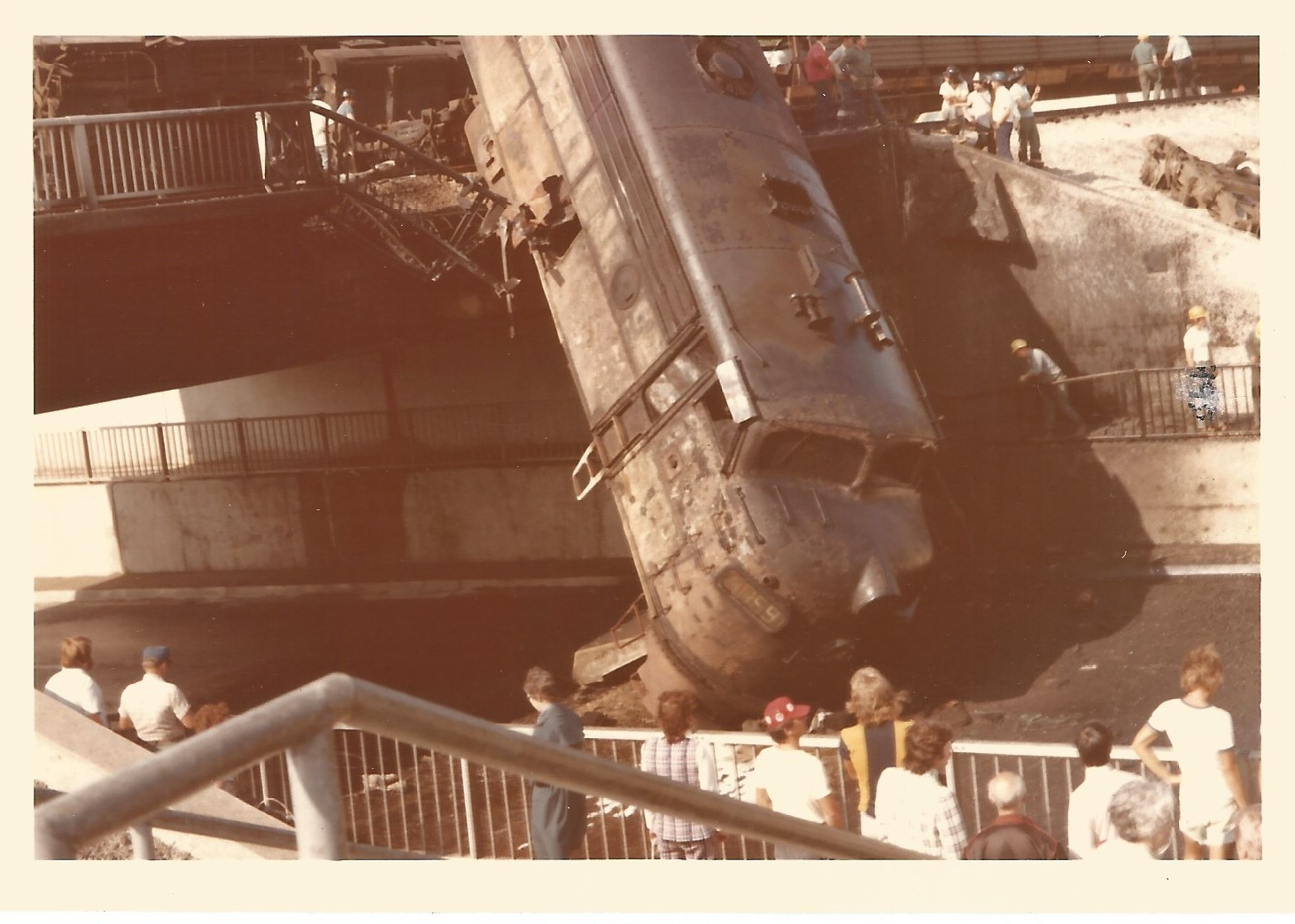
- Derailment in Simcoe, Ontario, June 12, 1975
  June 12 – Canada – At Simcoe, Ontario, a freight train loaded with newly built cars passing through town derailed at a bridge over a road. The locomotive plunged onto the pavement and burst into flames. Two men in the cab died, a third was seriously injured, and blockage of the road effectively split the town in half.
- July 22 – West Germany – A regional train passed a signal at danger and crashed head-on into a freight train which was crossing the tracks in Hamburg-Hausbruch, killing 11 passengers and seriously injuring 65. Investigations revealed that the distance between the signal and place of danger was so short that automated braking would not have prevented the crash.
- September 11 – United Kingdom – A diesel-electric multiple unit collided with an electric multiple unit at Bricklayers Arms Junction, London. One of the trains had passed a signal a danger, but which appeared to the driver to be showing a proceed aspect due to the reflection of sunlight from his cab. 62 people were injured.
- September 29 – Argentina – Two passenger trains collided in Río Luján, killing 32 and injuring 100.
- October 20 – Mexico – A Mexico City Metro train crashed into another at Metro Viaducto station. Between 31 and 39 people were killed, and between 71 and 119 were injured. It is considered the worst accident recorded on the system.
- October 26 – United Kingdom – A passenger train came to a standstill at Lunan, Angus due to the failure of the locomotive hauling it. Assistance is sent for, but an incorrect location was given, causing the rescue locomotive to rear-end the train at 25 miles per hour (40 km/h). One person was killed and 42 were injured.
- December 12 – Canada – A Toronto Transit Commission bus, whose rear doors worked erratically due to a missing wire-retaining screw, was immobilized by its own safety features after the doors opened on a level crossing on St. Clair Avenue near Scarborough GO Station. Before all the passengers can be evacuated, a GO Train running express from Pickering to Toronto smashed into it, killing nine bus passengers and injuring about 20.
- December 31 – Ireland – Near Gorey, County Wexford, a passenger train derailed on a bridge damaged by a vehicle crashing into it, killing five people and injuring 43.

== 1976 ==
- January 3 – United Kingdom – A light engine rear-ended a parcels train at Worcester Tunnel Junction, Worcestershire, killing both crew.
- February – Switzerland – A head-on collision on the Yverdon–Ste-Croix line killed seven and injured 40.
- February 7 – United States – 1976 Beckemeyer train accident: A Baltimore & Ohio freight train struck an overloaded pickup truck at an unprotected grade crossing in Beckemeyer, Illinois, killing 12 people, mostly children, and injuring three others.
- May 4 – Netherlands - Schiedam train disaster: An international train collided with a local train, killing 24 people and injuring 11.
- May 23 – South Korea – At a level crossing in Seoul, a train collided with a tanker truck carrying flammable liquid, killing 20 people.
- June 27 – Belgium – Part of a train between Amsterdam and Paris derailed at Neufvilles, killing 10.
- July 23 – Switzerland – A Riviera Express train derailed at Brig, killing six people and injuring 32.
- August 1 – Japan – Two trains collided head on at Imabashi Station, injuring 210 people.
- September 9 – South Africa – A local train to the black township of Daveyton rear-ended an express stopped for signals at Benoni; 31 people were killed, all on the local. The cause is not determined except that sabotage is ruled out.
- September 20 – Yugoslavia – A passenger train and an express train (Direct Orient Express) collided head-on on the Ljubljana-Postojna rail line, between the stations of Preserje and Notranje Gorice. 18 people were killed.
- October 10 – Mexico – A two-car Chihuahua–Los Mochis passenger train collided head-on with a standing freight train and plunged to the bottom of a 18-metre (59-foot) embankment, near Copper Canyon, Chihuahua, killing 24 people and injuring 60. Some of the passengers were riding on the roof. Railroad employees reported seeing about 60 cadavers; farm laborers' deaths were not counted by authorities.
- November 3 – Poland – A Lublin–Wrocław express whose crew had fallen asleep rammed a standing passenger train at Julianka railroad station, killing 25 people and injuring 79.
- November 26 – United States – A defective fissure caused the derailment of several Burlington Northern Railways train cars carrying tanks of propane, butane, and fuel oil as it was passing through the small town of Belt, Montana. Two people were killed and 22 injured.

== 1977 ==
- January 18 – Australia – Granville rail disaster: 83 people are killed at Granville, New South Wales, when a commuter train derails on poor track and hits a bridge support, causing the bridge to collapse and crush part of the train. This is Australia's worst railway accident.
- January 19 – India – Near Benares, a passenger train collided with a stationary train, killing 28 and injuring 78.
- February 4 – United States – Chicago Loop derailment, Chicago: In the worst accident in the system's history, a Chicago Transit Authority elevated train motorman disregarded cab signals and rear-ended another train on the Loop curve at Wabash and Lake Streets during the evening rush hour. Eleven people are killed and over 180 injured while four cars of the rear train derailed and fell to the street below. The motorman was discovered to have marijuana in his possession, although it was never determined if he was impaired in any way.
- February 28 – Spain – A head-on collision of two crowded Catalan Railways suburban trains about 12 miles (20 km) from Barcelona killed 22 people.
- May 30 – India – A flood-weakened bridge collapsed under a train about 70 miles (110 km) from Gauhati (now Guwahati). The locomotive and four cars fell into the river and 85 people were killed.
- June 27 – East Germany – Lebus train collision: Because of a dispatcher working under the influence of medication, at Booßen station, near Frankfurt (Oder), a holiday train from Zittau to Stralsund was diverted onto the branch line to Kietz, where it collided with a freight train, killing 28 people, including the crew of the holiday train; the dispatcher was jailed for five years.
- July 9 – Poland – Psie Pole, near Wrocław: Express "Czech-Russian Friendship" Prague-Moscow collided with locomotive which passed signal at danger: 11-32 people were killed and 15-40 were injured.
- September 5 – United Kingdom – Due to faulty wiring in a lineside relay cabinet, a mail train and a passenger train collided head-on at Farnley Junction, Leeds, West Yorkshire, killing two people and injuring fifteen.
- September 8 – Egypt – As an 11-car Cairo-to-Aswan express passes Asyut at about 70 mph (110 km/h), eight cars derailed. Newspapers reported 70 people killed, but official sources said only 25.
- October 10 – India – Deluxe express passenger train 103 from Howrah to Amritsar rear-ended a freight at Naini, killing at least 61 and injuring 151, 81 seriously.
- November 12 – Mexico – A National Railroad passenger train collided with a gasoline truck at a grade crossing south of Ciudad Juárez, killing 37 people.
- November 27 – East Germany – Bitterfeld: The boiler of a Class 01 steam engine exploded for lack of water, killing nine and injuring 45.

== 1978 ==
- January 4 – Turkey – A head-on collision of two passenger trains at Esenköy killed at least 30 people and injured at least 100.
- February 24 – United States – Waverly tank car explosion, Waverly, Tennessee: A Louisville and Nashville Railroad freight train derailed; one tank car containing liquefied petroleum gas exploded two days later, killing 16 people and injuring 43. Numerous buildings in downtown Waverly were destroyed or damaged by the blast and resulting fires.
- February 25 – Argentina – A passenger train collided with a truck in Sa Pereira, Santa Fe, killing 55 and injuring 56.
- April 15 – Italy – Due to a landslide, the locomotive of a Lecce–Milan train collided with a Bolzano-Rome train in Murazze di Vado, Bologna and derailed, killing 48 people and injuring 76.
- July 6 – United Kingdom – Taunton sleeping car fire, Taunton, England: A fire aboard a British Rail sleeping car travelling from Penzance to London Paddington killed 12 people. Investigation showed that the fire was caused by the careless placement of a plastic bag of linens against a heater in the car's vestibule.
- September 10 – United States – Due to a hotbox, 15 cars of a Conrail freight train derailed at a grade crossing in Miamisburg, Ohio, demolishing a house and killing its three occupants. The ensuing investigation by the National Transportation Safety Board and the local police department resulted in a ruling of homicide in the deaths by the Montgomery County Coroner.
- July 16 – Australia – Queensland Rail (QR) train No.242 (loaded with interstate fruit) at Cooroy lost control while travelling down the Cooroy-Eumundi Range, a 1:50 (2%) gradient. The locomotive and most of the wagons rolled and derailed on a right-hand curve. Some of the wagons landed on top of the derailed locomotive which had crashed into a small embankment. The driver's assistant was killed and the driver was injured. The Cooroy-Eumundi range was regraded to a less steep gradient.

== 1979 ==
- January 4 – Turkey – An accident near Ankara killed 16 people.
- January 9 – Turkey – A rear-end collision between two commuter trains near Ankara killed 30 people and injured about 100.
- January 26 – Bangladesh – Near Chuadanga, a train derailed and overturned, killing at least 70 and injuring at least 300.
- April 8 – United States – Louisville and Nashville Railroad freight train No. 403 derailed between Milligan, Florida and Crestview, Florida. A punctured tank car then leaked anhydrous ammonia, injuring 14.
- April 16 – United Kingdom – Paisley Gilmour Street accident: head-on collision between two DMU trains after starting signal was passed at danger in a case of "ding-ding, and away". Both drivers and five passengers were killed and 67 passengers and a guard were injured. The rule change that led to the crash was reversed.
- May 29 – Canada – A UAC TurboTrain operated by Via Rail on westbound service from Montréal to Toronto caught fire near Morrisburg, Ontario after developing an oil leak. A third of the train was totally destroyed. This was the last major incident for the troubled Turbo Trains, which were retired in 1982.
- July 10 – Italy – A Pompeii-Naples and Naples-Herculaneum commuter train collided head-on in Cercola near Mount Vesuvius, Naples, killing 14 people and injuring 70.
- August 21 – Thailand – A head-on collision of freight and passenger trains at Taling Chan killed 52 people and injured about 200.
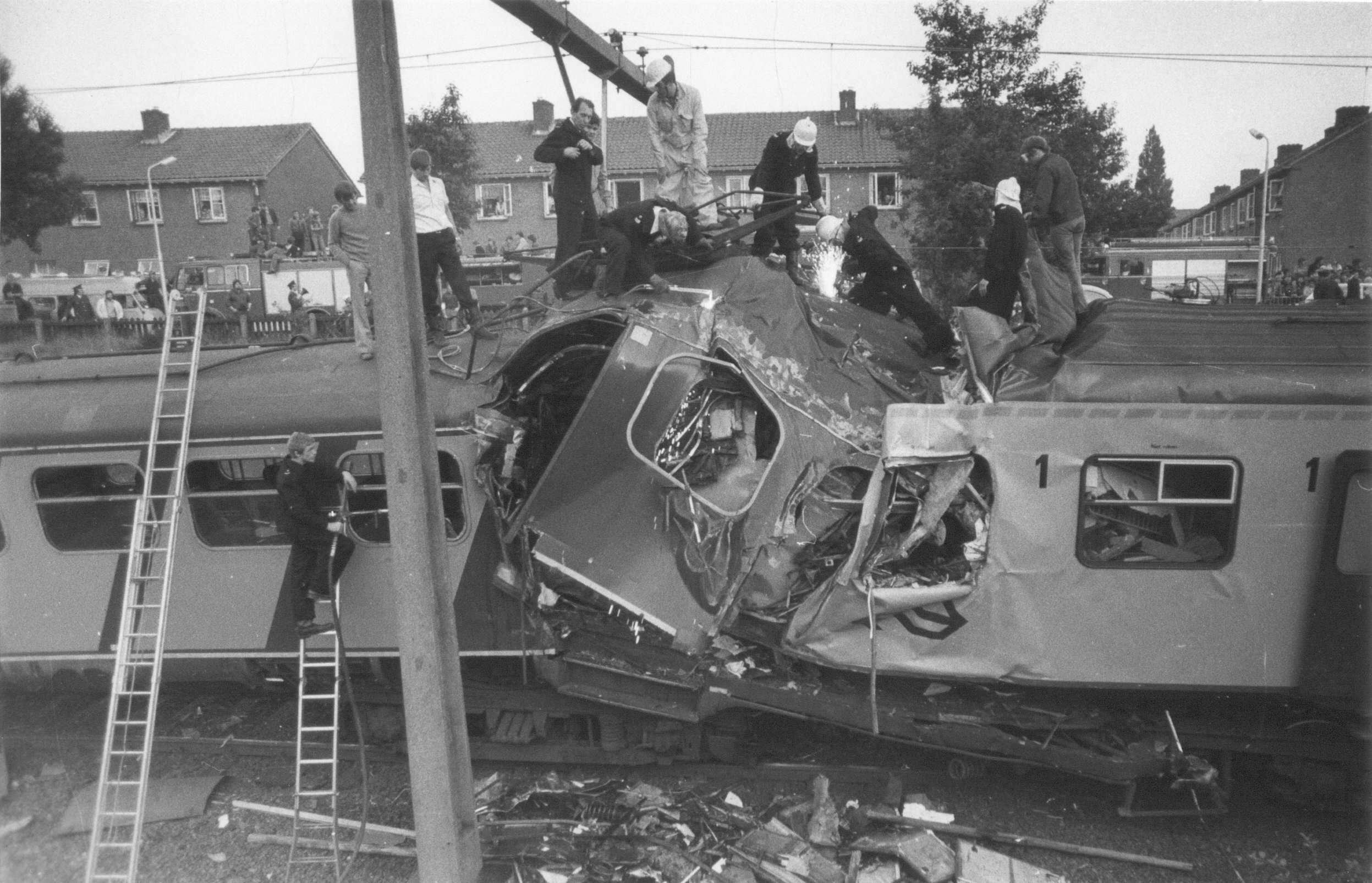
- Aftermath of the Nijmegen disaster.
  August 28 – Netherlands – Nijmegen train collision: Eight people died after two passenger trains collided head-on at Nijmegen.
- September 13 – Yugoslavia – Stalać rail crash: A head-on collision of freight and passenger trains at Stalać (now in Serbia), when a goods train violated signals, possibly because the driver was asleep, and crashed into a passenger train bound for Skopje, killing at least 60 people.
- October 2 – United States – The Southwest Limited derailed at Lawrence, Kansas. Two people were killed and 69 were injured. The cause is excessive speed on a curve.
- October 3 – Ireland – A passenger train and a freight train collided head-on at Arklow, County Wicklow, injuring 29 people.
- October 12 - United States - Harvey, Illinois train collision: The Amtrak Shawnee collided head-on into a stopped Illinois Central Gulf freight train, and derailed, killing two people and injuring 38.
- October 22 – United Kingdom – Invergowrie rail accident: A semaphore signal failed to return completely to danger, and was apparently interpreted wrongly as clear, the resulting accident killed five people.
- October 30 – Djibouti – A freight train—with passengers riding in its empty cars, and unusually many of them due to Eid al-Adha—en route from Dire Dawa, Ethiopia, to Djibouti City ran away due to brake failure and derailed at a bridge near Holhol station, which some cars smashed into. 63 people were killed and 90 injured, mostly women and children.
- November 10 – Canada – Mississauga train derailment in Mississauga, Ontario: tank cars containing propane and chlorine derailed due to a hot box, causing a propane fire that burned for days and released chlorine. More than 250,000 residents were evacuated from the city, the largest peacetime emergency evacuation in North American history until Hurricane Katrina in 2005.
- November 16 – Ireland – Dalkey, County Dublin. One passenger train collided with another, injuring 36 people.
- December 3 – India – A derailment at Londa, Karnataka killed 23 people and injured at least 12.

== See also ==
- List of road accidents – includes level crossing accidents.
- List of rail accidents in Canada
- List of rail accidents in the United Kingdom
- List of Russian rail accidents
- Years in rail transport

== Sources ==
- Earnshaw, Alan (1989). Trains in Trouble: Vol. 5. Penryn: Atlantic Books. ISBN 0-906899-35-4.
- Earnshaw, Alan (1990). Trains in Trouble: Vol. 6. Penryn: Atlantic Books. ISBN 0-906899-37-0.
- Earnshaw, Alan (1991). Trains in Trouble: Vol. 7. Penryn: Atlantic Books. ISBN 0-906899-50-8.
- Glover, John (2001). Southern Electric. Hersham: Ian Allan. ISBN 0-7110-2807-9.
- Haine, Edgar A. (1993). Railroad wrecks. Associated University Presses. ISBN 978-0-8453-4844-4.
- Hall, Stanley (1990). The Railway Detectives. London: Ian Allan. ISBN 0-7110-1929-0.
- Hoole, Ken (1982). Trains in Trouble: Vol. 3. Redruth: Atlantic Books. ISBN 0-906899-05-2.
- Hoole, Ken (1983). Trains in Trouble: Vol. 4. Truro: Atlantic Books. ISBN 0-906899-07-9.
- Kichenside, Geoffrey (1997). Great Train Disasters. Bristol: Siena Books. ISBN 0-75252-630-8.
- Moody, G. T. (1979) [1957]. Southern Electric 1909–1979 (Fifth ed.). Shepperton: Ian Allan Ltd. ISBN 0-7110-0924-4.
- Rolt, L. T. C.; Kichenside, G. M. (1982). Red for Danger: A history of railway accidents and railway safety (4th ed.). Newton Abbot, Devon: David & Charles. ISBN 0-7153-8362-0. OCLC 9526651.
- Semmens, Peter (1994). Railway Disasters of the World: Principal Passenger Train Accidents of the 20th Century. Patrick Stephens Ltd. ISBN 1-85260-323-2.
- Shaw, Robert B. (1978). A History of Railroad Accidents, Safety Precautions and Operating Practices. LCCN 78104064.
- Trevena, Arthur (1981). Trains in Trouble: Vol. 2. Redruth: Atlantic Books. ISBN 0-906899-03-6.
- Vaughan, Adrian (1989). Obstruction Danger. Wellingborough: Patrick Stephens Limited. ISBN 1-85260-055-1.
- "Freight Train Wreck at Houston." ARR Stories: Freight Train Wreck. N.p., n.d. Web. 10 June 2016.
