= Railway accident near Halfweg (1966) =

Railway incident in the Netherlands

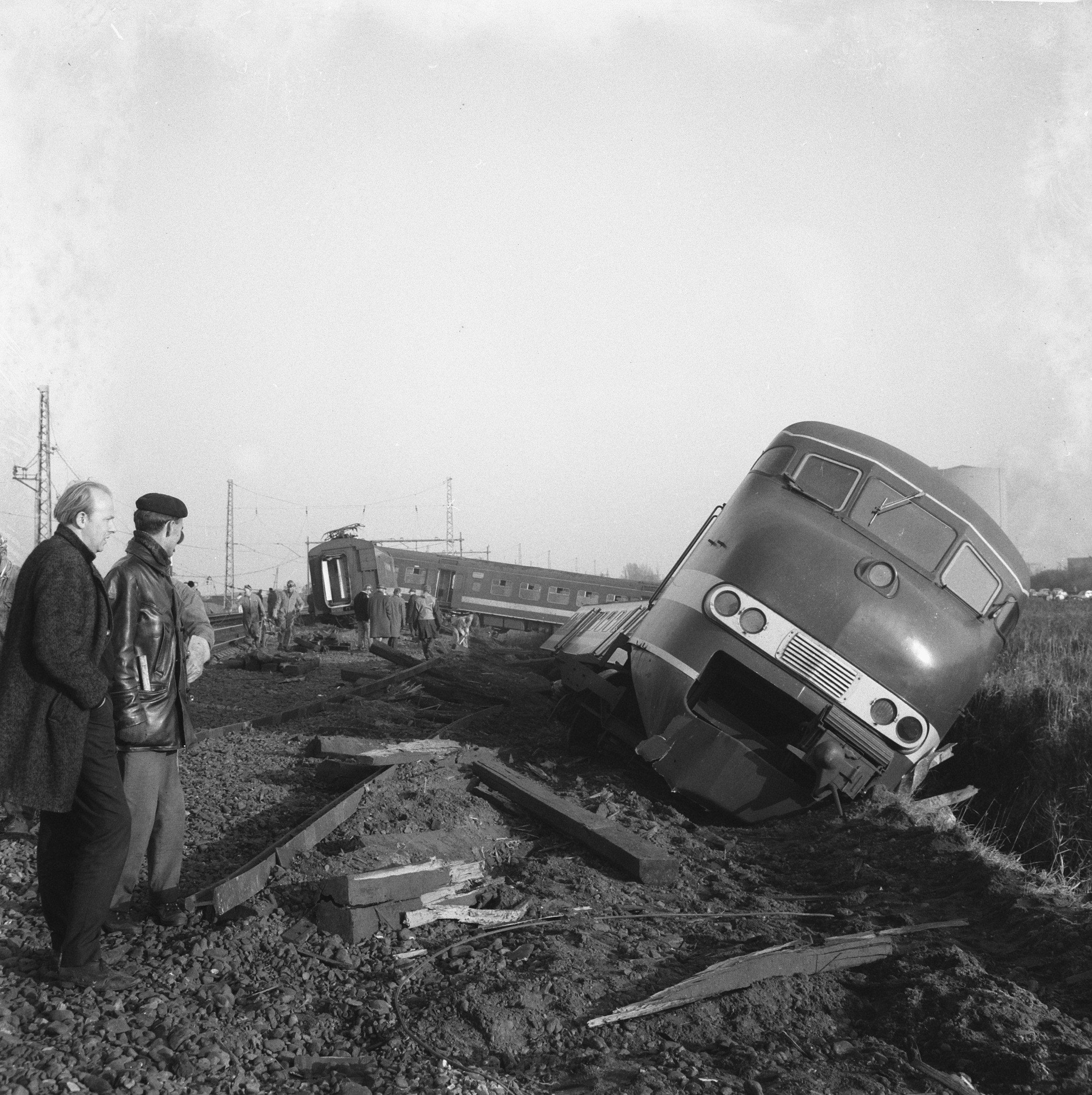
Halfweg, North Holland, 2. November 1966

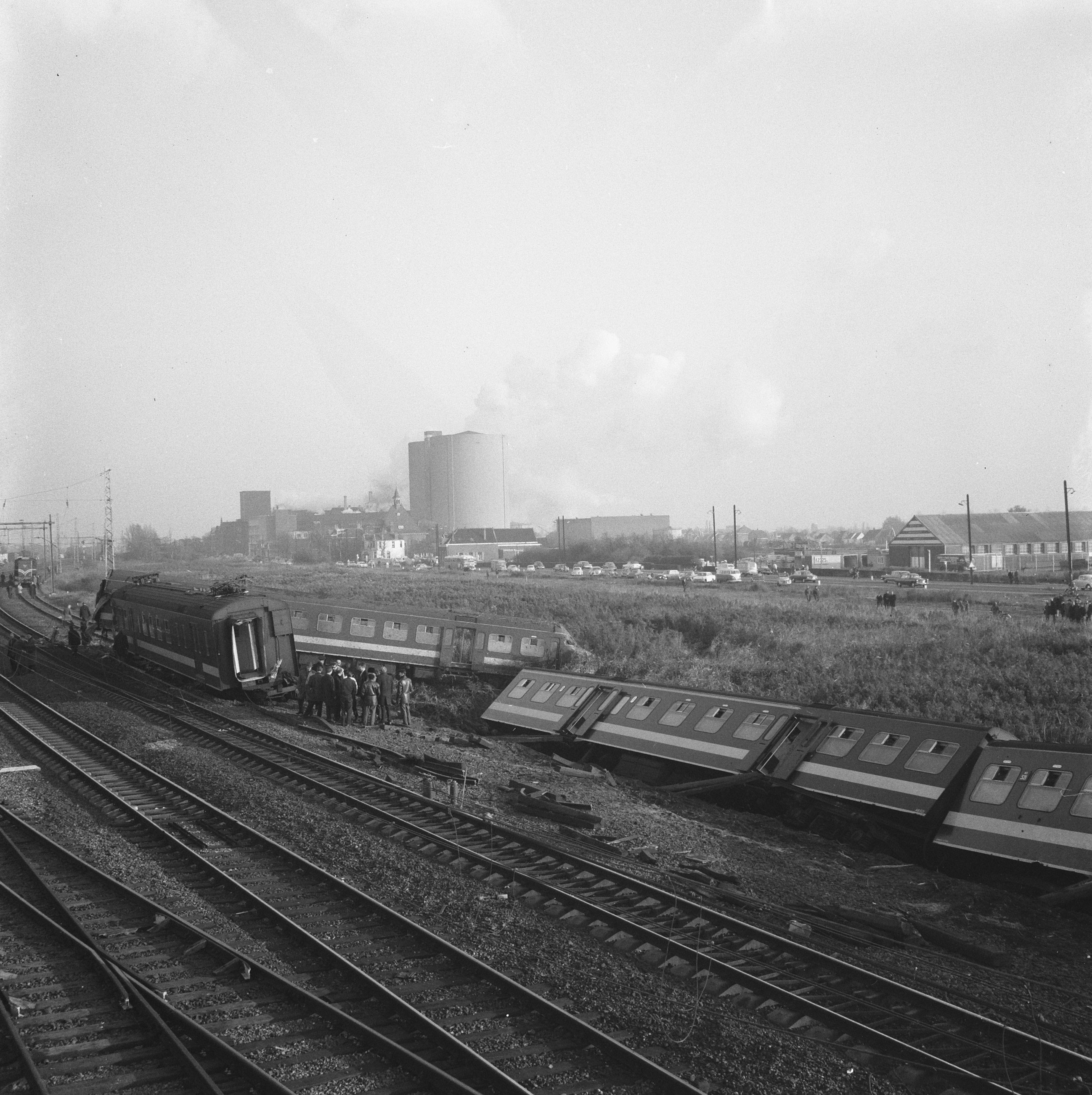
Halfweg, North Holland, 2. November 1966

At the Railway accident near Halfweg on 2. November 1966, an electric multiple unit derailed near Halfweg in North Holland.

== History ==
ElD4 521 (NS Mat '64) derailed as part of train No 1018 near Halfweg on 2. November 1966. The train had sped over a switch and derailed. This led to damages in all cars. After the derailment the leading unit Bk1 came to a standstill beside the track, the BD carriage stood complete beside the track, while the AB- and the other motor unit Bk2 landed on their sides in a ditch. On 7 November 1966 the train arrived for repairs at Revisiebedrijf Haarlem. It was returned to service on 24 July 1967. The opportunity was used to undertake also a small revision (H2).

== See also ==
- Railway accident near Halfweg (1972)
