= Nijmegen train collision =

1979 Netherlands train collision

Nijmegen train disaster
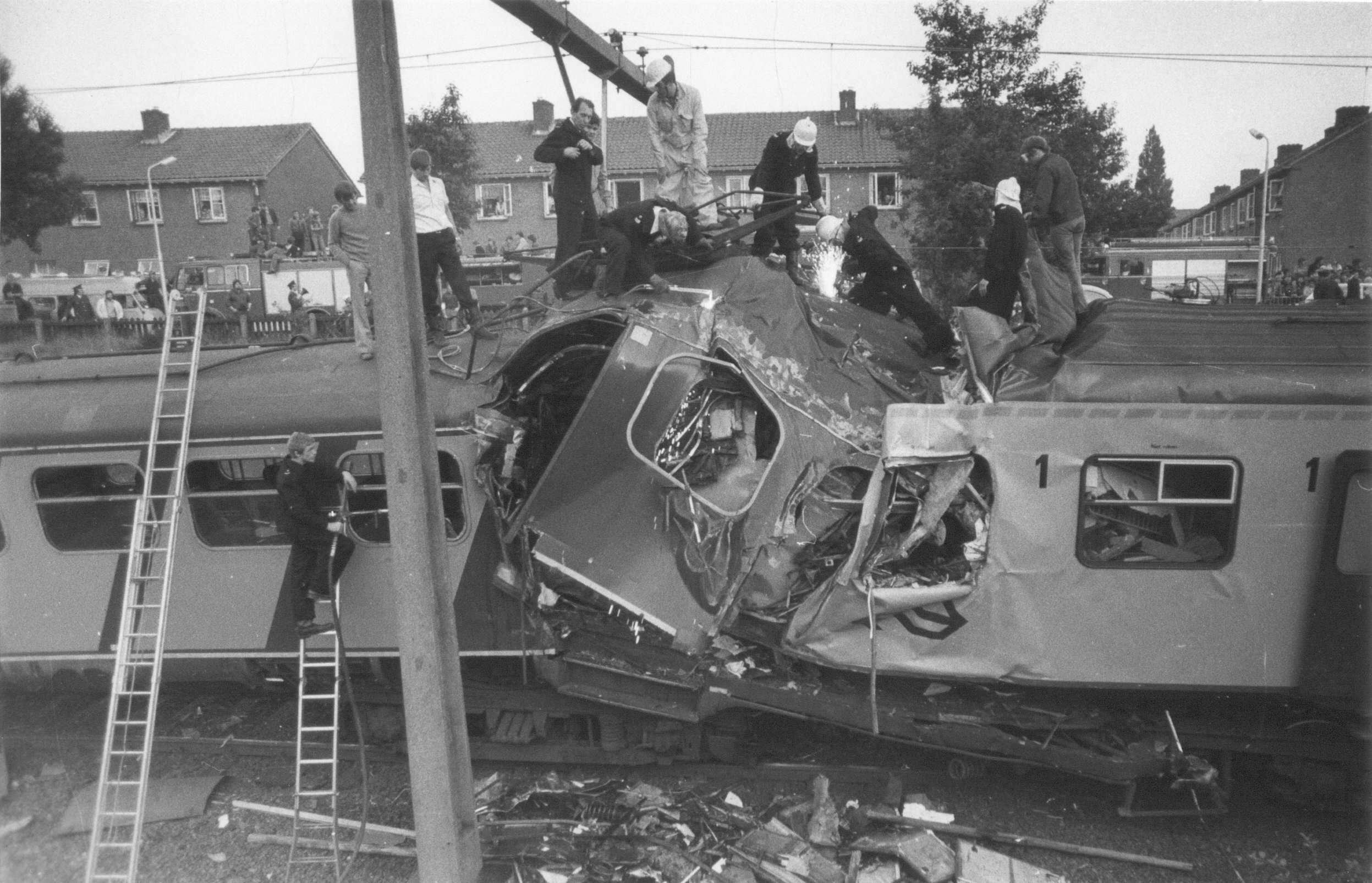
- The aftermath of the accident.

- Location within Netherlands

Details
- Date: 28 August 1979
- Coordinates: 51°49′42.46″N 5°49′39.77″E
- Country: Netherlands
- Line: Tilburg–Nijmegen railway
- Operator: Nederlandse Spoorwegen
- Incident type: Head-on collision

Statistics
- Trains: 2
- Deaths: 8
- Injured: 36

The Nijmegen train disaster was a rail crash in the Netherlands in which two passenger trains—of which one did not contain passengers—collided head-on. The collision happened on 28 August 1979 between Wijchen and Nijmegen, near the Kolpingbuurt neighbourhood in Nijmegen on the railway line Tilburg to Nijmegen. Eight people died in the disaster, seven passengers and the driver of train 4365. Thirty-six people were injured, including the conductor and driver of train 74363.

== Trains ==
Two trains were involved in the crash. The first was an empty train 74363 destined for Nijmegen railway station. This train consisted of a multiple unit of the Mat '64 Plan V 936 type. The second was train 4365 consisting of two two-carriage multiple units of the Mat '46 type, units 256 and 244. Train 74363 traveled at about 5 km/h, the passenger train 4365 at about 90 km/h.

== See also ==
- List of rail accidents (1970–1979)
