= Vierzy tunnel disaster =

1972 tunnel collapse in France

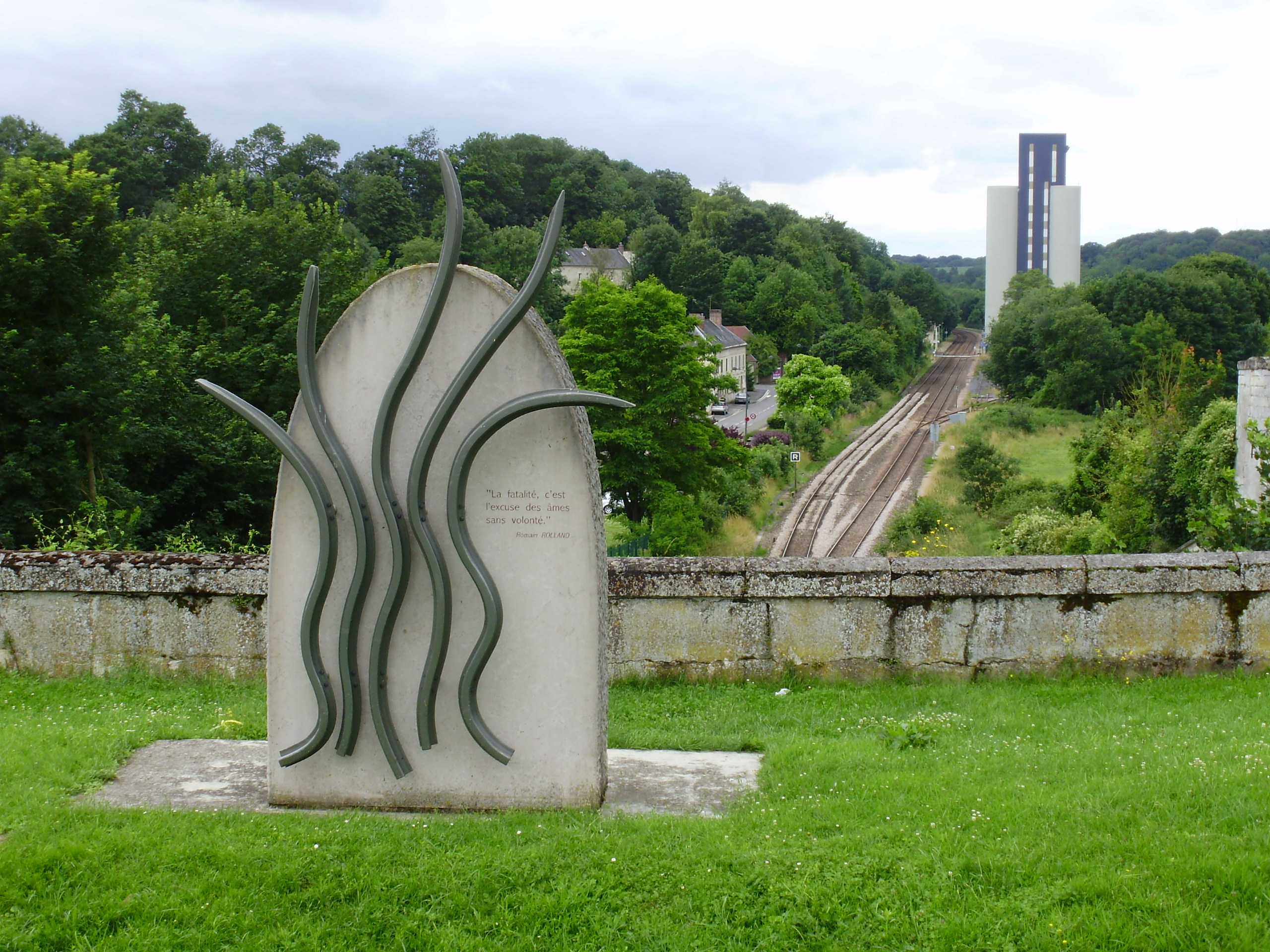
- Monument in memory of the victims of the tunnel collapse above its southwest entrance

Details
- Date: 16 June 1972; 8:21 PM (CET)
- Location: Vierzy Tunnel, Aisne Department
- Coordinates: 49.299047°N 3.293825°E
- Country: France
- Line: La Plaine to Hirson and Anor
- Operator: SNCF
- Incident type: Train wrecks with debris
- Cause: Partial tunnel collapse

Statistics
- Trains: 2
- Deaths: 108
- Injured: 240

The Vierzy tunnel disaster was a deadly train collision that occurred on June 16, 1972 in Vierzy, in the Aisne department of France on the line from La Plaine to Hirson.

Two trains traveling in opposite directions entered the Vierzy tunnel, about 40 km (25 mi) south of Laon, and struck debris from a partial collapse of the tunnel's vault, which had occurred a few minutes earlier. The investigation determined that the collapse had been caused by defects linked to the destruction of the tunnel during the Franco-Prussian war and the First and Second World Wars, made worse by the poor nature of the soil. The disaster killed 108 people, making it the deadliest rail accident in France since 1933 and the third deadliest rail accident in French history.

== Background ==
=== History of Vierzy tunnel ===
The Vierzy tunnel is located on the line from La Plaine to Hirson and Anor, which mainly connects Paris to Laon. It was put into service on February 2, 1862 during the extension of the line from Villers-Cotterêts to Soissons. Construction was made difficult by the inconsistency of the soil, which was composed of weak granite.

In 1914, while retreating in the face of the German advance, the French Army dynamited a section of the tunnel. The explosion caused the collapse of the vault, creating a bell-shaped cavity above the structure. Repair work began in 1915 and it was then that it was decided not to fill in the cavity but to integrate it into the vault by reinforcing it with masonry. The section destroyed during the First World War is thus recognizable by the unusual height of the vault at this point, higher than the original one running over the rest of the underground passage.

=== Before the disaster ===
In 1972, the Vierzy tunnel had changed little since the First World War. While the line was electrified between Saint-Denis and Crépy-en-Valois in 1958, the section beyond was operated by diesel trains. The tunnel then had two tracks, allowing two trains from opposite directions to use it simultaneously.

In early 1972, noticing cracks in the vault and falling bricks from the masonry, the SNCF began gradually renovating the tunnel. The process involved removing part of the masonry, placing temporary supports and then spraying shotcrete. This work was underway at the time of the disaster.

== Disaster ==
The evening of June 16, 1972, at 8:21 PM, a deadheading train crossed the tunnel on track one. This was the last locomotive to go through the tunnel before the passage of the two trains, one bound for Laon and the other for Paris, which usually passed each other in the tunnel or its immediate vicinity soon after. Shortly after the deadheading train passed, the vault of the tunnel partially collapsed and a landslide of debris measuring 700 cubic metres blocked the track.

At 8:54 PM, Train 2841 traveling from Paris to Laon entered the tunnel at a speed of 108 km/h (67 mph). This time the train was particularly full with many students and workers returning for the weekend as well as soldiers on leave. A few moments later, the leading car hit the debris and stopped abruptly, causing the second car to be thrown outward by centrifugal force, detaching itself from the first car and stopping parallel to it at the foot of the landslide, while the third car crashed into the rear of the first two. Then, at 8:56 PM another train, Train 7844 headed for Paris, also entered the tunnel and hit the debris. The first car slid down the slope of rocks and became embedded in what remained of the tunnel's vault, while the second car crushed the rear of the first.

== Rescue attempt ==
The alert was given at 9:11 PM by the conductor of Train 7844, calling from a trackside telephone connected to Vierzy station. Eight volunteer rescuers arrived on the scene before the general alert was given. At 10 PM the Aisne department activated the ORSEC plan.

At the height of the operation, around 500 rescuers were working in the tunnel to free victims from the rubble. For several days, they had to work in the dark and the heat, making their way through the tangled sheets of metal. On Monday June 19, it was declared that the chances of finding new survivors were zero. The last of the debris is finally cleared by June 23.

== Cause ==
The tunnel, which suffered from defects due to the poor materials used during its construction and damage caused by multiple wars, underwent major work to repair the vault in 1972.

The partial collapse of the vault, linked to the repair work in progress, caused the collision with the rockfall of two trains.

Other causes have been put forward, including that the collapse was caused by vibrations from the simultaneous passage of the two trains, but this information is denied by the investigation report.

During its session of May 2, 1973, the National Assembly raised this matter, following a question from a deputy from Aisne, André Rossi.

Yves Guéna, Minister of Transport, replied:

"Immediately [after the disaster], the then Minister of Transport, Mr. Jean Chamant, established a commission of inquiry chaired by General Engineer Rerolle. This commission had the dual mission of investigating all possible causes of this disaster and making recommendations to prevent a repeat of such an accident. This same decision specified that an initial report would be submitted [...]

The text of this report was published in full in the Official Journal of April 11, 1973, Administrative Documents edition. [...] On July 21, 1971, the SNCF decided to repair the damaged roof covering elements and replace the brick masonry, which sometimes crumbled and fell, with shotcrete to an average thickness of seven centimeters. The operations were carried out in the following order: demolition of the brick covering, cleaning of the roof, installation of reinforcement, and spraying of the concrete.

The work began with the demolition and clearing of the most damaged section, a ring approximately six and a half meters long located—it should be noted—five meters from the southern limit of the June 16th landslide. The worksite was then opened about forty meters further north, returning to the cleared section. The progress of the operations resulted in the six and a half meter strip remaining as it was for two months, without any early signs of damage being observed.

The sequence of construction phases, where demolition proceeded faster than the subsequent steps, resulted on June 16, 1972, in an exposed and cleared length slightly longer than the collapsed section. The investigation commission concluded that the ultimate cause of the vault rupture seems to be the stripping away of bricks over a large length."

Original excerpt:

Immédiatement, le ministre des transports de l'époque, M. Jean Chamant, constituait une commission d'enquête présidée par l'ingénieur général Rerolle. Cette commission avait la double mission de rechercher les causes de tous ordres qui avaient pu provoquer cette catastrophe et de faire toutes recommandations en vue d'éviter le renouvellement d'un tel accident. Cette même décision précisait qu'un premier rapport serait déposé [...]

Le texte de ce rapport a été publié intégralement au Journal officiel du 11 avril 1973, édition des Documents administratifs. [...] Le 21 juillet 1971, la S.N.C.F. décide de procéder à une réfection des éléments de revêtement abîmés de la voûte et de remplacer les rouleaux de briques, qui parfois s'effritaient et tombaient, par du béton projeté sur une épaisseur moyenne de sept centimètres. Les opérations étaient menées dans l'ordre suivant : démolition du revêtement de briques, curetage de la voûte, pose des armatures et projection du béton.

Les travaux ont commencé par la démolition et la purge de la partie la plus dégradée, soit un anneau d'environ six mètres cinquante situé — il faut le noter — à cinq mètres de la limite sud de l'éboulis du 16 juin. Le chantier a été ensuite ouvert à une quarantaine de mètres plus au nord, en revenant vers la partie dégarnie. Le déroulement des opérations a fait que la bande de six mètres cinquante est restée en l'état pendant deux mois, sans d'ailleurs qu'aucun signe précurseur de désordre fût perçu.

La succession des phases du chantier, où la démolition allait plus vite que les suivantes, s'est traduite le 16 juin 1972 par une longueur dégarnie et purgée légèrement supérieure à la partie effondrée. La commission d'enquête conclut que la cause dernière de la rupture de la voûte parait bien être le dégarnissage des briques sur une grande longueur"

== Aftermath ==
The tunnel vault was rebuilt with lining. The reduced useful width led to its single-track construction. The Vauxaillon tunnel, located on the same line between Soissons and Laon and built to the same standards, as well as the Coudray tunnel, located between Paris and Beauvais, were also rebuilt using the same process.

A memorial was erected in Vierzy, above the Paris entrance to the tunnel, with a tall stele commemorating the tragedy and a quote from the author Romain Rolland: "Fate is the excuse of souls without will" (la fatalité, c'est l'excuse des âmes sans volonté), meaning that fate is an excuse used by those who lack the determination or willpower to take responsibility. On this stele and on another monument near the (desacralized) Abbey of Saint-Léger in Soissons, the chapel of rest where all the bodies had been gathered, appear the names of the 108 victims of the disaster.

Photograph gallery

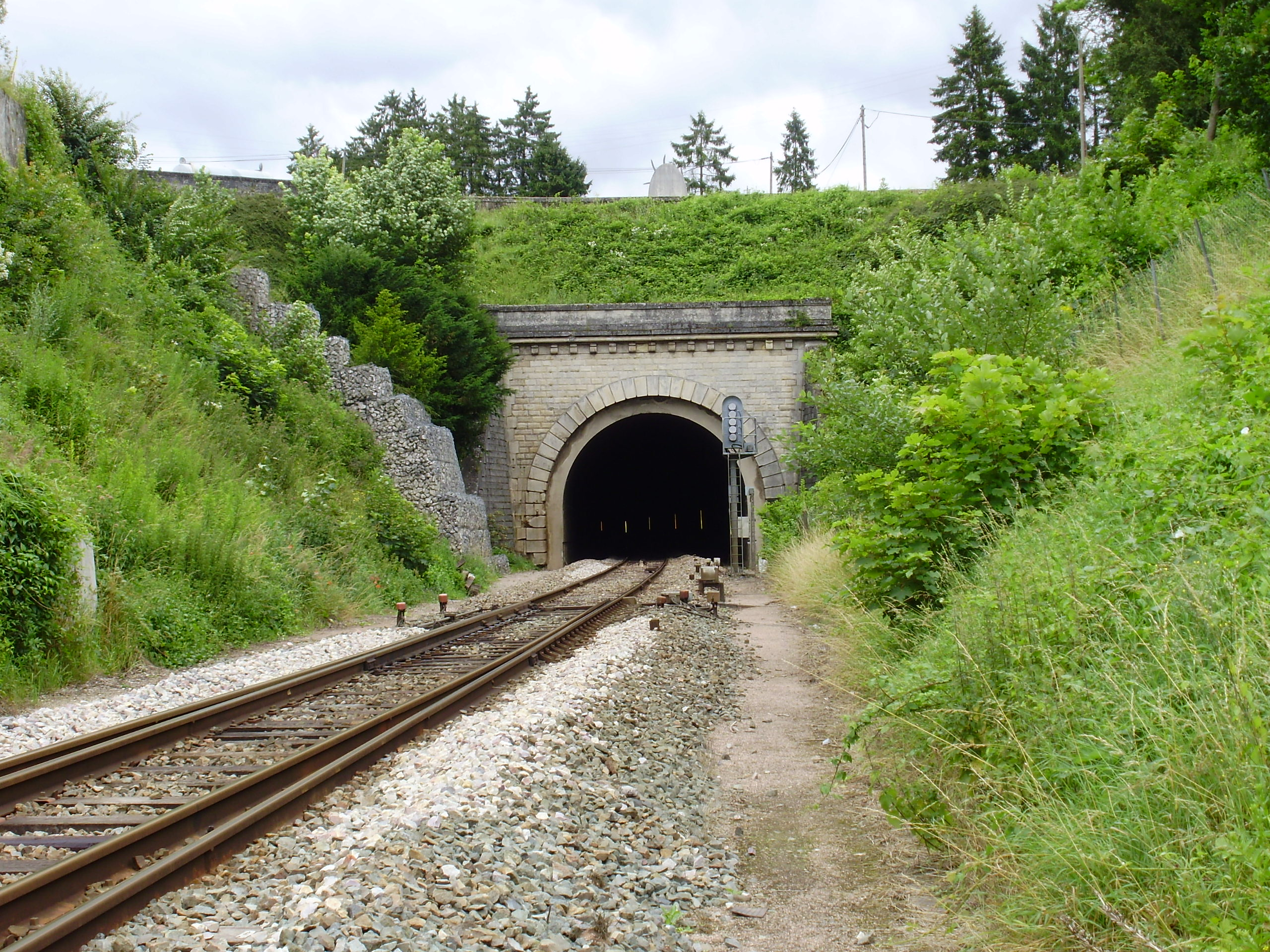
South-west entrance of the tunnel at Vierzy.

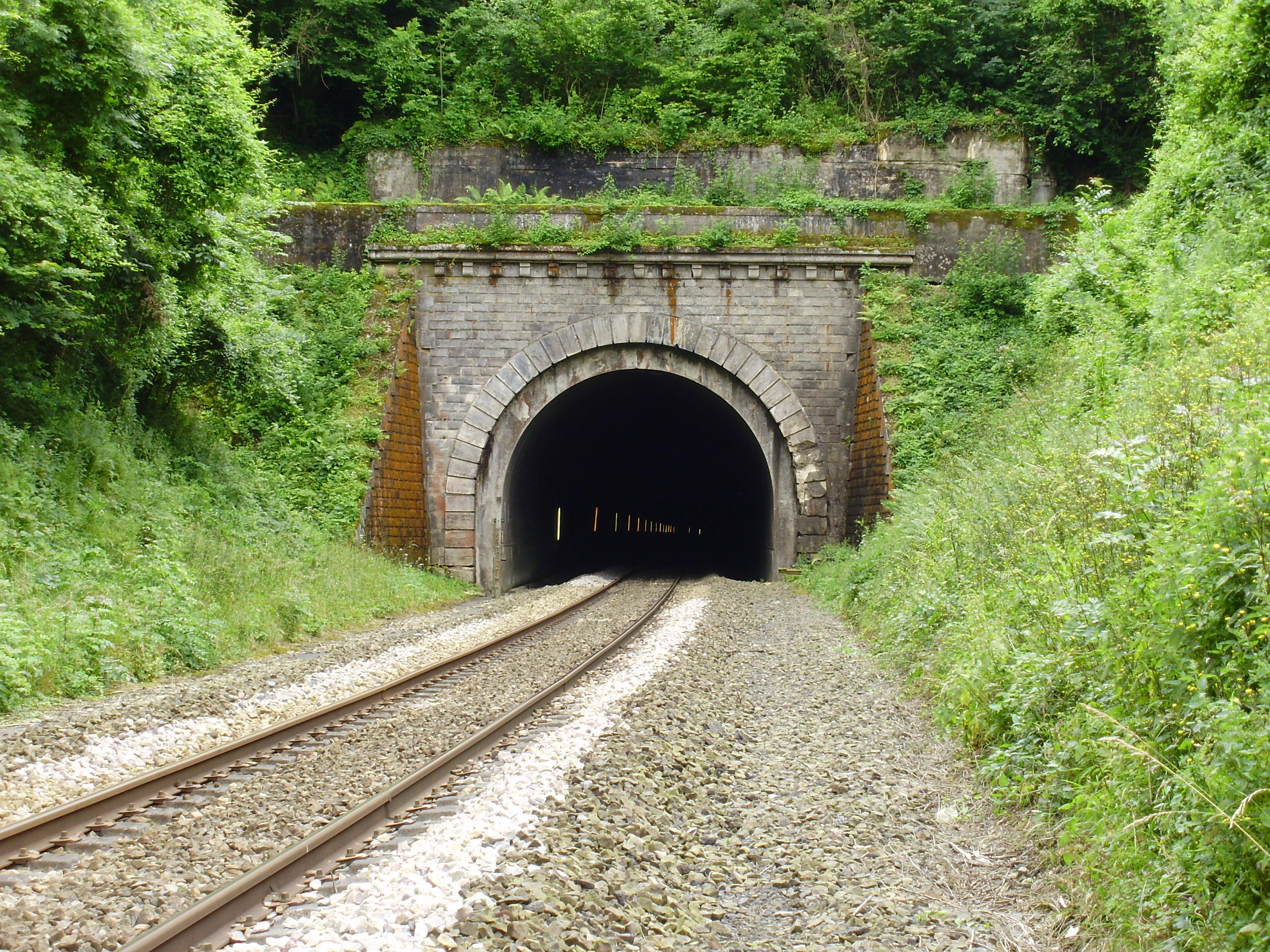
North-east entrance of the tunnel on the Villemontoire end.

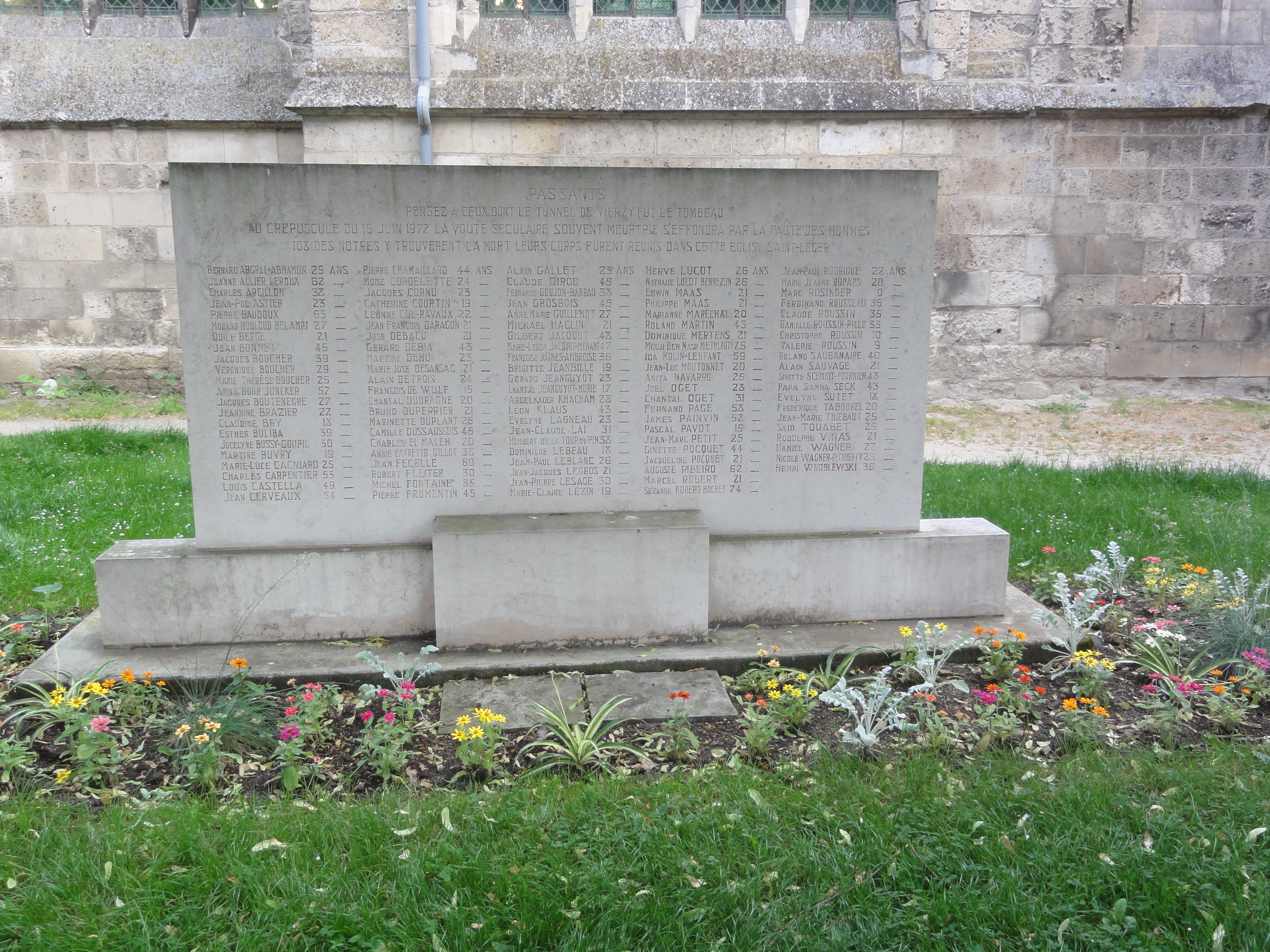
Memorial at the foot of the Saint-Léger church in Soissons.

== See also ==
- List of disasters in France by death toll

== Bibliography ==
- Degenève, Gilles; Deshayes, Boris (2016-12-15). Le tunnel ferroviaire de Vierzy - Histoire de la tragédie du 16 juin 1972 [The Vierzy Railway Tunnel] (in French). Soissons: Éditions du Vase Communicant. p. 133. ISBN 979-10-96827-00-8.
- Arnould, M. (2010). "Tunnel ferroviaire de Vierzy : vieillissement, altération des maçonneries calcaires - causes de l'effondrement catastrophique du 16 juin 1972". Revue Française de Géotechnique (131–132). EDP Sciences. doi:10.1051/geotech/2010131093.
