= El Cuervo railway accident =

1972 railway incident in Spain

Details
- Date: 21 July 1972; 07:36
- Location: Between El Cuervo and Lebrija stations
- Coordinates: 36°52′41″N 6°06′22″W
- Country: Spain

Statistics
- Trains: 2
- Passengers: 700
- Deaths: 86
- Injured: >150

The El Cuervo train accident occurred in Spain at 7:36 a.m. on 21 July 1972, at kilometer 86.2 of the line connecting Cádiz and Seville, near the La Junquera estate, three kilometers from the old El Cuervo station and seven kilometers from the Lebrija station. It was caused by a head-on collision between two trains: a medium-distance double railcar set traveling between Cádiz and Seville, and a long-distance express train running between Madrid and Cádiz. As a result of the accident, 86 people died and more than 150 were injured.

== Description ==
The express train was carrying approximately 500 people and consisted of 14 carriages hauled by a powerful Alco 2100 series diesel-electric locomotive (number 2118). (Note: According to the old Renfe numbering system; from 1971 onwards, this class was renumbered as series 321.) The railcar set consisted of four carriages and was carrying around 200 people. Their speeds were 90 kilometres per hour (56 mph) for the express train and 80 kilometres per hour (50 mph) for the railcar set. Both trains braked before the impact, but the reduction in speed was not enough to avoid the collision.

At the time of the accident, the Cádiz-Seville line was a single track, although trains ran in both directions. To make this possible, there were some sections of secondary lines along the route regulated by signals, where one of the trains had to wait when it encountered the train traveling in the opposite direction, before resuming its journey. Following this established system, the railcar set routinely stopped on a siding at El Cuervo station to wait for the express train from Madrid. According to the investigation carried out by RENFE, the accident was due to the fact that the train driver did not respect the red signal that existed at the El Cuervo station and resumed the journey without making the necessary wait. As a result, the two trains traveled on the same track simultaneously but in opposite directions, the local train in the El Cuervo-Lebrija direction and the express in the Lebrija-El Cuervo direction. They only realized the danger when they saw each other, but it was too late to avoid the head-on collision.

After the impact occurred, the express train's diesel engine continued moving for about 300 meters. The first three cars of the railcar set suffered the most damage, being completely crushed, while only the mail car of the express train was affected. The force of the collision was such that when the trains finally stopped, the first cars of the railcar set were lying on top of the express train's engine, and the wreckage trapped numerous dead and injured people.
