= White Haven, Pennsylvania =

Borough in Pennsylvania, US

- Borough
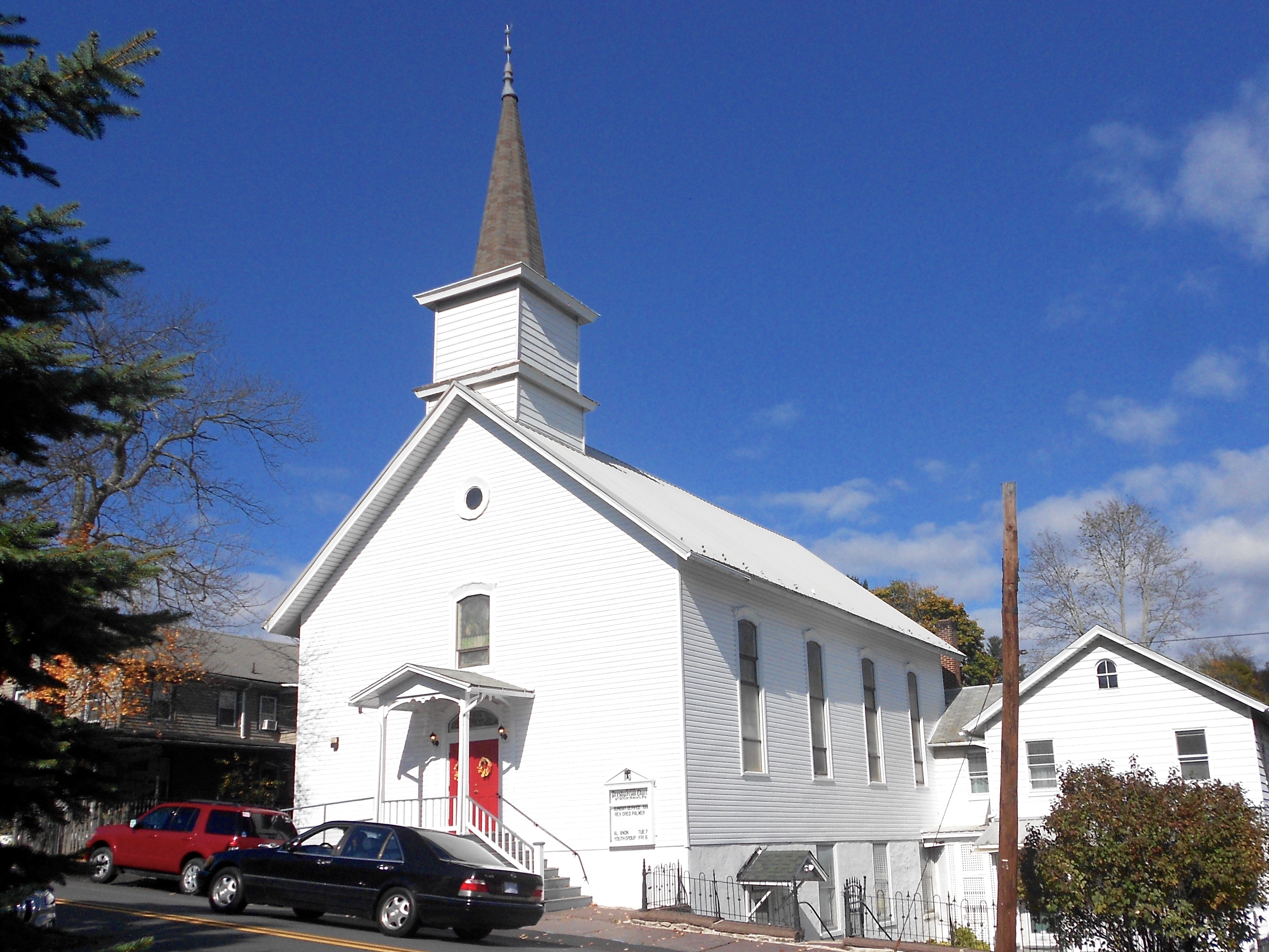
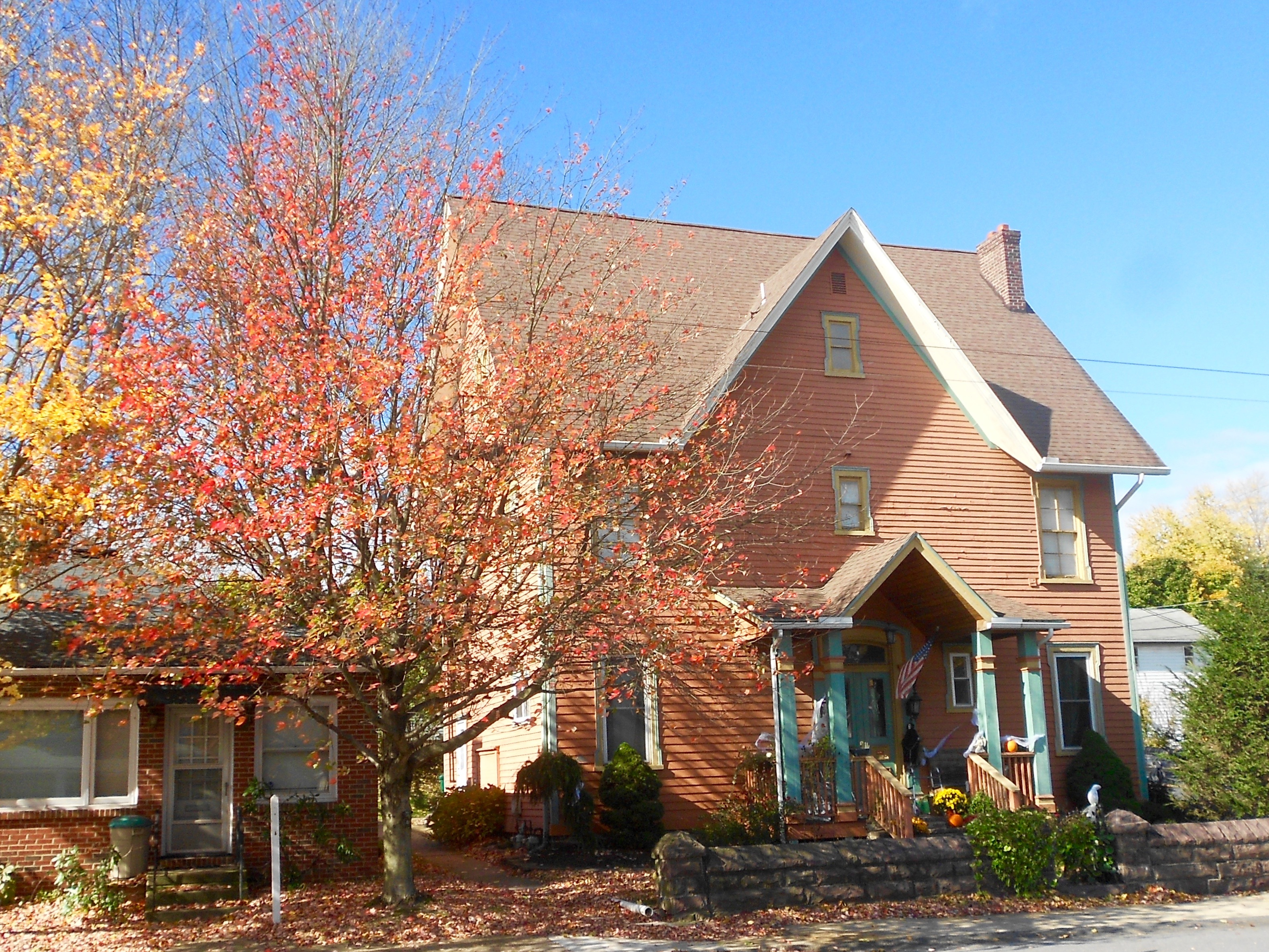
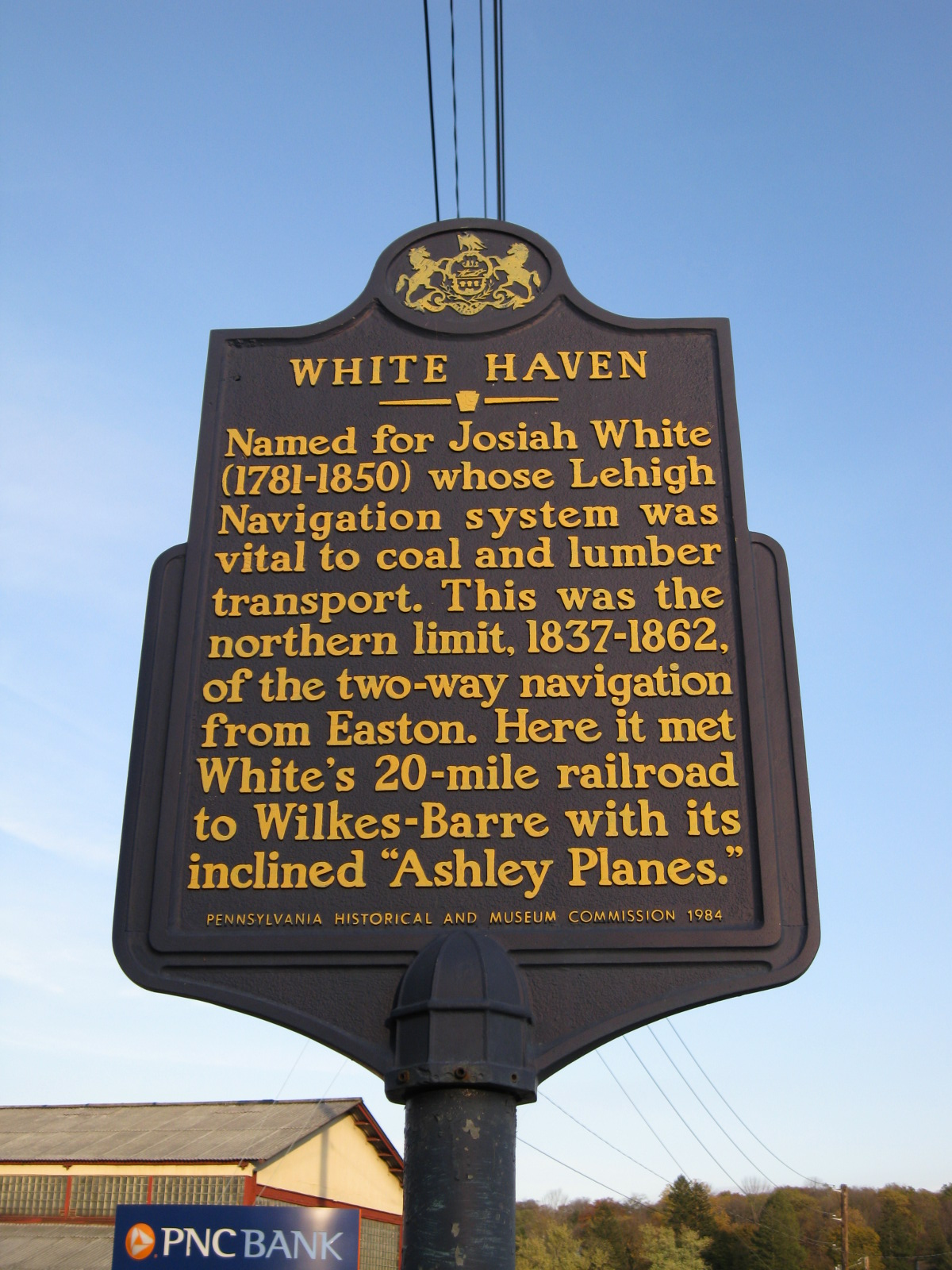
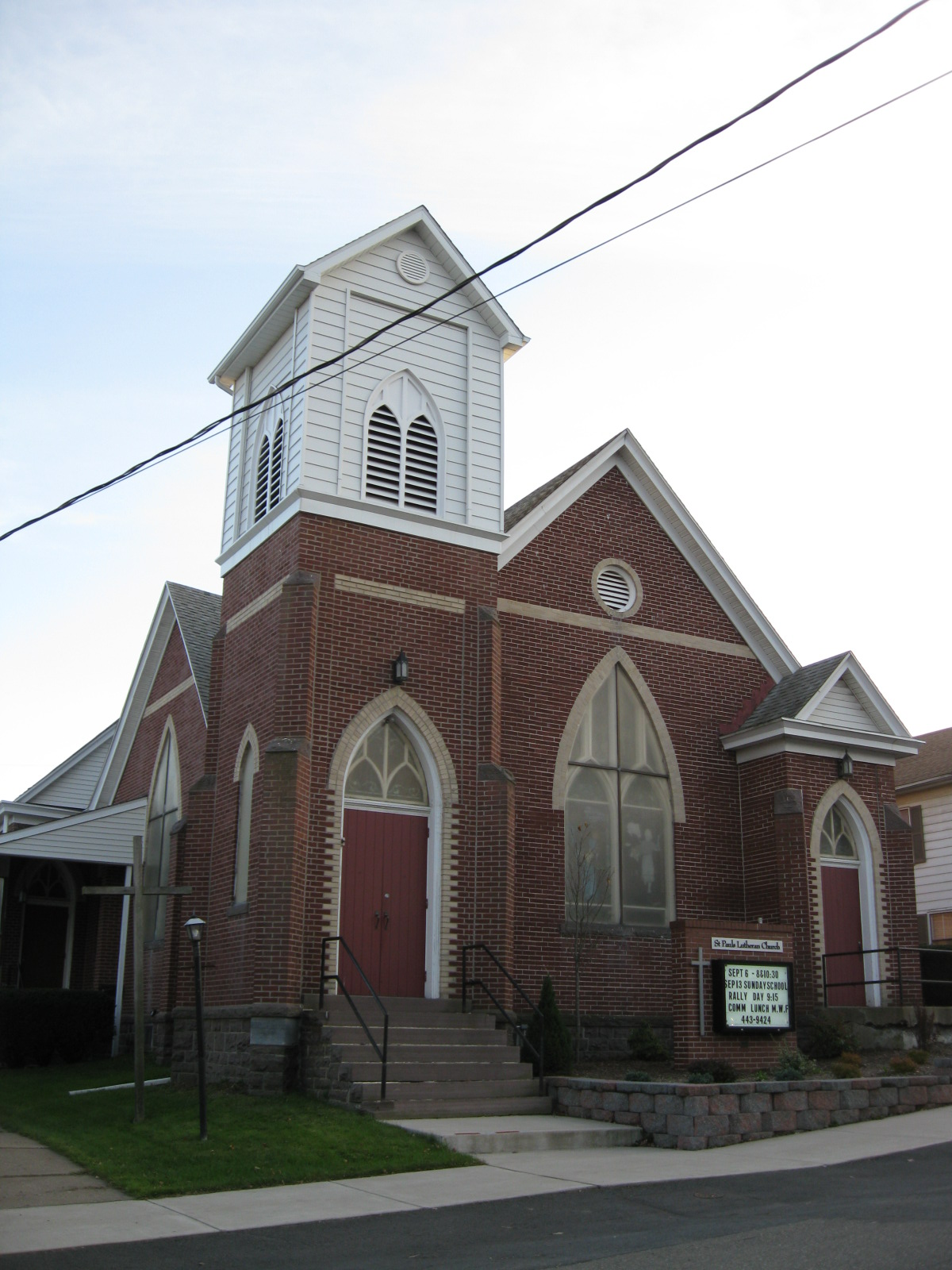
- From top, left to right: A Presbyterian church, a house in the borough, White Haven historical marker, a church in the borough

- Location of White Haven in Luzerne County, Pennsylvania (left) and of Luzerne County in Pennsylvania (right)

- Location within Pennsylvania Location within the United States
- Coordinates: 41°03′34″N 75°46′34″W
- Country: United States
- State: Pennsylvania
- County: Luzerne
- Settled: 1865
- Incorporated: 1842

Government
  - Type: Borough Council

Area
  - Total: 1.23 sq mi (3.19 km^{2})
  - Land: 1.20 sq mi (3.11 km^{2})
  - Water: 0.031 sq mi (0.08 km^{2})
- Elevation: 1,221 ft (372 m)

Population (2020)
  - Total: 1,166
  - Density: 972/sq mi (375.2/km^{2})
- Time zone: UTC-5 (Eastern (EST))
  - Summer (DST): UTC-4 (EDT)
- ZIP Code: 18661
- Area code: 570
- FIPS code: 42-84552
- Website: www.whitehavenborough.org

White Haven is a borough in Luzerne County, Pennsylvania, United States. It is located along the Lehigh River. The population was 1,163 at the 2020 census.

== History ==
=== Establishment ===
White Haven was created in 1824 by industrialist Josiah White. It was incorporated as a borough in 1842.

=== Coal mining and railroads ===
Early European explorers to the Wyoming Valley encountered a new form of coal, known as anthracite, that was abundant throughout the Coal Region. Anthracite was a valuable commodity without a good use. On February 11, 1808, Wilkes-Barre Judge Jesse Fell created the first iron grate in the valley to successfully burn anthracite. This invention increased the popularity of anthracite as a fuel source. This led to the expansion of the coal industry in Northeastern Pennsylvania.

Throughout the 1800s, canals and railroads were constructed to aid in the mining and transportation of coal. Luzerne County witnessed a population boom with the expansion of the coal mining industry.

The Lehigh Coal and Navigation Company chartered the Lehigh and Susquehanna Railroad on March 31, 1837, in order to link Wilkes-Barre to White Haven. Construction of the railroad began in 1839 and was completed in the 1840s. The arduous 19.58-mile (31.51 km) route required the construction of a tunnel and three inclined planes, including Ashley Planes.

With the completion of the Lehigh and Susquehanna Railroad, the canal industry, which had existed for no more than one generation, faced a rapid extinction. The Lehigh and Susquehanna Railroad moved Wyoming Valley anthracite from its various coal fields to White Haven over the Appalachian Mountains that had posed such a challenge to settlers for 150 years prior to the development of these rail lines.

Once the Lehigh and Susquehanna Railroad reached White Haven, an extensive transportation network expeditiously and economically delivered the Wyoming Valley's anthracite to a waiting market. By 1867, the Lehigh Valley Railroad, which was first established in the Hazleton area's coal fields, was linked to Wilkes-Barre, and then in 1869, the Lehigh Valley Railroad was connected to other rail systems in New York state.

== Geography ==
White Haven is located at 41°3′34″N 75°46′34″W (41.059532, -75.776123). The borough is 17 miles (27 km) south of Wilkes-Barre, and 4 miles (6 km) west of the I-476 and I-80 interchange. According to the U.S. Census Bureau, the borough has a total area of 1.2 square miles (3.2 km^{2}), of which 1.2 square miles (3.2 km^{2}) is land and 0.04 square miles (0.1 km^{2}), or 2.12%, is water. White Haven's elevation is 1,221 feet (372 m) above sea level. It contains part of the census-designated place of Mountain Top.

=== Townscape ===
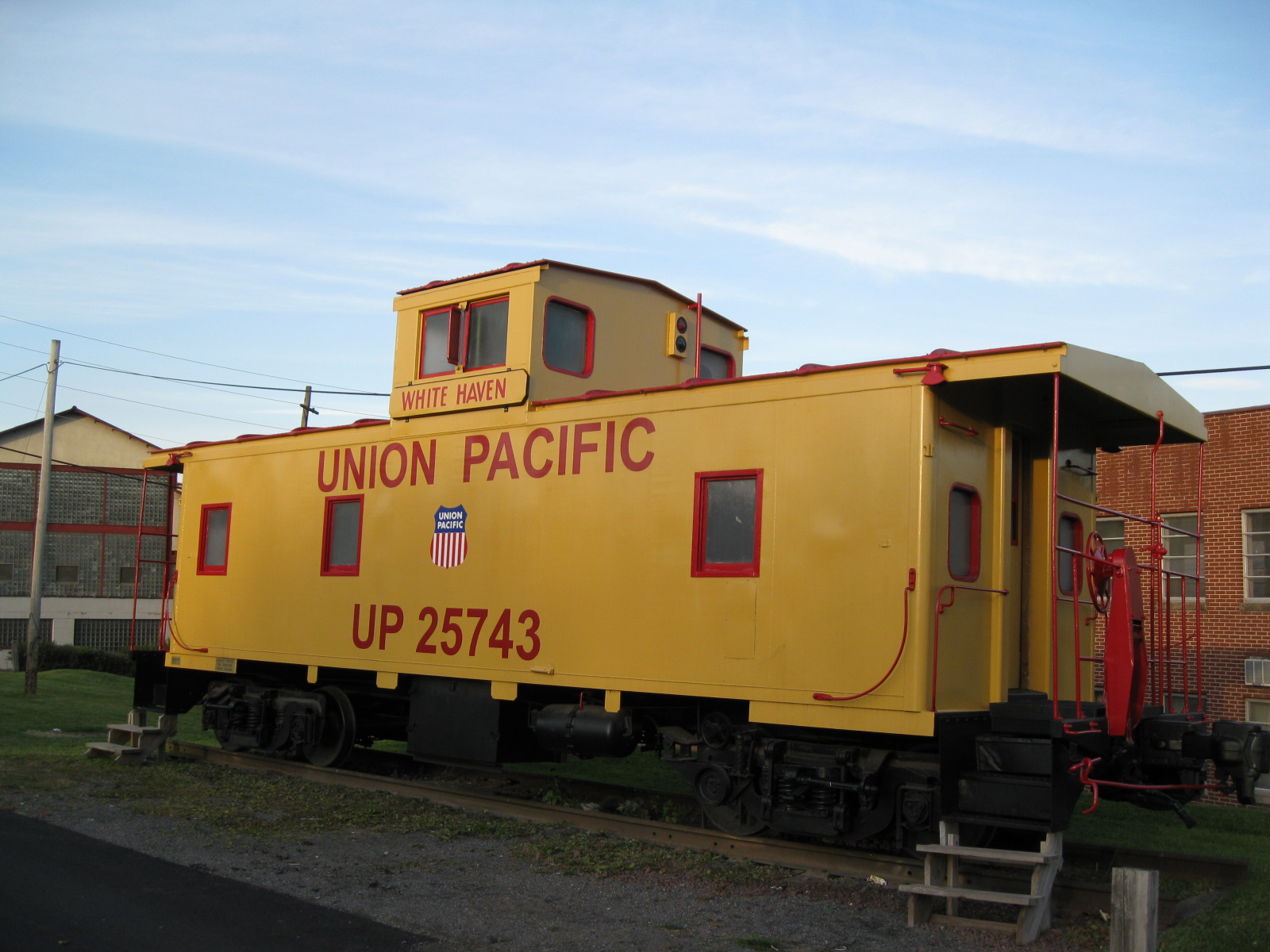
A caboose in White Haven

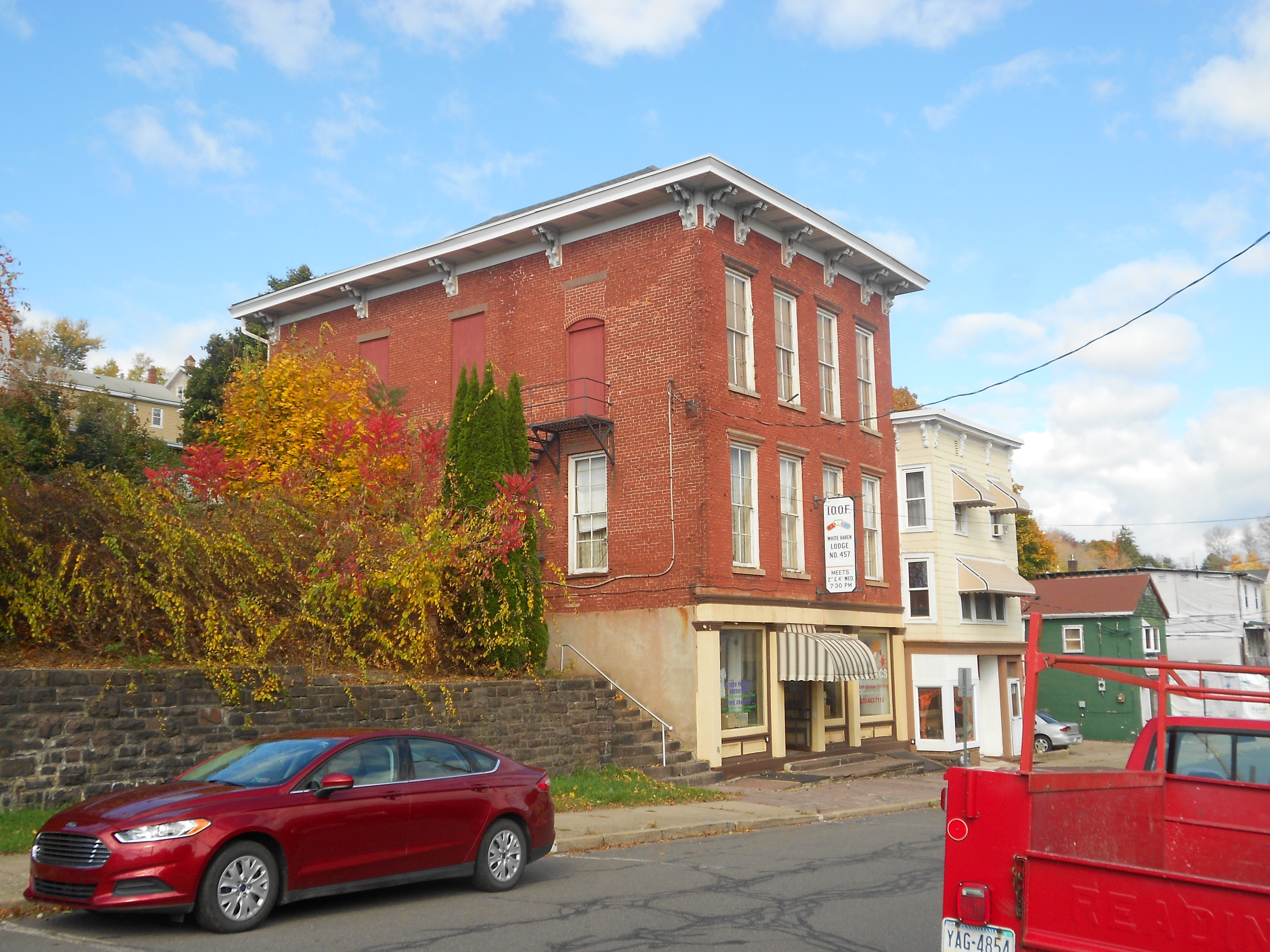
Odd Fellows Lodge in White Haven

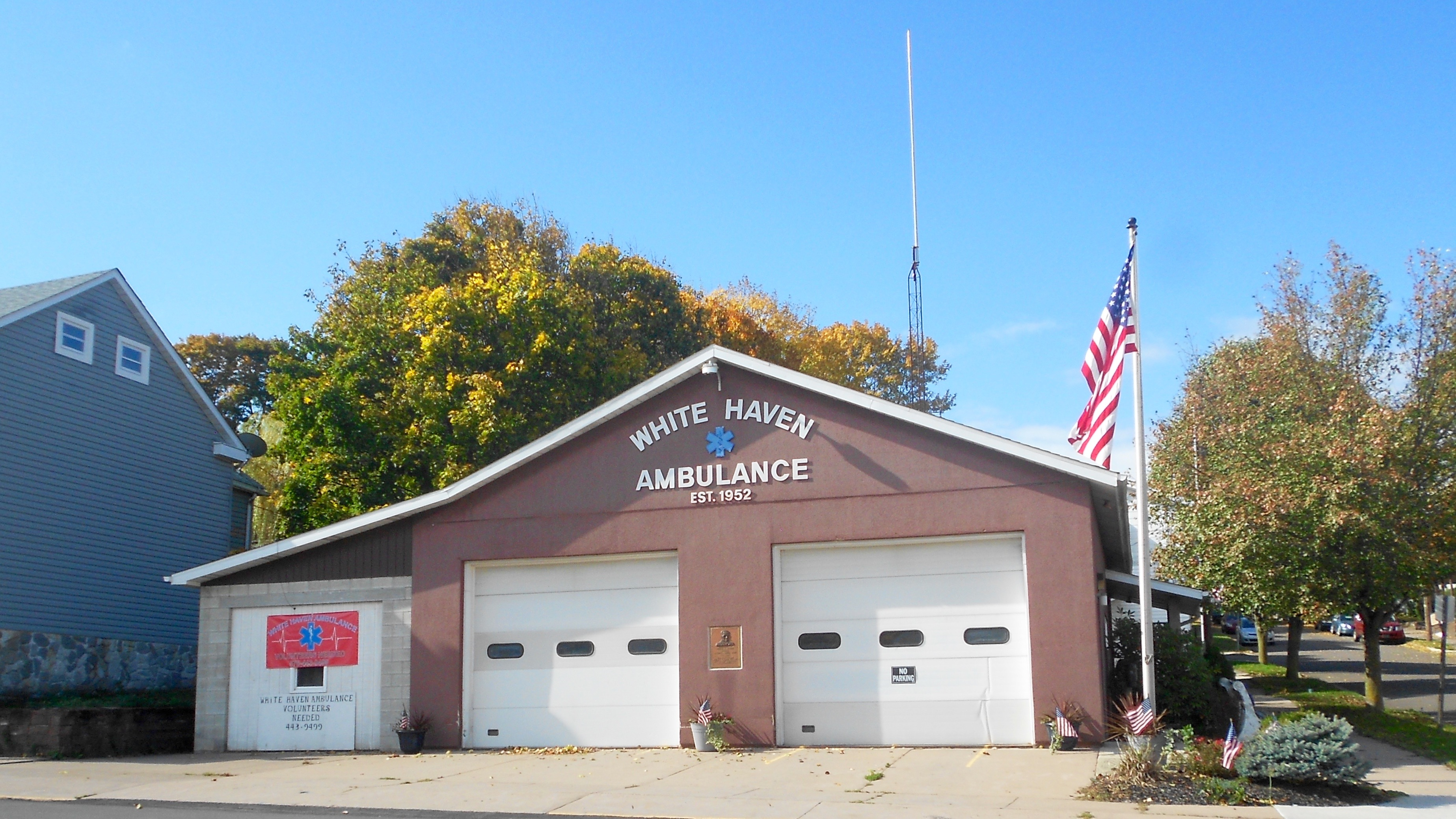
White Haven Ambulance

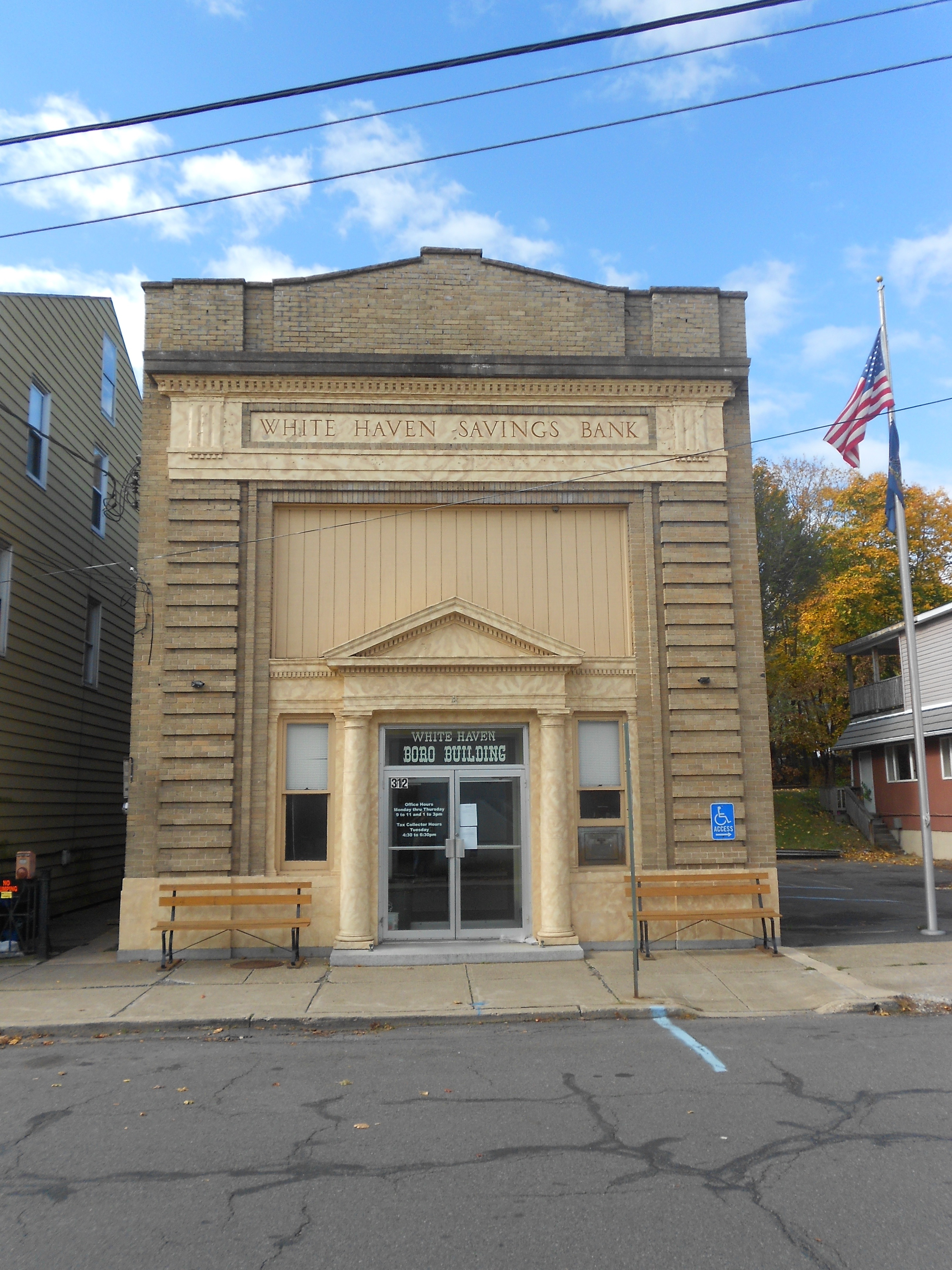
White Haven Boro Building

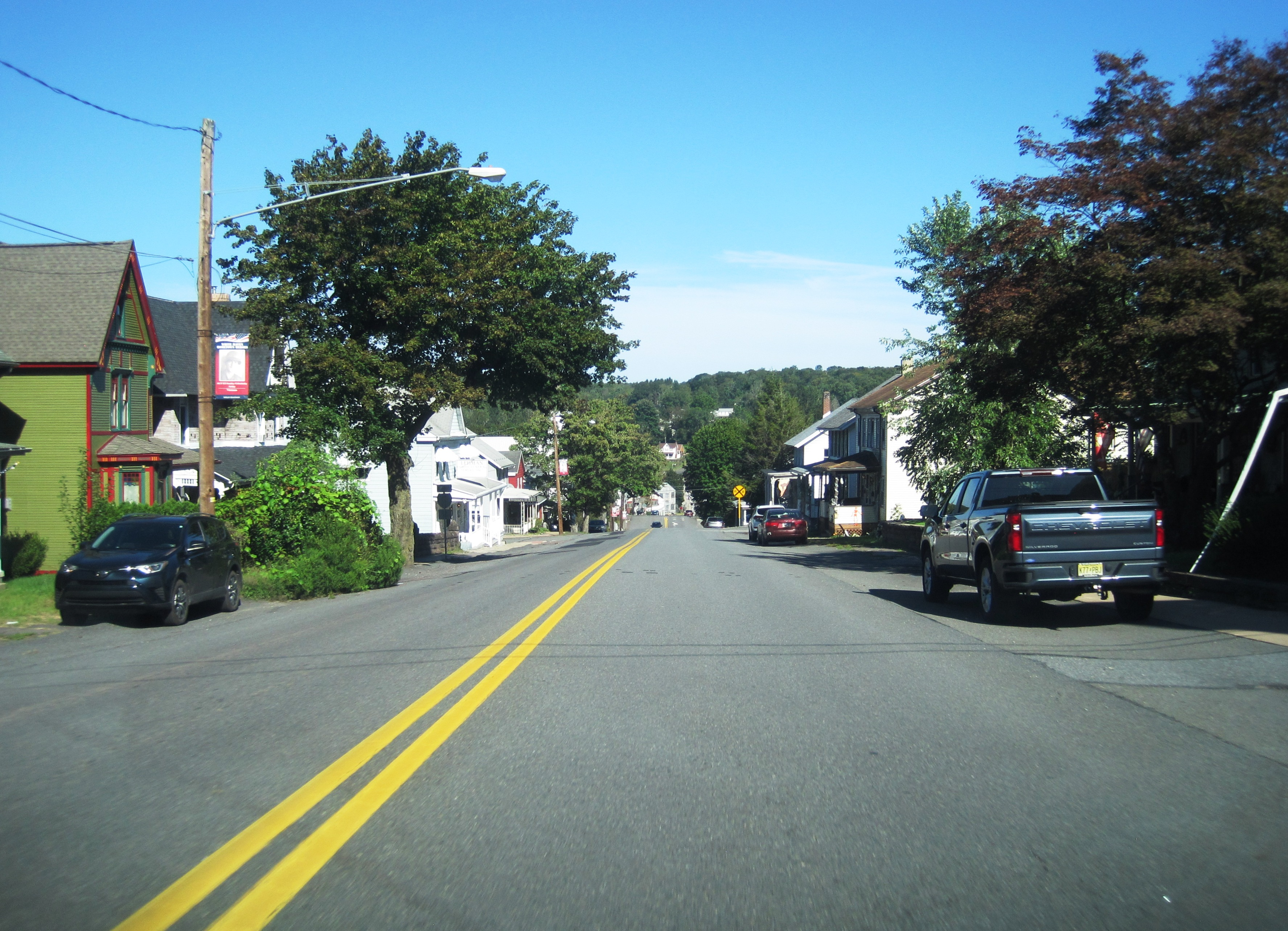
PA 940 in White Haven

== Recreation ==
Lehigh Gorge State Park, which encompasses the Lehigh River, provides White Haven and the surrounding communities with a plethora of recreational activities. Water released from the Francis E. Walter Dam makes the river deep enough for boating. White water rafting is a very popular recreational activity in the park. Other activities include fishing, hiking, bicycling, sight-seeing, snowmobiling, and much more.

== Demographics ==
Historical population
Census	Pop.	Note	%±
1860	943		—
1870	1,321		40.1%
1880	1,408		6.6%
1890	1,634		16.1%
1900	1,517		−7.2%
1910	1,438		−5.2%
1920	1,402		−2.5%
1930	1,537		9.6%
1940	1,528		−0.6%
1950	1,461		−4.4%
1960	1,778		21.7%
1970	1,203		−32.3%
1980	1,218		1.2%
1990	1,132		−7.1%
2000	1,182		4.4%
2010	1,097		−7.2%
2020	1,166		6.3%
2021 (est.)	1,164	▼	−0.2%
U.S. Decennial Census

As of the census of 2000, there were 1,182 people, 468 households, and 329 families residing in the borough. The population density was 982.1 inhabitants per square mile (379.2/km^{2}). There were 515 housing units at an average density of 427.9 per square mile (165.2/km^{2}). The racial makeup of the borough was 98.39% White, 0.08% Native American, 1.27% Asian, and 0.25% from two or more races. Hispanic or Latino of any race were 0.76% of the population.

The main ancestries reported by White Haven residents on the 2000 Census were Polish, with 17% of the population, Italian with 13%, Irish with 10%, Slovak with 8%, and German with 6%. However, Czechoslovak, Carpatho Rusyn, Eastern European and Slavic were all reported by about one percent of the population, so the Slovak population might have come in second to Polish if the census had allowed reporting of more than two ancestries.

There were 468 households, out of which 34.0% had children under the age of 18 living with them, 52.6% were married couples living together, 12.8% had a female householder with no husband present, and 29.5% were non-families. 26.5% of all households were made up of individuals, and 14.1% had someone living alone who was 65 years of age or older. The average household size was 2.53 and the average family size was 3.06.

In the borough the population was spread out, with 27.3% under the age of 18, 7.3% from 18 to 24, 28.0% from 25 to 44, 20.9% from 45 to 64, and 16.5% who were 65 years of age or older. The median age was 37 years. For every 100 females there were 87.3 males. For every 100 females age 18 and over, there were 88.8 males.

The median income for a household in the borough was $37,438, and the median income for a family was $43,846. Males had a median income of $32,159 versus $27,386 for females. The per capita income for the borough was $18,768. About 4.5% of families and 6.4% of the population were below the poverty line, including 8.3% of those under age 18 and 8.8% of those age 65 or over.

== Education ==
The school district is the Crestwood School District.

== Notable people ==
- Evelyn Colon, a formerly unidentified murder victim found in White Haven in 1976 and identified in 2021
- John J. Dempsey, governor of New Mexico
- Warren Newton Dusenberry, educator
- Liz Lemon, fictional character played by Tina Fey on the NBC comedy 30 Rock
- Edith King, actress
- Brad Kocher, Major League Baseball catcher
- Ron Mrozinski, Major League Baseball pitcher
- A. Mitchell Palmer, Attorney General in the cabinet of Woodrow Wilson
- Darin Young, professional darts player

== See also ==
- Lehigh Valley Railroad Engine House, White Haven

== Sources ==
- History of Luzerne, Lackawanna and Wyoming Counties, Pa. New York: W.W. Munsell. 1880. OCLC 318371384.
- Saylor, Roger B. (1964). The Railroads of Pennsylvania. State College, Pennsylvania: Bureau of Business Research, College of Business Administration, Pennsylvania State University. OCLC 1032849.
- Tanner, Henry Schenck (1840). A Description of the Canals and Rail Roads of the United States. New York: T.R. Tanner & J. Disturnell. OCLC 7361038.
