= Railway accident near Halfweg (1972) =

Railway incident in the Netherlands

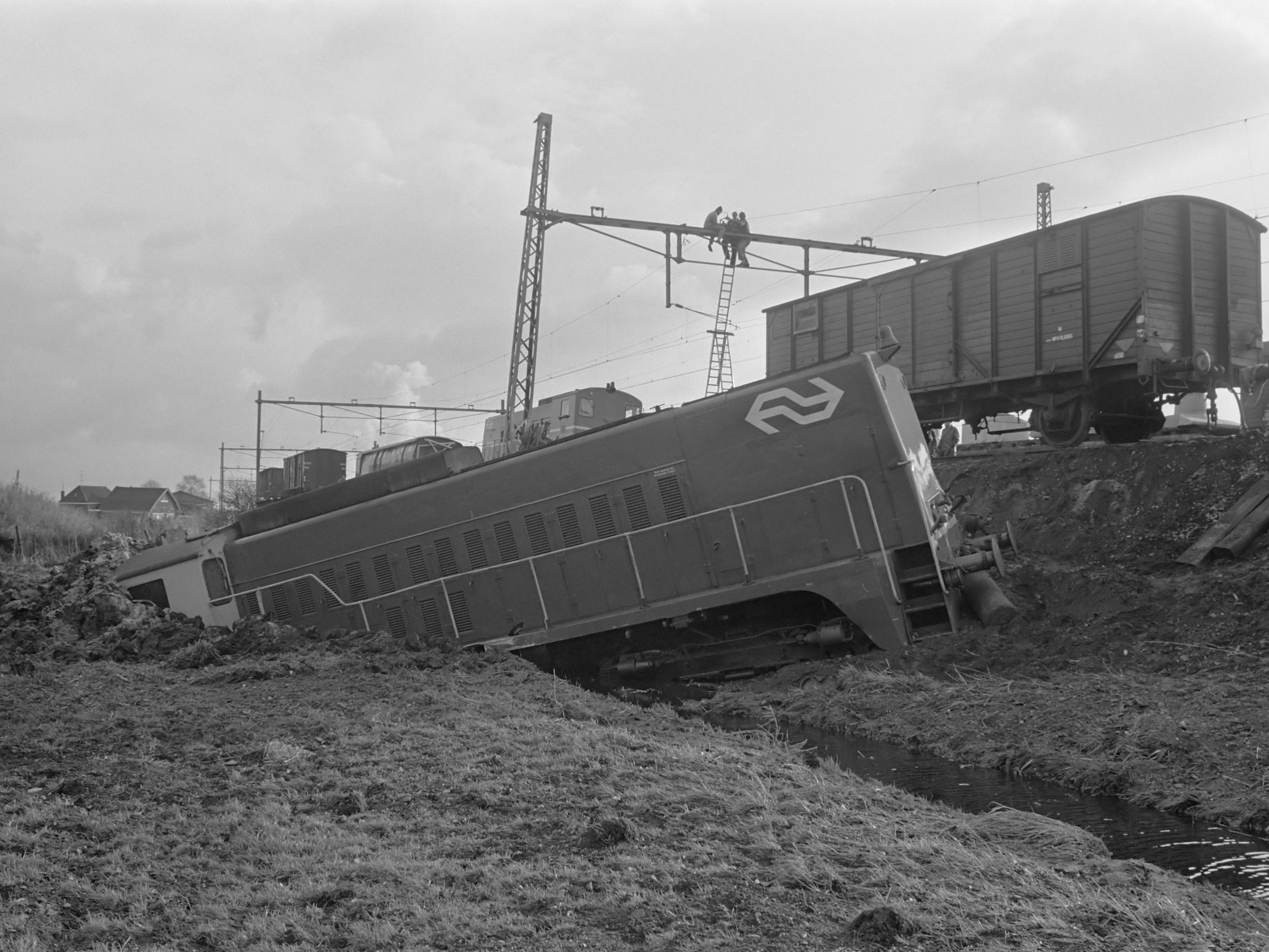
Derailment near Halfweg

At the Railway accident near Halfweg on 22 November 1972, the locomotive of a work train derailed near Halfweg in North Holland.

== History ==
On 22 November 1972 derailed diesel locomotive No. 2279 (class 2201-2350), which hauled a work train near Halfweg. After the derailment it came in the mud beside the embankment to a standstill. It had to be wrecked in situ. Although the locomotive had just been refurbished in the Tilburg workshops, it could not be salvaged from the accident site, which was very muddy being a combination of peat and swamp. The longer the locomotive was left there, the more it sank into the muddy soil. One bogie had to be left embedded in the mud.

== See also ==
- Media related to Halfweg rail accident on 22 November 1972 at Wikimedia Commons
- Railway accident near Halfweg (1966)
