= 1976 Beckemeyer train accident =

Train crashes into truck killing 12 people in Beckemeyer, Illinois

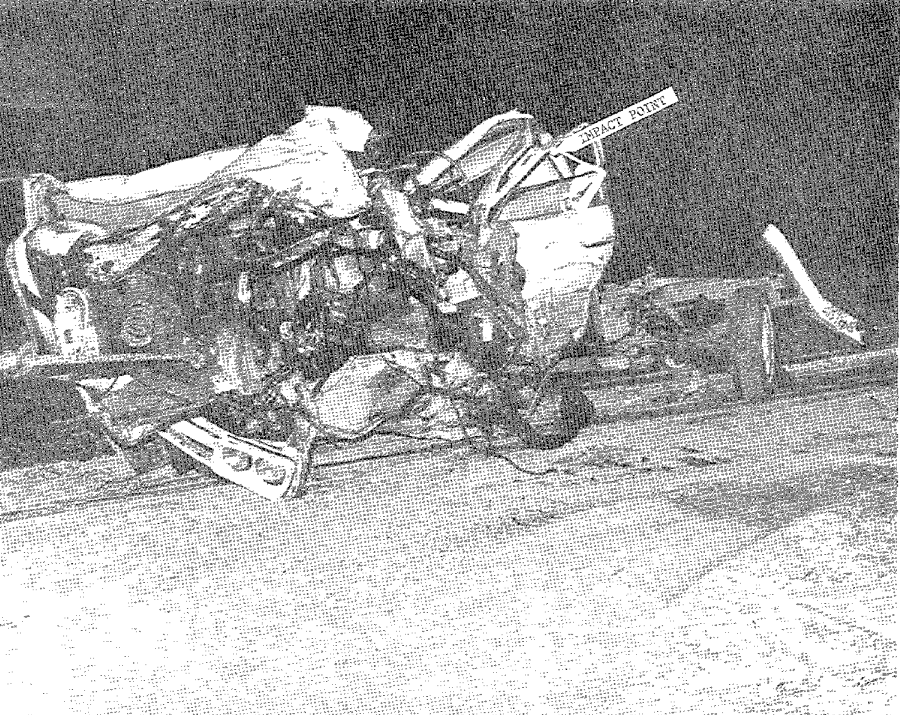
- Truck destroyed after collision

Details
- Date: February 7, 1976; 50 years ago 6:50 PM local time
- Location: Beckemeyer, Clinton County, Illinois
- Coordinates: 38.6064°N 89.4313°W
- Country: United States
- Line: Ohio & Mississippi
- Operator: Baltimore and Ohio Railroad
- Incident type: Vehicle collision
- Cause: Driver error

Statistics
- Trains: 1
- Vehicles: 1
- Crew: 3
- Deaths: 12
- Injured: 4

The 1976 Beckemeyer crossing accident occurred on February 7, 1976, and was a collision between a pickup truck and a train in the town of Beckemeyer, Illinois. The train crash killed 12 people, including 11 children, and injured three others. The disaster was the worst in the history of Clinton County.

== Accident ==
On 7 February 1976, a freight train traveling on the Baltimore and Ohio Railroad from Washington, Indiana to East St. Louis, Illinois departed. The train was 67 cars long and consisted of 36 empty freight cars, 31 loaded freight cars, and three diesel locomotives. The train had three crew members, two in the locomotive and one in the caboose. At 6:45 p.m. the freight train was approaching the small town of Beckemeyer, Illinois.

At the same time 60-year-old Henry Lowe was driving his 1967 GMC pickup truck bringing 15 people, mostly children, to a roller skating party in Highland, Illinois. Six individuals were in the cab of the truck and another 10 were in the bed. Lowe was traveling to the west on Beckemeyer Street going between 15 and 18 mph (24 and 29 km/h) . The truck turned left onto Scoville Street and continued south towards the railroad tracks without changing speed. At 6:50 p.m. the train struck the truck going 56 mph (90 km/h).

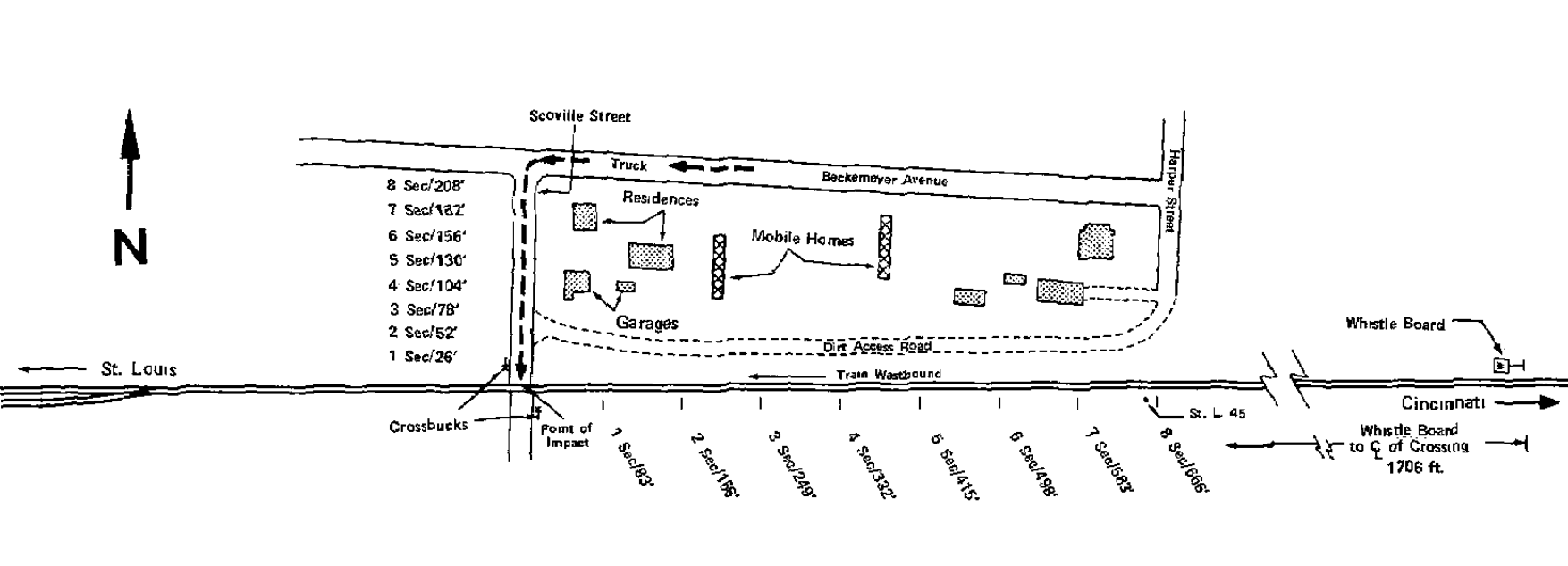
Map of train-truck collision, Beckemeyer, IL. 7 February 1976

As soon as the train hit the truck the engineer of the train, O.J. Coers threw on the emergency braking system in an attempt to stop the train. The front coupler of the train hit the truck near the driver's side door and ripped the body off the truck and threw it to the right of the train. The train continued down the tracks for another 2,500 feet (760 meters) before stopping with the truck's cab and chassis still wrapped around the front of the train.

Six of those killed were found north of the impact site after being thrown from the truck, another six were carried with the truck, and only four were found inside the cab. The injured from the train crash were quickly taken to St. Joseph's Hospital in Breese, Illinois by bystanders. The crash completely destroyed the truck and killed 11 children and Lowe himself. Three people were left with serious injuries and only one person survived without serious injury. The crash was the worst single disaster in Clinton County's history.

== Investigation ==
On 8 February 1976, a two-man team from the National Transportation Safety Board arrived at the scene of the disaster and began an investigation. A report was made seven months later, which found that mechanical malfunction was not at fault for the disaster and neither was the train engineer. Rather it concluded that the accident was likely caused by driver error. Lowe was not intoxicated and did not have a history of hearing or eyesight problems, so the most likely conclusion is that he was distracted at the time of the collision. The NTSB recommended that a signal system be added to the crossing.

== Aftermath ==
Over 1,400 people attended the funeral of Lowe and his grandchildren who were killed in the crash. The funeral was held in Carlyle High School gymnasium. The funeral procession to the three different cemeteries was over 200 cars long. Citizens of the Beckemeyer petitioned the Illinois Commerce Commission to install lights at the crossing after the disaster.
