= Lehigh Valley Railroad Engine House, White Haven =

Coordinates: 41.06797°N 75.77358°W

The Lehigh Valley Railroad Engine House is a former railroad repair shop at 99 Towanda Street, White Haven, Pennsylvania. It was built in 1889 as a more permanent structure for the repair shop belonging to the Lehigh Valley Railroad, and now serves as a community library.

== History ==
This White Haven engine house was damaged by a train derailment in 1973 and was repaired with concrete blocks and mortar. In 2002, responding to citizen demands, the borough purchased the engine house from its private owner.

It now serves the community as the community library.
