= 1971 in rail transport =

This article lists events related to rail transport that occurred in 1971.

== Events ==
=== April ===
- April 18 – Serious fire at Kentish Town West railway station in London; it remains closed until 5 October 1981.
- April 20 – In Tokyo, Japan, the Chiyoda Line is extended from Kita-senju to Ayase.
- April 30 – On the eve of Amtrak's assumption of American passenger train operations, Union Pacific Railroad and Chicago and North Western Railway end the City of Los Angeles and City of Denver trains, and the United States Post Office Department cancels all but one of the eight remaining Railway Mail Service routes; the final route served Washington, D.C., to New York City.

=== May ===
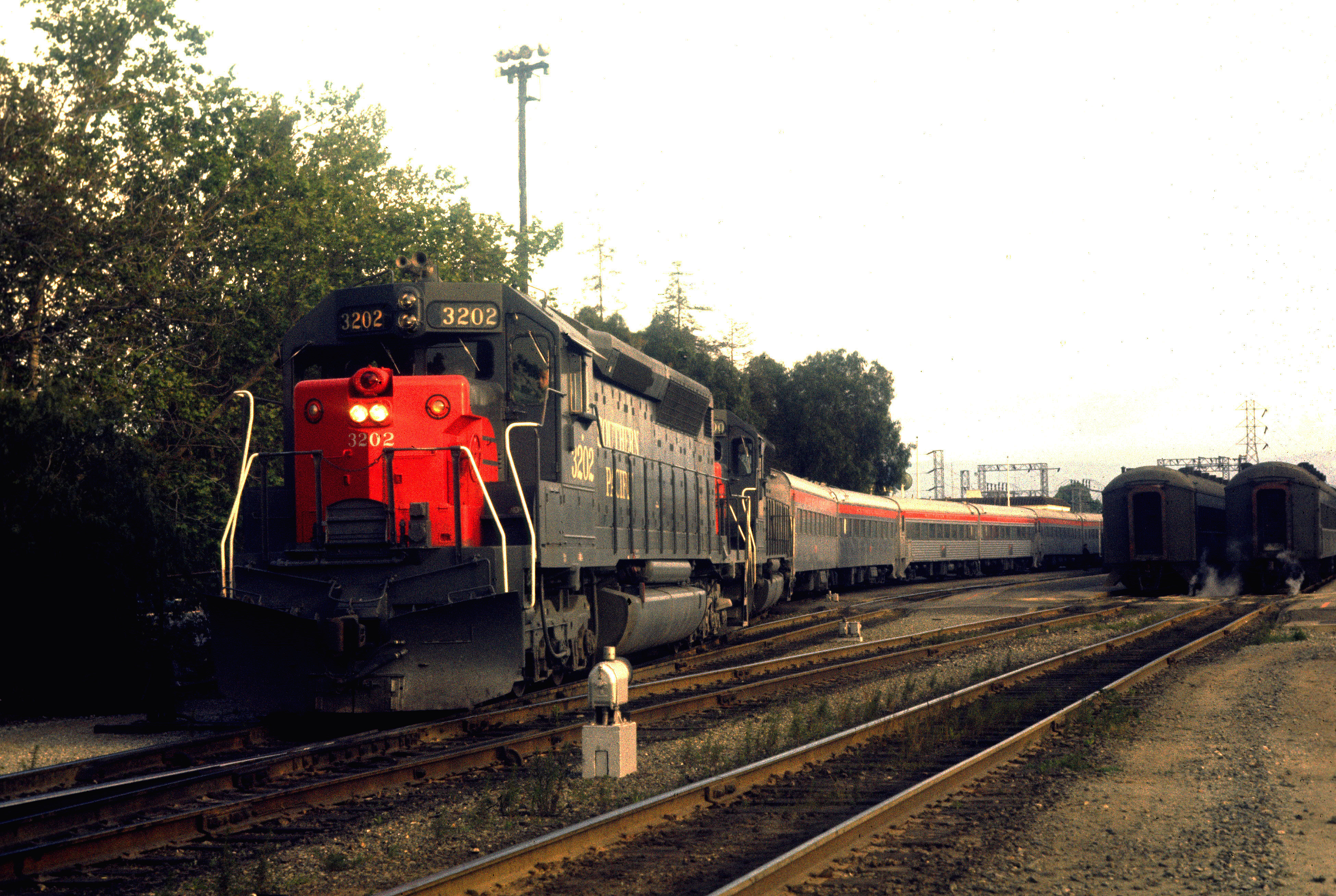
The first northbound Coast Daylight under Amtrak at San Jose, California on May 1, 1971

- May 1 – Amtrak begins operations of most intercity passenger train service in the United States.
- May 4 – The Bucharest Transport Enterprise (Întreprinderea de Transport București) puts in operation the first of the V3A trams, which later became the basis of the Bucharest Articulated Tramcar series.

=== June ===
- June 5 – Amtrak begins operating a section of the Empire Builder over the ex-Northern Pacific Railway mainline between Minneapolis and Spokane, Washington, restoring service to that route. This train will later be known as the North Coast Hiawatha.
- June 6 – London Transport commemorates the end of operating steam locomotives with a special run from Moorgate to Neasden depot of a train comprising No. L94 (ex-GWR 5700 Class No. 7752) and a selection of maintenance rolling stock.

=== July ===
- July 1 – The Shonan Monorail is extended from Nishi-Kamakura to Shōnan-Enoshima Station in Kanagawa Prefecture, Japan.
- July 23 – Opening of the final section of London Underground's Victoria line, from Victoria to Brixton, by Princess Alexandra.
- July 24 – The last regularly steam-hauled passenger train in New South Wales.
- July 30 – Opening of Pfaffenberg-Zwenberg Bridge on Tauern Railway Line in Austria, the world's longest concrete arch, with a span of 200 m (660 ft).
- July 31 – The Monon Railroad is merged into the Louisville and Nashville Railroad.

=== September ===
- September 1 – MBTA Red Line South Shore branch opens to Quincy Center
- September 10 – British Columbia Premier W. A. C. Bennett leads the ceremony to open the Pacific Great Eastern Railway's Fort Nelson Subdivision between Fort St. John and Fort Nelson, British Columbia.
- September 26 – Deutsche Bundesbahn introduces Inter-City express train network in Germany.

=== October ===
- October 2 – Preserved ex-Great Western Railway steam locomotive No. 6000 King George V inaugurates a series of special trains on British Rail, the first steam allowed on the main line for several years.
- October 26 – Last train worked by steam on New Zealand Railways, the South Island Limited, hauled by J^{A} class.

=== November ===
- November – Construction begins on the Tōhoku Shinkansen line in Japan.

=== December ===
- December 6 – The first Auto Train operates under the control of the Auto-Train Corporation.
- December 16 – The first section of Sapporo Municipal Subway, connecting from Kita-nijuyo-jo Station, via Sapporo Station to Makomanai Station route officially opens in Hokkaido, before 1972 Winter Olympics.

=== Unknown date ===
- United States Federal Railroad Administration opens High Speed Ground Test Center (later the Transportation Technology Center) in Pueblo, Colorado.
- Construction begins on the Jōetsu Shinkansen line from Tokyo to Niigata, Japan.

== Accidents ==
=== February accidents ===
- February 9 – A Zürich-bound TEE train derails at Aitrang, Germany, due to excess speed and is hit by a railbus. 28 die and 42 are injured.

=== March accidents ===
- March 4 – A local train collides with a mini truck at a level crossing on the Fujikyu line, Fujiyoshida, Yamanashi, Japan, killing at least 179 people and injuring 6100.
- March 11 – A runaway train carrying 350 passengers, mostly children, derails next to a 12-metre-deep (39 ft) ravine near Vicuña, Chile, killing twelve people.

=== May accidents ===
- May 27 – Dahlerau train disaster: A special train full of schoolchildren collides with a freight train in Dahlerau, West Germany, on the line between Wuppertal and Radevormwald due to a misunderstanding of signals. 46 die and 25 are injured, making this the worst rail accident in West Germany during Deutsche Bundesbahn times.

=== June accidents ===
- June 10 – Salem, Illinois derailment: a flat spot on a locomotive wheel causes Amtrak's City of New Orleans to derail near Salem, Illinois. Six passengers are killed. It is Amtrak's first fatal accident since beginning operations on May 1.

=== July accidents ===
- July 21 – A fast train from Basel to Copenhagen derails due to a technical failure in the Class 103 engine; 23 die and 121 are injured.

== Deaths ==
=== August deaths ===
- August 30 – Louis Armand, French railway engineer, manager and resistance fighter (born 1905)
