= SBB RAm TEE I and NS DE4 =

Class of 5 Dutch/Swiss 4-car diesel multiple units

SBB RAm TEE ^{I} NS DE4
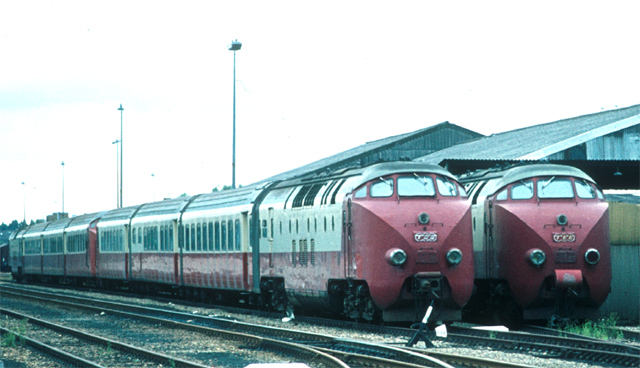
- The trainsets stored at Utrecht in 1975
- In service: Europe: 1957–1977; Canada: 1979–1992
- Manufacturers: Powercars: Werkspoor; Trailers: SIG
- Constructed: 1957
- Number built: 5 sets
- Number preserved: 5 trailers
- Formation: 4 cars per set
- Fleet numbers: NS: 1001–1003; SBB: 501–502
- Capacity: 114 first class

Specifications
- Train length: 98.06 m (321 ft 8 5/8 in)
- Width: 3.00 m (9 ft 10 1/8 in)
- Height: 4.21 m (13 ft 9 3/4 in)
- Maximum speed: 140 km/h (87 mph)
- Weight: 228.8 tonnes (225.2 long tons; 252.2 short tons)
- Prime mover: RUHB 1616, 2 off
- Power output: 1,000 CV (740 kW; 990 hp) × 2
- Transmission: Diesel-electric
- UIC classification: (A1A)(A1A)+2′2′+2′2′+2′2′
- Braking system: Knorr
- Coupling system: Scharfenberg
- Track gauge: 1,435 mm (4 ft 8 1/2 in) standard gauge

The SBB RAm TEE ^{I} and NS DE4 were a class of five 4-car diesel-electric trainsets ordered for Trans Europe Express (TEE) service. Two were ordered by the Swiss Federal Railways (SBB) and three by Nederlandse Spoorwegen (NS)

== History ==
In planning the launch of the TEE services, it was decided to use diesel-powered fixed sets for the new trains. While the French and the Italians refined existing designs, the Germans introduced a new design, the VT 11.5. The Swiss and Dutch railways cooperated on a joint development for a new 4-car diesel-electric trainset.

The design comprised:

- A power car with compartments for luggage, customs and the train conductor.
- A nine-compartment trailer car (54 seats)
- A kitchen-restaurant trailer car with a 32-seat dining section, and an 18-seat first-class open saloon
- A driving trailer car with 42-seat open saloon, and a staff sleeping compartment.

All 114 seats were first class, with 2+1 seating in the saloons, and 2+2 in the dining section.

The power cars were built by Werkspoor, with electrics by Brown, Boveri & Cie; they were powered by a pair of RUHB 1,000-metric-horsepower (740 kW; 990 hp) diesel engines. A third diesel engine of 300 metric horsepower (220 kW; 300 hp) provided power for heating, lighting, air-conditioning and the kitchen in the dining car.

The trailer cars were built by Schweizerische Industrie Gesellschaft (SIG); the design was based on the SBB's standard carriage design (Einheitswagen I) due to the short time available for design and construction. Only one entrance vestibule was provided at the front end of the cars, doors were of the folding aluminum type, and windows were double-glazed with a passenger-operated venetian blinds between the panes.

The sets were equipped with Scharfenberg couplers, and were geared for a maximum speed of 140 km/h (87 mph).

They were painted in the TEE colours of dark red (RAL 3004 purpurrot) and cream (RAL 1001 beige). Ownership of the sets was down-played in favour of the service – the restaurant cars having TRANS EUROPE EXPRESS lettering above the windows, while the owner (SBB or NS) and fleet number were only marked by small lettering on the power cars

== Service ==
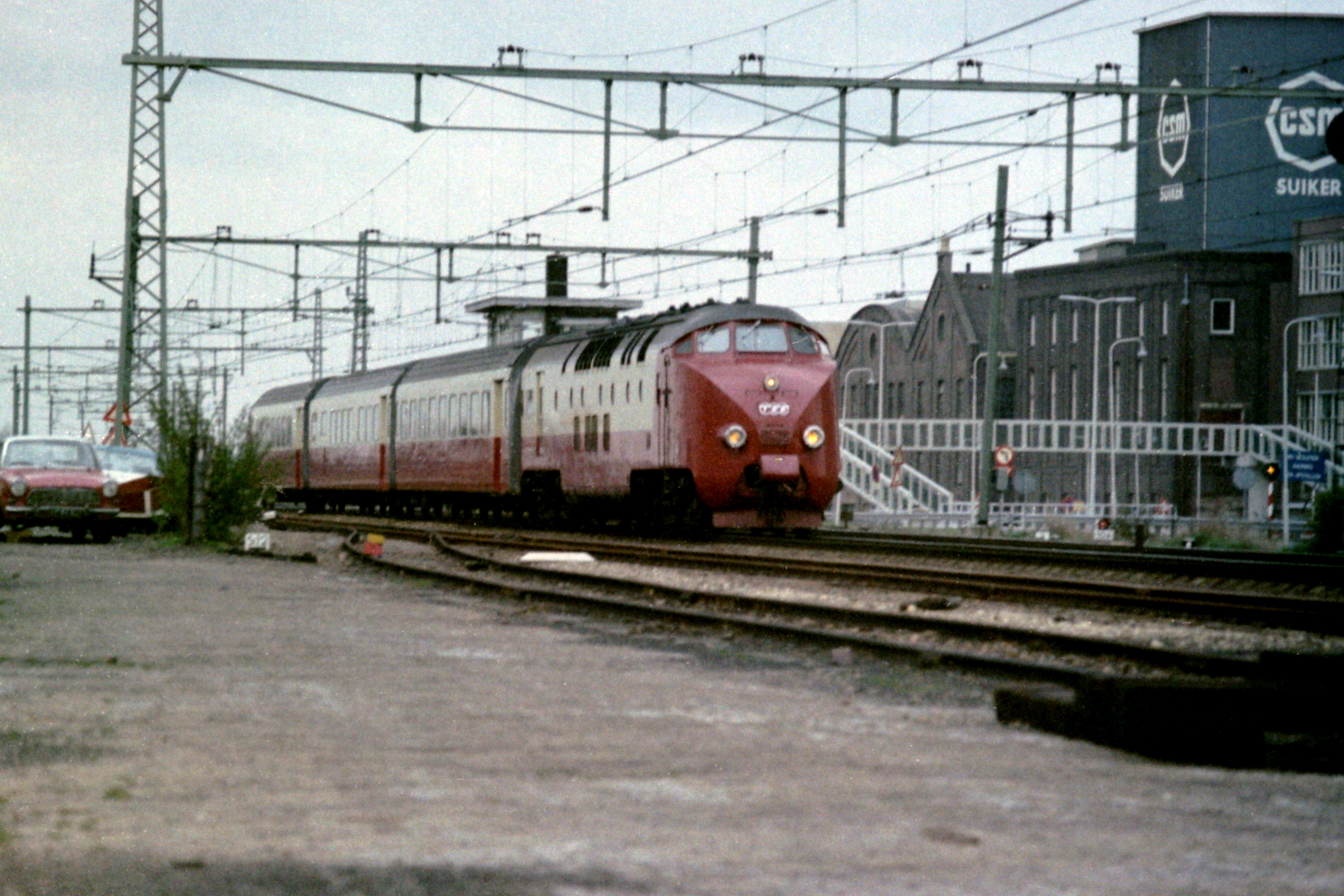
One of the sets on the Edelweiss at Halfweg-Zwanenburg

From 2 June 1957 to 30 May 1964 the five sets were used in a 3,532-kilometre (2,195 mi) four-day service pool as follows:

- Day 1:
  - TEE 30 Edelweiss — Zürich HB – Basel SBB – Strasbourg – Luxembourg – Brussels-Nord – Amsterdam CS
- Day 2
  - TEE 128 L'Étoile du Nord — Amsterdam CS – Paris-Nord
  - TEE 145 L'Oiseau Bleu — Paris-Nord – Brussels-Midi
- Day 3
  - TEE 108 L'Oiseau Bleu — Bruxelles-Midi – Paris-Nord
  - TEE 125 L'Étoile du Nord — Paris-Nord – Amsterdam CS
- Day 4
  - TEE 31 Edelweiss : Amsterdam CS – Zürich HB
- Day 5
  - Maintenance layover in Zürich

One curious feature of this pool was the use of Swiss-Dutch stock on a Franco-Belgian route. When a RAm/DE4 set was unavailable, an SNCF locomotive with a set of DEV Inox coaches was substituted.

From 31 May 1964, the L'Oiseau Bleu went to permanently locomotive-hauled Inox coaches, whereupon the service pool became:

- Day 1:
  - TEE 30 Edelweiss — Zürich HB – Amsterdam CS
- Day 2
  - TEE 122 L'Étoile du Nord — Amsterdam CS – Paris-Nord
  - TEE 125 L'Étoile du Nord — Paris-Nord – Amsterdam CS
- Day 3
  - TEE 31 Edelweiss : Amsterdam CS – Zürich HB

The spare and maintenance sets were stationed ant Zürich and Amsterdam.

From 2 August 1964 L'Étoile du Nord also went loco-hauled; the service pool changing to a 3,048-kilometre (1,894 mi) three-day circuit:

- Day 1:
  - TEE 30 Edelweiss — Zürich HB – Amsterdam CS
- Day 2:
  - TEE 31 Edelweiss : Amsterdam CS – Zürich HB
- Day 3
  - TEE 8 L'Arbalète — Zürich HB – Paris-Est
  - TEE 9 L'Arbalète — Paris-Est – Zürich HB

This lasted until 28 September 1969, L'Arbalète became locomotive-hauled Inox coaches; the filling-in turn was then changed:

- Day 1:
  - TEE 30 Edelweiss — Zürich HB – Amsterdam CS
- Day 2:
  - TEE 31 Edelweiss : Amsterdam CS – Zürich HB
- Day 3
  - TEE 57 Bavaria — Zürich HB – Munich Hbf
  - TEE 56 Bavaria — Munich Hbf – Zürich HB

This 2,524-kilometre (1,568 mi) three-day pool lasted until one trainset was written off in an accident in February 1971 (see below) whereafter the remaining 4 sets were diagrammed for use only on the Edelweiss until 24 May 1974 which was their last day in TEE service.

== Accidents and incidents ==
- In August 1961 SBB 501 caught fire, and was out of service for 176 days until January 1962.
- Aitrang derailment and collision – On 9 February 1971 SBB 501 was running as Bavaria from Munich to Zurich with 53 passengers on board. Running trailer-first on the double track Buchloe–Lindau railway, it entered an 80-kilometre-per-hour (50 mph) S-curve near Aitrang at about 125 km/h (78 mph) and derailed, fouling both lines. It was then struck by a VT98 Uerdingen railbus. Twenty-eight were killed and 42 were seriuosuly injured. Of the fatalities, 26 were in the TEE, 2 in the railbus, and included both drivers, and the German actor/director Leonard Steckel. The cause, although not known for certain, was assumed to be brake failure, possible caused by condensation freezing in the air-brake lines. The three trailers were scrapped on site; the power car was taken to Tilburg works, but was later condemned and scrapped.

== End of TEE service ==
As from 26 May 1974, TEE discontinued the use of diesel trainsets on all its services. The three Dutch sets were stored at Utrecht and the surviving Swiss set at Zurich-Wollishofen station pending sale. A plan by NS to convert them to electric operation came to nothing. In 1977, all four were sold to the Ontario Northland Railway (ONT) of Canada.

== Northlander ==
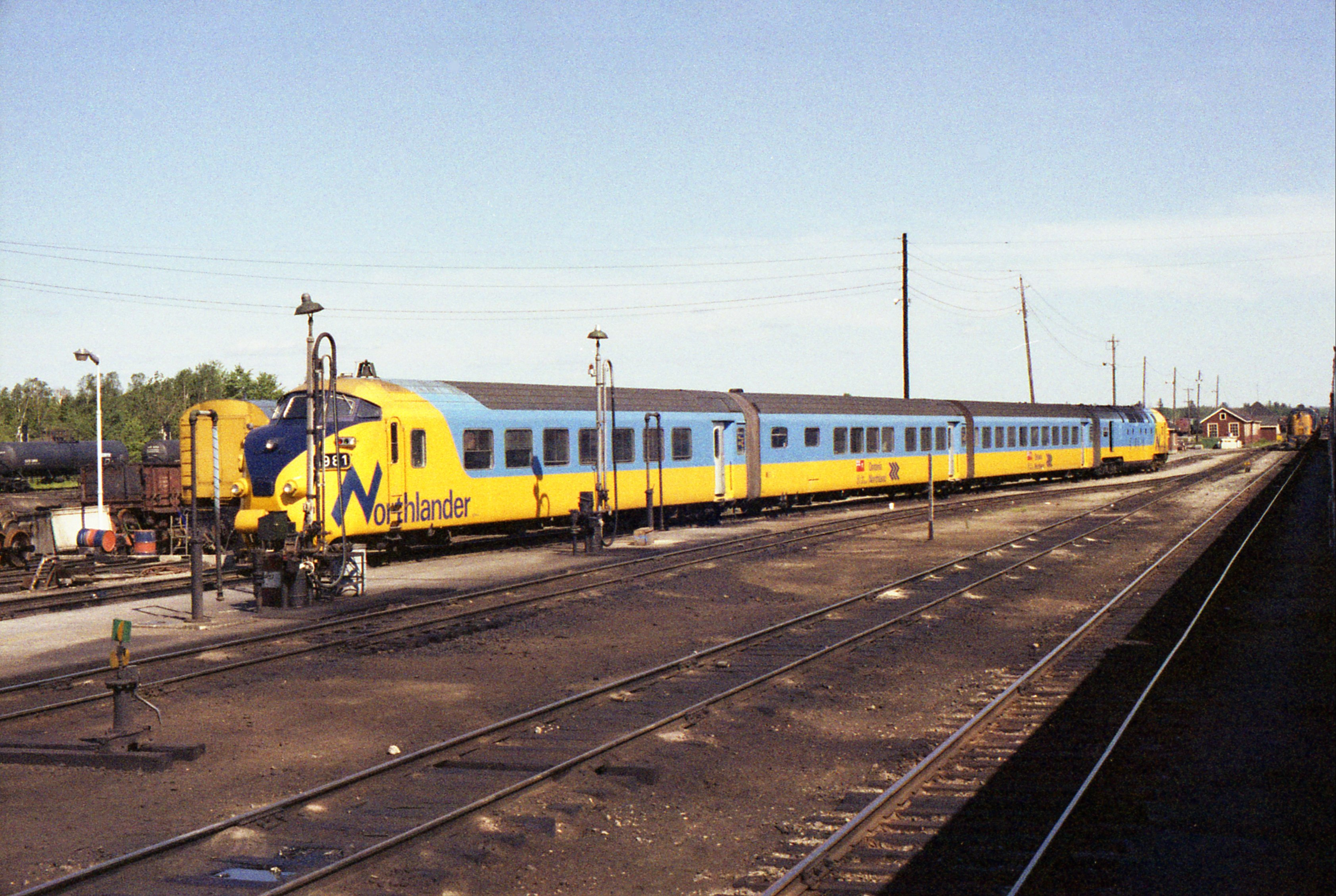
One of the sets in Canada, May 1978

The four trainsets were shipped to Canada, and after being modified to make them compliant with Canadian railway standards, they entered Ontario Northland service on the Northlander between Toronto Union Station and Timmins. ONR never used the driving trailers as they preferred the weight of the power car at the front of the train in case of hitting snow or a crossing collision

Unfortunately the power cars proved unsatisfactory – they could not cope with the harsh Canadian winters, and the maintenance crews were unfamiliar with the European equipment. In 1979 and 1980, the power cars were scrapped and replaced with modified EMD FP7 diesel locomotives. The trains continued in service until February 1992.

== Repatriation ==
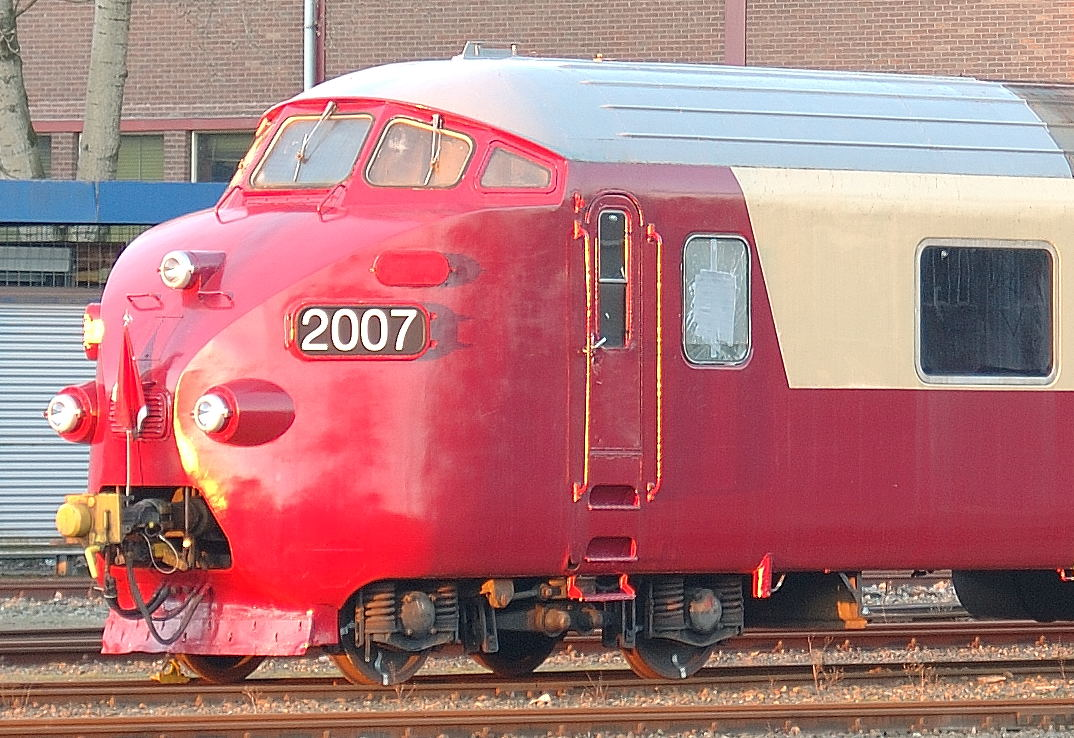
One driving trailer has been repainted into red and cream. Zwolle, February 2008

The Swiss foundation TEE Classics bought eight cars to restore a trainset to its original condition. Five cars were repatriated to Europe:

- One car of former NS 1001;
- The control car of former NS 1002;
- The three cars of the former NS 1003.

They were loaded onto the Norwegian cargo ship MV Tampa and sailed from Saint John, New Brunswick on 19 October 1998, arriving at Hamburg on 5 November. After standing in Hamburg docks for several months due to having Canadian rather than European wheel profiles, they were moved to Heilbronn. One of the driving trailers was restored and displayed at the Swiss Museum of Transport in Lucerne.

In June 2006 the TEE Netherlands Foundation brought all five cars together at Zwolle for restoration. One of the trailer cars was repainted back into the TEE red and cream livery to celebrate the 50th anniversary of the trainsets introduction. They also plan to construct a new powercar to replace the missing originals, none of which survive.

The trainset has been on the railway yard Dijksgracht in Amsterdam since 2007, waiting for repair. The intention is to use them again in the future after the restoration and rebuilding of the missing motor car. Shortly before the 50th anniversary of the Trans Europ Express (2 June 1957 – 2 June 2007) the head of one of the control cars was repainted in the old red TEE color.

On 23 December 2020, the foundation announced that the carriages will be transferred to the Nederlands Transport Museum in Nieuw-Vennep where they will be restored. Ownership of the coaches was transferred on 5 January 2021. The TEE Nederland Foundation is disbanded. Funds are raised for the transport to Nieuw-Vennep and subsequent repairs.

== Models ==
Models of the RAm have been manufactured by Märklin and Roco in HO scale and by Trix in both HO scale, and (under their Minitrix brand) in N. Models of the RAm and Dutch DE trainsets were also made by LS Models and RailTop in exact 1/87 scale. A new model, fully made of metal was released by Märklin and Trix in 2020 as an insider model.
