= SIG Group =

Swiss packaging and mechanical engineering company

SIG Group AG
- Type: Public
- Traded as: SIX: SIGN; SMI MID component
- Predecessor: SIG Holding AG
- Founded: 1853
- Headquarters: Neuhausen am Rheinfall, Canton of Schaffhausen, Switzerland
- Key people: Mikko Keto, CEO, Ann-Kristin Erkens CFO and Ola Rollén, Chair of Board of Directors
- Products: Liquid food and beverage packaging
- Services: Aseptic cartons, bag-in-box, spouted pouch, filling equipment and service
- Revenue: €3.2 billion (2025) ▲
- Number of employees: c. 9700 (2025)
- Website: www.sig.biz

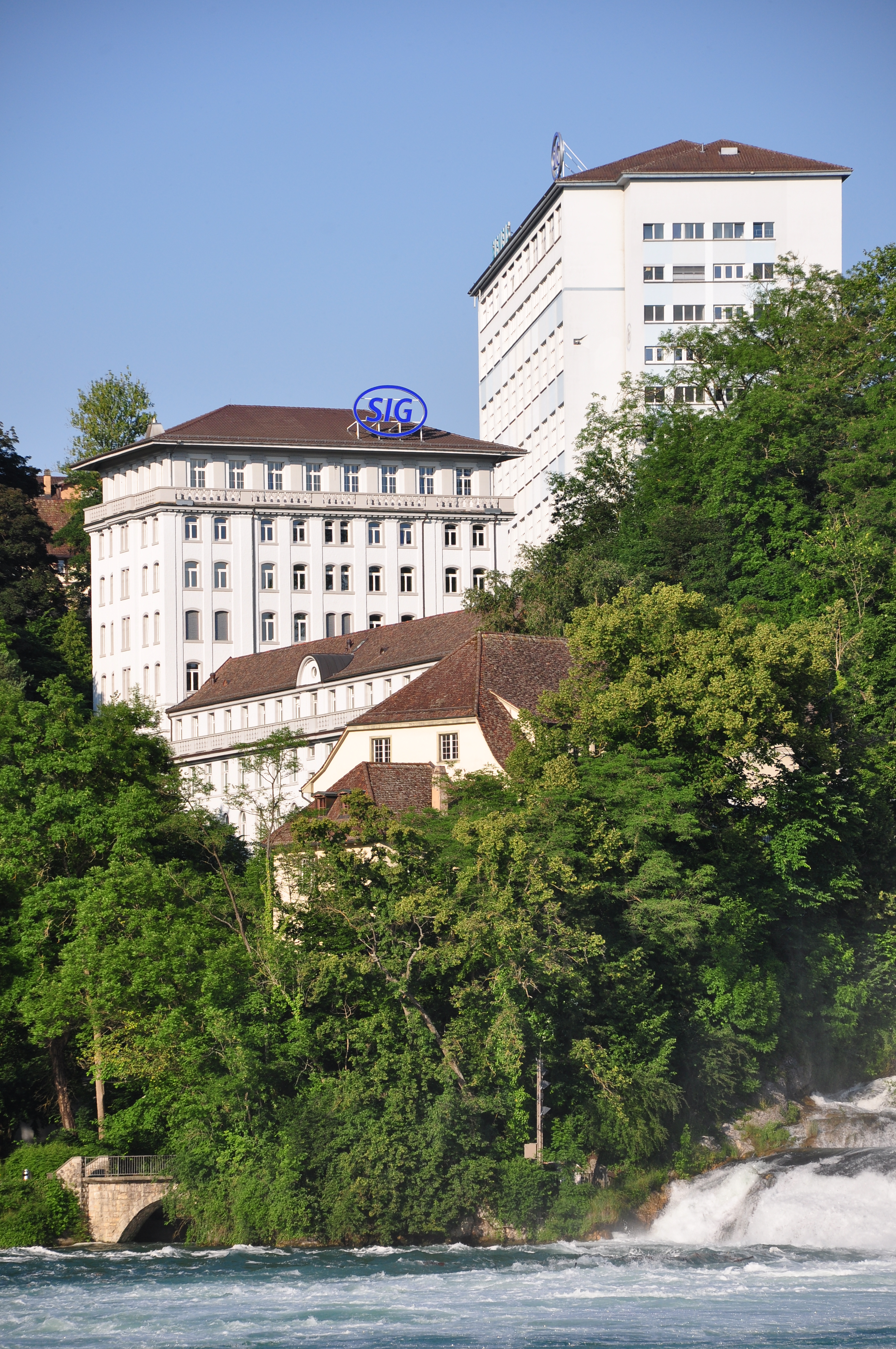
SIG buildings in Neuhausen am Rheinfall (Switzerland)

SIG Group AG is a Swiss multinational corporation and one of the biggest manufacturers in the packaging industry.

Originally founded 1853 as a railway car producer named Schweizerische Waggonfabrik ("Swiss Wagon Factory"), it was renamed SIG (Schweizerische Industrie Gesellschaft, German for Swiss Industrial Company; in French, as Société Industrielle Suisse; and, in Italian, as Società Industriale Svizzera) a decade later, after it had won a contract for the production of firearms by the Swiss government.

The SIG Group shares are listed on SIX Swiss Exchange and are a component of the SMI MID index. The industrial site at the headquarters in Neuhausen am Rheinfall is located directly on the Rhine Falls. Built at this location in 1853 for the use of hydroelectric power, the site was transferred to the SIG Charitable Foundation in 2011.

== History ==
=== Packaging (1906–today) ===
==== 1906–1950 ====
In order to address the volatility of the railway vehicle and firearms businesses, SIG started to produce packaging machinery starting from 1906 as a third main business area. The machines were produced at SIG in Neuhausen on behalf of the patentee of a "folding box" die-fold system, a co-founder of SAPAL (Société Anonyme des Plieuses Automatiques). Most of SIG's earlier packaging equipment efforts were focused on small dry food items such as chocolates and candy. The first packaging machines were delivered to Swiss chocolate manufacturers. In 1921, SIG started to construct its own packaging machines.

==== 1950–2000 ====
1956 SIG launched its first continuous flow wrapping machine. 1964 the business unit moved to Beringen where it had built a new factory. By 1981, it was producing 60 models of packaging machines.

In 1989, through the acquisition of PKL from Linnich, Germany, SIG entered the field of aseptic carton liquid packaging, later known as SIG Combibloc.

==== 2000–today ====
In 2000, SIG started to focus on food and beverage packaging technology. At that time, SIG already ranked as the second-largest manufacturer in the world, after Tetra Pak, of cardboard composites for fluids packaging. Motion control specialist SIG Positec, which was mostly successful on the German, Swiss and Italian markets, was sold to Schneider Electric in the same year for €195 million. With this, SIG divested its automation division. Management directed revenues from the sales of SIG Sauer and Rocktools to acquire global businesses, including Krupp Kunstofftechnik (Corpoplast, Blowtec, and Kautex brands) and HAMBA in Germany; Ryka Blow Molds in Canada; and a substantial portion of the Italian conglomerate SASIB. The food-related (dry) businesses were organized under the SIG Pack division, while the beverage-related (wet) businesses formed SIG Beverages. Aseptic liquid packaging remained separate under SIG Combibloc.

The former SASIB wet businesses Simonazzi, Alfa and Meyer/Mojonnier were sold to Tetra Laval in 2005, while HAMBA, Kautex and Blowtec were sold separately to private investor groups. The food packaging businesses were sold to Robert Bosch Verpackungstechnik in 2004. The former SASIB dry unit Stewart Systems (bakery products) was sold to UCA Group in 2004. Laser-guided vehicle manufacturer Elettric 80, part of the 1999 SASIB acquisition, was sold back to its original Italian owners in 2004.

By 2006, Sigpack Systems had an export ratio of 97% of its products. The slimmed-down SIG Beverages unit, manufacturer of PET bottle blow-molding machinery, was sold off to the German company Salzgitter AG in March 2008. This sale encompassed the subsidiaries Corpoplast, Asbofill, Plasmax and Moldtec.

In 2007, SIG Holding AG was acquired by Rank Group Limited, the private investment company of New Zealand businessman Graeme Hart, and operated under its subsidiary, Reynolds Group Holdings Ltd., which, in March 2015, announced completion of its sale of SIG to ONEX Corporation. In the early 2010s, SIG started to promote as a world first extra-slim small-format carton packs starting from 80ml tailored for children especially in fast-growing regions as Asia and Middle East.

Today, SIG Group focuses on aseptic packaging. In 2016, the company introduced Combibloc RS Composite, a composite structural inner layer which increases system stability and reduces the carbon footprint of carton packs. In 2017, SIG introduced the first individual QR codes with digital sourcing transparency, tailored for dairy product consumers. In 2018 the company was relisted to the SIX Swiss Exchange. In 2020 SIG Group fully integrated its Joint Venture SIG Combibloc Obeikan into SIG. The Joint Venture with a manufacturing plant in Riyadh and customers in the Middle East and Africa region had been established in 2001.

In April 2022, the company was renamed from SIG Combibloc Group AG to SIG Group AG. In the same year, SIG finalised the acquisition of Scholle IPN, an American producer of flexible food and beverages packaging including spouted pouches and bag-in-box solutions originally developed by William R. Scholle. Also in 2022, SIG acquired the Asia business of US competitor Pactiv Evergreen with its production facilities for fresh products, especially fresh milk in the People's Republic of China, Taiwan and South Korea.

=== Railways, Vehicles (1853–1995) ===
The Schweizerische Waggonfabrik ("Swiss Wagon Factory") was founded in 1853 by Friedrich Peyer im Hof, Heinrich Moser, and Johann Conrad Neher. From 1854, it produced railway cars for the emerging Swiss railway companies. Friedrich Peyer was one of the directors of the Swiss Northeastern Railway, also founded in 1853. In 1855 SIG railway carriages were honoured with an award at the World’s Fair in Paris. Their factory in Neuhausen am Rheinfall was originally powered by the nearby Rhine Falls and employed 150 workers, which by the mid-1860s increased to 500 workers.

One of the signature trains of SIG in the 1960s was the iconic Trans Europe Express (TEE). In the late 1970s, SIG was the designer and builder of Toronto's streetcar, the CLRV L1. The remaining 190 L2 vehicles, along with 52 articulated variants, were made by Thunder Bay, Ontario-based Urban Transportation Development Corporation (UTDC), now a subsidiary of Bombardier Transportation.

From around 1981, SIG focused in the railway segment on the production of bogies as part of a division of labour with other Swiss railway manufacturers such as the Schindler Group (Schindler Waggon, Schweizerische Wagons- und Aufzügefabrik AG Schlieren-Zürich) and Flug- und Fahrzeugwerke Altenrhein. These bogies can still be found in many countries today. In the early 1980s, SIG was the designer and builder of the Utrecht sneltram trams. 27 were ordered and delivered in 1983. Their scheduled replacements ran from 2017 to 2020.

The tilting system of the SBB RABDe 500 was developed by SIG. The railway branch of SIG was sold in 1995 to Fiat Ferroviaria.

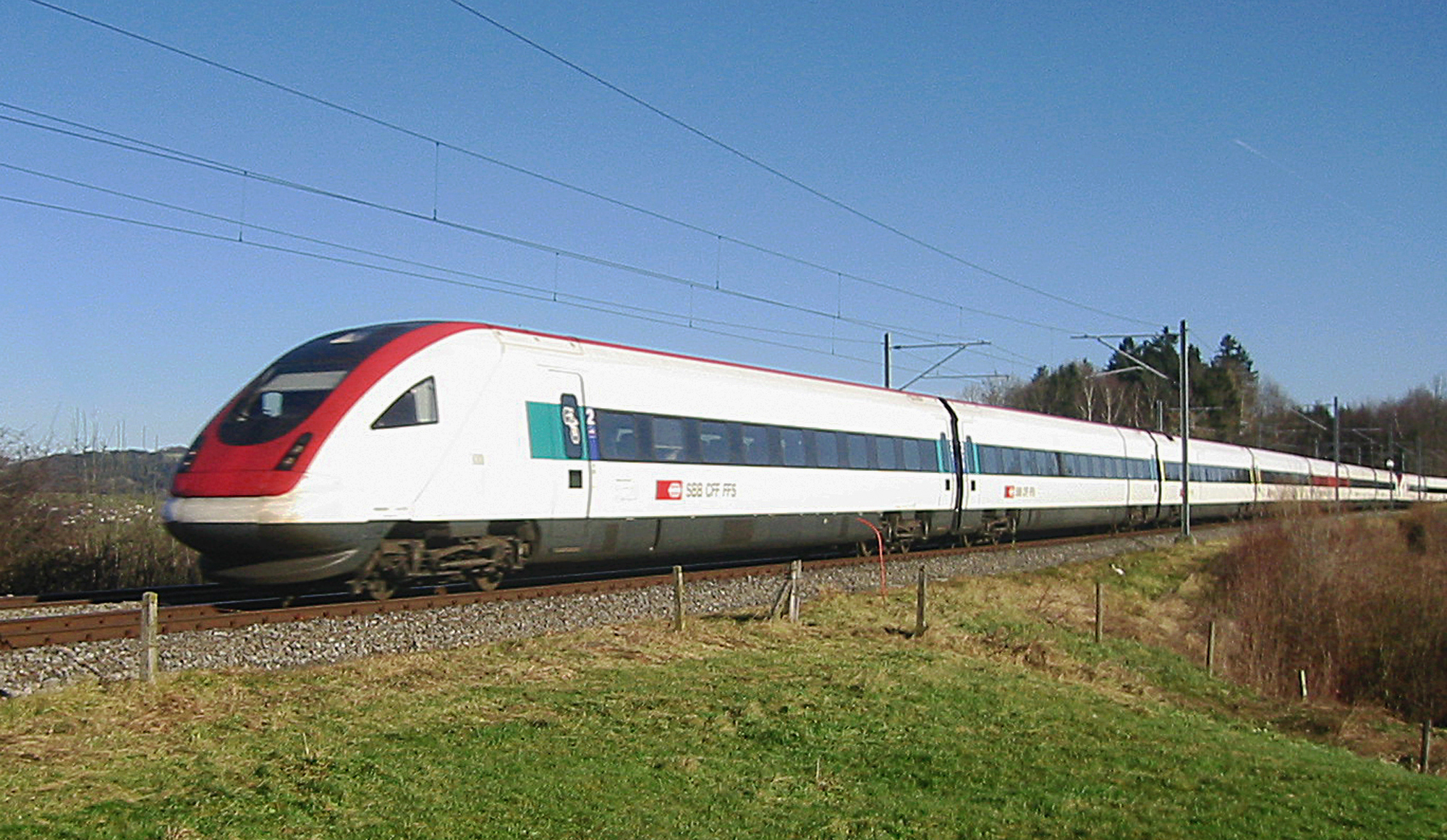
SBB RABDe 500

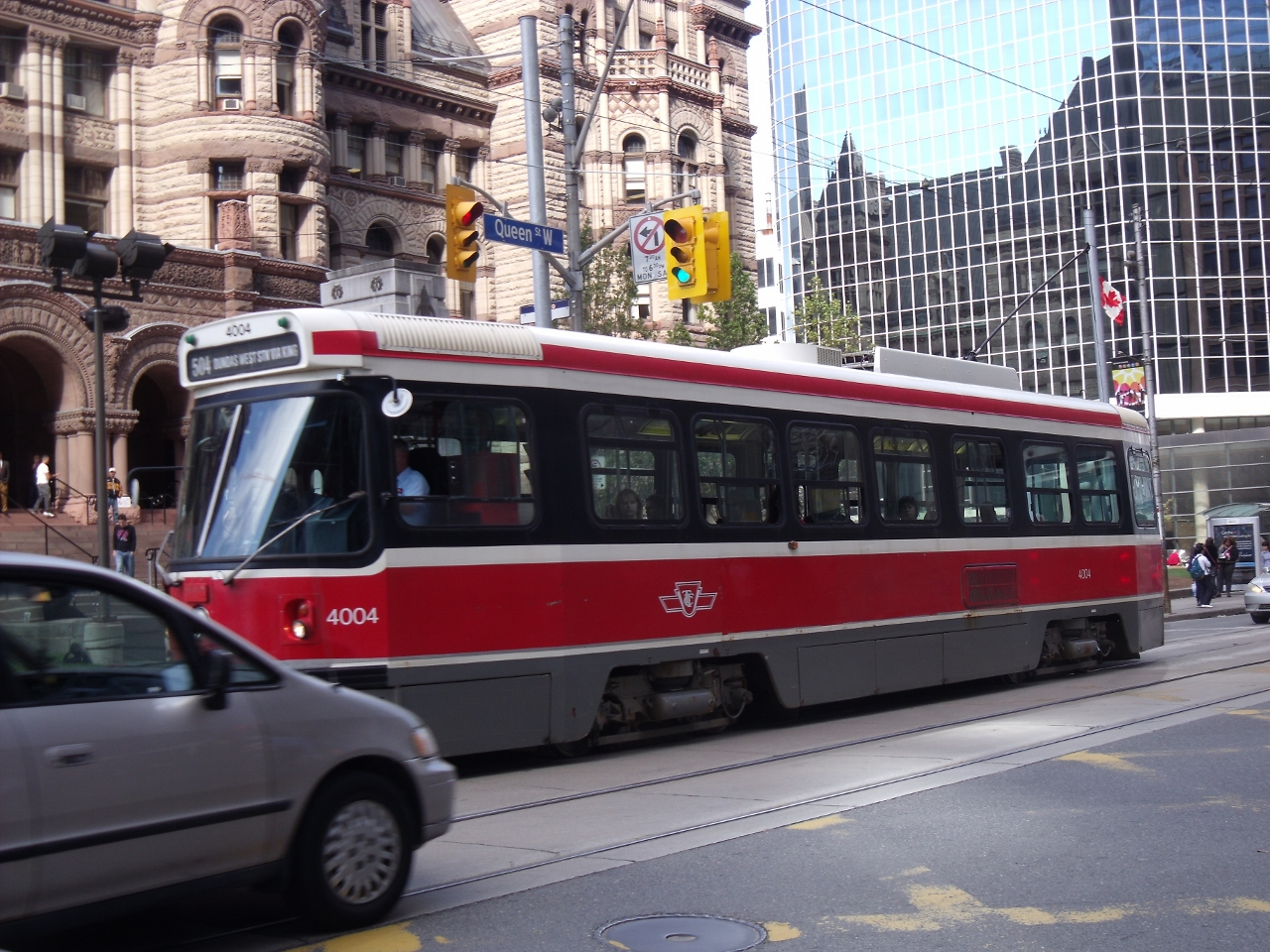
SIG-built CLRV L1 4004 in Toronto

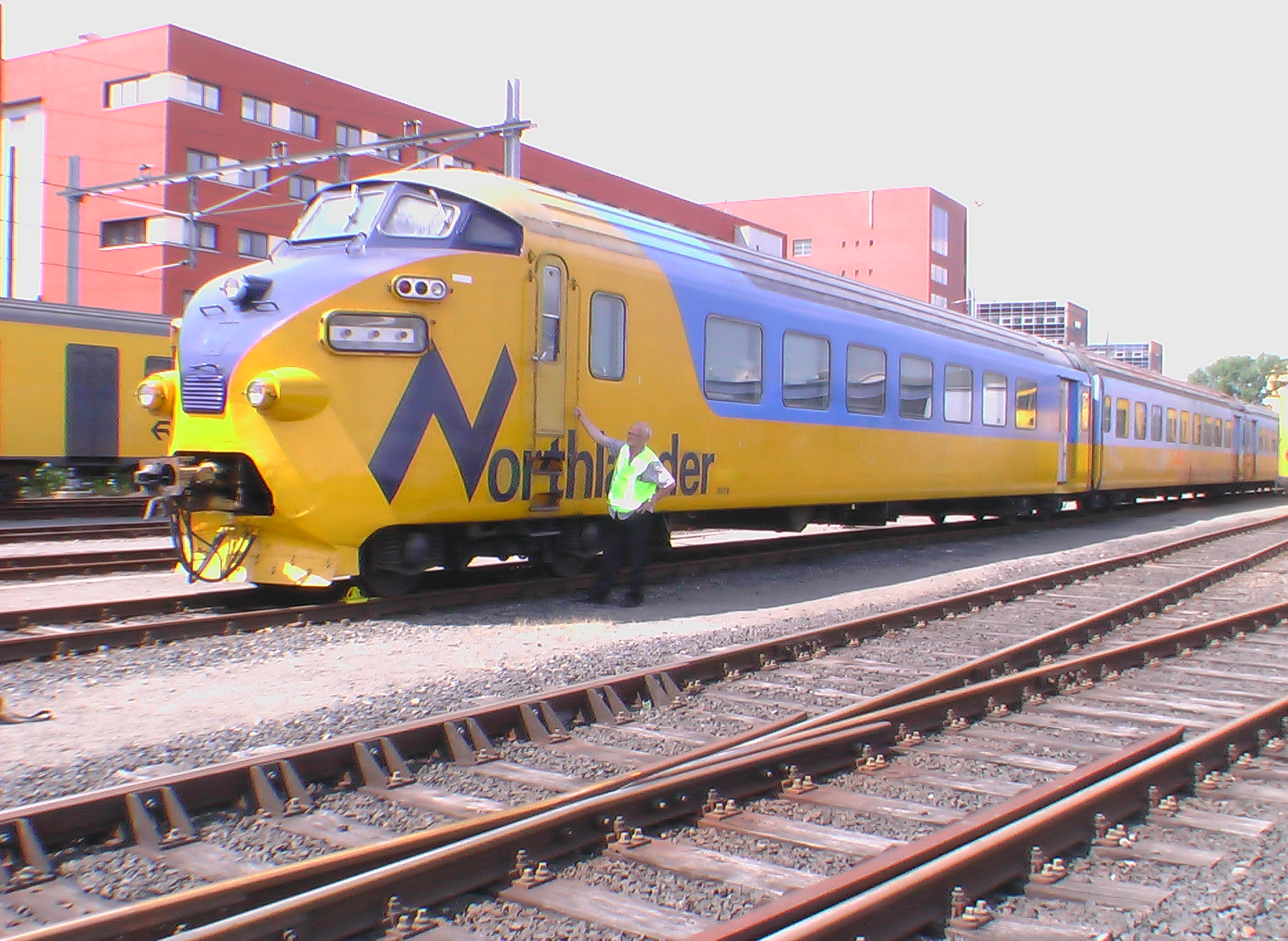
SBB RAm TEE I train set in ONR Northlander service

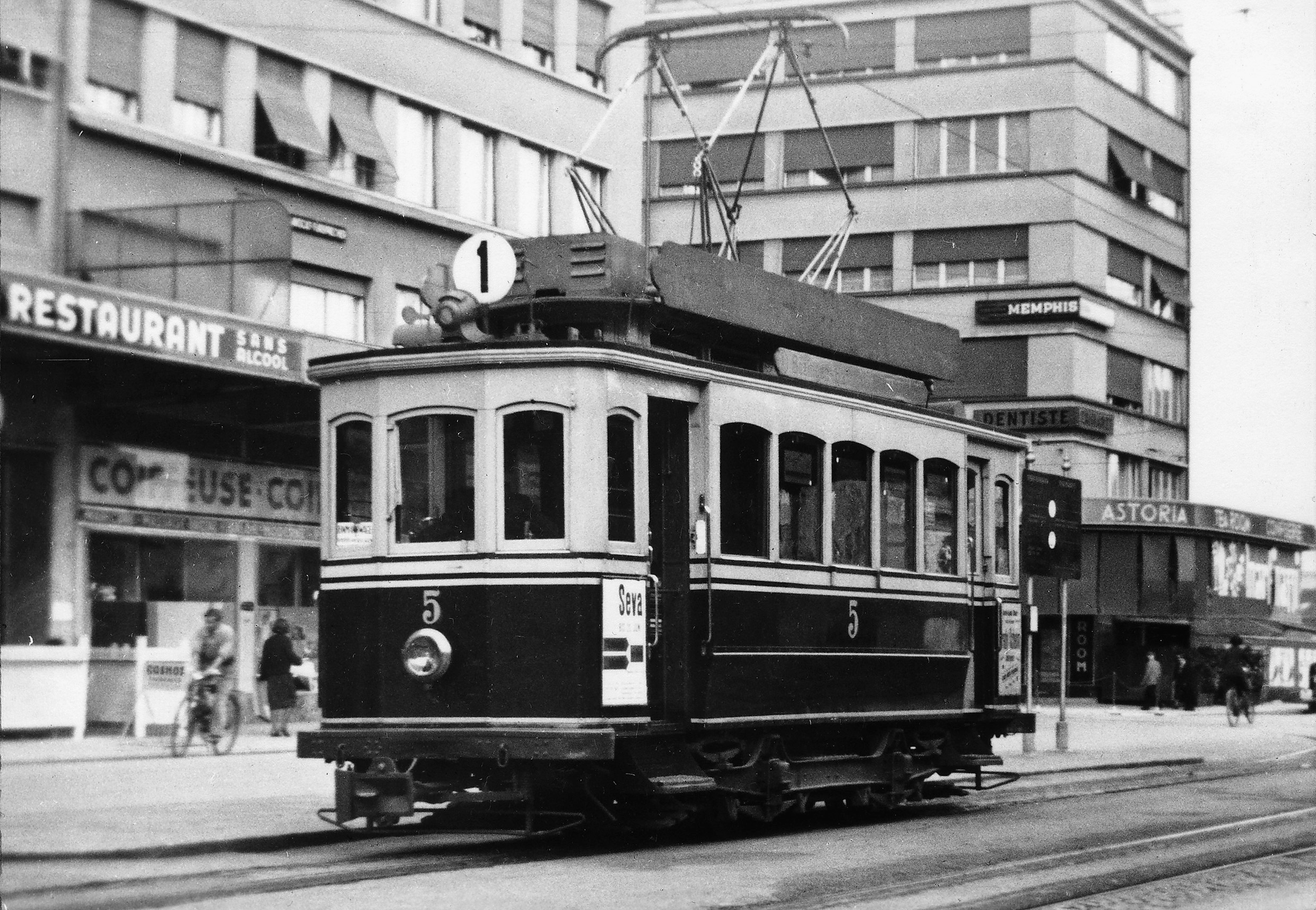
SIG-built tramway Ce 2/2 in Biel-Bienne

=== Firearms (1859–2000) ===
SIG started to produce the Prélaz-Burnand in 1859. It was invented by gunsmith Jean-Louis Joseph Prélaz and forestry inspector Colonel Édouard Burnand (father of Swiss painter Eugène Burnand). In 1860, the rifle won a competition held by the Swiss Military Department, resulting in a contract to produce 30,000 pieces. This rifle was adapted as the M1863.

Upon receiving the contract to produce rifles, the company name was changed to reflect its new emphasis on machined production, becoming Schweizerische Industrie Gesellschaft (SIG) in German, Swiss Industrial Company in English, and Société Industrielle Suisse in French.

SIG produced the Mondragón Rifle between 1908 and 1910. The SIG P210 pistol was developed in 1937 based on the French Modèle 1935, and was adopted by the Swiss military in 1949 as the "Pistole 49". This pistol's frame design incorporates external rails which fit closely with the slide, thus eliminating play in the mechanism during firing. The P210 was noted for its accuracy. The Petter-Browning patent was a refinement—and John Moses Browning's last design—of the Browning Hi-Power (P35).

In 1975, the Swiss military replaced the P210 with the P220, dubbed the "Pistole 75", which was the first product of a partnership with J.P. Sauer & Sohn. In a 1984 bidding contest to provide more than 300,000 sidearms to the US military, the SIG Sauer P226 was defeated by Beretta's 92FS which was awarded the contract for the M9 pistol. The SIG SG 510, or Sturmgewehr 57, battle rifle was produced by SIG from 1957 to 1983. Its appearance was vaguely similar to the German MG34 light machine gun, due to its ventilated barrel jacket. It employed roller-delayed blowback, as used on the CETME/HK rifles. The only general purpose machine gun produced by SIG was the SIG 710-3, which is based on the MG42.

Due to Swiss restrictions on the export of military weapons, SIG entered into a relationship with the German company J.P. Sauer & Sohn, in order to give SIG access to the global firearms market. During the 1970s, SIG purchased both Hämmerli and J.P. Sauer & Sohn, resulting in the formation of SIG Sauer.

In January 1985, SIGARMS was established in Tyson's Corner, Virginia, where its handgun models P220 and P230 were imported into the US from its sister company in Europe. In 2007, SIGARMS changed its name to SIG Sauer. SIG Arm's division was purchased in 2000 by L & O Holding, and is now known as SIG SAUER AG.

== Business areas and locations ==
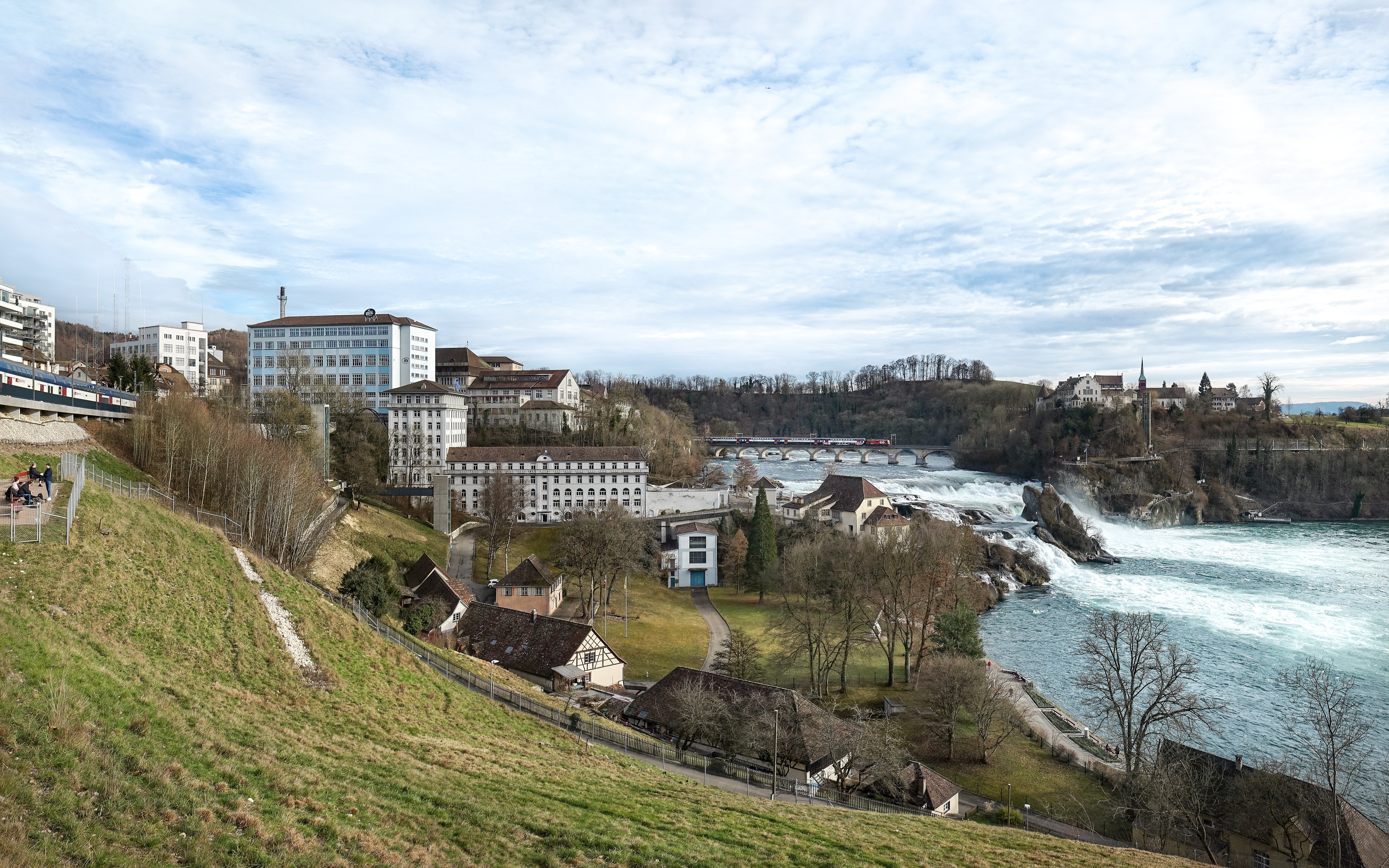
SIG site at the Rhine Falls managed by the SIG charitable foundation

SIG manufactures aseptic carton packs, bag-in-box packaging and spouted pouches for beverages and food, increasingly based on the world’s first aluminium-layer-free aseptic packs and fully renewable materials. It also produces, operates and maintains packaging machines.

The ownership of the SIG site, located directly on the Rhine Falls, was transferred to the SIG Charitable Foundation in 2011. In addition to the conversion of the site (residential, commercial, retail, gastronomy), it is still home to the company's headquarters and a production facility with 200 employees. The SIG Group has 90 subsidiaries in 41 countries in Europe, Asia, Middle East, Africa, North, Central and South America The most important production sites are located in Neuhausen am Rheinfall, Saalfelden, Linnich, Wittenberg, Alsdorf, Eisfeld, Tilburg, Barcelona, Shanghai, Suzhou, Palghar, Pune, Ahsan, Hsinchu, Rayong, Edinburgh North, Riyadh, Northlake, Peachtree City, Querétaro, Campo Largo, Vinhedo and Santiago.

The SIG Foundation is active in projects targeted towards civil society and the environment. Its main initiatives are ‘Cartons for Good’ and ‘Recycle for Good’. Cartons for Good intends to save surplus food from being wasted, support farmers’livelihoods, and nourish people in need. The initiative has been piloted in Bangladesh. Winning the project competition by the Save Food Initiative (with involvement of the Food and Agriculture Organization of the United Nations) in 2023 facilitated a locally based study in Egypt. The community recycling program Recycle for Good focuses on encouraging the public to deliver their recyclable waste to a collection point and practice the circular economy. The program in Indonesia (initiated in March 2023) established more than 150 collection points in Jakarta and Greater Jakarta Area in one year.

== See also ==
- Packaging and labeling
- Food packaging
