= Aitrang =

- Municipality
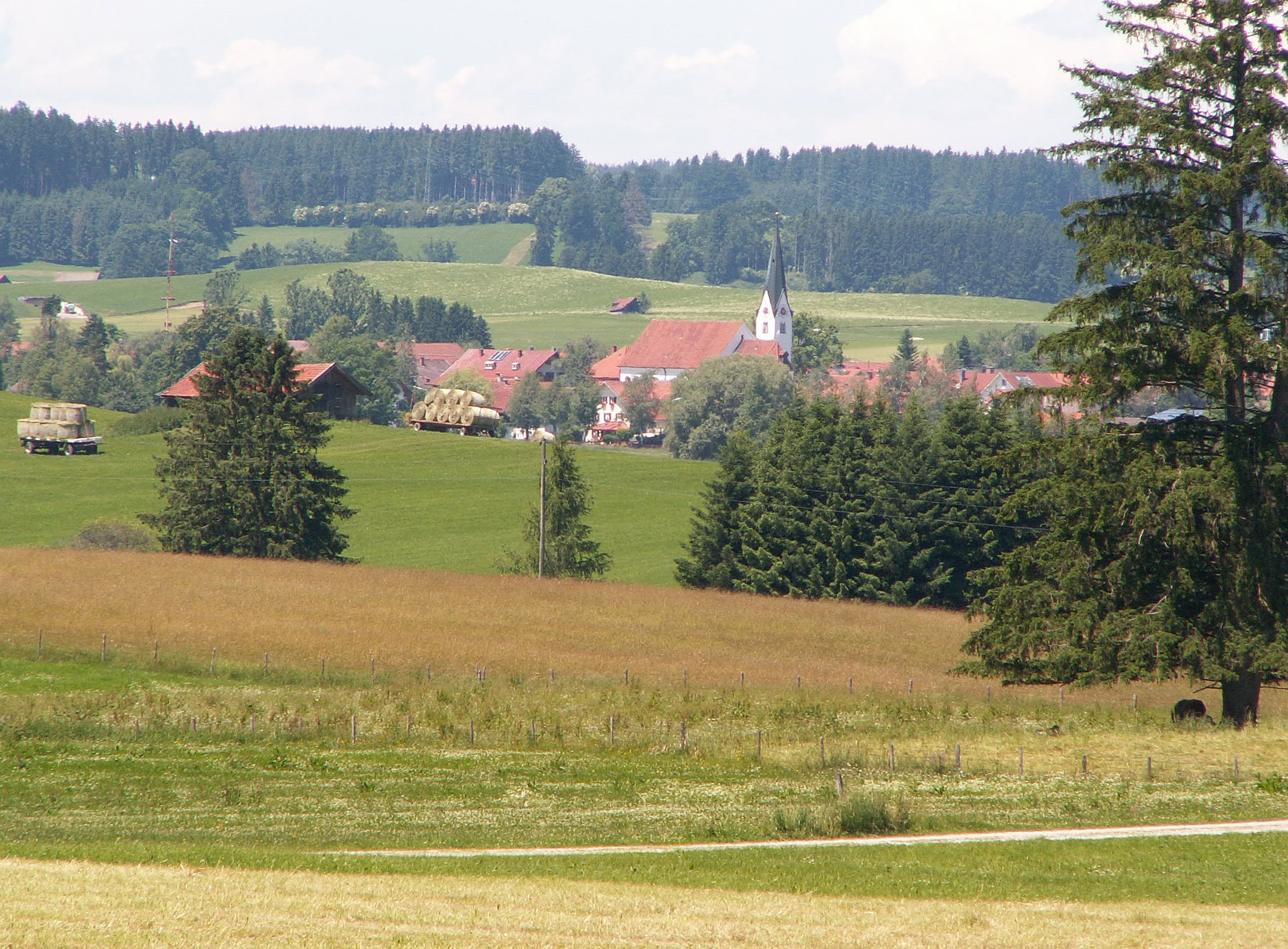
- Aitrang seen from the southeast

- Coat of arms

- Location of Aitrang within Ostallgäu district
- Interactive map of Aitrang
- Location within Germany Location within Bavaria
- Coordinates: 47°49′N 10°32′E
- Country: Germany
- State: Bavaria
- Admin. region: Schwaben
- District: Ostallgäu
- Municipal assoc.: Biessenhofen

Government
  - Mayor (2020–26): Michael Hailand

Area
  - Total: 30.73 km^{2} (11.86 sq mi)
- Elevation: 745 m (2,444 ft)

Population (2025-12-31)
  - Total: 2,031
  - Density: 66.09/km^{2} (171.2/sq mi)
- Time zone: UTC+01:00 (CET)
  - Summer (DST): UTC+02:00 (CEST)
- Postal codes: 87648
- Dialling codes: 08343
- Vehicle registration: OAL
- Website: www.aitrang.de

Aitrang (German pronunciation: [ˈaɪtʁaŋ]) is a municipality in the district of Ostallgäu in Bavaria in Germany.

== Geography ==
Aitrang lies in the south Bavarian Region Allgäu.

It encompasses districts of: Aitrang, Huttenwang, Wenglingen. Administrative responsibility also extends to the outlying villages of Binnings, Goerwangs, Krähberg, Neuenried, Wolfholz, Münzenried and Umwangs as well as several Farms. The district also covers the Eibsee (lake).

== History ==
Earliest written record of Aitrang can be found in the records of the King of the Franken Pepin the Short (741–768) where the village is mentioned. The village was considered the property of the Reichsvogtei (Abbot's Residence) and St. Mang's Abbey, Füssen, and from 1227 was signed over and charged to the Lower Court Authority. The Reichsvogtei had been confiscated many times due to debts, and finally was sold in 1524 to the Fürststift Kempten. For a time leading up to the year 1803 the rights over the village were divided between the Town of Kempten (to the west) and Abby of St. Mang in Füssen to the south. In 1803 the village was finally assigned to the Duke (Fürsten|Fürst) of Oettingen-Wallerstein. In 1806 a further change took place when the region was succeeded as part of the Rheinbundakte to the state of Bavaria. As part of the reform of Bavarian Administration in 1818 the village took on the legal form which prevailed through to 1978 when the sub-districts of Huttenwang, Hamlet of Neuenried, Umwangs and Wolfholz were merged into Aitrang. In 1982 the Hamlet of Wenglingen (previously part of Apfeltrang near Kaufbeuren) was adopted after a local referendum.

=== Population Growth ===
In the modern boundaries of the Political border of the village, the growth is as follows 1970 Aitrang had 1,632 residents, 1987 it had 1,757 and in 2000 1.942.

== Religion ==
The majority of the residents of Aitrang are Catholics, however there are also a small number of the Protestant faith. The only church in the village itself is the church of Ulrich, named after the Beneficiary of Augsburg. The congregation is served by the vicar Maximilian Hieble, who is also responsible for conducting services the community of Huttenwang. In Wenglingen there is also a chapel called Rosinakapelle. In Görwangs there is the (on a hill to the north and overlooking the village) the small but beautifully decorated Pilgrims church of St. Alban.

== Politics ==
The town mayor is Michael Hailand, elected in March 2020.

In 1999 the community taxes raised were in the region of 900,000 Euros, In these there was Business taxes of some 224,000 Euros.

=== Crest ===
The Village crest is a "vertically split shield; left side horizontally divided into Red and Blue, the right side is silver (or white on paper) with a vertical Abbots staff encompassed by two Blue Bows (without arrows)."

== Business and Infrastructure ==
=== Business and Farm- and Forestry ===
In the business sector of Farm and Forestry there were six players in 1998 with 193 production staff, in trade and transport 20 regular employees. In other trades there was 79 employees active. In the Village the number of gainfully employed persons is 595 in total. In the processing industry there are no businesses, In the building and Construction there are six. Additionally in 1999 there were some 93 Farms with a total of 5,372 Arces. Most of this is maintained as Grassland.

=== Education ===
In 1999 there was:

- a Kindergärten with maximum 72 places, but only 60 children attending
- a Primary school with 11 teachers and 187 students

== Major rail accident ==
9 February 1971 – During the inter city journey of the Trans-Europ Express (TEE) 56 Bavaria from Munich Hbf to Zürich HB a serious accident occurred with the loss of 28 lives. A further 42 were injured. The train was formed of an SBB-CFF-FFS RAm TEE I four-car diesel train with the driving trailer leading, and with the power car pushing from the rear. After passing the small station "Aitrang" (where the TEE did not need to stop) the train continued into a very sharp curve in a narrow gorge between two hills at a speed of approximately 130 km/h (81 mph) where a maximum speed of only 80 kilometres per hour (50 mph) was permitted. It subsequently derailed and uprooted both its own tracks as well as the oncoming tracks before four-car train rolled down the dip into the stream and road that also shared the same path through the hills. A short while later and before anyone could prevent it, a pair of Uerdingen railbuses coming from Kempten came around the bend and into the debris of the crashed train. They were unable to determine the cause of the disaster (see Eisenbahnunfall von Aitrang on German Wikipedia for more details).

== Picture Gallery ==
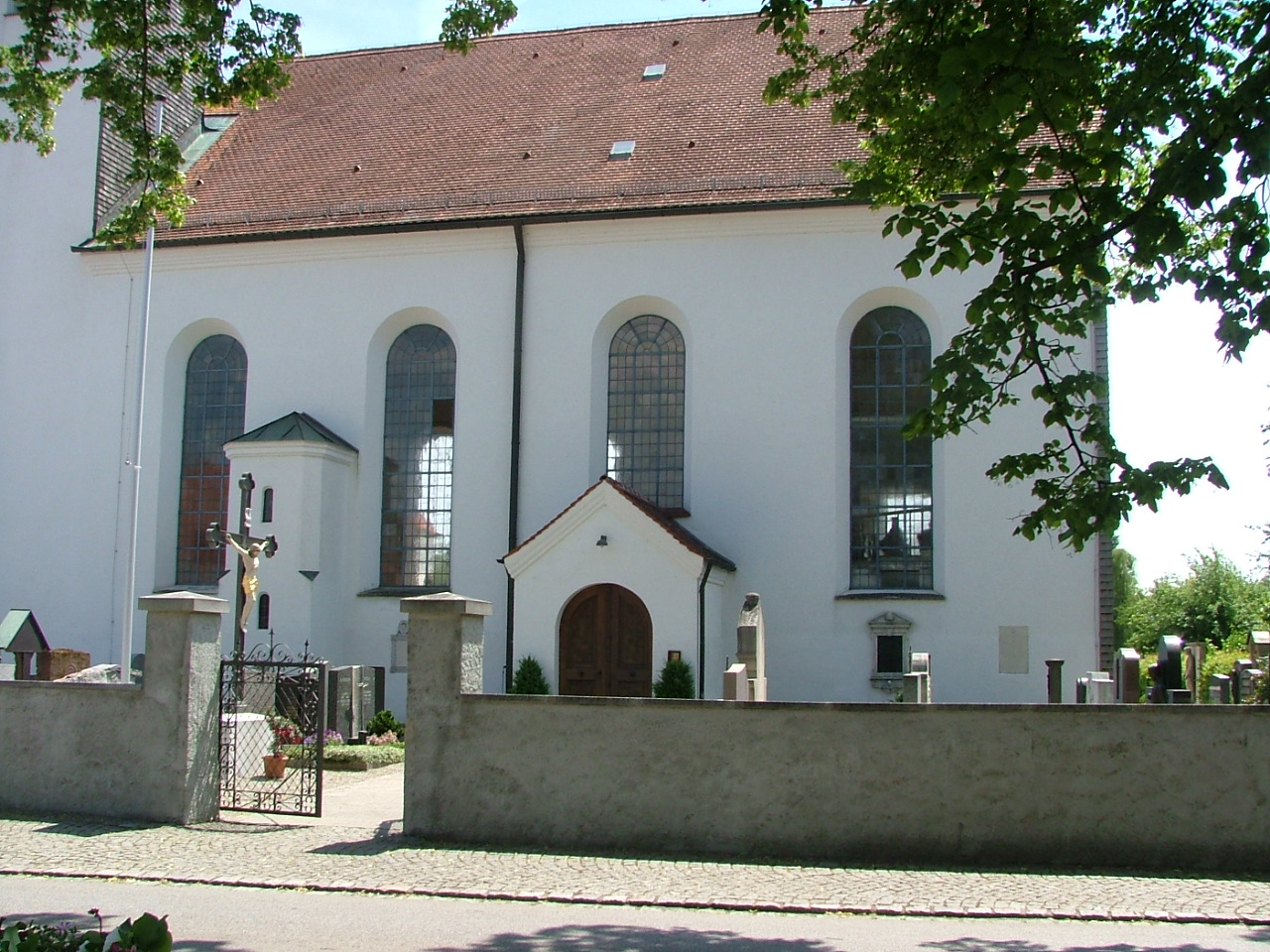
Pfarrkirche St.Ulrich

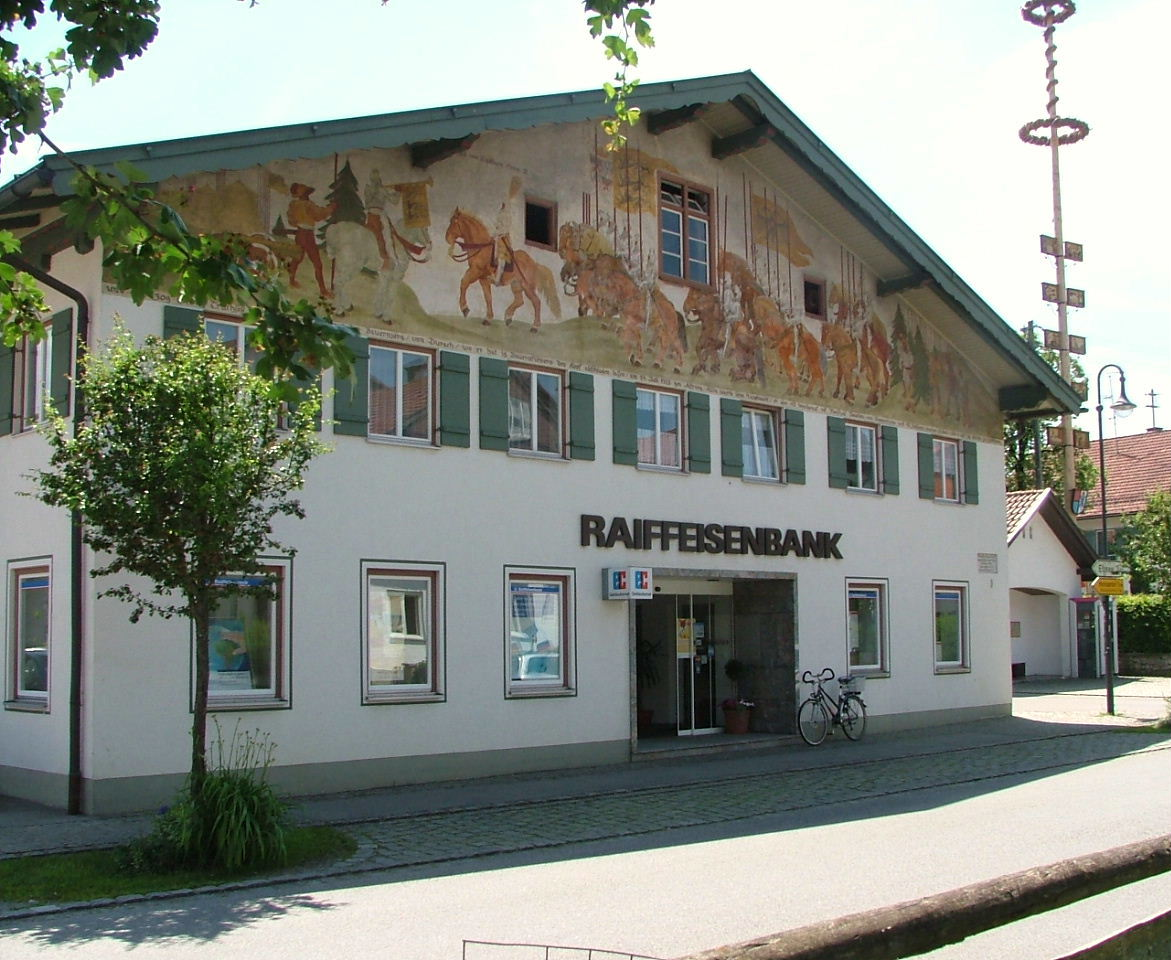
Sehenswertes Giebelfries

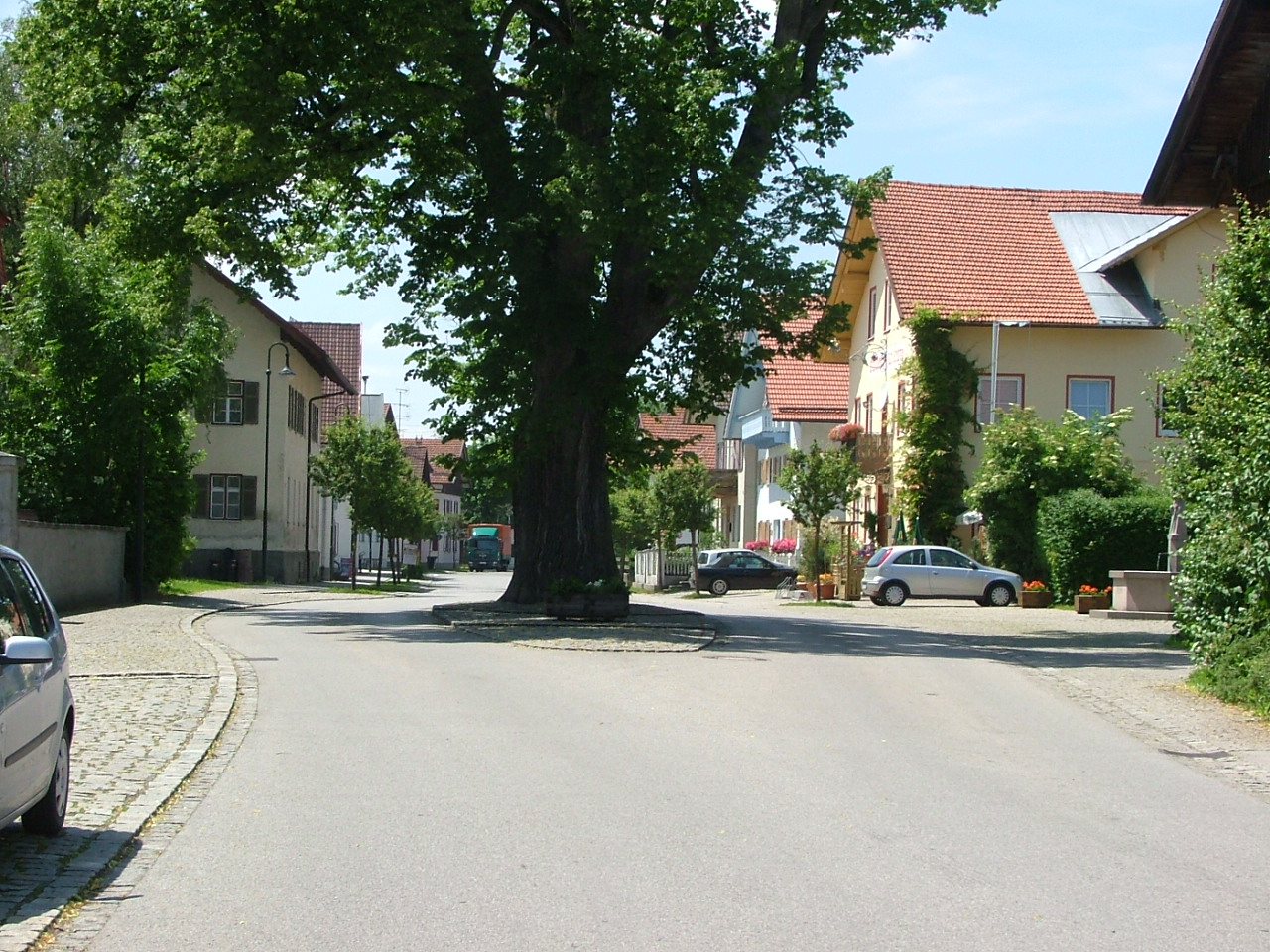
Ortsmitte mit Linde

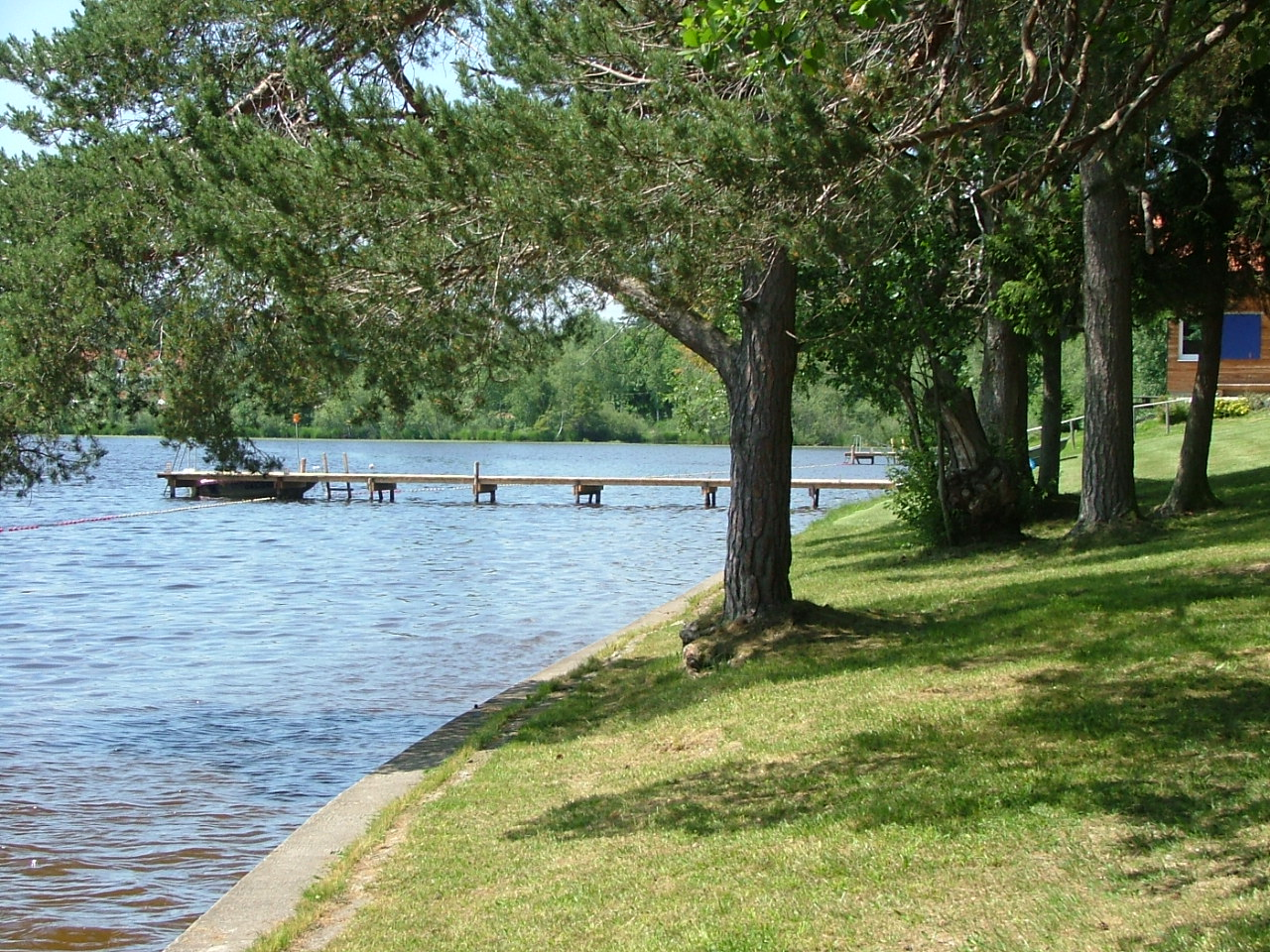
Elbsee südlich von Aitrang
