= Société Anonyme des Plieuses Automatiques Lausanne =

SAPAL (Société Anonyme des Plieuses Automatiques Lausanne) was a Swiss company founded in August 1906 by Jean-Jaques Kohler. Backed by a group of investors, this chocolate maker from Lausanne, Switzerland, had acquired the US patent for the "folding box" die-fold system, designed by Richard Berger, a German engineer, which enabled an envelope style of wrap around small chocolate blocks, and done in a single operation. The development and commercialization of this invention enabled fast rationalization in the packaging sectors of the food industry and more particularly, in the chocolate industry.

== Diverse applications ==
SAPAL added its own technical design department in 1908 and a production facility in 1909. It diversified its product range to wrap not only chocolate tablets but also soup cubes (1909), tobacco packets (1910), pressed candies and soaps (1911), biscuits (1912), chewing gum (1913), aspirin cases (1926), ice cream (1927), photographic plates (1928) and pharmaceutical tablets (1929).

In order to meet the growing and worldwide demand for automation, in 1963 SAPAL introduced the first packaging line linking the wrapping machines directly to the production process.

The premises in Lausanne became too small, so SAPAL moved in 1964 to a new factory in Écublens, on the outskirts of Lausanne, which is the present location of the company.

In 1989, SAPAL became a subsidiary of the SIG Pack Division of the SIG Group and in July 2004, SIG Pack was acquired by the Bosch Packaging Technology Group.

In 2007, SAPAL has acquired the Geneva-based brand Kustner (packaging of cheese). Cheese packaging machines make up nearly half of the turnover of SAPAL.

In 2017, the Navigator Group managed to acquire SAPAL as it turned out to have little synergy potential with other Bosch Packaging Technology divisions.

The number of employees has dropped from up to 400 in the 1990s to approximately 80 who construct and export their machines to 70 countries.
