= Dahlerau =

Coordinates: 51°14′N 7°17′E

Dahlerau is a borough of Radevormwald in Oberbergischer Kreis, located in the state of North Rhine-Westphalia, Germany. It is situated in the valley of the river Wupper, about 7 km by road away from Radevormwald city centre.

It was the site of the Dahlerau train disaster, a severe railway collision in 1971. Until 1996 Dahlerau was a site of textile manufacturing, and is now home to a museum about the industry, based in a former factory.
