= Dahlerau train disaster =

1971 railway accident in Dahlerau, North Rhine-Westphalia, West Germany

Coordinates: 51°13′30″N 7°19′20″E

- Accident site, showing the destroyed first coach of the passenger train.

Details
- Date: May 27, 1971
- Location: Dahlerau, Radevormwald, Oberbergischer Kreis, North Rhine-Westphalia
- Country: West Germany
- Line: Wupper Valley Railway
- Operator: Deutsche Bundesbahn
- Incident type: Collision
- Cause: Not determined

Statistics
- Trains: 2
- Deaths: 46
- Injured: 25

The Dahlerau train disaster was a railway accident that occurred on May 27, 1971, in Dahlerau, a small town in Radevormwald, West Germany, in which a freight train and a passenger train collided head-on. Forty-six people perished in the accident; forty-one were senior year pupils of the Geschwister-Scholl-Schule in Radevormwald. It was the deadliest accident in West Germany since its foundation in 1949, surpassed after German reunification by the Eschede train disaster in 1998.

== Timeline of events ==
Dahlerau station at the time of the accident.

On the evening of May 27, 1971, shortly after 21:00, a train made up of two class VT 95 railbuses of the Deutsche Bundesbahn was running as special service Eto 42227 (units 795 375 + 995 325) on the single-track line between Wuppertal-Oberbarmen and Radevormwald, the Wupper Valley Railway. The train was filled with senior year pupils of a Radevormwald middle school, their teachers and accompanying railway staff, on the return journey from a class trip to Bremen. The service was about 30 minutes delayed by the time it left the previous station at Wuppertal-Beyenburg. A regular local freight train, Ng 16856 (pulled by 212 030, a DB Class V 100 engine) was approaching Dahlerau station in the opposite direction at this time, so the signalmen at Dahlerau and Beyenburg agreed that the freight should stop at Dahlerau station to let the delayed special pass. In normal operation, the freight train would not stop at Dahlerau.

Dahlerau station was equipped with entrance signals, which could show aspects Hp 0 (stop) or Hp 1 (proceed); but it lacked exit signals to control departing trains. In place of exit signals, 'stop' boards were provided at the end of the platform. In absence of any other signal, all trains were obliged to stop at the board to await instructions; the signalman, however, could show a green hand lamp to an approaching train, which allowed its crew to ignore the stop board. This is what would normally have happened to the freight train.

The freight train passed the entrance signal as normal and proceeded slowly into the station, expecting the signalman's instructions. Although not strictly necessary according to the rules, the signalman declared that he showed a red hand lamp to the approaching freight train to make absolutely sure it would stop (according to the rules, the 'stop' board was enough to halt the train). It is unclear what happened next, but the train failed to stop as it was meant to, and departed toward Wuppertal. The driver later claimed that the signalman had displayed a green hand lamp, the signal to pass the 'stop' board. The train trailed the points already set for the passenger train; the points' seal, which ruptures in such an event, was later found to be missing. About 800 metres (2,600 ft) north of the station, on a curve, both trains collided. The motor coach of the two-car special train was compacted to one third of its length and pushed backwards 100 metres (330 ft) by the freight locomotive, which was five times as heavy and whose front wall (without the driver's cab) was 20 centimetres (7.9 in) higher than the railbus.

The signalman at Dahlerau tried to stop the departing freight train by running alongside it and giving emergency signals, but failed to get the driver's attention. He then immediately telephoned the signalman at Beyenburg to try and stop the passenger train, but it had already left. Neither of the stations nor the trains were equipped with radio, and there were no further signals in between the trains. The signalmen were powerless to stop the trains. Faced with a now-inevitable crash, the Dahlerau signalman phoned the emergency services and told them what was about to happen. Ambulances, firefighters and police were promptly sent from Radevormwald, Wuppertal and Solingen. The rescue effort was hindered by the inaccessibility of the accident site on a hillside and by parents who had waited for the train at Radevormwald station and had now come to search for their children, as well as onlookers who were attracted by the rescue effort. Thanks to quick rescue and medical treatment, 25 people survived despite severe injuries, but 41 pupils, two teachers, a mother and two railway staff died. A single pupil was the only person to escape uninjured.

A crisis squad was established at the Radevormwald town hall. Due to the high body count, the dead were laid out in the Bredderstraße gymnasium. Some of the funeral homes that were asked to supply coffins at night time first thought they were receiving prank calls due to the supposed improbability of such a severe accident.

== Cause of the accident ==
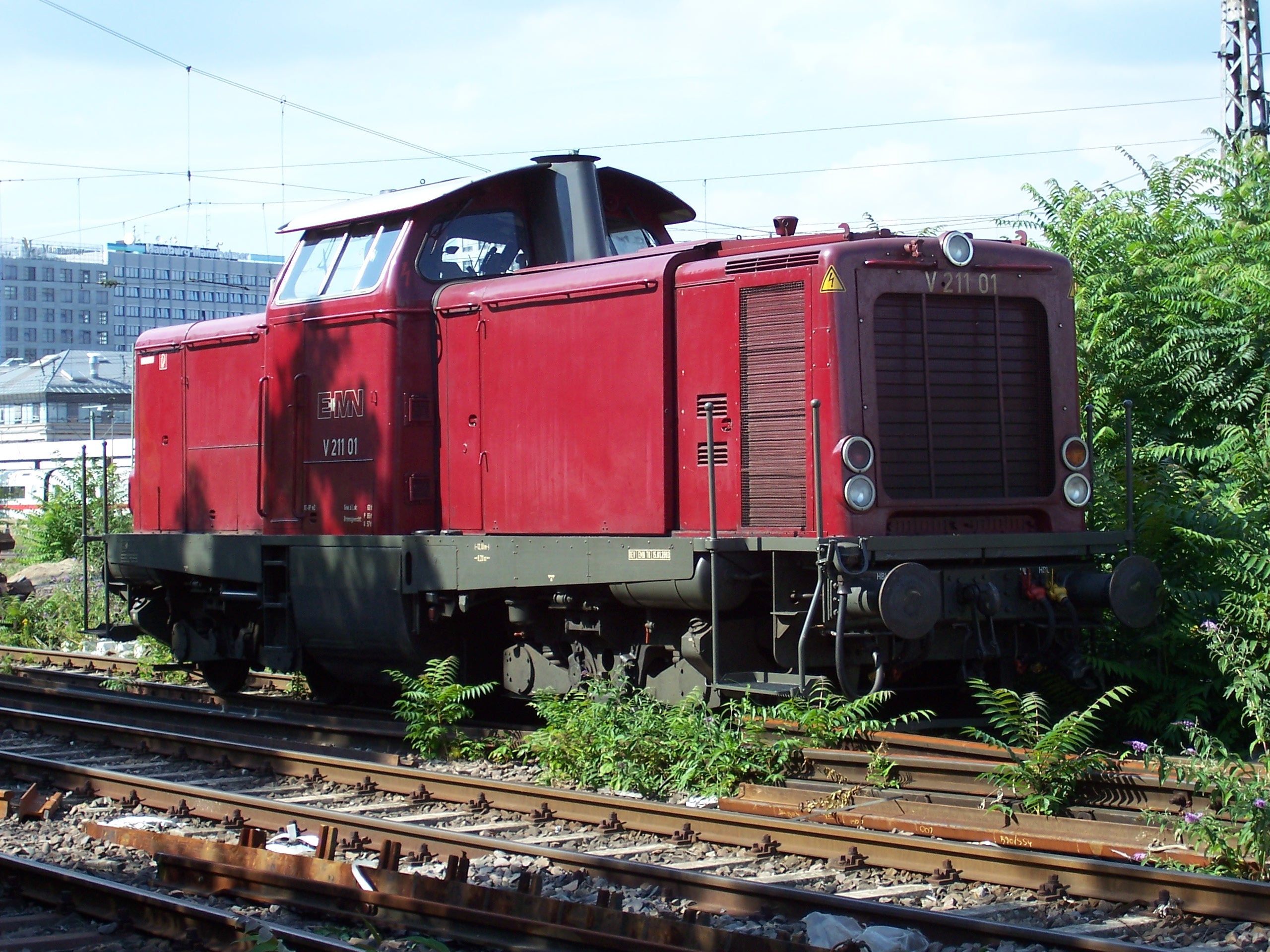
V100 engine, the same type as used on the freight train

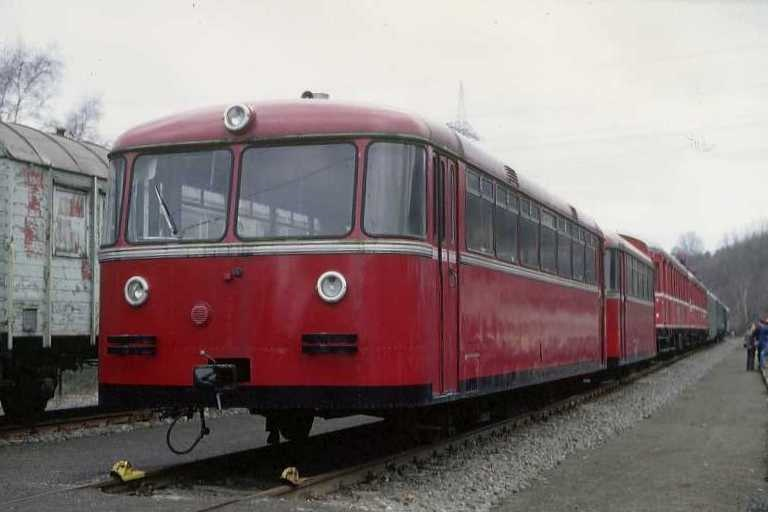
Railbus of the model involved in the accident

The legal proceedings investigating the cause of the accident carried on for a year. The exact sequence of events was never determined, as the Dahlerau signalman died in a car accident shortly after the train crash. It was proven that the car accident was not caused by the signalman, ruling out suicide. The driver of the freight train, who survived the accident, testified in court that he saw a green light from the signalman's hand lamp, signalling him to pass through the station without stopping.

The true cause of the accident was never fully clarified. It is generally accepted that the likely cause was some form of human error. As the dispatcher died during the hearings, the case never went to court.

As a consequence of the incident, the Deutsche Bundesbahn removed the coloured lens from the hand lamps, which could previously be switched between showing a green and a red light, to avoid the risk of confusion. The rules were changed so that a train which was to make an unscheduled stop at a station without exit signals had to be stopped at the entry signal before it being allowed into the station. The accident also provoked criticism of the lightweight construction of the railbus, which dated back to the 1950s. Their replacements, the DB Class 628 railcars that were built from the mid-1970s on, were constructed considerably more sturdily.

After the investigation ended, the damaged railbus was dismantled on September 1, 1971. The engine of the freight train, which did not suffer major damage, was rebuilt and continued in service until 2001.

== Funerals ==
Radevormwald was a small town with a population of about 20,000, and the effects of the accident were devastating on its population. An entire year of pupils was wiped out, and virtually everyone was affected directly or indirectly. Most of the dead teenage pupils were laid to rest in a separate grave on the Radevormwald cemetery. The funeral took place on June 2, 1971, a remarkably hot day, and was attended by about 10,000 people, among them Chancellor Willy Brandt, the Minister of Transport and the president of the Bundesrat. Public life came to a halt on that day, as shops closed and train service on the railway line was suspended during the funeral. Condolences arrived from places as far as France and Great Britain. An uncle of a pupil who died in the rail accident suffered a heart attack due to the hot weather and later died.

In 1972, a stone pillar containing the inscription "Von den vier Winden komme Geist und hauche über diese Toten, auf dass sie wieder lebendig werden" (Ezekiel 37.9, translates as "Come from the four winds, O breath, and breathe upon these slain, that they may live") was placed next to the graves. At first, the inscription was criticised as overly and inappropriately optimistic ("...that they may live"); the complaints later settled down.

== Aftermath ==
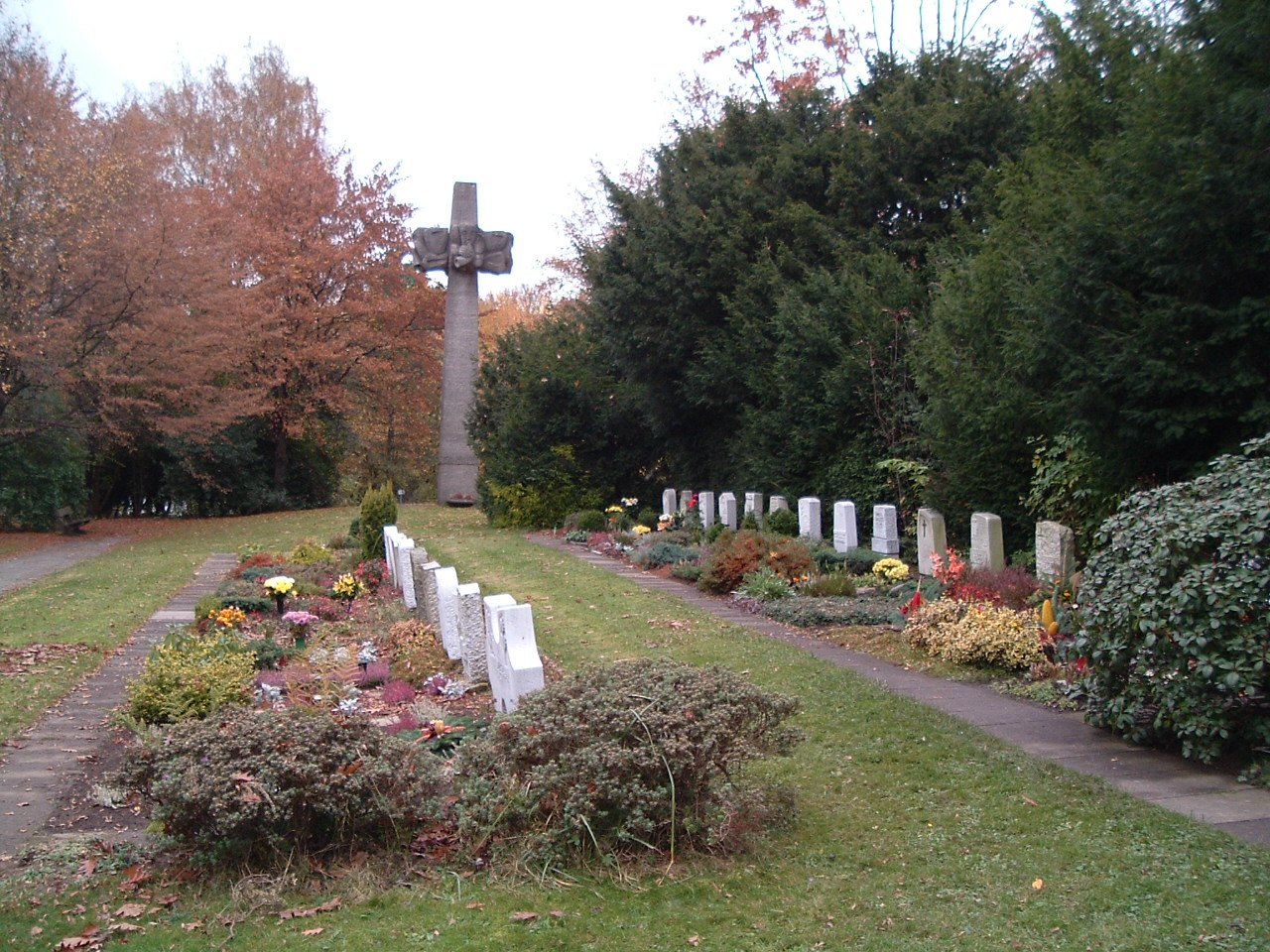
Graves at Radevormwald cemetery, 2004

40 years after the incident, the railway accident is an often-discussed event in the populace of Radevormwald, especially around its anniversary. While some regard discussing the topic as sensationalism, others consider the continuous dealing with the events as a lack or failure of coming to terms with it. As it was not yet common in the 1970s to offer psychological counselling for those involved in the accident, i.e. survivors, next of kin and rescue workers, and as the victims of the event were all local people (contrary to other large-scale accidents, where the geographical distribution of victims usually is less shallow), some unique behaviour patterns can be observed in Radevormwald. Most citizens know about the accident, and many had relatives or friends who were involved in the accident in some way. People who lost family members become aggressive towards those who survived, damaging the socio-psychological climate of the small town. It has been reported that some people, now in their 20s, suffer from post-traumatic stress disorder even though they were not alive at the time of the accident, and would go as far as not using trains at all. This is a behaviour previously observed with children of survivors of the Holocaust.

Exit signals, equipped with the Indusi automatic train stop system, were installed at Dahlerau station in 1975. The line from Wuppertal to Radevormwald was closed in 1976.

Since 1989, an initiative exists to establish a museum service on the line. The initiative has purchased part of the former railway line in 1994, including the station of Dahlerau and the place where the incident took place. The line only continues unto a point a few kilometres south of the station; the remaining length of track to Radevormwald was flooded during the construction of the Wupper Dam in the 1980s.
