= Simonazzi =

Simonazzi is a surname. Notable people with the surname include:

- Agide Simonazzi (1896–1951), Italian sprinter
- André Simonazzi (1968–2024), Swiss politician
- Antonio Simonazzi (1824–1908), Italian painter
- Francesco Simonazzi (born 2004), Italian racing driver
