= Bavaria (train) =

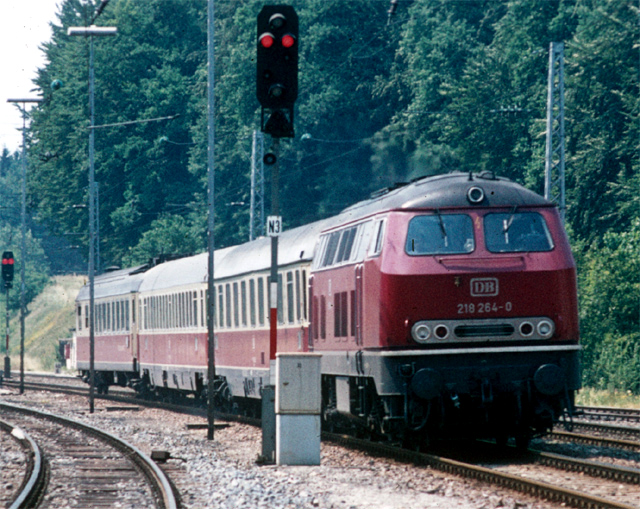
- Bavaria at Geltendorf on the Buchloe–Lindau railway

Overview
- Service type: Schnellzug (D) (1950s–1969); Trans Europ Express (TEE) (1969–1977); Schnellzug (D) (1977–1984); InterCity (IC) (1984–1987); EuroCity (EC) (1987–2002)
- Status: No longer a named train
- Locale: Germany; Switzerland
- First service: 1950s
- Last service: 2002
- Former operator(s): Deutsche Bundesbahn / Deutsche Bahn (DB); SBB-CFF-FFS

Route
- Termini: München Hbf; Geneva-Cornavin (until 1969); Zürich HB
- Distance travelled: 218 km (135 mi) (Munich–Zurich)
- Service frequency: Daily

Technical
- Track gauge: 1,435 mm (4 ft 8 1/2 in)
- Electrification: 15 kV AC, 16.7 Hz (Lindau–Zurich)

The Bavaria was an express train that linked München Hbf in Munich, Germany, with Zürich HB in Zurich, Switzerland. Introduced in the 1950s, it ran through to Geneva (Cornavin station) until 1969, when it was cut back to Zurich. The train was named on the basis that Bavaria is the Latin equivalent to the German word Bayern, the official name of the federal state of Bavaria, of which Munich is the capital. It was operated by the Deutsche Bundesbahn / Deutsche Bahn (DB) and the Swiss Federal Railways (SBB-CFF-FFS). The route also included a single stop in Austria, at Bregenz. The 24 km (15 mi) section between Lindau, Germany, and St. Margrethen, Switzerland, is located mostly in Austria, but Swiss locomotives hauled the train over this section, most of which is part of the Vorarlberg line of Austrian Federal Railways.

Originally and for several years, the Bavaria was a two-class Schnellzug (D), running Munich – Zurich – Bern – Geneva. As of 1963, the train was carrying a full restaurant car on the Munich – Lindau and St. Margrethen – Geneva portions, but by 1968 the dining car on the German portion had been replaced by a buffet car.

In 1969, the Bavaria was upgraded to a first-class-only Trans Europ Express (TEE), but the route was shortened in Switzerland, with the western terminus moved to Zurich. The TEE carried a restaurant car over the full route, Munich – Zurich, with service being provided by the Swiss Restaurant Car Company.

On 22 May 1977, the Bavaria reverted to being a two-class Schnellzug. Seven years later, effective 3 June 1984, it was reclassified as an InterCity (IC) train, and on 31 May 1987, it was included in the then-new EuroCity (EC) network. It ceased to be a named train at the end of 2002.

On 9 February 1971, the Bavaria was involved in a serious derailment and collision in Aitrang, Bavaria, in which the train formation (consist) was destroyed, and 28 people lost their lives.

== See also ==
- History of rail transport in Germany
- History of rail transport in Switzerland
- List of named passenger trains of Europe
