= Radevormwald =

- Town
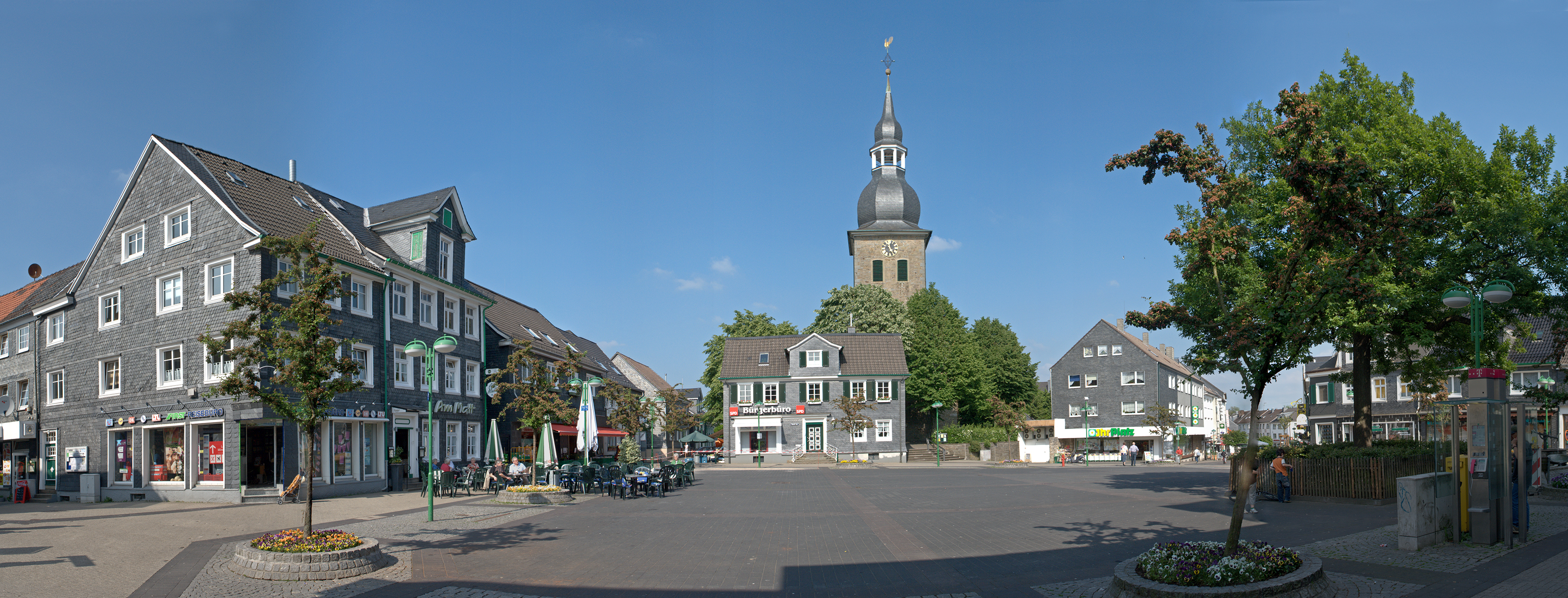
- Marktplatz (market place)

- Flag Coat of arms

- Location of Radevormwald within Oberbergischer Kreis district
- Interactive map of Radevormwald
- Location within Germany Location within North Rhine-Westphalia
- Coordinates: 51°12′N 7°21′E
- Country: Germany
- State: North Rhine-Westphalia
- Admin. region: Köln
- District: Oberbergischer Kreis

Government
  - Mayor (2025–-): Dejan Vujinovic (CDU)

Area
  - Total: 53.86 km^{2} (20.80 sq mi)
- Elevation: 421 m (1,381 ft)

Population (2025-12-31)
  - Total: 21,457
  - Density: 398.4/km^{2} (1,032/sq mi)
- Time zone: UTC+01:00 (CET)
  - Summer (DST): UTC+02:00 (CEST)
- Postal codes: 42477
- Dialling codes: 02195 (Radevormwald); 02191 (Villages in the Wupper valley)
- Vehicle registration: GM
- Website: www.radevormwald.de

Radevormwald (German: [ˌʁaːdəfɔʁmˈvalt]) is a municipality in the Oberbergischer Kreis, in North Rhine-Westphalia, Germany. It is one of the oldest towns in the Bergischen Land, formerly the County and Duchy of Berg.

== Geography ==
Radevormwald is located about 50 km east of Cologne. At 421 metres above sea level, it was the highest-situated town in the administrative region of Düsseldorf; it is now in the administrative region of Cologne.

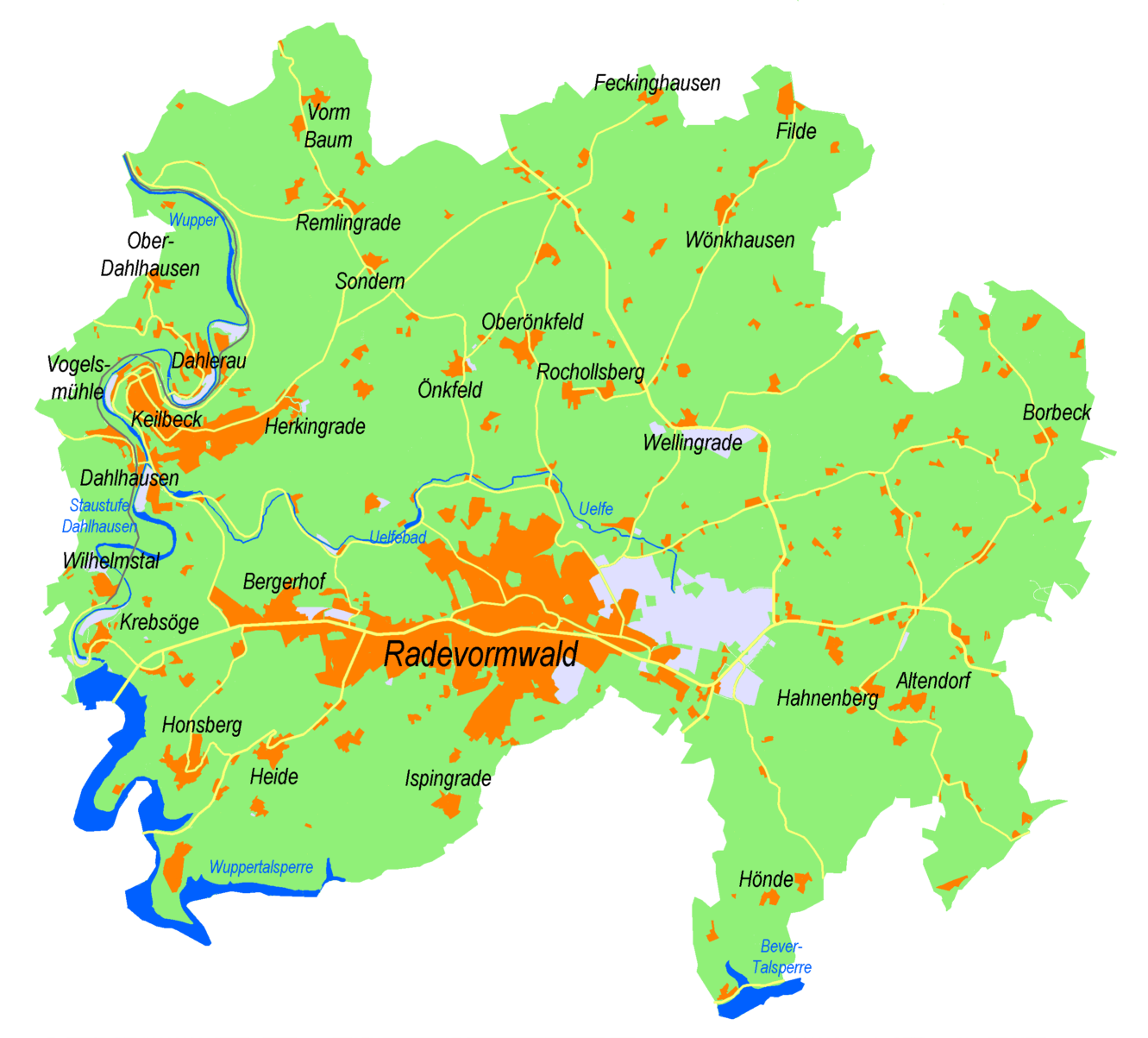
Map of Radevormwald

=== Neighbouring places ===
- Ennepetal
- Breckerfeld
- Halver
- Wipperfürth
- Hückeswagen
- Remscheid
- Wuppertal
- Schwelm

=== Division of the municipality ===
A	Altendorf - Altenhof - Am Grimmelsberg - Auf'm Hagen
B	Beck - Berg - Bergerhof - Birken - Böhlefeldshaus - Borbeck - Born - Braake - Brebach - Brunsheide - Brunshöh - Buschsiepen
D	Dahlerau - Dahlhausen - Diepenbruch - Dieplingsberg
E	Eich - Eistringhausen - Erlenbach - Espert
F	Feckinghausen - Feldmannshaus - Felsenbeck - Filde - Filderheide - Finkensiepen - Freudenberg - Fuhr - Funkenhausen
G	Geilensiepen - Grafweg - Griesensiepen - Grüne - Grünenbaum
H	Hahnenberg - Harbeck - Hardt - Heide - Heidt - Heidersteg - Herbeck - Herkingrade - Hinüber - Honsberg - Hönde - Hönderbruch - Höltersiepen - Hürxtal - Hulverscheidt - Husmecke
I	Im Busch - Im Hagen - Im Holte - Im Kamp - Im Walde - Im Wiesental - Im Wildental - Ispingrade
J	Jakobsholt
K	Kaffekanne - Karlshöh - Karthausen - Kattenbusch - Keilbeck - Kettlershaus - Klaukenburg - Knefelskamp - Kötterhaus - Kottmannshausen - Kräwinkel - Krebsöge - Krebsögersteg - Kronenberg
L	Laake - Lambeck - Lambeckermühle - Langenkamp - Landwehr - Leimbecker Mühle - Leimhol - Leye - Linde - Lichteneichen - Lorenzhaus
M	Milspe - Möllersbaum
N	Nadelsiepen - Neuenhammer - Neuenhaus - Neuenhof - Niederdahl - Niedernfeld - Niederwönkhausen
O	Oberbuschsiepen - Oberdahl - Oberdahlhauen - Obergraben - Obernfeld - Obernhof - Oberkarthausen - Oberschmittensiepen - Oedeschlenke - Önkfeld
P	Pastoratshof - Plumbeck - Rechelsiepen
R	Remlingrade - Rochollsberg - Rädereichen
S	Scheideweg - Scheidt - Schlechtenbeck - Schmittensiepen - Schnellental - Siepen - Sieplenbusch - Sondern - Stoote - Studberg
T	Tanne
U	Uelfe - Ümminghausen - Umbeck - Untergraben - Unterm Busch - Unterste Mühle
V	Vogelshaus - Vogelsmühle - Vor der Heide - Vor der Mark - Vorm Baum - Vorm Holte
W	Waar - Walkmüllersiepen - Wellershausen - Wellringrade - Weyer - Wiebach - Wilhelmstal - Winklenburg - Wintershaus - Wönkhausen
Z	Zum Hofe

Places submerged by the Wuppertal dam

- Dörpe
- Friedrichstal
- Nagelsberger Gemarke
- Oege

=== Wupper villages ===
The river Wupper flows through part of the town lands. In the villages Dahlerau, Vogelsmühle and Dahlhausen – which are located in the Wupper valley and so are known as the "Wupper villages" – this led to the establishment of textile works. These settlements used the water for the production of energy, at first by means of the water wheel and later through hydroelectric power plants. With the establishment of working-class dwellings by the textile companies the population of the Wupper villages increased. The middle classes also settled here, above all in Dahlerau where there were many single trading ventures. However, at the end of the 20th century the combination of the decline of the textile industry and increased mobility brought about the closure of most businesses in the Wupper villages; today, many former business premises are used as houses.

== History ==
=== The first documentary reference and municipal rights ===
The first known reference in writing to the town was in the year 1050. Klaus Pampus writes in his book Urkundliche Erstnennungen oberbergischen Orte (Earliest Documentary References to Places in Oberberg) that Radevormwald came into the possession of the imperial abbey of Werden and at the time was called Rotha.

Radevormwald was situated in the County, later Duchy, of Berg. Between 1309 and 1316 Count Adolf VI von Berg conferred municipal rights on the town. The settlement "vor dem walde" ("before the wood") is described in 1363 in a lease of Count Wilhelm II von Jülich-Berg (Duke Wilhelm I) as a walled town. Radevormwald served the Counts von Berg as a border stronghold against Sauerland in the County of Mark.

The especial significance of Radevormwald in the Middle Ages can be seen from the fact that it paid 166.5 guilders for the redemption of pledged lands of the Duchy of Berg, while for example Solingen, Elberfeld and Hückeswagen raised only 88, 84.5 and 34.5 guilders respectively.

=== 15th century ===
The town prospered. Walls, towers and gates protected the settled trades of the smiths, wool weavers and garment makers.

=== 16th century ===
In the 16th century there were two big town fires. The first took place on 17 July 1525. The second devastated the town in 1571.

In 1540, the parish and clergy of the town converted to the Reformed Church.

=== 17th century ===
In 1620 Radevormwald was conquered by the Protestant Hessians under Philip the Magnanimous. During the Thirty Years' War (1618–48) it was used as the occasional headquarters and supply depot of the Spaniards and Austrians, under the command of Ottavio Piccolomini (one of Wallenstein's generals). In 1635 and 1636 Dutch troops, and in 1638 Westphalian troops, occupied the place, before it fell once again to Hesse in 1639. These military occupations were accompanied by murder, looting, arson and rape of the civil population, which was decimated.

After the Peace of Westphalia in 1648, the Catholic Duke of Berg, Philipp Wilhelm von Pfalz-Neuburg (reigned 1652–1690) persecuted Anabaptists and Mennonites in his territory, so that many of them fled. One such refugee was Adolf von der Leyen of Radevormwald, who in 1656 (or perhaps 1650) brought the new skill of silk weaving to Krefeld.

=== 18th century ===
In 1742 there was famine in Radevormwald.

=== 19th century ===
On 24 August 1802 the last great town fire in Radevormwald occurred. In 1833, a local mail coach service to the surrounding towns was established for the first time, and a post office opened. Towards the end of the century, the railway followed. On 1 March 1886 Radevormwald celebrated the opening of the Remscheid–Lennep–Krebsöge–Dahlerau–Wuppertal–Oberbarmen railway line. Four years later, on 3 February 1890 a branch line from Krebsöge to Radevormwald was opened. All railway lines near the town were typical of the Prussian branch lines which were built throughout Germany as part of an ambitious development program from 1885 onwards.

Radevormwald was a station on the needle telegraph line (1833 to 1849) from Berlin to Aachen. The location of the telegraph was in the modern street Am Telegraf.

In 1884 the municipal gasworks opened for business with the production of town gas.

=== The 20th century up to the First World War ===
In 1910 there were two important events. With the opening of a railway line to Halver the railway network around Radevormwald was completed, and on 1 July the second youth hostel in the world, and the first in the Rhineland, celebrated its inauguration.

=== The 20th century from the First World War to 1945 ===
Radevormwald developed into an industrial location. Local businesses included lock-, file-, bicycle-, paper-, ice-skate- and building component factories, motor and textile industries, yarn-spinning and cloth mills.

At 8:15 on the morning of 26 May 1928 a Deutsche Luft Hansa Junkers F13 airplane crashed in Hahnenberg on the Schlegel meadow (Schlegelsche Wiese), killing three people. In November 1934, the connection of a gas pipeline caused the gasworks to moderate its production of town gas.

=== The 20th century from 1945 ===
==== Bismarck motorcycles ====
In 1957, Bismarck motorcycle production ended in Bergerhof.

==== The Dahlerau train disaster ====
On the evening of 27 May 1971, a Deutsche Bundesbahn railbus ran as a special service on the Wuppertal—Radevormwald line. The train was full of schoolchildren on a school outing and was about 30 minutes behind schedule. An oncoming freight train failed to stop for reasons unclear, and collided with the railbus. 46 passengers died in the accident, including 41 schoolchildren. 25 passengers were injured, most of them seriously. The exact cause of the accident could not be determined, because the station controller died in a car accident shortly after the event. The surviving driver of the goods train stated at the inquest that the train controller had signalled green with his flashlight, indicating a free passage. None of the railway stations on this local branch line had a proper station exit signal.

Almost all of the dead schoolchildren were buried at the municipal cemetery in Radevormwald in a common enclosure with a stone monument inscribed: Come spirit of the four winds and breathe on these dead, that they may come alive (Komme Geist von den vier Winden herbei und hauche diese Toten an, damit sie lebendig werden). This accident was the worst rail disaster in West Germany until the Eschede train disaster in 1998.

=== From 1975 - Radevormwald in the Oberbergischer district ===
On 1 January 1975 the Rhein-Wupper and Rheinisch-Bergisch districts were merged and Radevormwald became part of the resulting Oberbergischer district. A year later, on 28 May 1976 regular passenger traffic on the railway to Radevormwald ended.

Since the 1950s construction of the Wuppertal dam had been planned. In the mid-1980s the many years of preparation concluded, and construction began. Numerous places had to be demolished, so that in 1987 the Krebsöge dam could be inaugurated. In the same year the B 237 bypass was opened.

In 1990 Radevormwald tried to live up to its reputation as a sports town with the inauguration of the stadium in the Kollenberg and the indoor swimming pool Aquafun. However, these efforts suffered a setback in 2004 when the State sports school closed down.

== Coat of arms ==
The coat of arms was granted on 7 November 1934. It consists of a lion grasping a key.

The oldest seal of the city, dating from the 14th century, already shows the lion with a key. All later seals show the same image, the lion in the arms being that of the Counts von Berg. The origin of the key is not clear. It may have had a religious meaning, but it has also been speculated that it symbolises the iron industry (particularly locksmithing) in the town.

(In the early 20th century the arms were shown in the Kaffee Hag albums [a standard reference for German civic arms] with the same composition, but in different colours).

== General description ==
=== Origin of the name ===
Radevormwald means "clearing in front of the wood". The town's older name, Rotha, also means "clearing". The clearing, at an altitude of more than 400 metres, is thought to have been made to help defend against raiding Saxons in prehistoric times.

=== Character ===
Radevormwald is characterised by its small and medium-sized businesses, predominantly in the service industries. With regard to the rail connections to Cologne and Düsseldorf to the west and to transport connections generally the town is in a marginal position. This leaves scope for the exploitation of resources for leisure and the enjoyment of nature, and gives the town a relatively high quality of life.

Older historical buildings, as in many other places in the Bergischen country, have not survived. An exception is the historical garden house in the town park which survived the last big town fire in the year 1802.

== Population ==
Historical population

Year	Pop.	±% p.a.
1792	4,320	—
1807	3,429	−1.53%
1826	5,383	+2.40%
1865	8,879	+1.29%
1900	10,446	+0.47%
1939	13,861	+0.73%
1946	17,159	+3.10%
1961	20,957	+1.34%
1965	21,415	+0.54%
1970	22,338	+0.85%
1975	23,783	+1.26%

Year	Pop.	±% p.a.
1980	23,611	−0.15%
1985	22,789	−0.71%
1990	23,762	+0.84%
1995	24,353	+0.49%
2000	24,800	+0.36%
2005	23,970	−0.68%
2010	22,526	−1.23%
2015	22,386	−0.12%
2020	21,963	−0.38%
2025	21,457	−0.47%

Source: Landesdatabank Nordrhein-Westfalen (1965-2025)

== Culture ==
=== Places To Go ===
In the area are many different dams and reservoirs, among them: Wuppertal dam, Bevertal dam, Neyetal dam (Wipperfürth), Ennepe dam (Breckerfeld), Heilenbecker dam and Schevelinger dam.

- Uelfebad, former outdoor swimming pool (an ice rink in winter, with suitable weather) and restaurant
- Leisure resort Kräwinklerbrücke, which is also a starting point for footpaths around the Wuppertal dam.

=== Churches ===
Radevormwald has a distinctive skyline with four churches close together:

- Protestant Reformed church (state church)
- Protestant Lutheran church (state church)
- Lutheran Church St. Martin (Independent Evangelical-Lutheran Church)
- Roman Catholic church

Other churches are to be found in Remlingrade (Protestant Church), in Wallenberg (Protestant Church) and in Dahlerau (both a Protestant and a Catholic church).

=== Monuments ===
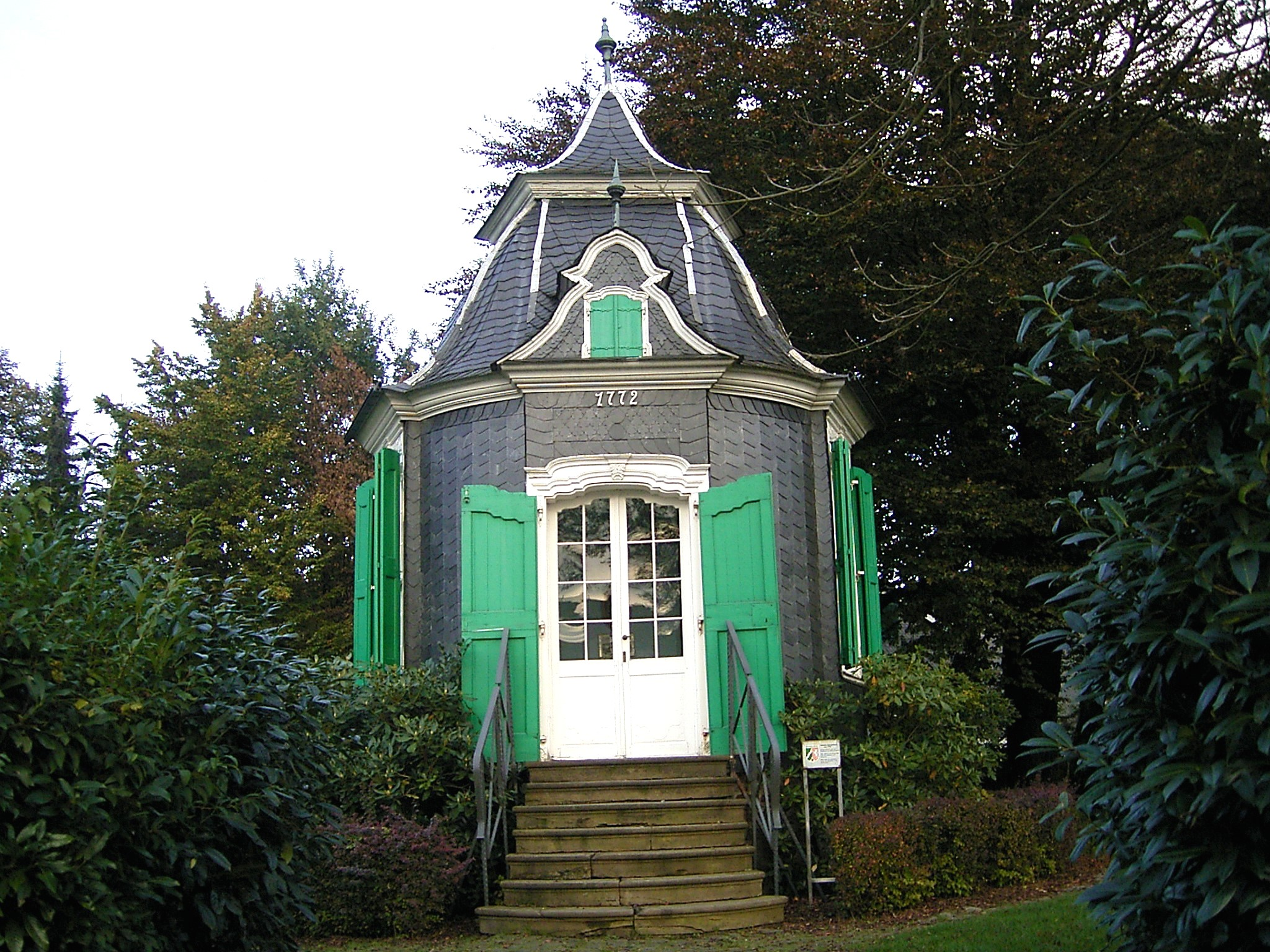
Historical rococo garden house

- Historical rococo garden house in the town park. Built in 1772, at the time of the town fire in 1802 it stood in front of the town wall approximately 200 m to the west of the future railway station and is the oldest building in the town. Its location today is not the original one: it was transferred to the town park in an improvement scheme.
- War Memorial at the Kollenberg
- War Memorial in the Froweinpark (moved to its current location in 1998 from its earlier position in the former sports field Herbeck)
- Commemorative cross for the victims of the 1971 train accident in the municipal cemetery Am Kreuz
- Moonstone in the Froweinpark as a memorial to the places submerged by the Wuppertal dam
- Commemorative tablet in the town hall for the victims of National Socialism
- Monument on the north side of Schlossmacherplatz for the twin town Châteaubriant in France
- Stone tablet to the entrepreneur and file manufacturer Frowein in the Froweinpark
- Ground monument Bergisch-Märkische Landwehr. Approximately indicating the border with Ennepetal and Breckerfeld, it is also thought once to have been the border between Saxony and Franconia.

=== Mills (including historic mills) ===
- Hees Mill (aka Lowest Mill). Today the earlier mill is used by a food company. Remains of the milling equipment still exist.
- Luhner Mill. No longer standing, it was in the immediate neighbourhood of the Leimholer Mill.
- Leimholer Mill. On the Uelfe brook; it takes its name from the place Leimhol.
- Lambecker Mill. About the mill itself nothing is known. The name Becke means a brook in Low German and is used in a large number of placenames in the region. The place Lambeck was mentioned in the year 1789 as Langenbeck (= long brook).
- Neuenhammer. This mill was a hammer works on the Uelfe brook. Only the placename and some buildings now used for trout breeding remain.
- Uppermost Mill. On the Uelfe brook. Today this affectionately-restored former mill is a food business.
- Stooter Mill. This was a flour mill on the Bever. It was registered 1828 in the ancient land register and was also called Stötermühle. In 1902 the mill was demolished for construction of the old Bevertal dam.
- Bird's Mill. No longer standing. In the year 1804 Vogelsmühle, a fulling mill, stood here, the precursor of the cloth industry later to develop.
- Wiebach Mill. The mill at the exit of the Wiebach valley was demolished 1956. Today the Wiebach dam, part of the Wuppertal dam system, floods the area.

=== Calendar of events ===
- Since 1948 the Radevormwald Cultural Circle has arranged a yearly program of cultural events, including stage plays, musicals, cabaret and concerts. These events take place in the Radevormwald Town Hall.
- The Radevormwalder Town Festival normally takes place on the first weekend in May.
- The Radevormwalder Fair, featuring a shooting match and a home festival is a regular feature of the Radevormwalder calendar.
- For some years a cycle race with well-known riders has taken place in summer in the downtown area.
- In September the traditional plum fair takes place.
- On the first weekend in October the cultural municipality organizes a traditional harvest festival in Önkfeld.

== Health services ==
The Johanniter (Knights Hospitaller) Hospital provides health services for the resident population.

== Notable people ==
- Franz Rudolf Bornewasser (1866–1951), archbishop of Trier, (1922–1951)
- Heide Rosendahl (born 1947), German athlete, sportswoman of the year 1970 and 1972
- Jürgen Fliege (born 1947), theologian, television presenter and journalist
- Fritz Hardt, entrepreneur and honorary citizen of the town (see also Wülfing Museum )
- Adolf von der Leyen (c. 1624–1698), entrepreneur, father of silk industry in Krefeld

== International relations ==
Radevormwald is twinned with:

- Châteaubriant - France, since 1981
- Nowy Targ - Poland
