= Head On =

Head On may refer to:

== Film and television ==
- Head On (1971 film), an American psychological drama film, written and directed by Edward J. Lakso
- Head On (1980 film), a Canadian drama film
- Head On (1998 film), an Australian LGBT-related romantic drama film
- Head-On (film), a 2004 German-Turkish drama film
- "Head-On" (Ballers), a 2015 television episode
- Head On, a fictional film in the Entourage universe

== Literature ==
- Head On (novel), a 2018 novel by John Scalzi
- Head On, a 2007 autobiography by Ian Botham
- Head-on, a 1994 autobiography by Julian Cope

== Music ==
- Head On (Bachman–Turner Overdrive album), 1975
- Head On (Bobby Hutcherson album), 1971
- Head On (Samson album), 1980
- Head On (Super Collider album), 1999
- Head On (Toronto album) or the title song, 1981
- Head On!, an EP by Ausgang, 1984
- "Head On" (song), by the Jesus and Mary Chain, 1989; covered by the Pixies, 1991

== Other uses ==
- Head On (video game), a 1979 arcade game by Sega
- Head On Photo Festival, an annual photography festival in Sydney, Australia
- Head-on maneuver (head-on attack), a type of attack maneuver in dogfighting
- Head-on collision, a type of vehicle collision
- HeadOn, a homeopathic product claimed to relieve headaches

== See also ==
- Headon (surname)
- Headon, Nottinghamshire, UK
