= Dudelange train collision =

2017 Luxembourg Train Accident

2017 Dudelange train collision
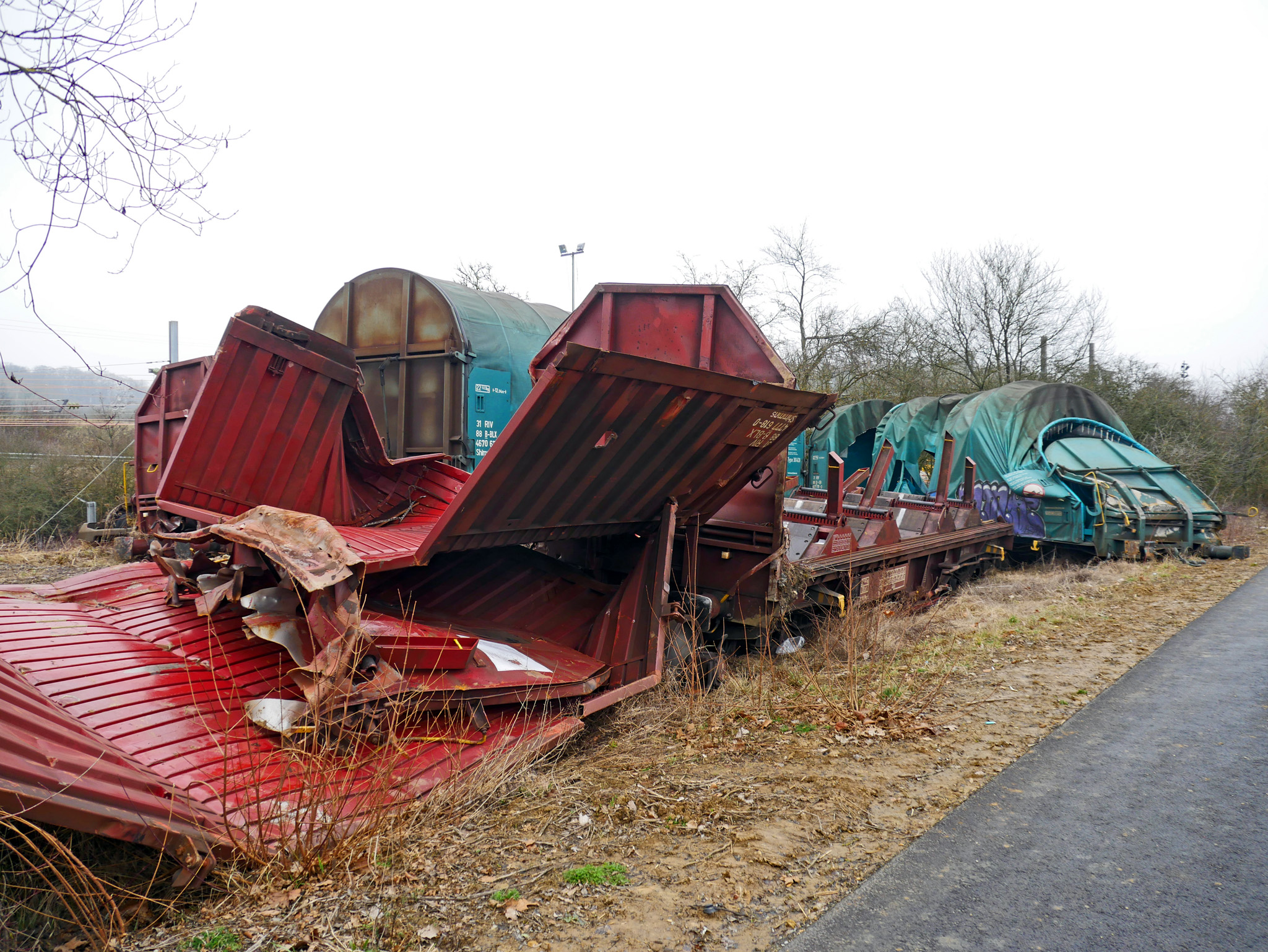
- Wagons destroyed in the accident

Details
- Date: 14 February 2017; 8:45
- Location: Dudelange
- Country: Luxembourg
- Line: CFL Line 60
- Operator: CFL, SNCB
- Incident type: Head-on collision

Statistics
- Trains: 2
- Deaths: 1
- Injured: 2

The 2017 Dudelange train collision occurred on the morning of 14 February 2017, near the town of Dudelange in Luxembourg, on the CFL Line 60 between Bettembourg and the French border. Two trains, a regional passenger train operated by the Chemins de Fer Luxembourgeois (CFL) and a freight train operated by the National Railway Company of Belgium, collided head-on after the driver of the Luxembourgish train failed to slow in time for a signal displaying a stop aspect. The driver of the passenger train died and two others were injured.

== Collision ==
The trains involved were a class 2200 electric multiple unit travelling from Luxembourg to Thionville, and a freight train consisting of two class 13 electric locomotives and 27 empty freight carriages.

That morning the passenger train had left Luxembourg station at 8:29, running 2 minutes late, on a journey to Thionville in France. At 8:42 it made a scheduled stop at Bettembourg, where all passengers disembarked before the train continued towards the French border.

The freight train had left Thionville that morning at 8:31, as part of a journey between Strasbourg to La Louvière.

At 8:44 the passenger train passed a caution signal approximately 1.5 km from the site of the collision. At that point the train was travelling at 123 km/h, and did not reduce its speed. It then passed another caution signal while traveling at 131 km/h. The driver had applied the train's brakes about two seconds earlier, 100m from the signal.

The freight train was crossing the tracks to enter the Bettembourg marshalling yard, having been given priority.

At 8:45 the freight train driver saw the approaching passenger train and ran out of the locomotive to take cover, seconds before the two trains collided. At the point of impact the passenger train was travelling at 85 km/h and the freight train at 41 km/h.

== Aftermath ==
The driver of the passenger train was killed instantly and a member of its crew sustained minor injuries. The driver of the freight train was seriously injured.

The leading locomotive of the freight train absorbed most of the energy of the impact and was completely destroyed, as was the leading unit of the passenger train. The remaining units of the passenger train, as well as the second locomotive and five of the freight wagons, were all badly damaged, while another six wagons were lightly damaged. The multiple unit and the two locomotives of the freight train were written off after the accident. Extensive damage was also done to the infrastructure, and almost all of the rails and signaling equipment needed to be replaced.

== See also ==
- The Zoufftgen train collision, which occurred in 2006 on the same stretch of tracks and similarly involved a Class 2200 EMU and a freight train
