= Zoufftgen train collision =

2006 railway incident in France

Coordinates: 49°28′19″N 6°6′28.4″E

2006 Zoufftgen train collision
- Area around the collision

Details
- Date: 11 October 2006; 11:45 am
- Location: Zoufftgen, Lorraine
- Country: France
- Line: Metz–Luxembourg railway, France
- Operator: CFL, SNCF
- Incident type: Head-on collision
- Cause: Human error – traffic controllers

Statistics
- Trains: 2
- Deaths: 6
- Injured: 20

The 2006 Zoufftgen train collision occurred around 11.45 am on 11 October 2006, near Zoufftgen, Moselle, France, some 20 metres (66 ft) from the border with Luxembourg, on the Metz–Luxembourg railway line. Two trains collided head-on while one track of a double track line was out of service for maintenance. Six people, including the drivers of both trains, were killed: two Luxembourgers and four French. Twenty more were injured in the collision, two seriously.

== Circumstances ==
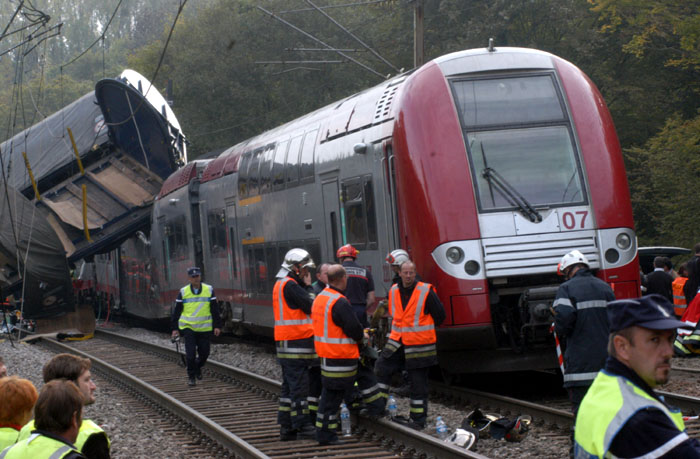
Aftermath of the collision

One train was a Class 2200 double-decker passenger train of the Chemins de Fer Luxembourgeois (CFL), running on the Métrolor service (TER Lorraine) from the city of Luxembourg to Nancy, France. The other was an SNCF freight train composed of 22 wagons on the Bâle – Thionville – Bettembourg route. They were involved in a head-on collision. This type of collision, called nez-à-nez ("Nose to Nose") in French railway jargon, is relatively rare and often fatal. One of the most fatal head-on collisions in France was the 1985 Flaujac train collision, which left 35 dead and 120 injured. The most recent collision of this kind happened on the Tende line on 27 January 2003 where a French and an Italian train collided, killing both drivers.

The collision occurred between the border stations of Hettange-Grande (France) and Bettembourg (Luxembourg), near the Lorraine area of Zoufftgen, on a double track section. The collision was on a section crossing a forest, limiting visibility. The speed limits of the trains were 140 km/h (87 mph) and 100 km/h (62 mph).

Only a single track was being used because of engineering works. The line was electrified at 25 kV AC, and equipped, between Thionville and Bettembourg, with BAL (bloc automatique lumineux, "automatic signal blocks") and IPCS (installation permanente de contre-sens, "permanent counter-track installations") which allow trains to run in one or other direction, the signalling and the interlocking being preconfigured to achieve this. Both trains were equipped with safety systems, KVB (contrôle de vitesse par balises, "Speed control by beacons") on the French side and Memor II+ on the Luxembourg side, which in particular halts the train if it passes a stop signal.

== Response ==
The préfecture of Moselle had made a "White plan" (an emergency plan) to organise the response. Hundreds of French and Luxembourgish rescue workers were marshalled:

- Around 100 police soldiers of the French National Gendarmerie,
- 150 French and Luxembourgish firefighters
- 50 emergency vehicles
- 7 French and Luxembourgish vehicle extrication units.

The "Red plan" was lifted two days after the collision, shortly after the sixth and last victim had been extricated.

== Investigations ==
=== Preliminary ===
According to the preliminary investigation, validated by the prefecture of the Department of Moselle and the Luxembourg authorities, the collision had caused:

- Six deaths, two Luxembourgers and four French, being the drivers and a worker on the adjacent track
- Two serious injuries (both French), removed to Thionville and Luxembourg for treatment
- Fourteen minor injuries or shock, treated in Thionville and Luxembourg.

=== Inquiries ===
The collision, having occurred in both France and Luxembourg, judicial inquiries were opened by the authorities in both Thionville and Luxembourg. At the same time, other inquiries were started: in France, by the SNCF and the BEA-TT (Bureau d’Enquêtes sur les Accidents de Transport Terrestre, "Land Transport Accident Investigation Bureau") by the French Minister of Transport, and in Luxembourg, by the CFL and the Entité d'Enquête d'Accidents et d'Incidents ("Inquiry Agency for Incidents and Accidents"), in concert with the BEA-TT.

On 8 October 2007, the court of the Grand Duchy of Luxembourg indicted six CFL employees on charges of manslaughter and actual bodily harm. After investigation, indictments of two board members of the CFL were dropped. While no individual has been identified, it was stated that among the accused were two traffic controllers.

=== Later ===
After further investigations by SNCF and CFL, railway officials came to the conclusion that the fault lay with the Luxembourg rail traffic controllers who cleared the passenger train onto the same track as the freight train. Luxembourg's Transport Minister Lucien Lux was quoted as saying "It's tough to say, but it's the fault of the CFL."

== Analysis ==
The Luxembourger driver of TER 837 617 received an order to pass a red (stop) signal to enter the zone operated by freight train number 45 938, pulled by SNCF Class BB 37000 locomotive 37007 from the Thionville depot, which had entered the section as normal by passing a green signal.

The collision was due to a human signalling error on the Luxembourg side, according to information from the Luxembourg Minister of Transport on 15 October 2006.

The CFL accepted that the double-deck passenger train (Class 2200), travelling from Luxembourg to Nancy, had passed a red signal with the authorisation of the head signaller at Bettembourg. The signaller had not followed procedure in its entirety, and had not confirmed with the signal box at Thionville that the way was clear, probably not considering the possibility of another train having been delayed (in fact, the freight train). The Bettembourg signal box thus authorised the TER train to proceed on the track past a red signal which had already cleared the freight train from the opposite direction.

Having realised the mistake, the signaller at Bettembourg triggered an alert by RST (Radio sol train, "Train Radio System"), which was not received by the driver of the passenger train. He then wanted to cut the electricity supply for the line, but this was not possible because of the different rail electrification systems of the two countries; moreover the Luxembourg train had already passed to the French side, and so was beyond the signaller's control.

=== Crumple zones ===
The Class 2200 rolling stock was extremely new (2004) and had crumple zones that progressively collapsed in the event of overriding (locomotive BB 37007 going under the CFL locomotive).

The cab of locomotive BB 37007 was destroyed by the force of the collision, but the rest of the leading structure remained "coherent". The crumple zone had been compressed. The driver, stuck in the cab, had no escape. The trailing wagons left the track to the right (in the direction of the train) after their couplings failed.

The head motor car of the CFL train, built on the same assembly line as the SNCF train, had had its cabin crushed by the force of the collision and the roof was torn off by the overriding locomotive; however the intermediate trailing wagons and the tail motor car remained on the track, because the ends of each of the cars in between had anti-override structures which "locked" against each other in case of shock. These structures led to the high number of survivors.

== See also ==
- List of rail accidents (2000–present)
- The Dudelange train collision, which occurred in 2017 on the same stretch of tracks and similarly involved a Class 2200 EMU and a freight train
