= SNCF Class Z 26500 =

Series of electric trains

Class Z24500/26500
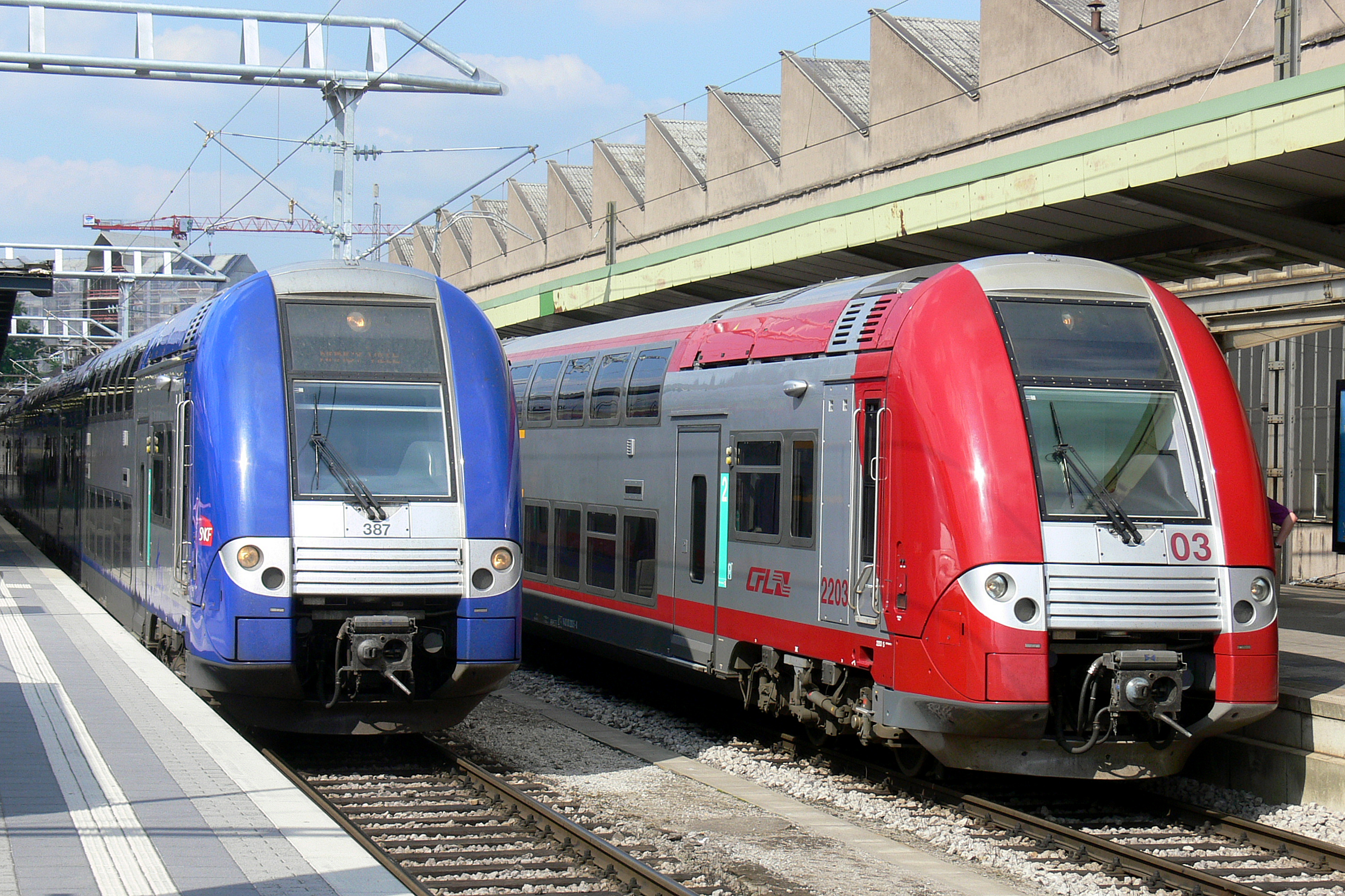
- Two TER 2N NG from SNCF and CFL at Luxembourg Station CFL
- In service: 2005–present
- Manufacturer: Alstom
- Family name: Coradia Duplex
- Constructed: 2004–2010
- Number built: 211 trainsets (723 vehicles)
- Number in service: 211
- Formation: 3, 4, 5 car per trainset
- Fleet numbers: 24501-24799/26501-26633
- Capacity: 339 (3 cars)/450 (4 cars)/570 (5 cars)
- Operator: SNCF
- Line served: TER

Specifications
- Train length: 81.1 m (266 ft 1 in) (3 cars); 107.5 m (352 ft 8 in) (4 cars); 133.9 m (439 ft 4 in) (5 cars)
- Width: 2.806 m (9 ft 2 in)
- Height: 4.30 m (14 ft 1 in)
- Doors: 2 doors per side
- Maximum speed: 160 km/h (100 mph)
- Weight: 193 t (3 car train)
- Traction system: Alstom IGBT VVVF
- Prime mover: 2 asynchronous motors 4 FXA 2851 by bogie
- Power output: 2,550 kilowatts (3,420 hp) (3 cars); 3,400 kilowatts (4,600 hp) (4 cars); 4,250 kilowatts (5,700 hp) (5 cars)
- Electric systems: Overhead line: 25 kV 50 Hz AC; 1,500 V DC
- Current collection: pantograph
- Braking systems: disc and electrodynamic
- Safety system: ETCS 1
- Coupling system: Scharfenberg type
- Multiple working: Z23500/24500/26500/2200 CFL
- Track gauge: 1,435 mm (4 ft 8 1/2 in)

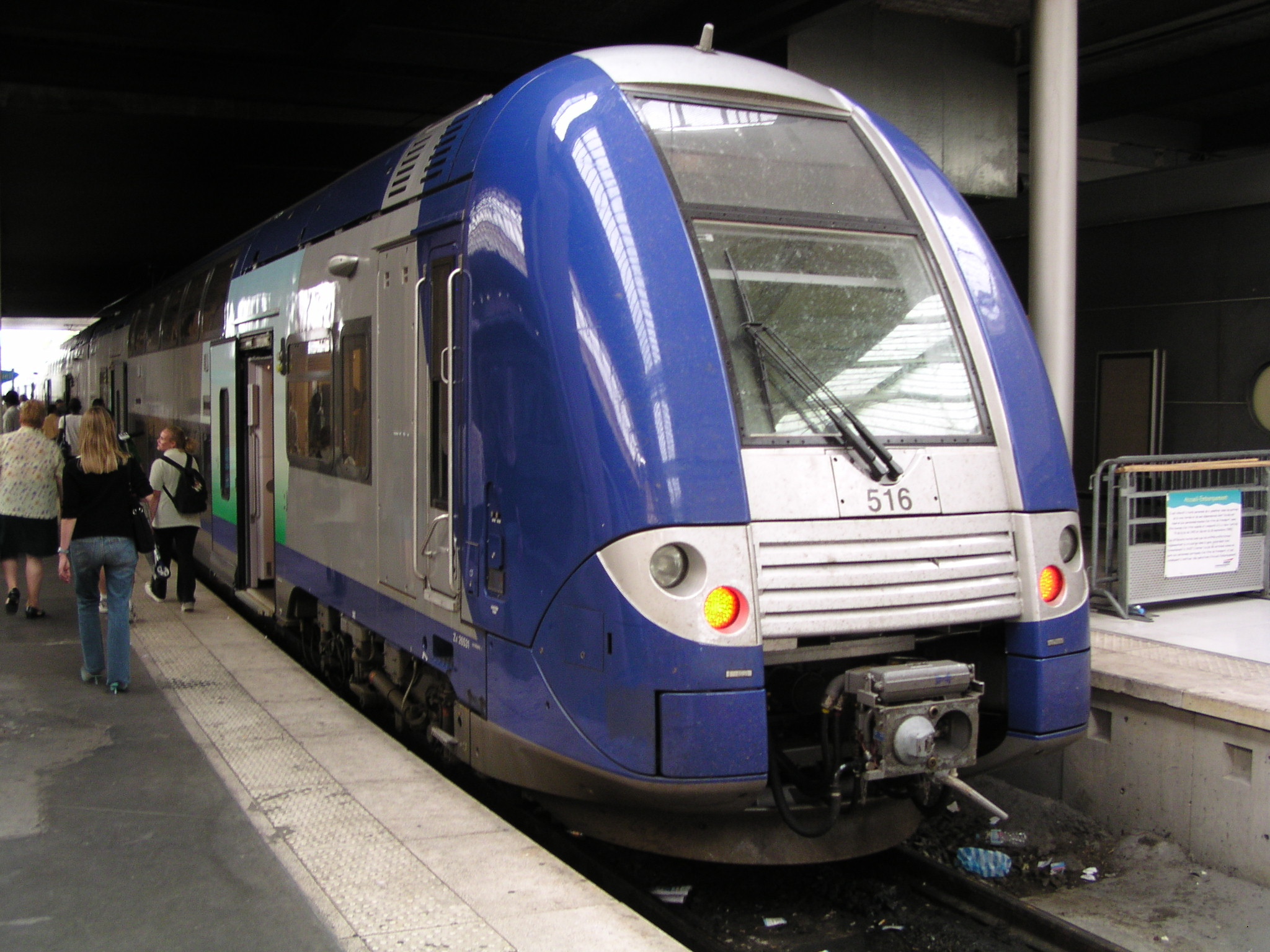
Z 26531 at Paris Gare du Nord on 5 September 2005.

The SNCF Class Z 26500 and Z 24500 are a series of electric multiple unit (EMU) trains with bi-level carriages, derived from the Coradia Duplex type of Alstom. They are also known as TER 2N NG from their use on regional TER services, bi-level design (2N), and, by replacing the SNCF Class Z 23500, status as a "new generation" (NG) model. The first order from SNCF, commissioned by the French regions, was launched in 2000, the last in 2009, for deliveries that lasted from 2004 to 2010.

SNCF distinguishes between the Z 24500 series with two or three cars, and Z 26500 series with four or five cars. Each car is powered by a twin-engine (850 kW per bogie).

The national railway company of Luxembourg (CFL) joined several orders from SNCF to buy 22 trains for its network, known as CFL Class 2200.

The SJ X40 series of the Swedish railways is also a version of the Z 24500 with features specific to the Swedish climate and network, the 43 trains are the first 100% bi-level trains used in Sweden.

== History ==
The success of the SNCF Class Z 23500 first generation two-level TER (TER 2N), as well as the significant need to renew the TER rolling stock, lead SNCF and the manufacturers to define a successor, but of an entirely new design. Indeed, the varied requirements of regions and travellers required the development of a flexible train able to be more accessible to people with reduced mobility (PRM), reach 160 km/h (100 mph) (compared to 140 km/h (90 mph) for TER 2N), cross the borders in the North-East 25 kV AC region, and be more comfortable for routes up to 2 h 30 min. It also needed to offer a variety of passenger areas and be subject to enhanced passive safety, meeting the latest regulations in force. Alstom used its Coradia platform to offer new equipment, a full-scale model of which was assembled in 2002 and then presented to the public and communities to validate the choices of interior fittings.

A first contract of 629 carriages forming 72 trainsets of different configurations was issued in November 2000 on behalf of six regions: Picardie (eight 5-car trains), Provence-Alpes-Côte d'Azur (ten 4-car trains), Centre (seven 4-car trains), Nord-Pas-de-Calais (sixteen 3-car trains), Lorraine (fifteen 3-car trains), Rhône-Alpes (eleven 2-car trains). In addition, the Luxembourg railways (CFL) acquired twelve 3-car trainsets, intended to be pooled with those of the neighboring Lorraine region.

Originally, there were eleven two-car train Z 24500s that the Rhône-Alpes region had purchased in 2000, during the first order. In April 2003, eleven intermediate carriages were ordered to increase these sets from two to three car. The Rhône-Alpes region was the only one to have ordered TER 2N NG with two cars, there are none today.

Ten successive amendments, signed between April 2003 and January 2009, allowed regions to complete their stock, or new regions to place orders; they also allow the Rhône-Alpes region to order intermediate boxes in order to form only 3-car train elements instead of the 2-car train initially planned. Only the Brittany region, initially interested, did not follow up. These amendments brought the total of orders to 791 carriages forming 233 trainsets, with two carriages being ordered by CFL in order to reform a complete train set after the Zoufftgen rail accident in October 2006.

== Design ==
The TER 2N NG trains were named by SNCF according to their configuration: Z 24500 for the two and three car trainsets and Z 26500 for the four and five car sets. Their Luxembourg counterparts have been named 2200 series.

All these elements are identical. They can travel in multiple with the first generation Z 23500 TER 2N trains. These trainsets are particularly suited to busy inter-city or dense peri-urban services and are suitable for speeds of 160 km/h (100 mph), thanks to their motorization distributed over the whole train, with one motor bogie and one carrier bogie per car.

== Gallery ==
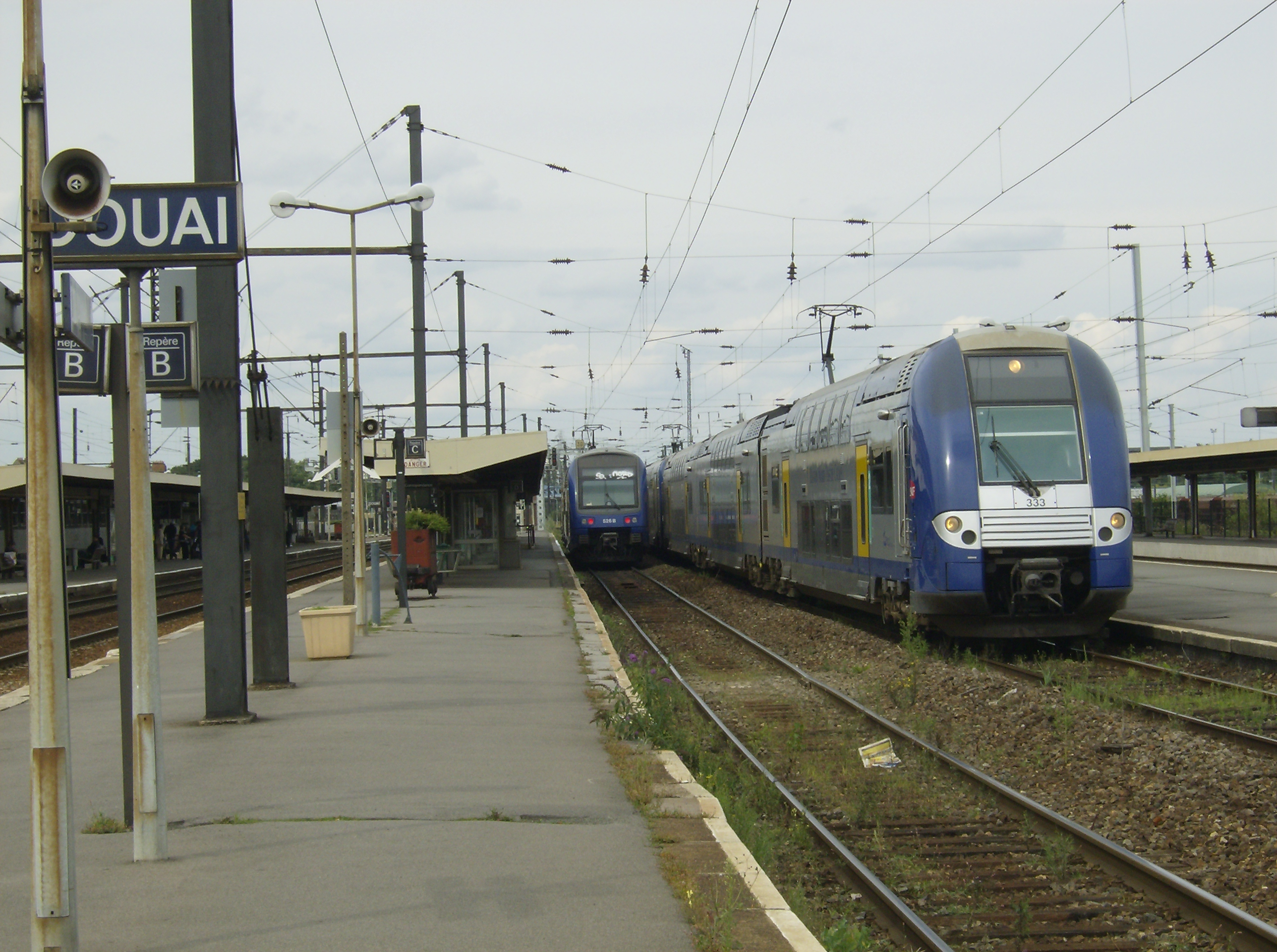
Two Double Deck sets at Gare de Douai

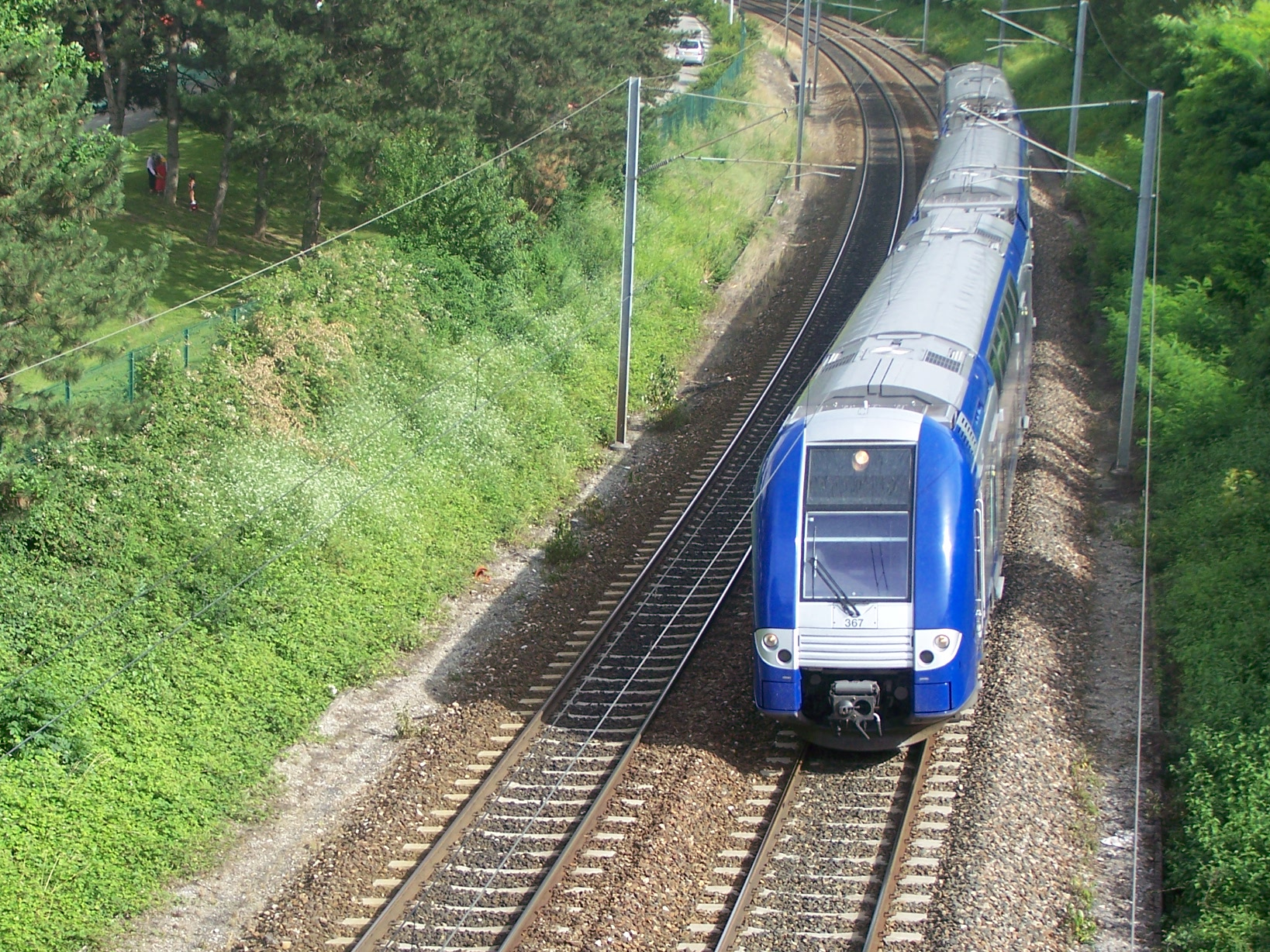
A TER service to Lyon near Grenoble

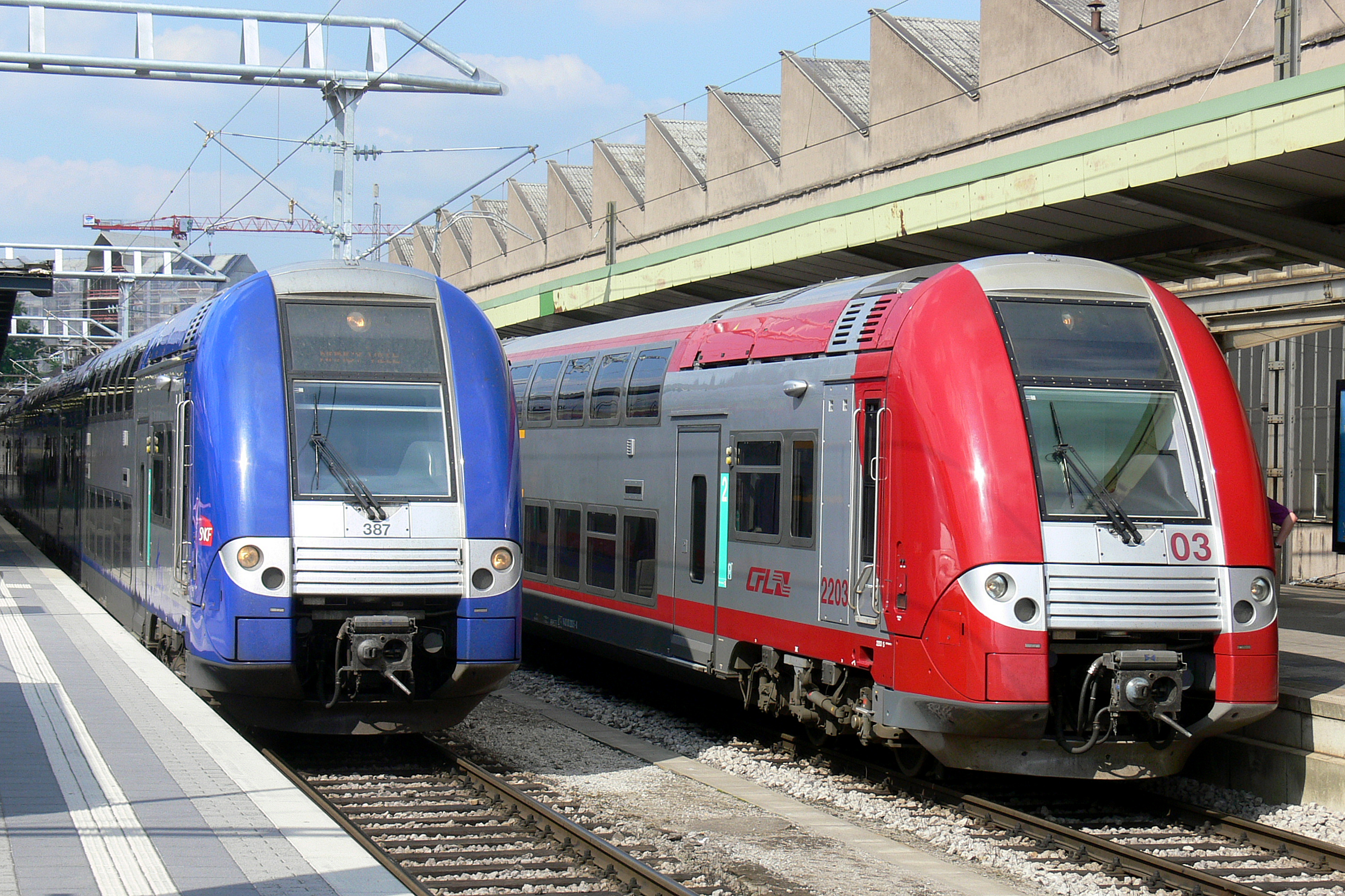
Two trains (SNCF and CFL) at Luxembourg railway station
