= Super Collider (band) =

British electronica group

Super_Collider
- Origin: England
- Genres: Electronica
- Years active: 1998–2002
- Labels: Loaded Records
- Members: Jamie Lidell; Cristian Vogel

Super_Collider were an English electronic duo consisted of Jamie Lidell and Cristian Vogel, formed in 1998. They released two albums – Head On in 1999, and Raw Digits in 2002.

This band should not be confused with the Los Angeles–based "post-rock" band of the early 1990s, Supercollider (Emigre Label).

== Discography ==
- Head On (1999)
- Raw Digits (2002)
