= CFL Class 2200 =

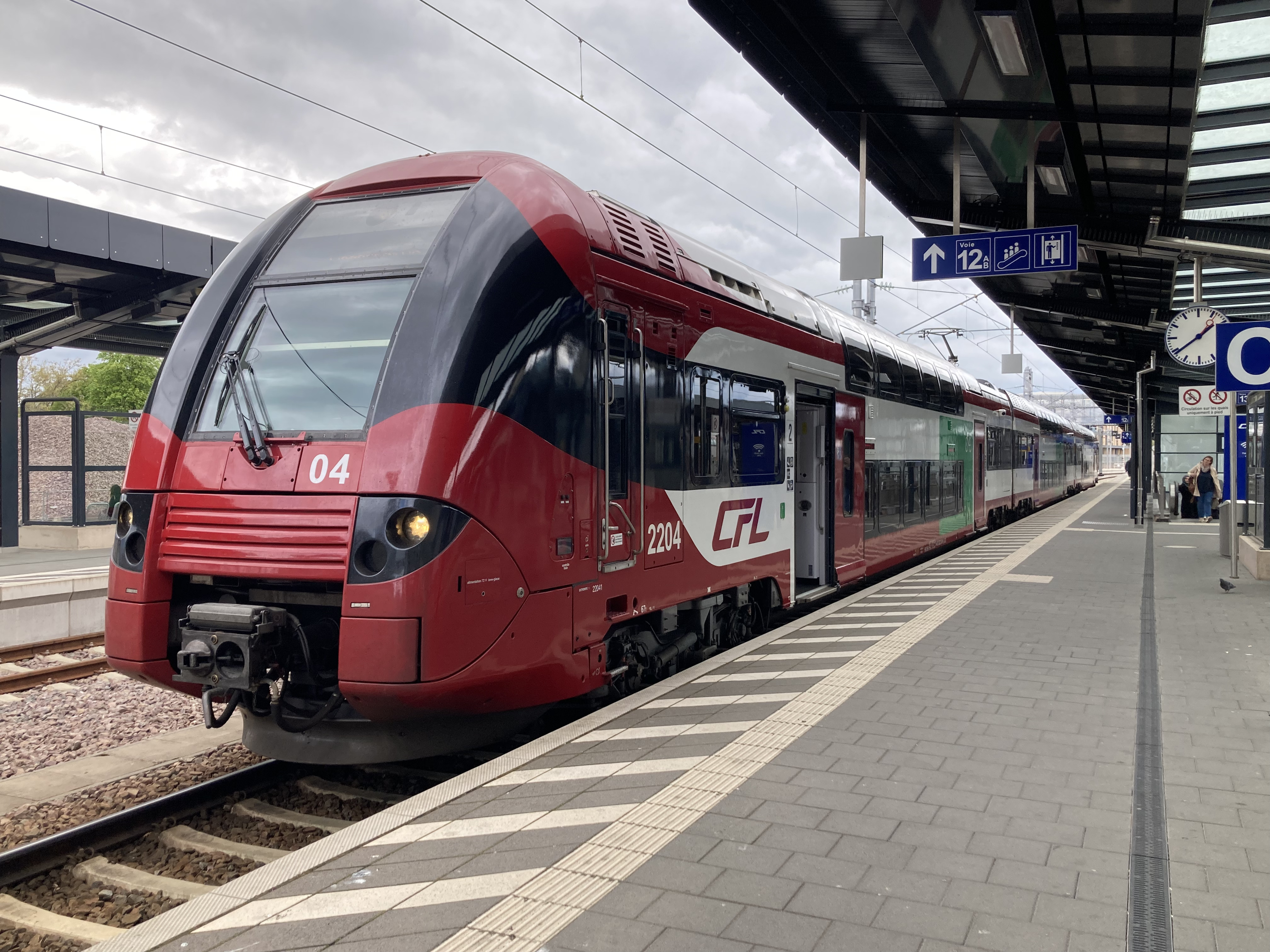
- A CFL Class 2200 at Luxembourg railway station.

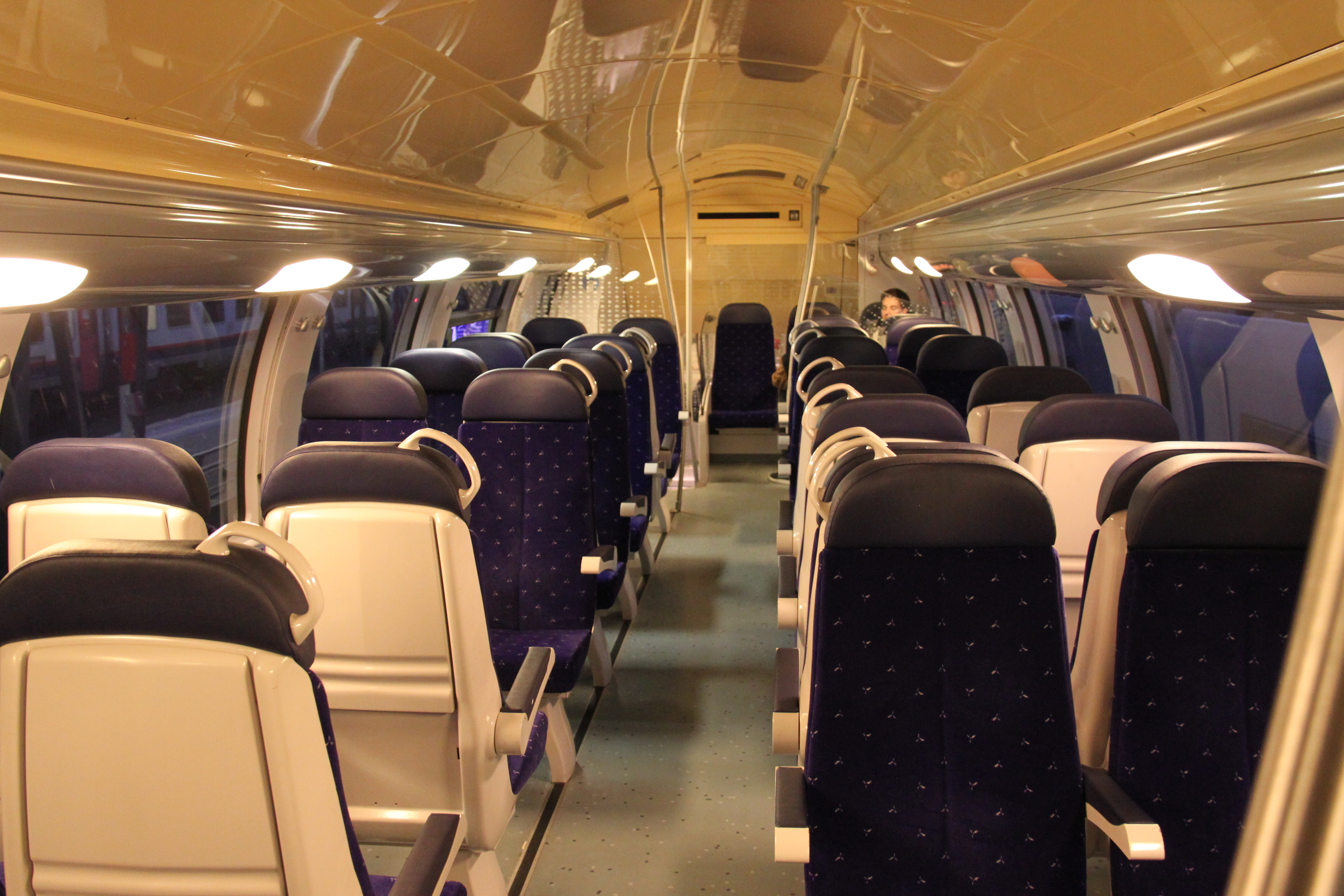
- Second class interior
- In service: 2005 - Present
- Manufacturer: Alstom
- Family name: Coradia Duplex
- Constructed: 2004-2006, 2009-2010
- Number built: 22 trainsets (66 vehicles)
- Number in service: 22
- Formation: Z1+Z3+Z5
- Fleet numbers: 2201-2223
- Capacity: 339
- Operators: CFL

Specifications
- Train length: 81.1 m (266 ft 1 in)
- Width: 2.806 m (9 ft 2 in)
- Height: 4.30 m (14 ft 1 in)
- Doors: 12
- Articulated sections: 3
- Maximum speed: 160 km/h (99 mph)
- Weight: 193 t
- Power output: 2,340 kilowatts (3,140 hp)
- Electric system(s): 1.5 kV DC/25 kV AC overhead lines
- Current collection: pantograph
- Safety system(s): ETCS 1
- Track gauge: 1,435 mm (4 ft 8 1/2 in) standard gauge

CFL Class 2200 is a series of electric multiple units built by Alstom for CFL. The trains are similar to the French SNCF Class Z 26500.

In 2006, EMU 2207 collided head-on with a freight train in the Zoufftgen train collision, resulting in 6 deaths. Damaged parts of the train were removed and replaced by new sections. This train was renumbered into 2223.

== Interior ==
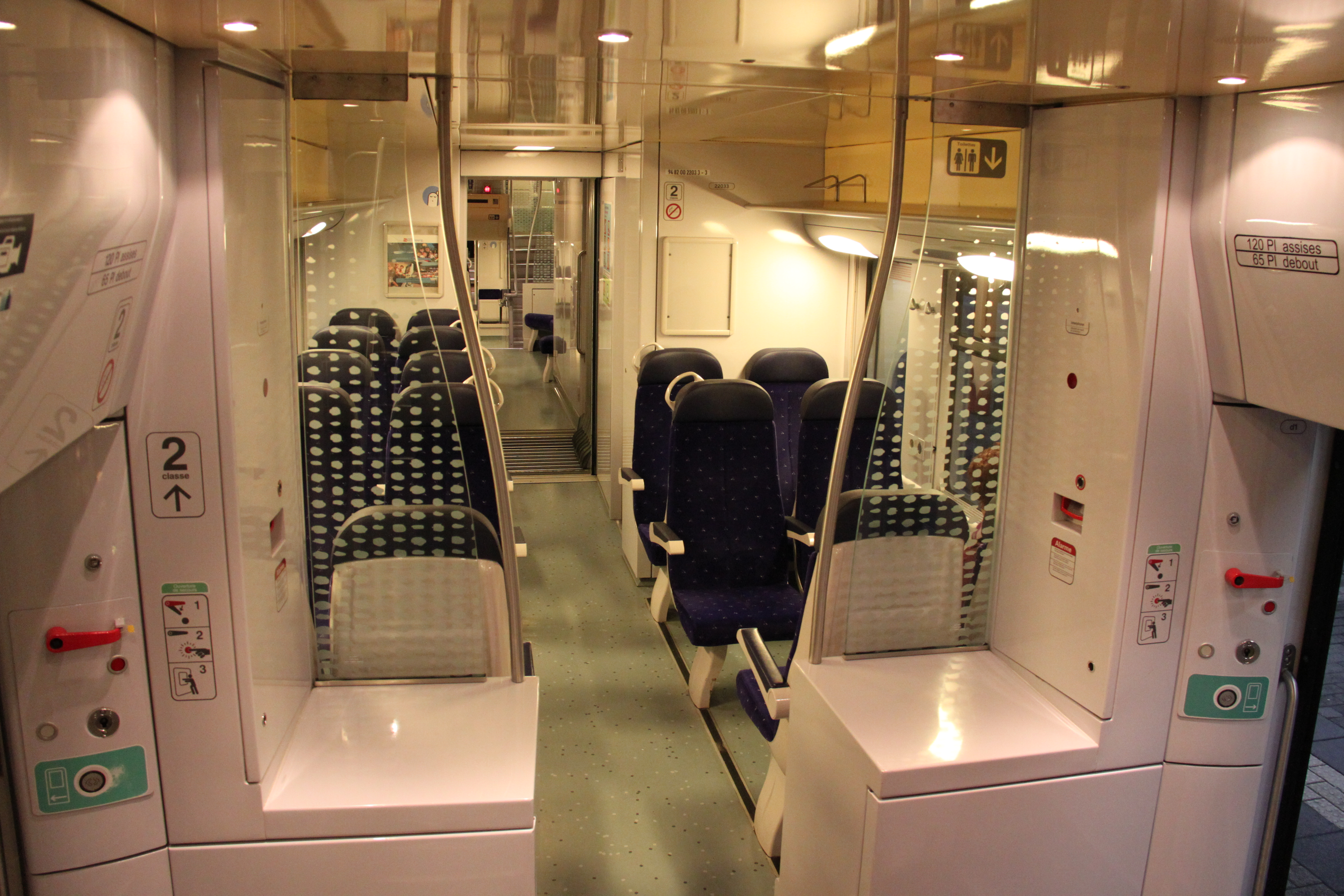
Balcony and Second class section

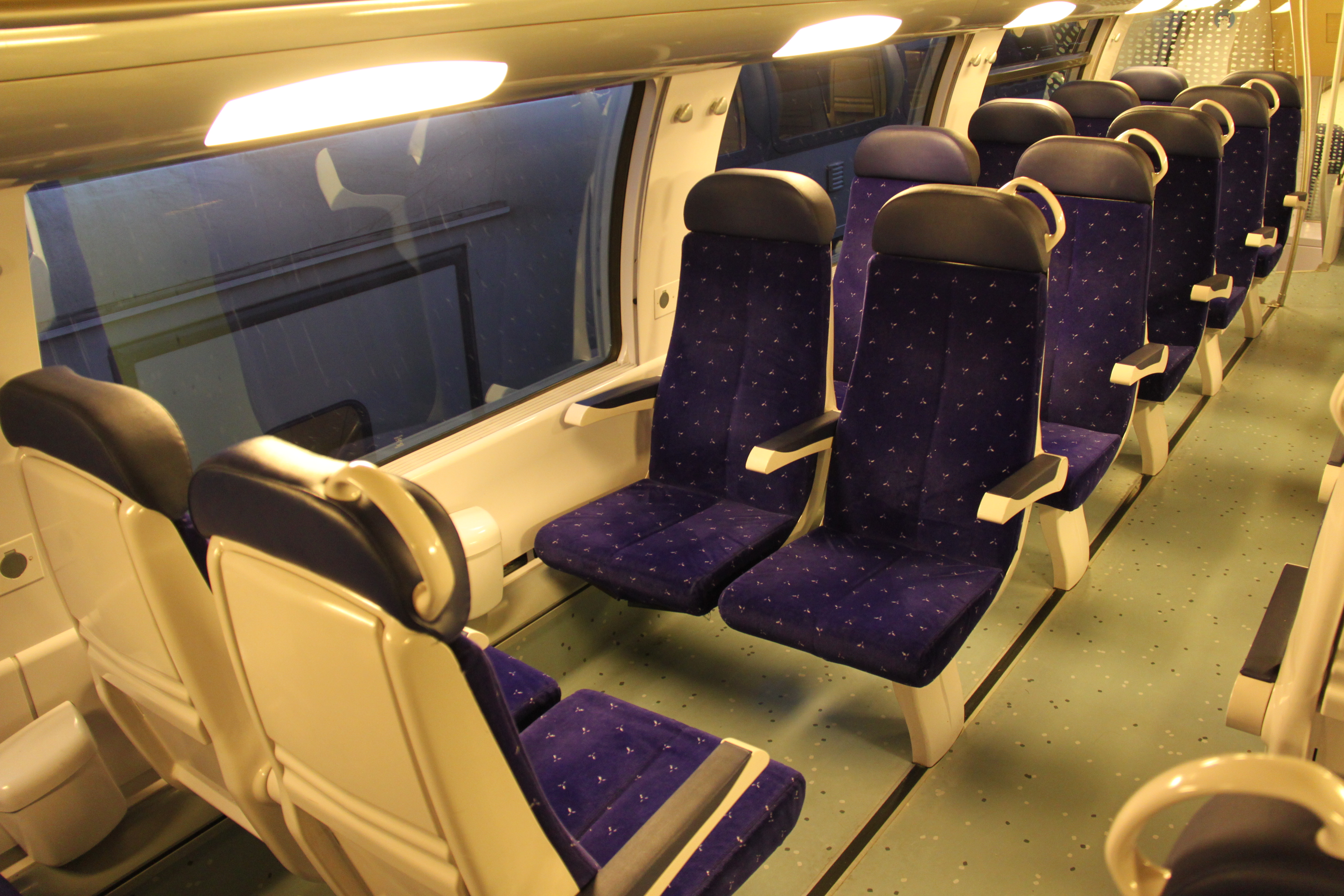
Second class seats

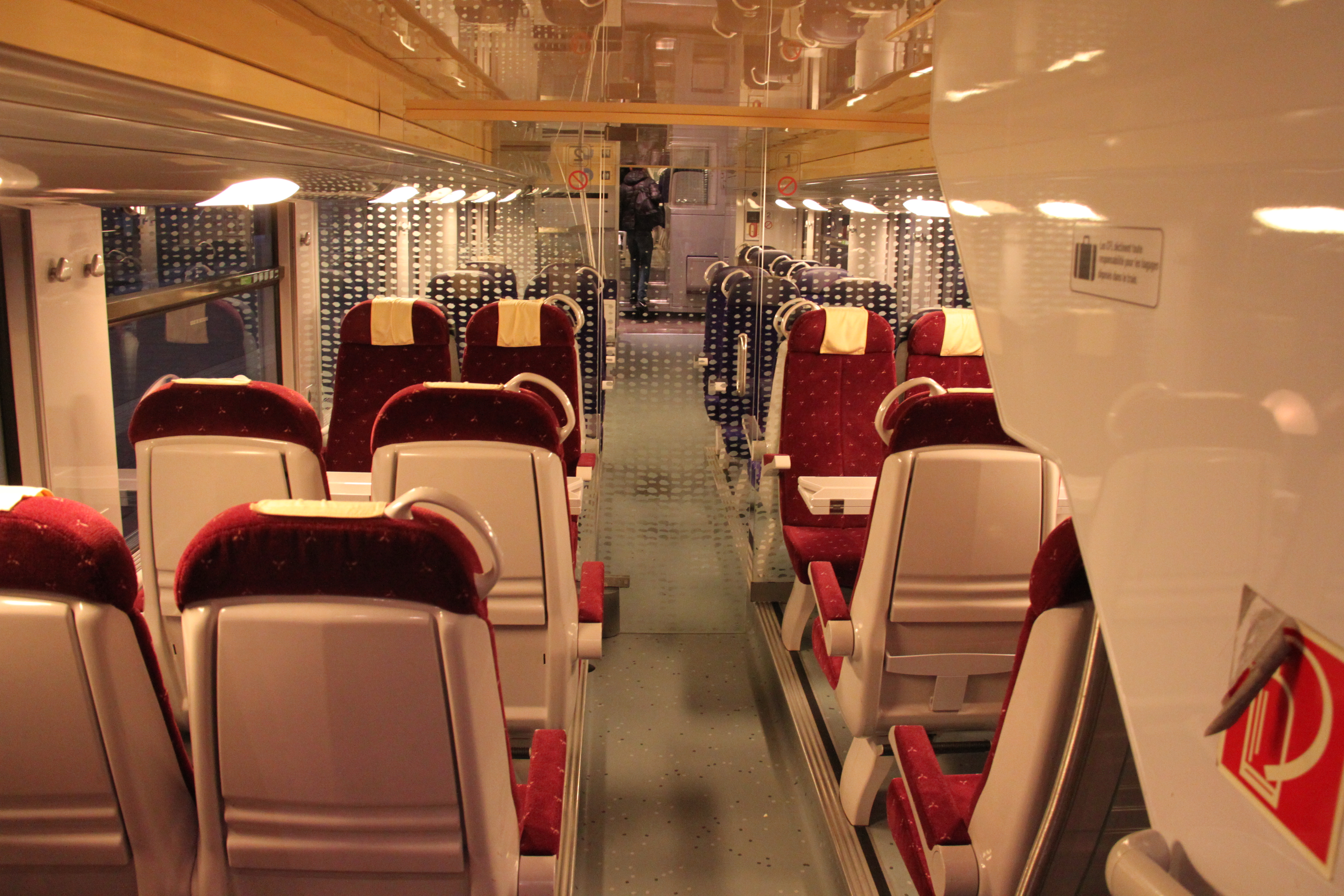
First class
