= Head On (Super Collider album) =

Studio album by Super_Collider
- Released: 24 May 1999
- Recorded: Brighton
- Genre: Techno; experimental; funk; house; dance-pop; P-funk; IDM
- Length: 53:46
- Label: Loaded
- Producer: Cristian Vogel; Jamie Lidell

Super_Collider chronology
Head On (1999)	Raw Digits (2002)

Singles from Head On
- 1. "Darn (Cold Way O' Lovin')" Released: 1998; 2. "It Won't Be Long/Take Me Home" Released: 1999

Head On is the debut album by English-based electronic duo Super Collider, consisting of producers Cristian Vogel and Jamie Lidell. It was released in May 1999 by Loaded Records. The collaboration emerged in 1998 when the two producers began sharing the same studio in Brighton and soon began creating music together. Their initial work together produced the songs "Under My Nose" and "Darn (Cold Way O' Lovin')", both included on the album, but believing them to be too stylistically orthodox, the duo pursued a more distinctive sound for the remaining material.

Taking influence from funk music, in particular the music of Sly Stone, Head On is an experimental techno record that combines Vogel's abstract production with the funk influences and Lidell's soulful but effects-heavy singing. Co-produced by the duo, the album received acclaim from music critics, who drew attention to its influences and production. "It Won't Be Long" and "Take Me Home" were issued together as a double A-side single.

== Background ==
In the late 1990s, electronic musician Jamie Lidell began sharing a studio in Brighton with Chilean minimal techno producer Cristian Vogel after they discovered they admired one another's music. They began making music together in 1998, formalising their partnership as Super_Collider, while Lidell began developing his skills as a soul singer when jamming on stage with Balzac. While working on what later became "Under My Nose", Lidell initially screamed the song's vocals. In Lidell's recollection, his girlfriend, who was with him in the studio, advised him to soften his vocal style. He took her advice and began "just scatting along really and just responding to the track." When Lidell cut the vocal up and incorporated a groove, Vogel approved of his work-in-progress, and after editing work, it became Super_Collider's first song. Another work-in-progress, "Darn (Cold Way O' Lovin)", remained an instrumental until Lidell added vocals one night which he had recorded a year earlier for a live show in Vogel's Brighton club Defunkt.

Pairing Lidell's vocal with a funk style at a house tempo, "Darn (Cold Way O' Lovin') was released in 1998 as the first Super_Collider single alongside a remix by DJ Harvey, and was lauded by both critics and DJs. Though pleased with the positive reception, Vogel expressed concerns in a 1999 interview that audiences would not appreciate the duo's following material, which they planned to be "nothing like that single" and instead "perhaps more progressive and innovative and challenging for the way we work," commenting that the single was "quite orthodox" in comparison. He nonetheless explained that "['Darn'] will always have a special place in my heart. I heard some people say some incredible things to me personally and I got some compliments that I'll remember forever." Super_Collider signed with Loaded Records – known for releasing more commercial-style music – largely due to their offices being geographically close. They played the label "Darn", unsure which labels would enjoy it due to its unusual style, but Loaded enjoyed the single and made them an offer to record an album.

== Production ==
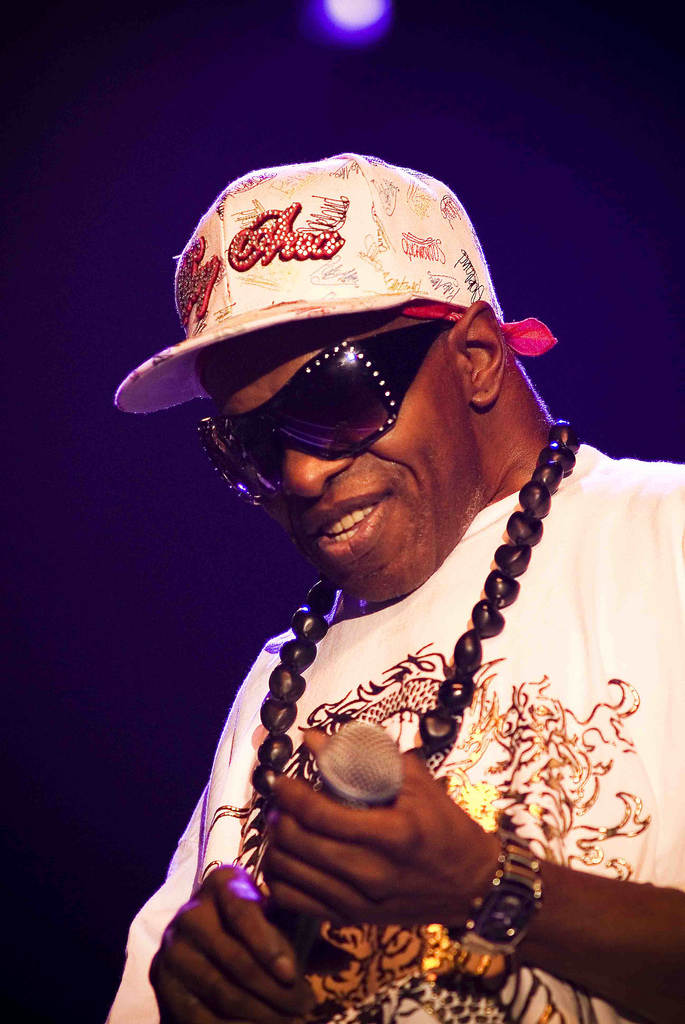
Sly Stone (pictured 2007), Jamie Lidell's biggest influence on Head On.

Vogel and Lidell wrote and produced Head On together. The only songs the duo had already created were "Under My Nose" and "Darn", which they considered "really commercial tracks" made for fun, but according to Lidell, they chose to pursue other ideas for the album instead of continuing in "making a kind of variant on house music", which they considered "Darn" to represent. He recalled: "As you can imagine, given that you're signed on the basis of a couple of tracks, there's a slight risk to sign someone having only that and not having heard their potential range of sounds." Contrary to belief that Lidell contributed only vocals to Vogel's backing tracks, the latter said their collaboration was "a lot more complicated than that." Vogel felt that, while working on Head On, Lidell introduced him to "lots of the old ways that I've missed out on. But similarly, we absolutely adore brand spanking new exciting hard music." Both producers played a lot of older music during production; Vogell said that, for him, this was as he was tired of his techno record collection and wanted to listen to music he "could actually get into and pay attention to and listen to properly."

The duo chose to fuse modern electronic sounds with influences of funk music, in particular Sly Stone, Lidell's biggest musical inspiration. "In a Desert Island sort of test," he said, "I'd always take Sly Stone above any electronic music. He's one of my favourite artists, just because he seemed to have almost the perfect balance between fun–he even wrote a song called 'Fun'–and music and community and so much shit there in the mix." Though not comparing their music to Stone, Lidell said his influence was "so strong" and aimed to create melodies "but without the trappings of having to make traditional songs." He explained in an interview that Head On took long to create due to the "sheer amount of editing which needs to be done because of how many ideas end up being generated from two heads. Under the influence of a bit of cannabis and a good couple of record collections, you get a serious list of potential recipes." According to The Wire, the album was largely a digital construction, described by Lidell as a "meticulous soundworld." Most of the duo's song structures were achieved by excessive, painstaking "software tweaks and hard disk editing."

== Composition ==
"Though his experimental bent is well-known, Vogel's solo productions rarely forsake the almighty beat and thankfully, it's no different here. The old-school electro beatbox is in full effect, and while that usually makes for a stark quality to any throwback affair, Vogel and Lidell throw so many goofball effects and percussion detritus into the mix that most of the tracks here sound positively beefy."

—John Bush of AllMusic

Head On is an album of experimental, "skewed" dance-pop material, comprising songs which mash up "P-funk and Prince-styled vocals into an electro-shedder similar to the one employed by Autechre and Oval," according to critic John Bush. While central to the sound are unusual funk grooves, melodies and Lidell's soulful vocals, the record's unique techno production, combining surreal sound textures, fitful drum programming and 'murky' sub-bass tones, result in what critic M. Tye Comer described as "a mutant strain of music that embraces P-Funk, house and techno without subscribing to the rules of any pre-existing genre." Simon Reynolds felt that Vogel's "decidedly mangled and alienated" production, as had been seen on his avant-garde techno solo releases, was reworked on Head On to unusually incorporate synth bass and keyboard licks reminiscent of the SOS Band, D Train and the Gap Band, in keeping in with the album's funk sound. He described Lidell's "grotesquely mannered, FX-warped" vocals as "a kind of cyborg hypersoul".

"Cut the Phone" is a fusion of cut-up R&B and keyboards, while "Darn (Cold Way O' Lovin)" features soulful vocals largely repeating the title while low-end "tech-basslines" weave in and out of the track and switching between left and right channels. According to Bush: "The message is clear: vocals are just another sound-source to be tweaked and spun off in all directions." Described by Reynolds as "robo-Cameo" due to its synthesised slap bass sounds, "Take Me Home" is a rhythmic soul song with similarities to Prince. It was described by the NME as, "in fact, in a small but significant way, unlike anything else, ever." "It Won't Be Long" is a drowsy P-funk song, while "Alchemical Confession" is characterised by its heavy usage of "acrid guitar squalls."

== Release ==
With artwork by Red Design and incorporating photography from Ben Cowlin, the album cover features a composite conflation of Vogel and Lidell's heads, pasted from "scores of digital flakes." Their bleary eyes and haggard expression was described by Bush as attesting to the album's physically straining production. Head On was initially released by Loaded Records on 24 May 1999 in the United Kingdom, before being made available on 9 November 1999 in the United States on Skint Records, a big beat label for whom Loaded is a subsidiary. The original CD release contains bonus tracks as MP3 content. A limited-edition version was also released in Britain, adding a bonus disc containing four extra tracks. "It Won't Be Long" and "Take Me Home" were released as a double A-side after having become popular in British clubs. During the promotion of the album, Vogel expressed annoyance at Loaded insisting that all the duo's releases contain remixes, and often found they did not know about or care for half the remixers the label suggested. In February 2000, Melody Maker included Head On a list of "the most unpopular records," based on reports of albums sold to second-hand shops.

== Critical reception and legacy ==
Professional ratings
Review scores
Source	Rating
AllMusic	4.5/5 stars
Buckingham Advertiser	3/5 stars
Spin	9/10

On release, Head On received wide acclaim from music critics. Simon Reynolds of Spin felt the album picks up "where Zapp's 'More Bounce to the Ounce' and George Clinton's 'Atomic Dog' left off–the era of dance music when trad musicianship crashed head-on into futurism." He praised the album's inventive sound and concluded that, unlike other bands, Super_Collider proved they "have a perfect grasp on funk's uncanny merger of supple and stiff, loose and tight." He further described the song "Alchemical Confession" as "the kind of black rock I always hoped Tackhead or Material would deliver." In a positive review, M. Tye Comer of CMJ New Music Monthly described Head On as "[a] very strange and titillating release," writing that it "lives up to every connotation of the word 'experimental'." They recommended the tracks "Darn", "Take Me Home", "Cut the Phone" and "Pay It Away".

John Bush of AllMusic named Head On an "Album Pick", praising how the "positively beefy" production enhances the album's "delightfully skewed dance-pop." He commented: "True, there's a lot to digest -- and perhaps a bit too much production in several spots -- for a collection of 'pop' songs, but fans of the Skam label and the Mask series will eat this stuff up. Best of all, now there's an outside chance that a Vogel production will get played on the world's less intellectual dancefloors." In a review of the "It Won't Be Long" and "Take Me Home" double A-side, Piers Martin of the NME described Head On as an "exceptional" album, and described Super_Collider as "[u]narguably one of the most inventive and mind-bendingly exciting groups currently functioning in pop." A reviewer for Buckinghamshire Advertiser called it "one of the most ambitious dance albums of the year so far." However, they criticised the decision to add "compressed audio files" as bonus content, feeling they should have been included as regular tracks. In Techno: The Rough Guide, writer Tim Barr described the album as "House-wrecking."

Les Inrockuptibles ranked the album at 45 in their year-end list of the best albums of 1999, while The Wire named it one of the year's 10 best electronica albums. In 2014, Fact magazine included "It Won't Be Long" at number 66 in their list of "The 100 greatest IDM tracks", and commented on the album's continued appeal: "So very, very far ahead of its time, Super_Collider's first album Head On [amazingly] arrived on a major label thanks to Skint's deal with Sony. Cristian Vogel and Jamie Lidell hit a rich seam of dark cyborg funk, that wraps itself around you like the hungry metal in Tetsuo. For those who only know Jamie Lidell as the slick lounge lizard soulman he later became, his singing and production work on this should be a revelation." In a 2005 interview with Pitchfork, Lidell reflected upon Head On fondly as an "innovative" and "mindblowing" album, describing it as "a big wake-up call to a lot of people. We were really trying to rip people's heads off, and we didn't have much technology to do that." The Wire magazine felt that Lidell's mid-2000s soul music could be rooted back to Head On.

== Track listing ==
All songs written by Cristián Vogel and Jamie Lidell

1. Cut the Phone" – 3:41
2. Darn (Cold Way o' Lovin')" – 5:57
3. Hide in from the Day – 5:30
4. It Won't Be Long – 5:28
5. Pay It Away" – 5:37
6. Under My Nose" – 5:54
7. Close to a Change" – 4:07
8. Take Me Home" – 6:06
9. Alchemical Confession" – 4:09
10. You Loosen Me Human" – 7:11

=== Bonus MP3 content ===
1. "Dawn (Dawn of Lidell Mix)" – 4:32
2. "Take Me Home (Walpole Dub)" – 6:35

== Personnel ==
Adapted from the liner notes of Head On

- Cristián Vogel – writing, production
- Jamie Lidell – writing, production
- Ben Cowlin – photography
