= French railway signalling =

The current French railway signalling system is in force on the Réseau Ferré de France (now SNCF Réseau) since 1930, when the code Verlant was applied.

== History ==
Historically, each private railway company designed and used its own signals. However, during the First World War the interpenetration of trains between networks had increased, so that it became necessary to create a new unified signals specification. A commission was set up in May 1926, directed by Eugène Verlant of the PLM.

The Verlant commission submitted its report at the end of 1927. The new code of signals received the approval of the Ministry of Public Labour on 1 August 1930. Conversion to the Verlant code was completed only at the end of 1936, except on the network of Alsace-Lorraine where it was completed later, because of the unusual pre-existing signalling.

The Verlant code was very innovative, based on simple principles:

- Mainly based on color light signalling, which thereafter simplified the installation of the automatic block signalling.
- Light signals used three basic colors: red (stop), yellow (to announce stop or limited speed), green (clear). This color code was already applied by many foreign companies. It was also used for traffic lights.
- Simplification: it presented only the most imperative indications (except in special cases).

== Placement of signals ==
Signals are normally placed on the side of the line: on the left if the trains run on the left. However, in the Départements of Bas-Rhin, Haut-Rhin and Moselle, trains normally run on the right and so signals are placed on the right. This area was part of Germany from 1870 to 1918; trains run on the right in Germany and the railways were built during that period. When the area became French again in 1918, the railway network was almost complete, and trains ran on the right. Reversing the direction would be too expensive, in particular for interlocking, so circulation and signals remained on the right.

In several stations and on several line sections, when the local layout requires it, signals can be set on the right. They are then equipped with a white arrow indicating the way to which they are addressed.

On some double-track line sections equipped with "permanent counter-track installations" (IPCS), signals are placed normally on the right for counter-track circulations. No white arrows are used. In fact, entering the wrong way is confirmed by a luminous counter-track entrance board (TECS), which, when lit, indicates that the following signals are placed on the right (on the left for Alsace and Moselle). Similarly, a counter-track exit board (TSCS) indicates the return to normal running, with signals placed on the normal side.

Where trains run on the left, the hand-held stop signals (red flag, stop marker or lantern with red light) are presented on the left or at the center of the relevant track. If there is a platform by the track, they can be presented on the side of the platform.

If ground space is limited or risk obstructing trains, the signal can be mounted on a gantry. Additionally, if there isn't enough space on the left, it can be placed on the right side with a white arrow pointing to the track that it serves. This scenario is also possible with gantry signals, in which, the signal on the gantry has an arrow that points to the track that it serves, equivalent on ground.

== Permissiveness and aspects ==
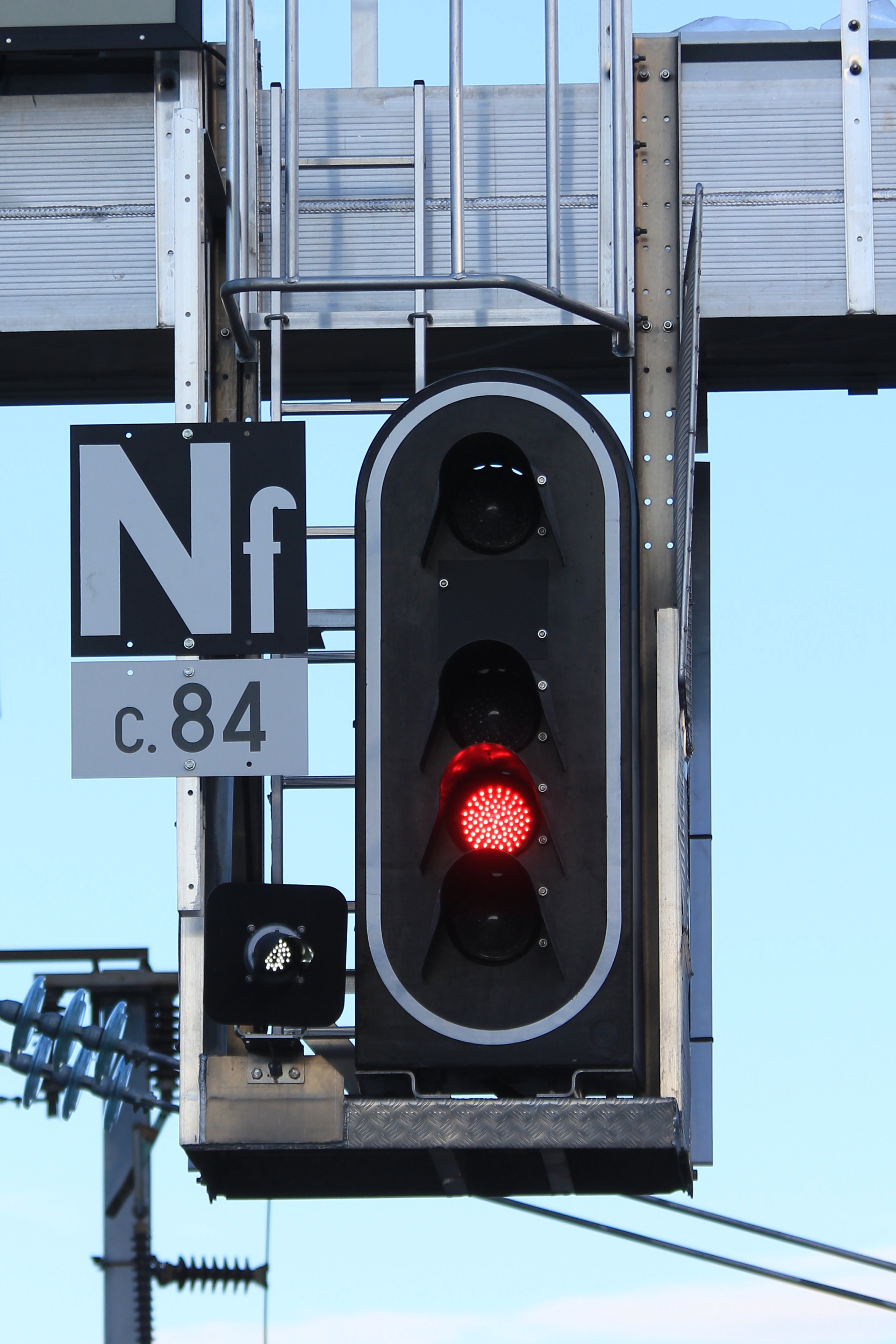
A non-permissive signal ("Nf") can temporarily become permissive, in which case the œilleton is lit.

In automatic block signalling, the signalling device is generally one of three categories:

- Non-permissive signals are absolute signals; they protect routes or points, or delimit sidings. Such signals can be recognized by their "Nf" (Non-franchissable, Non-passable) plate. In their most restrictive aspect, they cannot be passed except under exceptional circumstances;
- Permissive signals regulate traffic to prevent trains from rear-ending the next one ahead. They bear plates such as "F" (Franchissable, Passable) or "PR" (Permissivité restreinte, Restricted Permissiveness). Non-permissive signals can also temporarily become permissive, in such case their "Nf" plate is accompanied with a small white light (Œilleton). The most restrictive aspect of a permissive signal allows the train to proceed after a certain number of conditions have been met.
- Distant signals only display deferred orders and require the driver to adapt their speed in order to be able to safely stop at the next point or signal. "A" (Avertissement, Warning) or "D" (Disque, Disk) plates are example of distant signals.

In general, the signalling device comprises:

- a 'block free' signal (green), meaning that the next block is clear or, in the case of a distant signal, that the next signal is also green;
- Warning signals or speed limits (yellow) requiring the driver to slow the train and especially to be able to stop before the next stop signal;
- Stop signals (red) require the train to stop.

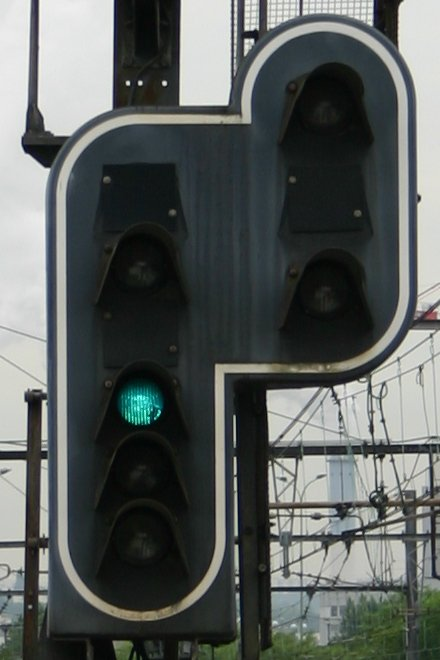
Block free: proceed

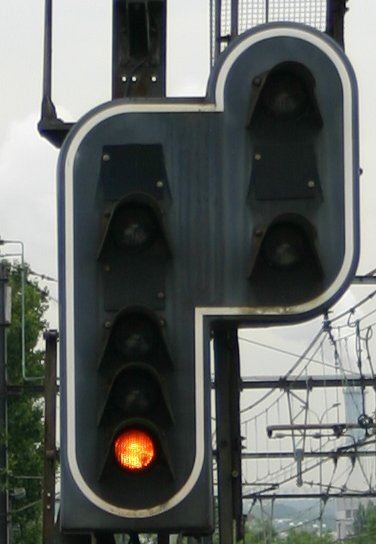
Warning

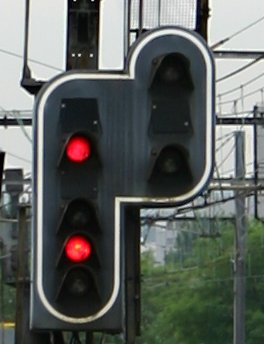
Carré: absolute stop

These signals are supplemented by "indicator signals" (signaux indicateurs) showing speed limits, slow-down orders and reminders to go slow on a diverging route, various indications about the track layout (number, dead ends or garage) the signs of electrical section, numbers of radio channels.

Mobile and temporary signals (e.g. construction), are used to complement permanent fixed signals.

Some signals are specific to manoeuvres. These include various types of signals:

- Hand signals,
- Mechanical signals,
- Lights,
- Acoustic signals
- Signal board.

Respect of signals is an imperative condition sine qua non of safety. The first section of the safety regulations of the SNCF indicates that "any official, whatever his rank must obey passively and immediately any signals that are presented."

== Appearance ==
Mainline or home signals, also known as those capable of displaying four aspects, such as carré, voie libre, avertissement, and sémaphore (under special conditions detailed below), are also known as Type C signals. They typically use a standardized vertical oblong chassis shape (châssis-écran) made from aluminum or other composite materials painted matte black to maximize visibility at far distances. This panel features a distinct shape known by flat vertical sides capped by semi-circular arcs at the top and bottom. The perimeter of the chassis is outlined by a highly reflective, 40 millimeter wide white border, letting the physical target remains highly visible to drivers in low-light or unlit conditions.

For a standard four aspect configuration, the chassis houses a single vertical column containing four lens units arranged vertically from top to bottom as red, 230 mm gap, green, red, and yellow, each measuring 160 millimeters in clear diameter and spaced exactly 230 millimeters center-to-center. Type C signals are known by their gap between their upper carré light and Voie libre gap. While that gap can house a shunting lamp, doing so invalidates its type of being a C signal.

The sémaphore aspect (detailed more closely below again) is used for block or traffic management when the current block is occupied. Entry is permissible under strict rules, which require maintaining a speed no more than 30 km/h (marche à vue) and remaining prepared to stop short of any obstacle within the driver's line of sight until the next signal (or 15 km/h in some cases). This aspect is displayed by illuminating only the lower light of the lower red lamp, along with a small secondary light module (not part of the chassis) called the peephole (œilleton), usually located to the left or right of the avertissement (warning) lamp at the bottom of the signal. If the upper light of the carré fails, the œilleton serves as a backup system by remaining illuminated during these types of events.

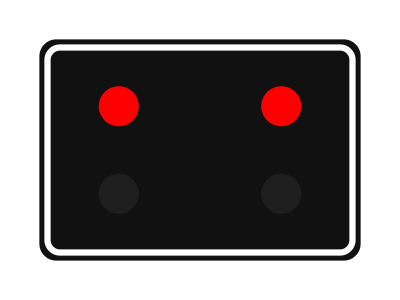
A horizantal carré signal. Note the horizantal shape

Although the carré signal is commonly vertical, they are sometimes shaped horizontally, (a square shape) to fit tight spaces. Examples contain like the platforms of Paris-Est and Paris-Saint-Lazare. In these stations, the vertical space underneath the station roofs and low bridges is simply too tight to house a full-sized vertical signal without risking a collapse of the whole station.

Unlike a standard vertical signal, a horizontal carré displays its stop aspect at the top, illuminating the top left and top right lights and leaving the bottom left and right lights non-illuminated (square shaped signal). In tight spaces where vertical clearance is slightly less constrained but still insufficient for a standard mast, the configuration shifts to illuminate the upper and lower right lights instead and leaving the upper left and right lights non-illuminated (oblong but not rounded-ish rectangle shape).

== Block systems ==
The block system is based on breaking a line into block sections. The block sections on a line between two stations are part of the block system.

Non interlocked manual blocks: For safety reasons, non-interlocked manual blocks are used only on double track.

Interlocked manual blocks: In the case of a single track, interlocking is used in manual blocks to avoid an error resulting in a head-on collision.

Automatic blocks: Two types of automatic block are in common use in France. BAL (Bloc Automatique Lumineux, Automatic Luminous Block) is used on high traffic lines with block lengths of about 1500 m and BAPR (Bloc Automatique à Permissivité Restreinte, Automatic Block with Restricted Permissiveness) is used in low traffic areas with block lengths up to 15 km, usually accompanied with a distant signal up to 1 km away from the BAPR signal for sufficient braking and can be passed either by verbal order or authorization, or after 15 minutes of waiting proceeding in marche à vue. In both cases they are similar to the UK automatic block signalling.

Normally a train can only enter a block if it is free. The block is a track section delimited by signals, whose length depends on the distance needed for a train to stop or slow down, in the worst conditions on the portion of line under consideration. When traffic density is low, the blocks may be longer.

In future, the blocks may be mobile and follow the progress of the train (virtual blocks, not materialized on the ground and calculated continuously by an integrated onboard system). This will optimize the use of the line and reduce the distance needed between successive trains. This moving block system is already in use on the central section of the RER line A between Nanterre-Préfecture and Vincennes. The trackside signals are still in place but are turned off at the approach of a train whose mobile system signalling (SACEM) is confirmed in operation. They are turned on if problems arise.

The current signalling system has already reduced the spacing between trains from 3 to 2 min. But this is still too long on the busiest lines (suburban, and high-speed lines). In comparison, the moving blocks of the RER A allow a separation of only 90 seconds between trains at full speed.

== Wayside signals ==
Here are some examples of signals used on the French network.

Signals and signs give information and special instructions to train drivers. For simplicity, only the most common elements are presented here.

=== Stop signals and warning signals ===
| Example light signals | Description | Mechanical signals |
|---|---|---|
| | Carré (two red lights, aligned either horizontally or vertically): stop. The carré orders an absolute stop and must not be passed under any circumstances except upon a written order from the signaller. It is a protection signal used to protect points, crossovers, stopping places, etc. This signal is also known as a square. As its name, carré, suggests, it was originally displayed as a square in mechanical signalling. | |
| | Sémaphore (one red light): stop. The semaphore is usually given because the block it protects is engaged by another train. As a permissive signal, the semaphore orders to stop at sight, then to proceed right away after halting. The plate defines the level of permissiveness, which determines under which conditions the driver may proceed. There may also be a small white light (lit) to confirm permissiveness when required. A driver passing through a red light must proceed at a speed within the sighting distance until they reach the next permissive signal. | |
| | Feu rouge clignotant (one flashing red light): proceed no faster than 15 km/h. The Feu rouge clignotant (flashing red) is a variant of the semaphore; stopping is not necessary. A driver may pass the signal with caution at a speed that allows the train to stop at any obstruction, at a maximum speed of 15 km/h after the signal. This signal is used when the next signal is dangerously close or coupling operations. | not used |
| | Avertissement (one yellow light): expect stop. The Avertissement (warning) signal warns the driver to stop before the next signal. Avertissement signals are typically used with the carré, Feu rouge cligotant, sémaphore, and with a signal that is not working or a buffer stop (heurtoir). | |
| | Feu jaune clignotant (flashing yellow): expect stop after the next signal or a possible speed reduction. The Feu jaune clignotant (flashing yellow) is used either as a preliminary warning when standard braking blocks are shortened. It alerts the driver that the upcoming warning signal (avertissement) stands at an insufficient, reduced distance from the stop signal or a buffer stop (heurtoir) or when the next signal has a possible speed reduction (Ralentissment 30/60, detailed below) | not used |
| | Voie libre (one green light): proceed. The Voie libre aspect (Clear block/track) indicates that the driver may proceed normally at maximum permissible speed if there is no reason not to do so. | all flipped on edge |
| | Ralentissement 30 (two horizontal yellow lights): proceed, expect points to pass at reduced speed. Ralentissement 30 (Slow 30) is a distant signal that indicates points in diverging position to be passed at a maximum speed of 30 km/h. It is always followed by a Slow 30 reminder. Ralentissement 30 can also be combined with the avertissement or the flashing yellow signal. Example seen below: Expect stop at short distance from next distant signal | |
| | Ralentissement 60 (two horizontal, flashing yellow lights): proceed, expect points to pass at reduced speed. Ralentissement 60 (Slow 60) is a distant signal that indicates points in diverging position to be passed at a maximum speed of 60 km/h. It is always followed by a Slow 30 reminder. Ralentissement 60 can also be combined with the flashing yellow signal. Example seen below: | not used |
| | Rappel de Ralentissement 30 (two vertical yellow lights): proceed at reduced speed until the train has cleared the points. Rappel de Ralentissement 30 (Slow 30 reminder) signals are used just before one or more points to be passed at a maximum speed of 30 km/h at the next chevron. Rappel de Ralentissement 30 can also be combined with the avertissement or the flashing yellow aspects. Examples seen below: Expect stop; expect other RR 30/60 reminder Expect stop at short distance from next distant signal | |
| | Rappel de Ralentissement 60 (two vertical yellow lights): proceed at reduced speed until the train has cleared the points. Rappel de Ralentissement 60 (Slow 60 reminder) signals are used just before one or more points to be passed at a maximum speed of 60 km/h at the next chevron. Rappel de Ralentissement 60 can also be combined with the avertissement or the flashing yellow aspects. Examples seen below: Expect stop; expect other RR 30/60 reminder Expect stop at reduced distance from next signal | not used |
| | Disque (one yellow light and one red light, both aligned horizontally): slow down and advance carefully to the next signal. The Disque (Disk) is a deferred halt instruction, i.e., the driver may pass the signal with caution at a speed which allows the train to stop at any obstruction, but must stop at the next platform or points (even if the signal aspect would allow him to proceed). The driver may continue after receiving a verbal instruction if there is no reason not to do so. | |
Signals mainly used on sidings
| | Violet carré (one violet light): hold; end of siding. Equivalent to the carré, it is used on sidings to control access to the main line or to protect points during shunting. | |
| | Feu blanc (one white light): proceed at reduced speed for shunting. The white aspect indicates that the driver is allowed to proceed for shunting, keeping to 30 km/h over points. | violet carré flipped on edge |
| | Feu blanc clignotant (one flashing white light): proceed at reduced speed for shunting over a short distance. The flashing white aspect indicates that the driver is allowed to proceed for shunting over a short distance. However, it does not allow the train to depart on the main line. | not used |
Special signals
| | Guidon d'arrêt (stop bar) The guidon d'arrêt is used to protect certain manoeuvres and sometimes level crossings, instead of hand signals. This signal is an order to halt. | |
| | Signal permanently cancelled (saltire in front of the signal): disregard the signal. The white cross indicates that the signal is permanently cancelled and must not be taken into account. | not used |
| | Signal temporarily cancelled (saltire on top of signal): disregard the signal. On Paris' RER A, wayside signals may be disabled at some places when trains are equipped with in-cab signalling. | not used |

=== Speed limits ===
| Sign | Meaning |
| or | Warning for an upcoming zone with a speed limit. The speed on the sign (in km/h) has to be reached at the next "Z" sign. The lozenge indicates that the upcoming speed limit is inferior by at least 40 km/h than the previous one and is equipped with a crocodile and in-cab repeater to enforce the warning. The crocodile system can also be used to warn about a succession of reduced speed limits. |
| | Start of a Zone with a speed limit. |
| | End of a zone with a speed limit. (Reprise de vitesse). |

=== Shunting signs ===
| Sign | Meaning |
| | The train is being directed to a siding (voie de Garage). |
| | The train is being directed to a Dépôt. |
| | The train is being directed to a dead end Impasse. |
| | Point not to be passed during shunting (Limite de Manœuvre). |

=== Stopping points in stations ===
| Sign | Meaning |
| | Stopping point for the front of the train (Tête de Train), however many carriages are in the train. |
| | Stopping point for trains made up of the number of carriages indicated on the sign (here 12 cars). |
| | Stopping point for TGVs. The number indicates the number of coupled trainsets. single trainset = 1; double trainsets = 2 |

=== Indications for electric locomotives ===
| Sign | Meaning |
| | Warning to change of electrical section (change of voltage). |
| | Beginning of a neutral zone (without electric power); electric locomotives must pass with the main circuit breaker open. This sign is usually placed far away from stops to avoid stalling. |
| | End of a neutral zone; some electric locomotives may close the main circuit breaker and raise the pantograph. |
| | Passing of neutral zone; this sign indicates that, either, trains with multiple pantographs, or, trains in the other direction, may close the main circuit breaker and raise the pantograph. |
| | End of the catenary: beyond this sign, the line is no longer electrified and only non-electric locos can continue. |

=== Other signs ===
| Sign | Meaning |
| | Mandates that drivers whistle or honk. Used when approaching passive level crossings or low-visibility zones. Although the standard sign applies at all times, the addition of the J (Jour) sign restricts this requirement only to daylight hours to prevent nighttime noise pollution. |
| | A station is coming up ahead. The distance is indicated on the sign. In this example, it is 200 meters. Drivers may slow down or stop if the train is scheduled to stop there. |
| | Zone with reduced loading gauge (bridge, tunnel). |
| | The upward chevron is an arrow pointing upwards, placed at the trailing end of switches at the exit of a group of converging or yard tracks to mark where shunting trains must stop. It is also used at the exit of some single-line stations to designate the point where the train must stop unless the signal ahead is open. |
| | The downward chevron is an arrow pointing downwards, or a V, placed at the needle of a switch; it indicates to the driver that the previously reminded speed limit to be passed for points starts here. |

== Cab signalling ==
With the arrival of the TGV, and its operating speeds well over 200 km/h, trackside signalling had to be abandoned in favour of cab-signalling, using track to cab communication technology known as Transmission Voie-Machine (TVM).

== ETCS ==
This system is intended to replace the different national signalling systems.

== Bibliography ==
- Gernigon, Alain (1998). Histoire de la signalisation ferroviaire français. Paris: Editions La Vie du Rail. ISBN 2-902808-69-0.
- Lemon, R. (1995). "An Introduction to French Signalling". Signalling Record Society Signalling Paper. 13.
- "Les différents types de blocks automatiques à la S.N.C.F.". La Vie du Rail. 1534 (14 March 1976): 10–12.
- Wurmser, D (2007). Signaux Mécaniques. Grenoble: EPresses and Editions Ferroviairesl.
- "Les signaux – Les régimes d'exploitation des lignes – Les systèmes d'espacement des trains" (PDF) (in French). EPSF. 5 July 2017.
