= Cristian Vogel =

Chilean musician

- Born: 1972 (age 53–54); Santiago, Chile
- Origin: England
- Genres: Electronic
- Member of: Super Collider

Cristian Vogel (born 1972) is a Chilean-born experimental electronic musician and producer.

== Career ==
Vogel attended the University of Sussex and graduated with a degree in modern music there, suffusing his techno compositions with influences from musique concrete and other avant-garde styles.

After some collaborations with Russ Gabriel, Vogel released his debut full-length, Beginning to Understand, in 1994 on Mille Plateaux, and began releasing music regularly after this on Tresor Records. He also started two labels of his own, Mosquito and Quinine, on which he releases both his own music and other artists'.

Alongside Jamie Lidell, he formed the group Super Collider in 1998, which released two albums. In the early 2000s, Vogel moved to Barcelona, where he set up the Erutufon 5 studio.

Vogel has also started a number of other record labels: Rise Robots Rise (now defunct), Sleep Debt, and Station 55 (also the name of his studio).

He sang and played guitar in the band Night of the Brain, based in Barcelona. Vogel has also done remixes for Radiohead, Maxïmo Park, Chicks on Speed, and Fujiya & Miyagi. As of 2021, he is based in Copenhagen.

== Discography ==
=== Albums ===
- 1994 – Beginning to Understand (Mille Plateaux)
- 1995 – Absolute Time (Tresor)
- 1996 – Specific Momentific (Mille Plateaux)
- 1996 – Body Mapping (Tresor Records)
- 1997 – All Music has come to an End (Tresor)
- 1999 – Busca Invisibles (Tresor)
- 2000 – Rescate 137 (novamute)
- 2000 – Sing Sweet Software (as Trurl and Klapaucious) (Supremat)
- 2002 – Dungeon Master (Tresor)
- 2005 – Station 55 (Novamute)
- 2007 – Double Deux/Delicado (Station 55)
- 2007 – The Never Engine (Tresor)
- 2010 – Black Swan (Choreographic score, 2009) (Sub Rosa)
- 2012 – The Inertials (Shitkatapult)
- 2014 – Polyphonic Beings (Shitkatapult)
- 2016 – The Assistenz (Shitkatapult)
- 2021 – The Rebirth of Wonky (Endless Process)
- 2022 – 1Zhuayo (Mille Plateaux)
- 2023 – Fase Montuno (Mille Plateaux)

=== EPs ===
- 1994 – Infra EP (Magnetic North)
- 1994 – Lambda EP (Magnetic North)
- 1994 – Intersync EP (Force Inc)
- 1994 – Narco Synthesis EP (Ferox)
- 1995 – Conscious Arrays EP (Force Inc)
- 1997 – Two Fat Downloads 88 EP (Primevil)
- 1999 – Boom Busine EP (Mosquito)
- 2009 – Crust Cloud Chunks EP (Snork Enterprises)
- 2009 – Endless Process EP (Artifexbcn)
- 2010 – Time To Feed The Alien EP (Snork Enterprises)
- 2012 – Enter the Tub (Shitkatapult)
- 2015 – 1994 EP (Edition Cristian Vogel)
- 2020 – Mind Control EP (Wormhole)

=== Singles ===
- 1994 – "We Equate Machines with Funkiness" (Mosquito)
- 1994 – "Tales From the Heart" (Force Inc)
- 1995 – "Defunkt #1" (Solid)
- 1995 – "Artists in Charge of Expert Systems" (Mosquito)
- 1996 – "The Visit: Defunkt #2" (Solid)
- 1996 – "Demolish Serious Culture" (Sativae)
- 1998 – "Defunkt Remixes" (Solid)
- 1998 – "Syncopate to Generate" (Sativae)
- 1999 – "General Arrepientase" (Tresor)
- 2000 – "Whipaspank" (Novamute)
- 2001 – "Me and My Shadow" (Novamute)
- 2005 – "1968. Holes" (Novamute)
- 2009 – "Crust Cloud Chunks Remixes" (Snork Enterprises)
- 2012 – "I like it – Sounds like Spain" (Hyper Connection)

=== Compositions for dance ===
- 2003 – "2-0-0-3" with Clive Jenkins and Franz Treichler
- 2004 – "Delicado" / choreography Gilles Jobin
- 2005 – "Steakhouse" / choreography Gilles Jobin
- 2006 – "Double Deux" / choreography Gilles Jobin
- 2008 – "Text to Speech" / choreography Gilles Jobin
- 2009 – "Black Swan" / choreography Gilles Jobin
