= Headon (surname) =

Headon is a surname. Notable people with the surname include:

- Hefina Headon (1930–2013), Welsh human rights activist
- Thomas Headon (born 2000), British-born Australian singer-songwriter
- Topper Headon (born 1955), English drummer

== See also ==
- Headon, Nottinghamshire, a village in England
