= Head-on collision =

Traffic collision type

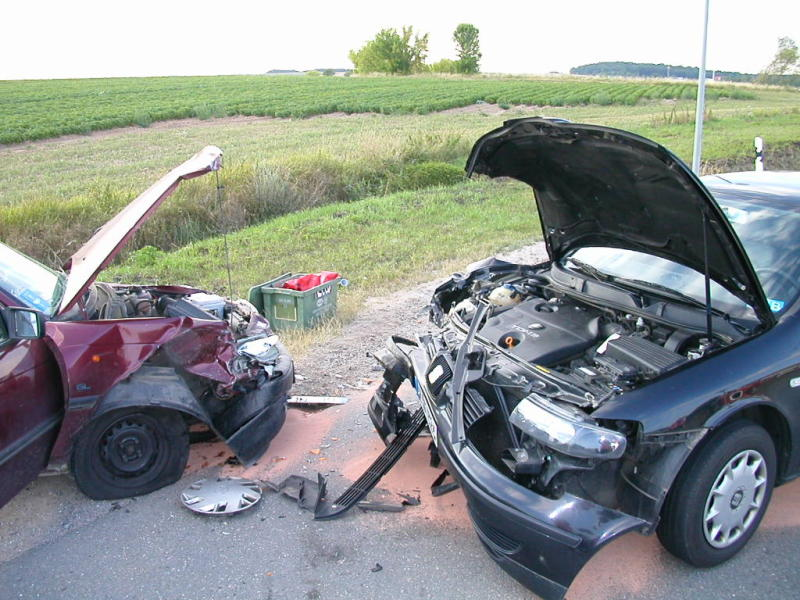
Aftermath of a head-on collision between two cars

A head-on collision is a traffic collision where the front ends of two vehicles such as cars, trains, ships or planes hit each other when travelling in opposite directions, as opposed to a side collision or rear-end collision.

== Rail transport ==
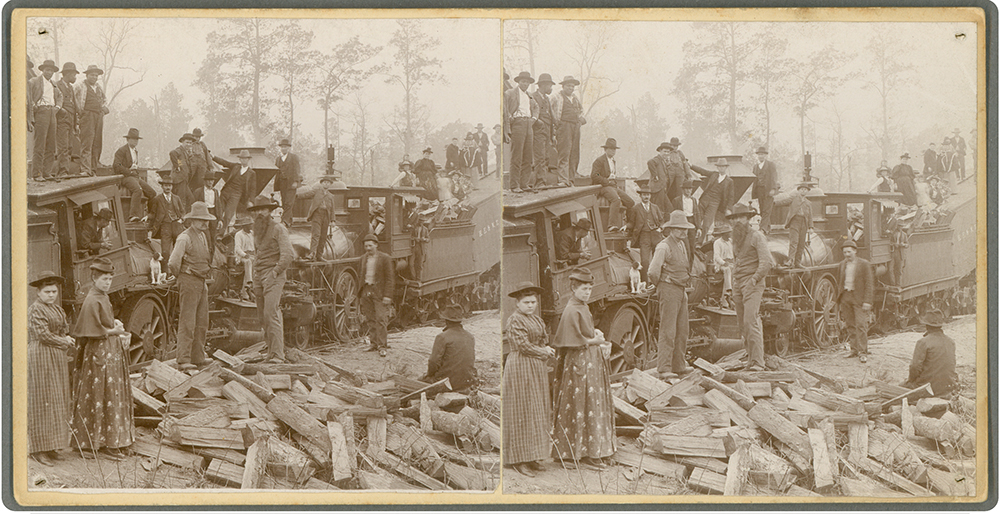
Wreck near Lufkin, Texas, on 27 February 1895

With railways, a head-on collision occurs most often on a single line railway. This usually means that at least one of the trains has passed a signal at danger, or that a signalman has made a major error. Head-on collisions may also occur at junctions, for similar reasons. In the early days of railroading in the United States, such railway accidents were quite common and gave the rise to the term "cornfield meet". As time progressed and signalling became more standardized, such collisions became less frequent. Even so, the term still sees some usage in the industry. The origins of the term are not well known, but it is attributed to crashes happening in rural America where farming and cornfields were common. The first known usage of the term was in the mid-19th century.

The distance required for a train to stop is usually greater than the distance that can be seen before the next blind curve, which is why signals and safeworking systems are so important.

=== List of collisions ===
Note: if the collision occurs at a station or junction, or trains are traveling in the same direction, then it is not strictly a head-on collision.

Date	Name	Location	Cause	Deaths	Injuries	Ref.
17 July 1856	Great Train Wreck of 1856	Whitemarsh Township, Pennsylvania, United States	Human error	±60	>100	
10 September 1874	Thorpe rail accident	Thorpe St Andrew, Norfolk, England	Single-line telegraphic working error	25	75	
7 August 1876	Radstock rail accident	Somerset and Dorset Joint Railway, England	Single-line telegraphic working error	15		
15 September 1896	Crash at Crush	"Crush", McLennan County, Texas, United States	Intentional publicity stunt to dispose of obsolete engines	2	6+	
24 September 1904	New Market train wreck	New Market, Tennessee, United States	Engineer error	56–113	106	
15 September 1907	Canaan train wreck	Canaan, New Hampshire, United States	Train dispatcher error	26	17	
9 July 1918	Great Train Wreck of 1918	Nashville, Tennessee, United States	Human error	101	171	
20 December 1919	Onawa train wreck	Onawa, Maine, United States	Mis-reading of train orders	23	50	
26 January 1921	Abermule train collision	Abermule, Montgomeryshire, Wales	Single-line token error	17	36	
5 December 1921	Bryn Athyn Train Wreck	Bryn Athyn, Pennsylvania, United States	Human error	27	70	
12 March 1940	Turenki rail accident	Turenki, Finland	Signalling error	39	69	
20 October 1957	Yarımburgaz train disaster	Yarımburgaz, Küçükçekmece, İstanbul, Turkey	Allowing two trains into same occupied block section by signalmen	95	150	
16 November 1960	Stéblová train disaster	Stéblová, Czechoslovakia	Collision	118	110	
7 February 1969	Violet Town rail accident	Violet Town, Victoria, Australia	Driver heart attack	9	117	
27 May 1971	Dahlerau train disaster	Dahlerau, Radevormwald, West Germany	Not determined	46	25	
4 May 1976	1976 Schiedam train accident	Near Schiedam, Netherlands	Error by chief conductor and train driver, lack of ATB	24		
28 August 1979	Nijmegen train collision	Between Wijchen and Nijmegen, Netherlands		8	36	
25 July 1980	Winsum train collision	Winsum, Groningen, Netherlands		9	21	
11 September 1985	Moimenta-Alcafache train crash	Mangualde, Portugal		49		
8 February 1986	Hinton train collision	Dalehurst, Alberta, Canada	Locomotive engineer fatigue, conductor error	23	71	
17 February 1986	Queronque rail accident	Limache, Marga Marga Province, Chile	Human error	58+	510	
19 October 1987	1987 Bintaro train crash	Bintaro, Tangerang, Indonesia	Human error	156	±300	
6 March 1989	Glasgow Bellgrove rail crash	Bellgrove, Glasgow, Scotland	Signal passed at danger	2		
21 July 1991	Newton (South Lanarkshire) rail accident	Newton, South Lanarkshire, Scotland	Signal passed at danger, inadequate junction layout	4	22	
15 October 1994	Cowden rail crash	Cowden railway station, Kent, England	Signal passed at danger	5	13	
14 January 1996	Hines Hill train collision	Hines Hill, Western Australia, Australia	Signal passed at danger	2		
12 August 1998	Suonenjoki rail collision	Suonenjoki, Finland	Misinterpretation of signals, possible signal malfunction	0	26	
2 August 1999	Gaisal train disaster	Gaisal, Uttar Dinajpur, West Bengal, India	Human error	285	>300	
5 October 1999	Ladbroke Grove rail crash	Ladbroke Grove, London, England	Signal passed at danger	31	417	
4 January 2000	Åsta accident	Åsta, Åmot, Norway		19		
7 January 2005	Crevalcore train crash	Crevalcore, Italy				
22 September 2006	Lathen train collision	Lathen, Germany	Human error	23	11	
11 October 2006	Zoufftgen train collision	Zoufftgen, Lorraine, France	Human error	6	20	
12 September 2008	2008 Chatsworth train collision	Los Angeles, California, United States	Signal passed at danger	25	135	
15 February 2010	Halle train collision	Buizingen, Halle, Belgium	Running of a red signal	19	171	
29 January 2011	Hordorf train collision	Hordorf, Saxony-Anhalt, Germany		10	23	
19 February 2012	Air Limau train collision	Air Limau, Muara Enim, Indonesia	Running of a red signal following locomotive crew fatigue	4	2	
21 April 2012	Sloterdijk train collision	Westerpark, Amsterdam, Netherlands	Signal passed at danger (suspected)	1	116	
9 February 2016	Bad Aibling rail accident	Bad Aibling, Bavaria, Germany	Signalman's error	12	85	
12 July 2016	Andria-Corato train collision	Andria, Apulia, Italy	Human error	23	54	
15 November 2017	Joo Koon rail accident	Joo Koon MRT station, Singapore	Software-related issue	0	38	
13 December 2018	Marşandiz train collision	Marşandiz railway station, Ankara, Turkey	Signal-related issue	9	84	
24 May 2021	2021 Kelana Jaya LRT collision	Between Kampung Baru LRT station and KLCC LRT station, Kuala Lumpur, Malaysia	Human error	0	213	
28 February 2023	Tempi train crash	Tempi, Larissa, Thessaly, Greece	Unknown	57	80	
5 January 2024	2024 Cicalengka railway collision	Cicalengka Station, Bandung Regency, Indonesia	Signal-related issue	4	37	
21 October 2024	2024 Talerddig train collision	Talerdigg, Powys, Wales	Low rail adhesion due to leaves and failed sanders	1	15	

== Sea transport ==
With shipping, there are two main factors influencing the chance of a head-on collision. Firstly, even with radar and radio, it is difficult to tell what course the opposing ships are following. Secondly, big ships have so much momentum that it is very hard to change course at the last moment.

== Road transport ==
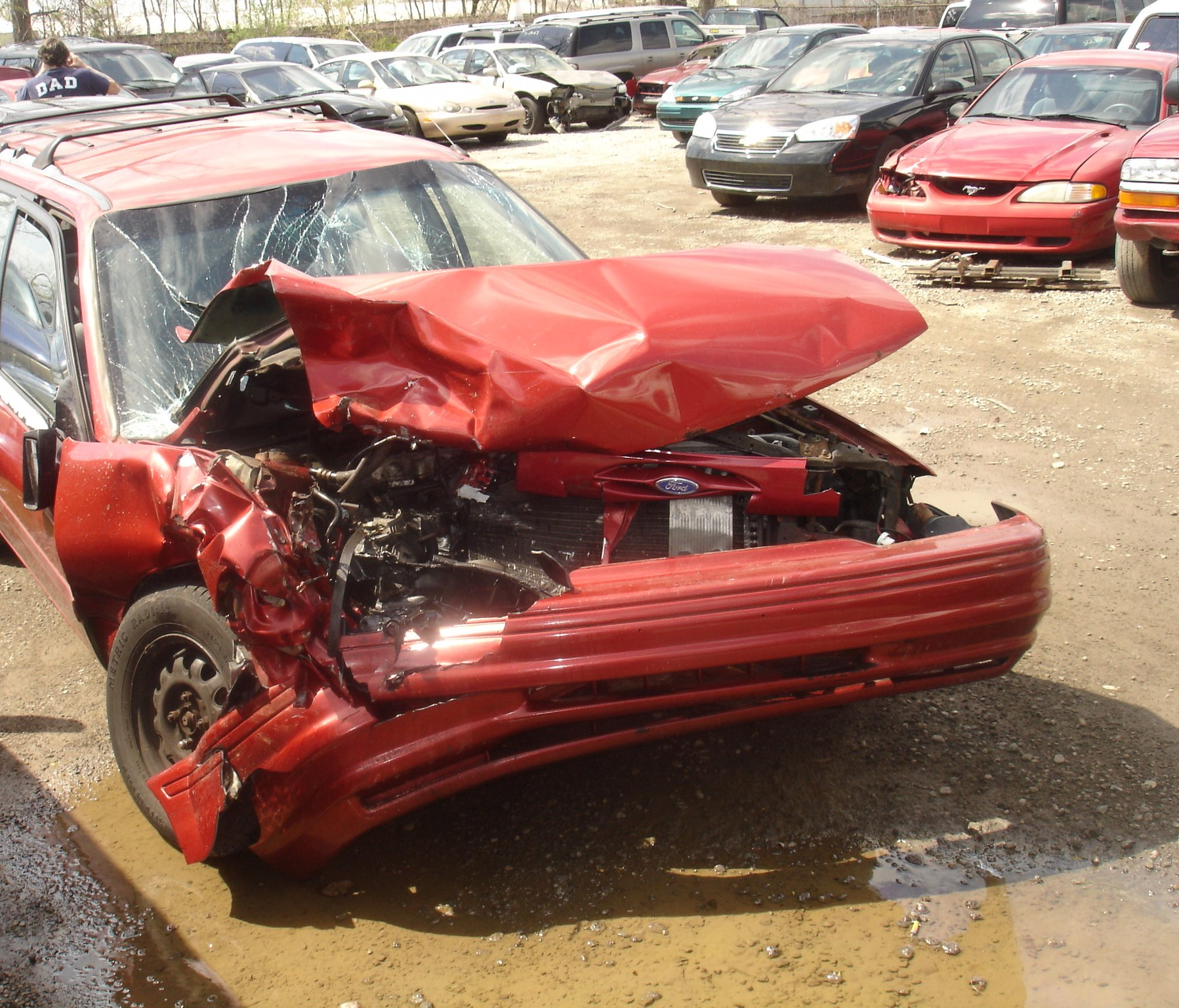
A Ford Escort automobile that has been involved in a head-on collision with a sport utility vehicle

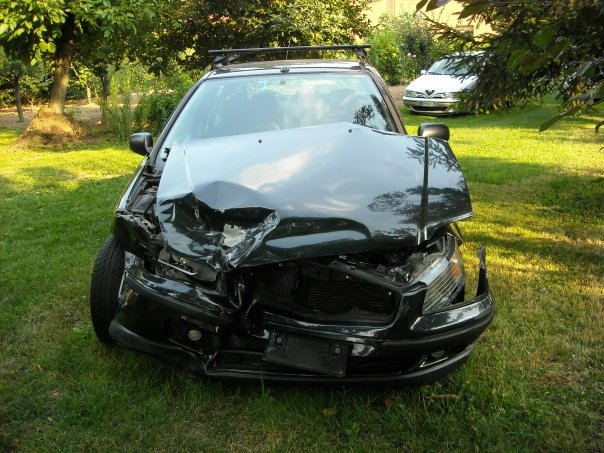
A Honda Civic that has been involved in a head-on collision with a Fiat Panda

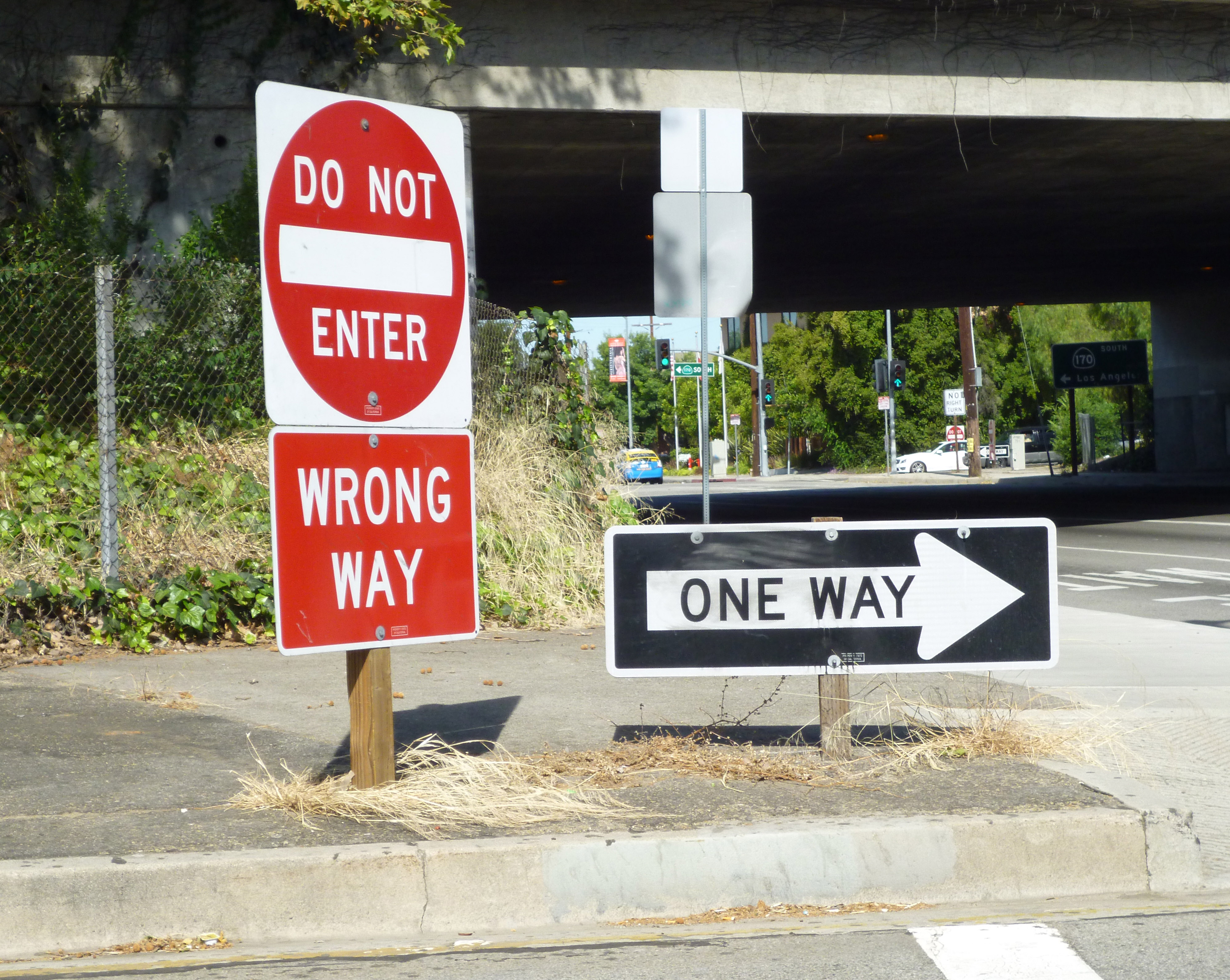
Standard wrong-way sign package used on all freeway off-ramps in the state of California to prevent head-on collisions

Head-on collisions are an often fatal type of road traffic collision. The NHTSA defines a head-on collision thusly:

Refers To A Collision Where The Front End Of One Vehicle Collides With The Front End Of Another Vehicle While The Two Vehicles Are Traveling In Opposite Directions.

In Canada, in 2017, 6,293 vehicles and 8,891 persons were involved in head-on collision, injuring 5,222 persons and killing 377 other.

U.S. statistics show that in 2005, head-on crashes were only two per cent of all crashes, yet accounted for ten per cent of U.S. fatal crashes. A common misconception is that this over-representation is because the relative velocity of vehicles travelling in opposite directions is high. While it is true (via Galilean relativity) that a head-on crash between two vehicles traveling at 50 mph is equivalent to a moving vehicle running into a stationary one at 100 mph, it is clear from basic Newtonian Physics that if the stationary vehicle is replaced with a solid wall or other stationary near-immovable object such as a bridge abutment, then the equivalent collision is one in which the moving vehicle is only traveling at 50 mph., except for the case of a lighter car colliding with a heavier one. The television show MythBusters performed a demonstration of this effect in a 2010 show.

In France, in the years 2017 and 2018, 2563 and 2556 head-on collisions (collision frontales) outside built-up area outside motorways killed 536 and 545 people respectively. They represent about 16% of all the fatalities including the ones on motorways and within built-up area.

In Quebec, head-on collisions are involved in eight per cent of work-related issues, but this figure rises to 23 per cent when the vehicles involved are in a rural zone where the maximum speed is greater than 70 km/h (43 mph).

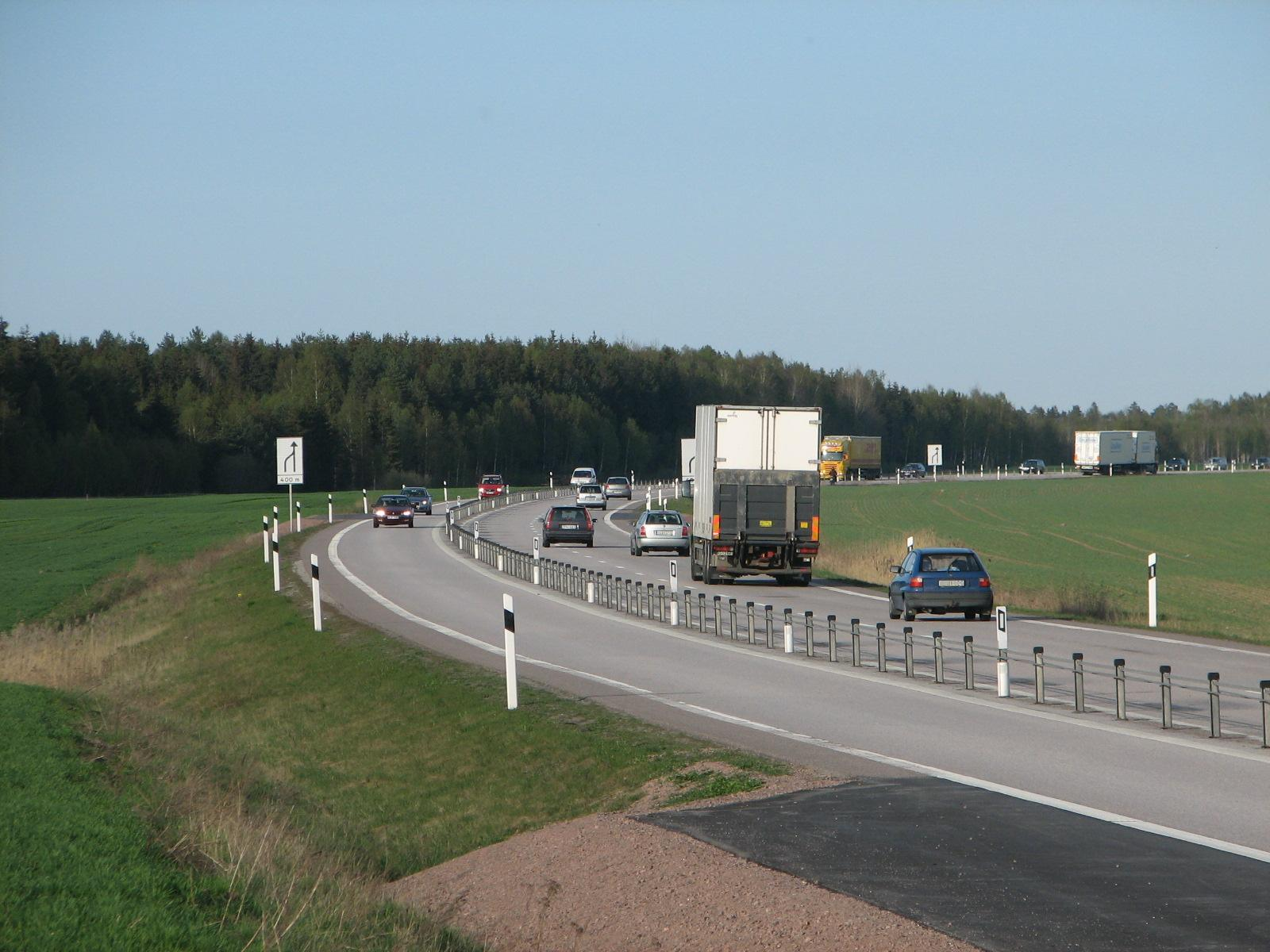
2+1 road with cable barrier, on the European route E20 near Skara, Sweden. The first median barrier on a 2+1 road installed in 1998 helped to avoid many head-on collisions.

Head-on collisions, sideswipes, and run-off-road crashes all belong to a category of crashes called lane-departure or road-departure crashes. This is because they have similar causes, if different consequences. The driver of a vehicle fails to stay centered in their lane, and either leaves the roadway, or crosses the centerline, possibly resulting in a head-on or sideswipe collision, or, if the vehicle avoids oncoming traffic, a run-off-road crash on the far side of the road.

Preventive measures include traffic signs and road surface markings to help guide drivers through curves, as well as separating opposing lanes of traffic with wide central reservation (or median) and median barriers to prevent crossover incidents. Median barriers are physical barriers between the lanes of traffic, such as concrete barriers or cable barriers. These are actually roadside hazards in their own right, but on high speed roads, the severity of a collision with a median barrier is usually lower than the severity of a head-on crash.

The European Road Assessment Programme's Road Protection Score (RPS) is based on a schedule of detailed road design elements that correspond to each of the four main crash types, including head-on collisions. The Head-on Crash element of the RPS measures how well traffic lanes are separated. Motorways generally have crash protection features in harmony with the high speeds allowed. The Star Rating results show that motorways generally score well with a typical 4-star rating even though their permitted speeds are the highest on the network. But results from Star Rating research in Britain, Germany, the Netherlands and Sweden have shown that there is a pressing need to find better median (central reservation), run-off and junction protection at reasonable cost on single carriageway roads.

Another form of head-on crash is the wrong-way entry crash, where a driver on a surface road turns onto an off-ramp from a motorway or freeway, instead of the on-ramp. They can also happen on divided arterials if a driver turns into the wrong side of the road. Considerable importance is placed on designing ramp terminals and intersections to prevent these incidents. This often takes to form of special signage at freeway off-ramps to discourage drivers from going the wrong way. Section 2B.41 of the Manual on Uniform Traffic Control Devices describes how such signs should be placed on American highways.

Neither vehicle in a head-on collision need be a "car"; the Puisseguin road crash was between a truck and a coach.

=== Sideswipe collisions ===
Sideswipe collisions are where the sides of two vehicles travelling in the same or opposite directions touch. They differ from head-on collisions only in that one vehicle impacts the side of the other vehicle rather than the front. Severity is usually lower than a head-on collision, since it tends to be a glancing blow rather than a direct impact. However, loss of control of either vehicle can have unpredictable effects and secondary crashes can dramatically increase the expected crash severity.

== See also ==
- Lists of rail accidents
- Road collision types
