= Zoufftgen =

- Commune
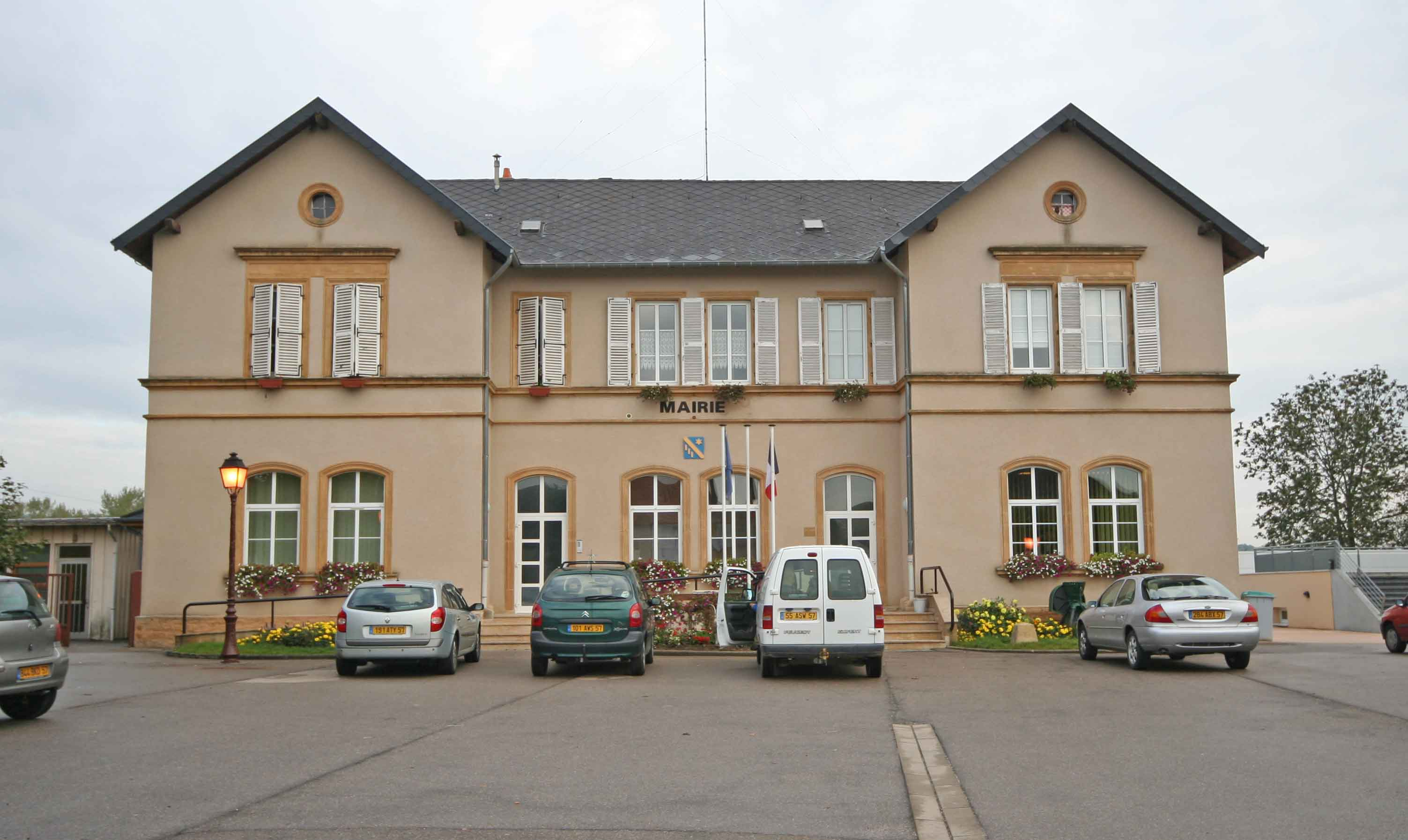
- The mairie (town hall) in Zoufftgen

- Coat of arms
- Location of Zoufftgen
- Location within France Location within Grand Est
- Coordinates: 49°27′47″N 6°08′01″E
- Country: France
- Region: Grand Est
- Department: Moselle
- Arrondissement: Thionville
- Canton: Yutz
- Intercommunality: Cattenom et Environs

Government
  - Mayor (2020–2026): Michel Paquet
- Area^{1}: 16.7 km^{2} (6.4 sq mi)
- Elevation: 220 m (720 ft)
- Highest elevation: 395 m (1,296 ft)
- Lowest elevation: 200 m (660 ft)
- Population (2023): 1,264
  - Density: 75.7/km^{2} (196/sq mi)
- Demonym(s): Zoufftgenois, Zoufftgenoises
- Time zone: UTC+01:00 (CET)
  - Summer (DST): UTC+02:00 (CEST)
- INSEE/Postal code: 57764 /57330
- ^{1} French Land Register data, which excludes lakes, ponds, glaciers > 1 km^{2} (0.386 sq mi or 247 acres) and river estuaries.

Zoufftgen (French pronunciation: [zufgən]; German: Suftgen; Luxembourgish: Suuftgen [ˈzuːftɕən]) is a commune in the Moselle department in Grand Est in north-eastern France.

== Population ==
Historical population

Year	Pop.	±% p.a.
1793	600	—
1800	682	+1.85%
1806	550	−3.52%
1821	742	+2.02%
1836	719	−0.21%
1841	731	+0.33%
1861	702	−0.20%
1866	729	+0.76%
1871	637	−2.66%
1875	605	−1.28%
1880	593	−0.40%
1885	615	+0.73%
1890	615	+0.00%
1895	628	+0.42%
1900	626	−0.06%
1905	596	−0.98%
1910	637	+1.34%

Year	Pop.	±% p.a.
1921	600	−0.54%
1926	614	+0.46%
1931	571	−1.44%
1936	544	−0.96%
1946	395	−3.15%
1954	431	+1.10%
1962	470	+1.09%
1968	455	−0.54%
1975	490	+1.06%
1982	664	+4.44%
1990	597	−1.32%
1999	608	+0.20%
2007	676	+1.33%
2012	1,006	+8.28%
2017	1,222	+3.97%
2023	1,264	+0.56%

Source: EHESS and INSEE

== 2006 rail crash ==
On the morning of 11 October 2006 a passenger train and a goods train collided head-on, killing six people.

== See also ==
- Communes of the Moselle department
