= List of rail accidents (2020–present) =

This is a list of rail accidents from 2020 onward. This list does not contain incidents with singular fatalities of pedestrians who were not in a vehicle.

Entries that involve no injuries/deaths and no spilled hazardous materials may be deleted. Entries must be sourced. For a list of terrorist incidents involving trains, see List of terrorist incidents involving railway systems.

Bold text in the list below indicates that an article about the accident has been created.

== 2020 ==
- 1 January – United States – In Bonners Ferry, Idaho, a BNSF train derailed and fell into the Kootenai River, injuring two people.
- 7 January – Mexico – Seven people died and more than 30 were injured after a Ferromex train struck a bus at a level crossing in Sonora.
- 29 January – Australia – A freight train derailed near Barnawartha, Victoria and collided with a passenger train coming in the other direction. Nineteen people required medical treatment.
- 6 February
  - Italy – Livraga derailment: A Frecciarossa high-speed train derailed at Livraga. Two people were killed and 31 were injured.
  - Canada – A Canadian Pacific freight train carrying crude oil derailed and caught fire at Guernsey, Saskatchewan. The village was partially evacuated. The Canadian government halved the speed limit for freight trains carrying hazardous materials as a result.
- 10 February – United States – In Morgantown, West Virginia, a Morgantown Personal Rapid Transit train was struck by an oncoming falling boulder, injuring three people.
- 13 February – United States – Five cars of a 96-car CSX freight train derailed in Draffin, Kentucky due to a rockslide. The locomotives and train cars caught fire, causing evacuations of nearby communities. Two crew members were hospitalized.
- 20 February – Australia – Wallan derailment: Sydney to Melbourne XPT derailed near Wallan, Victoria. Two people were killed, one was airlifted to hospital.
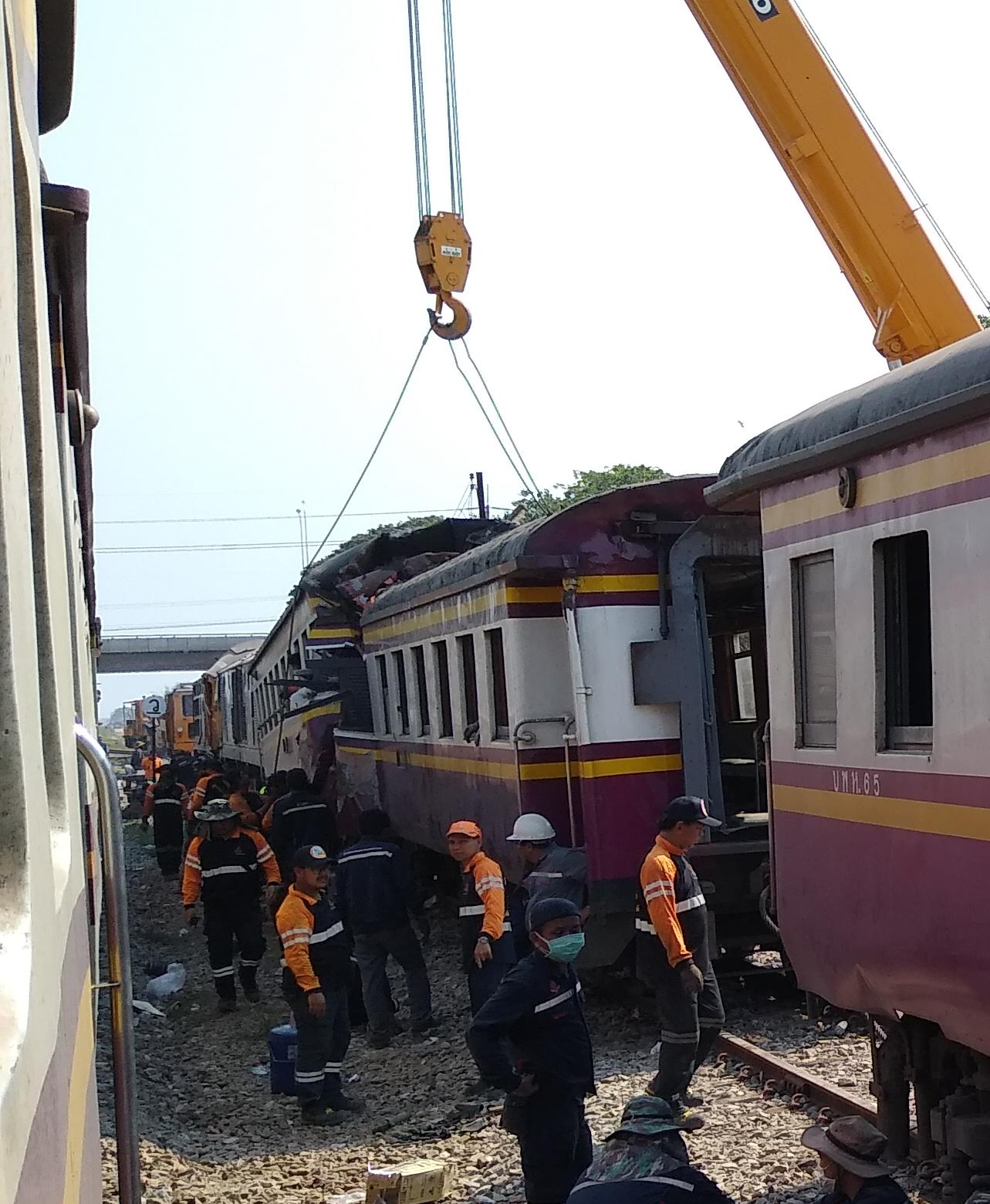
- Wreckage being cleared at Pak Tho station, Thailand
  24 February – Thailand – a freight train from Hat Yai Junction to Bang Sue and passenger train No.37 collided head-on at Pak Tho Railway Station in Ratchaburi Province, injuring at least 30.
- 28 February – Pakistan – In Sukkur, a train crashed into a bus, killing 20 and injuring dozens.
- 5 March – France – Ingenheim derailment: A TGV derailed near Ingenheim, Bas-Rhin due to a landslide. Twenty-two people were injured, one seriously.
- 10 March – Mexico – A Mexico City Metro train crashed into another at Tacubaya station, killing one person and injuring 41.
- 27 March
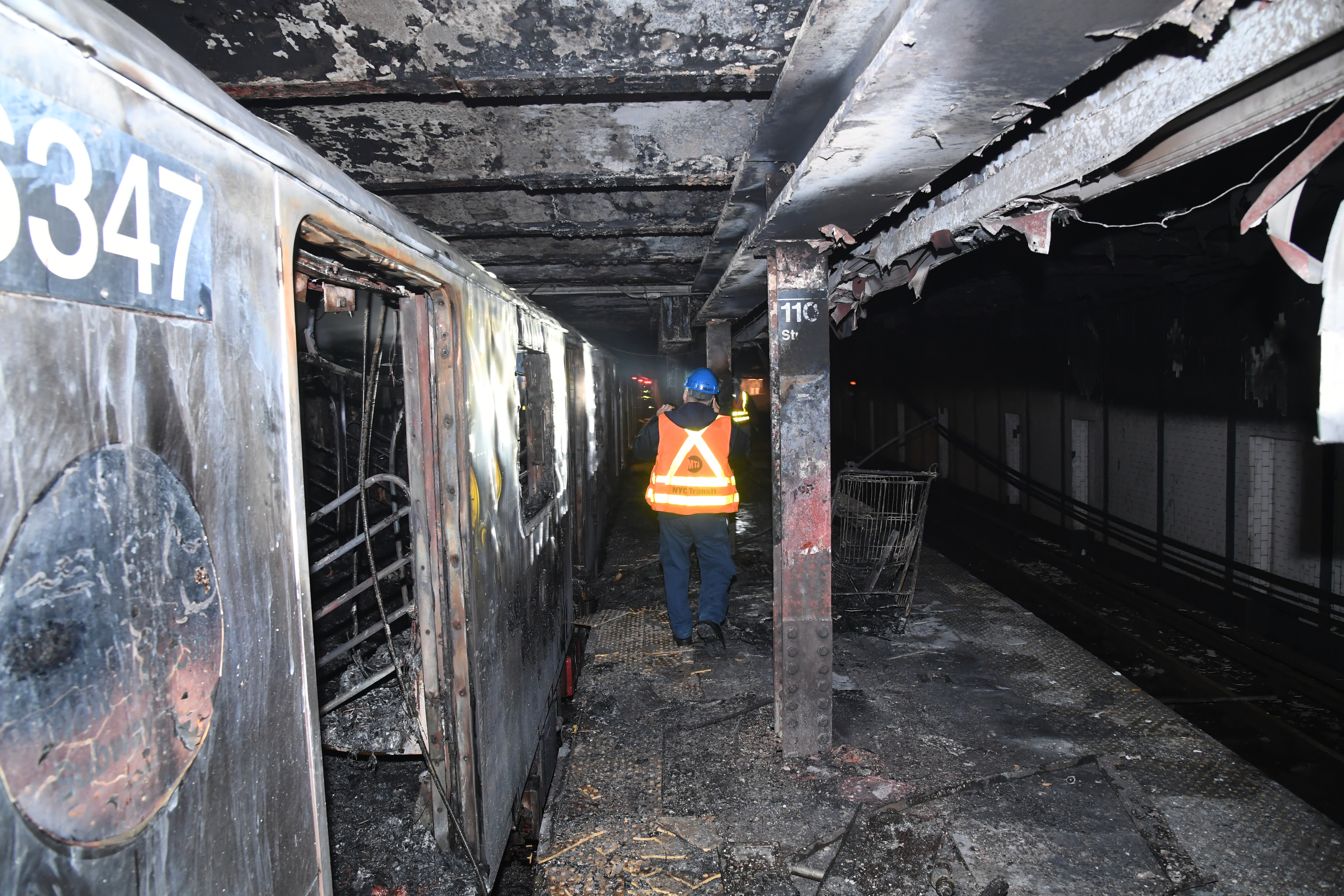
  - 2020 New York City Subway fire
    United States – 2020 New York City Subway fire: A fire on the 2 train at 110th Street station on the Lenox Avenue Line killed the train operator and injured 16 others.
  - United States – In DeLand, Florida, an Amtrak Auto Train derailed when 8 train cars tipped over. One person was injured.
- 30 March – China – A passenger train running from Jinan to Guangzhou derailed after colliding with debris on the track due to a landslide in Hunan Province. A railroad police officer was killed and 127 people were injured, four severely.
- 3 April – Germany – A freight train collided with a concrete piece of a bridge near a construction site. The engineer was killed and 3 others were injured.
- 8 May – India – Aurangabad railway accident: A goods train ran over and killed 16 migrant labourers who were walking to their homes in Madhya Pradesh and slept on the railway tracks, believing that trains would not be running (only passenger trains were stopped, while goods railway services continued to function) due to a nationwide lockdown in the wake of the COVID-19 pandemic.
- 22 May – Netherlands – Hooghalen train crash, a train driver was killed and three people were injured after a Nederlandse Spoorwegen train collided with an agricultural vehicle.
- 24 May – Iran – In Tehran, a passenger train travelling from Hamedan to Mashhad derailed in Parand, injuring five.
- 2 June – Spain – A high-speed passenger train collided with a lorry that fell off a bridge on to the track at La Hiniesta and derailed, killing two people.
- 7 June – China – Train D1862 traveling between Guangzhou and Chongqing derailed at a tunnel between Huaiji County in Guangdong and Hezhou in Guangxi, injuring one. The suspected cause was a landslide from heavy rain.
- 7 July – Czech Republic – On the Karlovy Vary–Johanngeorgenstadt railway a ČD Class 814 Regionova and ČD Class 844 RegioShark collided head-on, killing two and injuring 24. In total there were 33 passengers aboard both trains.
- 15 July – Czech Republic – A ČD Class 471 train collided with a freight train at Český Brod, killing one person and injuring 35.
- 29 July – United States – In Tempe, Arizona, a Union Pacific train derailed on the Salt River Bridge over Tempe Town Lake, injuring one.
- 31 July – Portugal – Soure train crash: An Alfa Pendular high-speed passenger train derailed after colliding with a catenary maintenance vehicle, killing two and injuring 43.
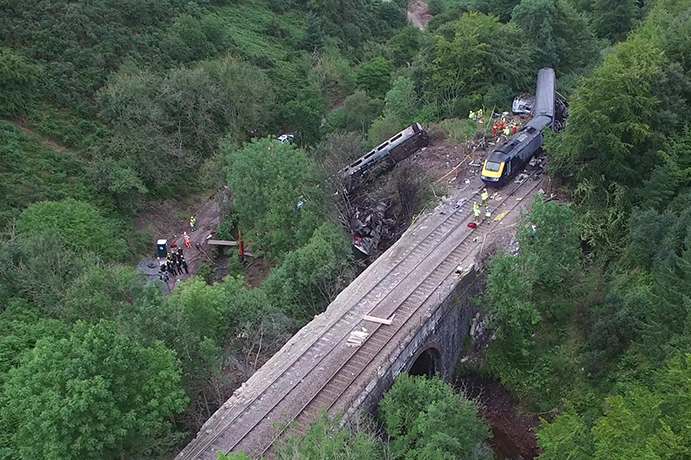
- Stonehaven derailment
  12 August – United Kingdom – Stonehaven derailment: A ScotRail Inter7City passenger train derailed near Carmont following stormy weather, killing three people and injuring six.
- 19 August – Italy – Carnate derailment: A passenger train ran away crewless from Paderno d'Adda and derailed at Carnate-Usmate station, injuring three people.
- 27 August – United Kingdom – Llangennech derailment: A freight train derailed and caught fire at Llangennech, Carmarthenshire.
- 20 September – United States – A New York City Subway train derailed in a suspected act of sabotage after a man clamped wooden planks onto the roadbed. Three passengers were injured.
- 11 October
  - United States – In Lilburn, Georgia, a CSX train derailed during heavy rains following Hurricane Delta, causing minor injuries to the two occupants of the locomotive.
  - Thailand – A freight train crashed into a bus at a railroad crossing, killing 20 people and injuring dozens.
- 29 October – United States – A 25-car Kansas City Southern freight train derailed in Mauriceville, Texas. Five tank cars were punctured, with one tank car containing a "corrosive material" that caused the evacuation of those within a mile (1600 m) of the crash site while those within a half-mile (800 m) of the evacuation zone were told to stay indoors. No injuries were reported.
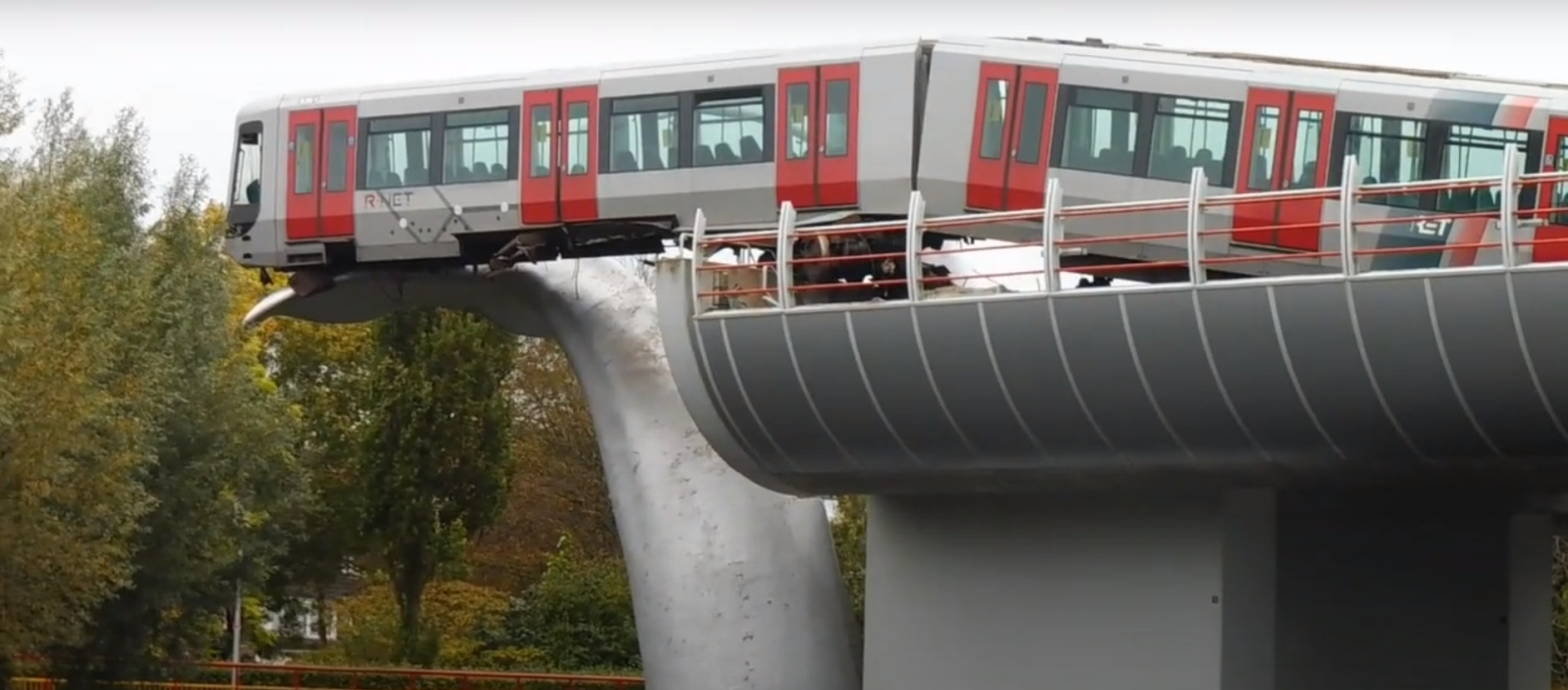
- Rotterdam metro crash
  2 November – Netherlands – Rotterdam metro crash: A Rotterdam Metro train collided with a buffer and nearly fell off the end of an elevated guideway, but was saved by a whale's tail sculpture at De Akkers metro station. No one was injured.
- 28 November – United States – In Wellington, Colorado, a BNSF train collided with an empty train car and derailed, injuring one.
- 19 December
  - United States – Two people were injured after a Dallas Area Rapid Transit northbound orange line train derailed and collided with a southbound red line train in downtown Dallas.
  - Bangladesh – In Dhaka, a passenger train crashed into a bus at a crossing, the cause was attributed to a gatekeeper sleeping on his job at the time of the crash. The gatekeeper was later fired, 12 people were killed and six others were injured.
- 22 December – United States – Near Custer, Washington, ten railcars of a BNSF train carrying Bukken crude oil derailed, and three cars caught fire. About 120 people in the half-mile (800 m) vicinity were evacuated and Interstate 5 was closed.

== 2021 ==
- 1 February – Canada – A Goderich–Exeter Railway freight train derailed at the port of Goderich, Ontario, destroying a heritage building.
- 6 March – United States – In Front Royal, Virginia, a Norfolk Southern train derailed, killing one.
- 7 March – Pakistan – In Sukkur District, Sindh, a train derailed between Rohri and Sangi stations, killing one and injuring over 40 other passengers.
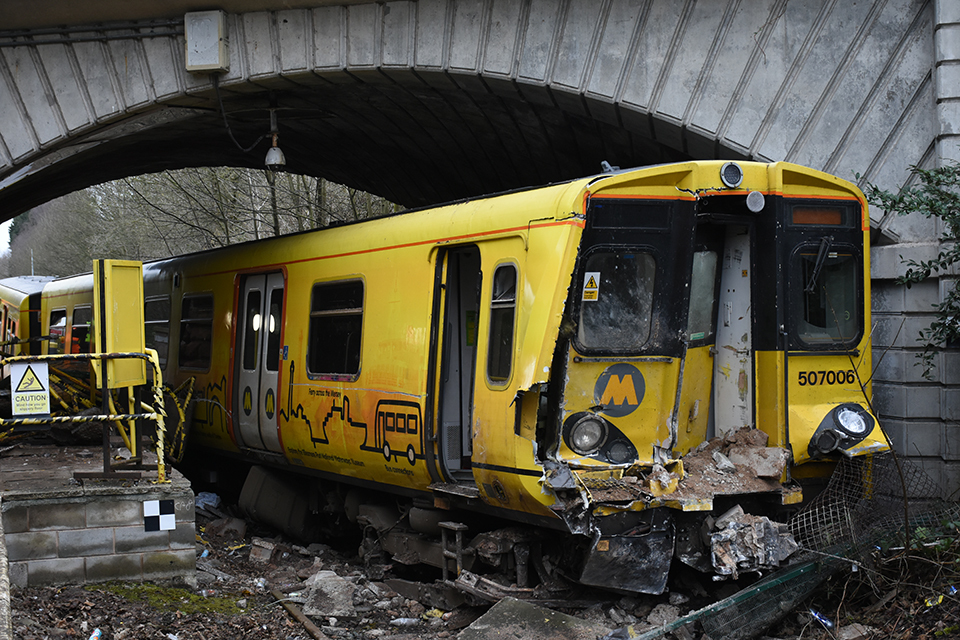
- Kirkby train crash
  13 March – United Kingdom – Kirkby train crash: A Class 507 passenger train operating for Merseyrail overran the buffer stop and derailed at Kirkby. Twelve people sustained minor injuries.
- 26 March – Egypt – Sohag train collision: A passenger train rear-ended a stationary train in Sohag, killing at least 18 people. Passengers in the first train intentionally applied the emergency brakes, stopping the train, after which the second train hit it from behind.
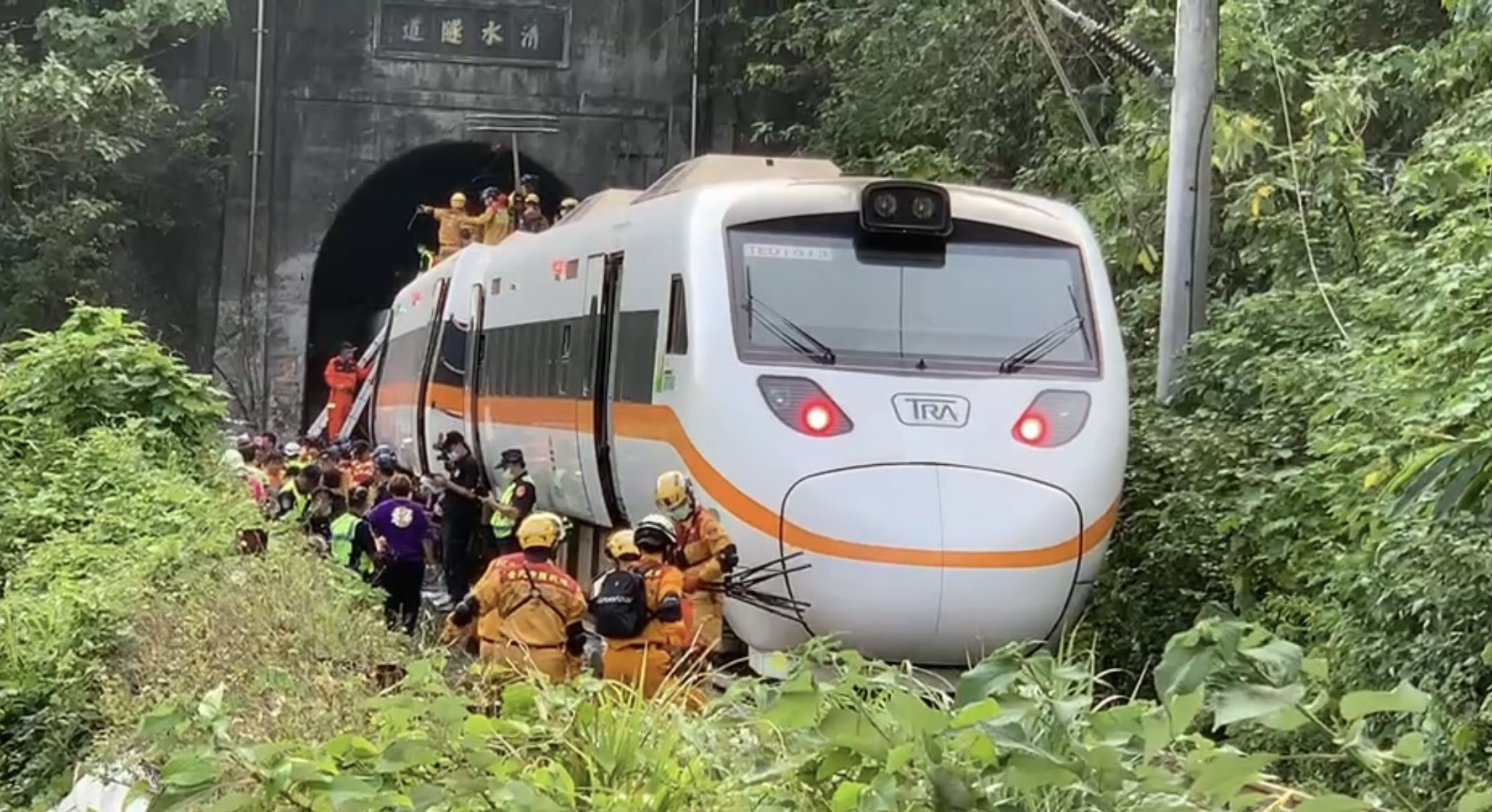
- 2021 Hualien train derailment
  2 April – Taiwan – 2021 Hualien train derailment: A southbound 408 Taroko Express train derailed inside the Chingshui Tunnel while approaching Chongde Station north of Hualien City after crashing into a maintenance truck that had rolled down a hill and fell onto the track, killing 49 and injuring 202 people in the island's deadliest rail disaster since 1948.
- 4 April – Czech Republic – 2021 Světec train crash: Express freight train No. 54334 of ORLEN Unipetrol Doprava (UNIDO), hauled by locomotive 753.740 collided with ČD Cargo freight train No. 66403, hauled by locomotive 123.023, at Světec Station. The driver of the ČD Cargo train jumped out of the locomotive and survived, but the driver of the UNIDO train died.
- 15 April – Egypt – A passenger train derailed in Minya al-Qamh, injuring 15.
- 18 April – Egypt – Toukh train accident: A passenger train derailed in Toukh, killing 23 people and injuring 139.
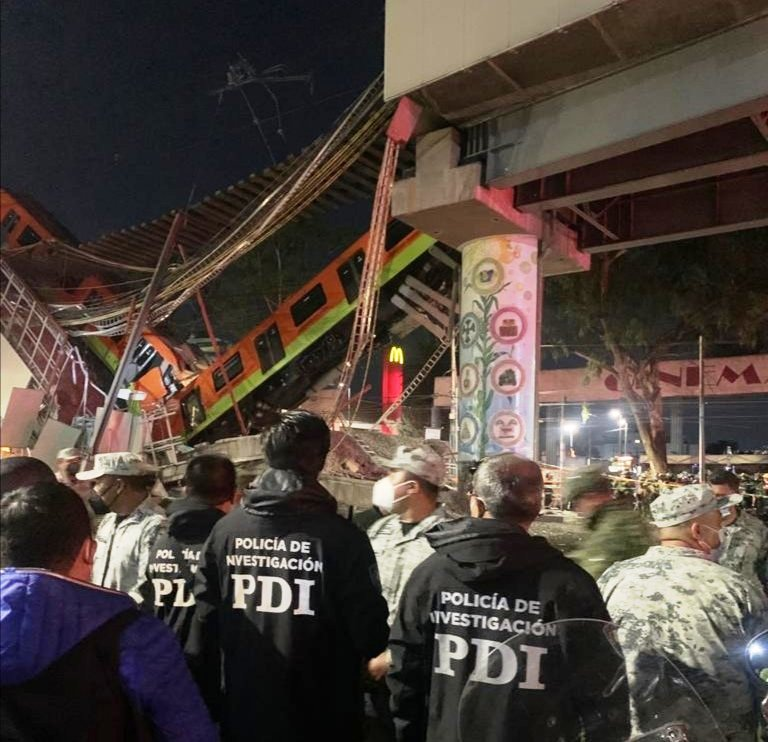
- Mexico City
  3 May – Mexico – Mexico City Metro overpass collapse: 26 people were killed and 98 were injured after a Mexico City Metro bridge collapsed while a train crossed over.
- 24 May – Malaysia – 2021 Kelana Jaya LRT collision: 213 people were injured, 47 seriously, after two Rapid KL trains collided in Kuala Lumpur near the Petronas Twin Towers.
- 4 June – China – A train in Jinchang, Gansu entered an area with rail engineering works ongoing and killed nine track workers.
- 7 June – Pakistan – 2021 Ghotki rail crash: The Millat Express, traveling from Karachi to Sargodha, derailed between Daharki and Reti Stations due to a failed weld joint in the rail. A minute after the derailment, the Sir Syed Express, traveling in the opposite direction from Rawalpindi to Karachi, hit the Millat Express. 65 people were killed and around 150 were injured.
- 18 June – Australia – In Queensland, a Leto train collided onto an ee16 train, killing one.
- 9 July – Austria – A railcar struck a fallen tree on the Mur Valley Railway and derailed. One of the three carriages ended up on its side in the Mur river. Seventeen people were injured.
- 20 July – China – During the 2021 Henan floods, a Line 5 Zhengzhou Metro train was trapped in a tunnel by floodwaters that entered its cars and reached chest height. 14 drowned.
- 23 July – United Kingdom – In Sheffield, United Kingdom, a lorry crashed into Sheffield Supertram Train #105 and derailed, injuring one.
- 30 July – United States – Two MBTA Green Line trains collided with each other in downtown Boston, injuring 25 people.
- 4 August – Czech Republic – Milavče train crash: A Baureihe 233 locomotive (223 066) hauling an international service from Munich to Prague passed a stop signal and collided head-on at Milavče with a ČD Class 844 RegioShark hauling a local service from Plzeň to Domažlice, killing three people and injuring 42.
- 26 August – United States – In St Paul, Minnesota, three trains (one Union Pacific, one Canadian Pacific, and one BNSF) collided onto each other, spilling chlorine into a river.
- 5 September – Bangladesh – In Moulvibazar, a train collided with a bus stalled on the tracks, killing three people and injuring six.
- 8 September – Turkey – In Istanbul, two trains collided onto each other, injuring seven.
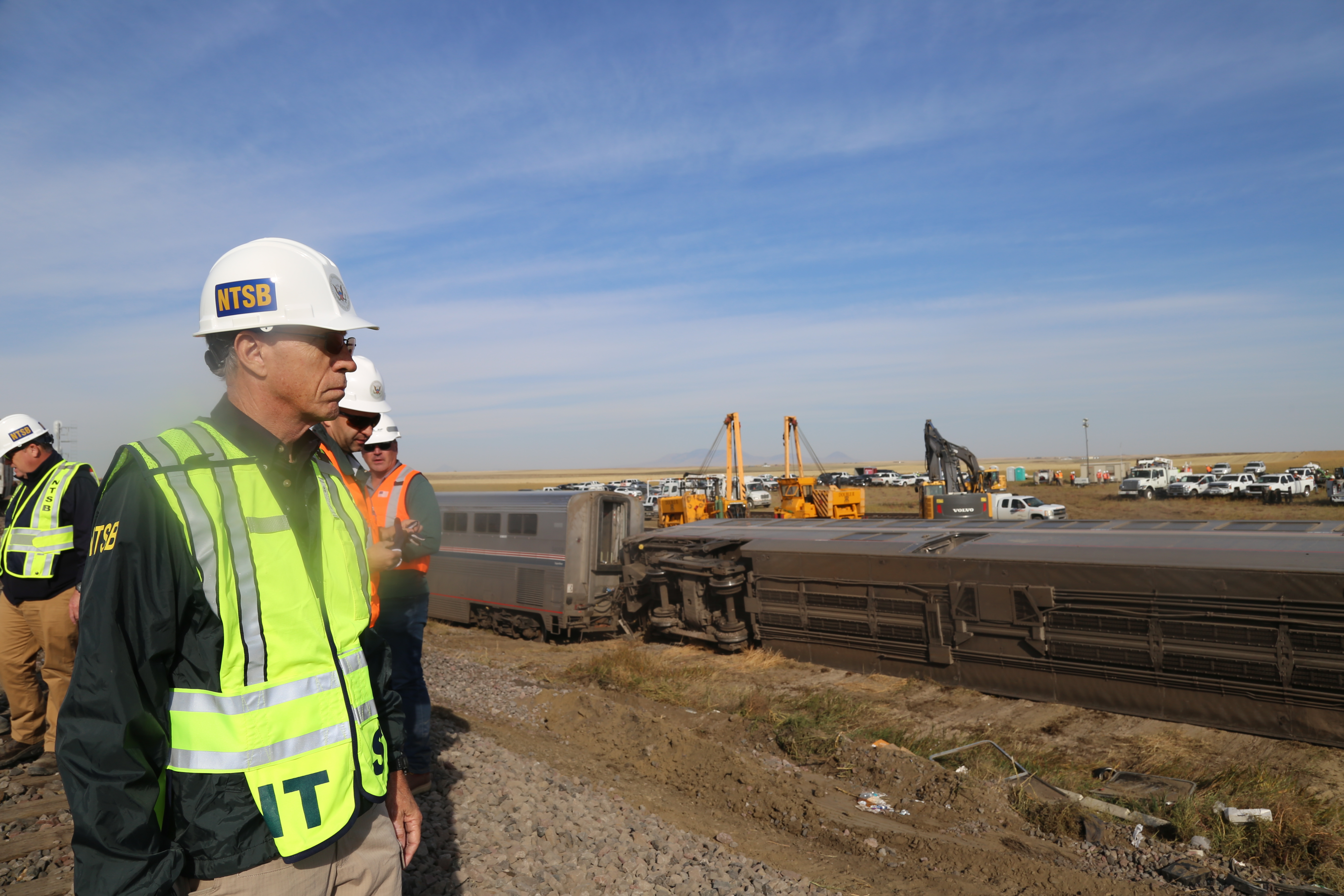
- 2021 Montana train derailment
  25 September – United States – 2021 Montana train derailment: The eight rear Superliner cars of Amtrak's westbound Empire Builder train 7/27, a doubleheader traveling from Chicago to Seattle derailed and tipped over near Joplin, Montana, killing three people and injuring 50.
- 8 October
  - Tunisia – In Carthage Dermech, a commuter train collided with a stationary train, injuring 33.
  - Japan – In Tokyo, two trains derailed after a 5.9 magnitude earthquake, injuring three.
- 12 October
  - United Kingdom – In, Enfield, a suburb of London, a London Overground train collided with buffers at Enfield Town Station, injuring two.
  - United States – In Washington D.C., a Blue Line Washington Metro Train derailed near Arlington Cemetery Station, injuring one.
- 19 October – Australia – A South Coast Line train collided with a stolen car at a railroad crossing and derailed in Kembla Grange, New South Wales, injuring four people.
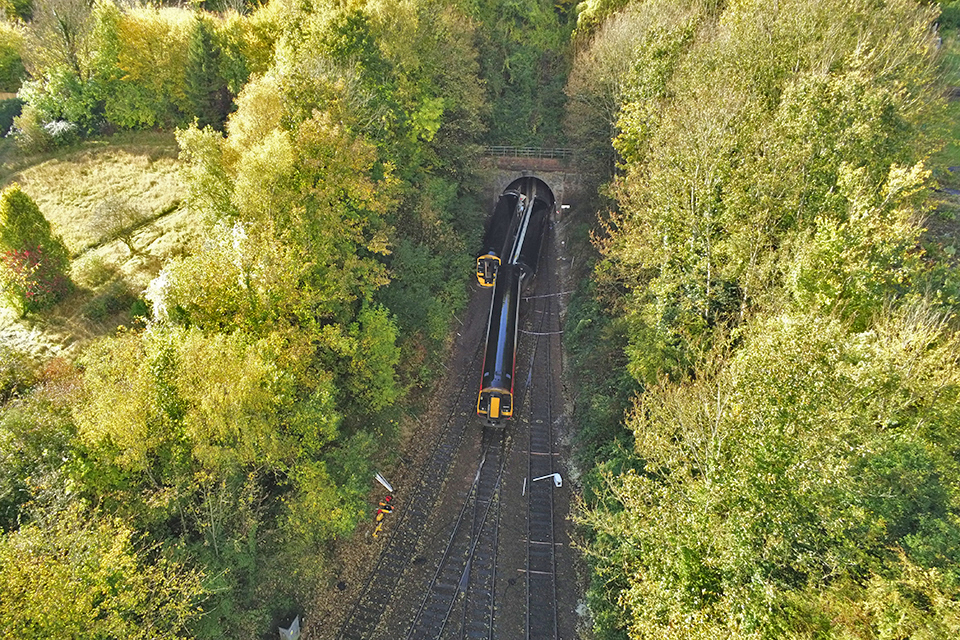
- Salisbury
  31 October – United Kingdom – 2021 Salisbury rail crash: Two trains collided in Fisherton Tunnel, 1 mile (1.6 km) north of Salisbury railway station, after one of them failed to stop at a red signal. 14 people, including a train driver, were hospitalized.
- 16 November – Greece – In Athens, a grinding locomotive train crashed head-on at a subway train near Attiki Station, killing one person and injuring two.
- 9 December – United States – In Darby, Pennsylvania, a SEPTA trolley train crashed into a CSX train, injuring six.
- 22 December – Iran – A Tehran Metro train crashed into another train after passing a red signal, injuring 22.

== 2022 ==
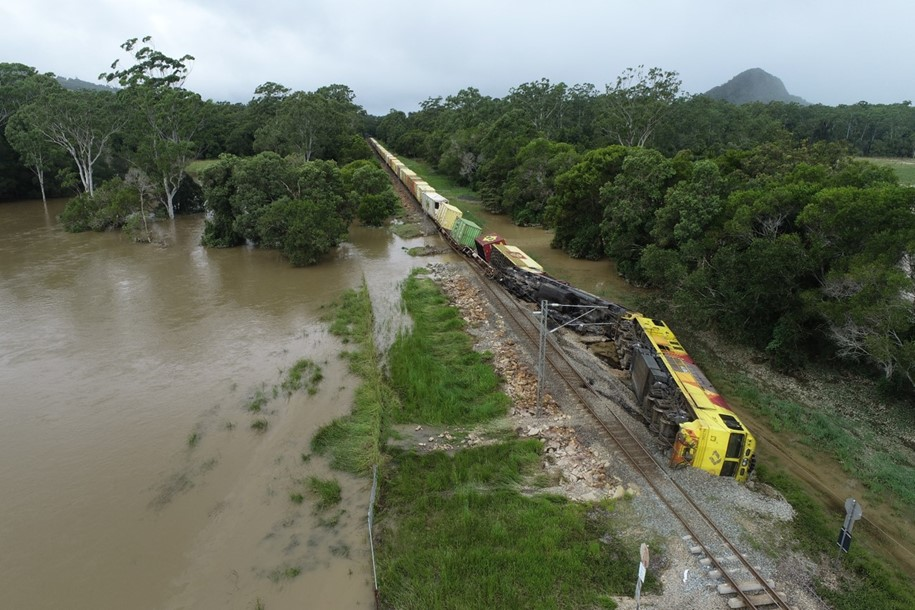
Freight train Y279, Traveston, Queensland

- 5 January – South Korea – A KTX train headed from Busan to Seoul derailed in the central part of the country, injuring seven.
- 9 January – United States – A Metrolink train collided with a Cessna 172 Skyhawk plane in Pacoima, Los Angeles, California, destroying the aircraft. The Skyhawk had suffered an engine failure after take-off from Whiteman Airport, Los Angeles and landed on the railway. The pilot, who was injured in the initial crash-landing, was rescued from the aircraft prior to the train collision.
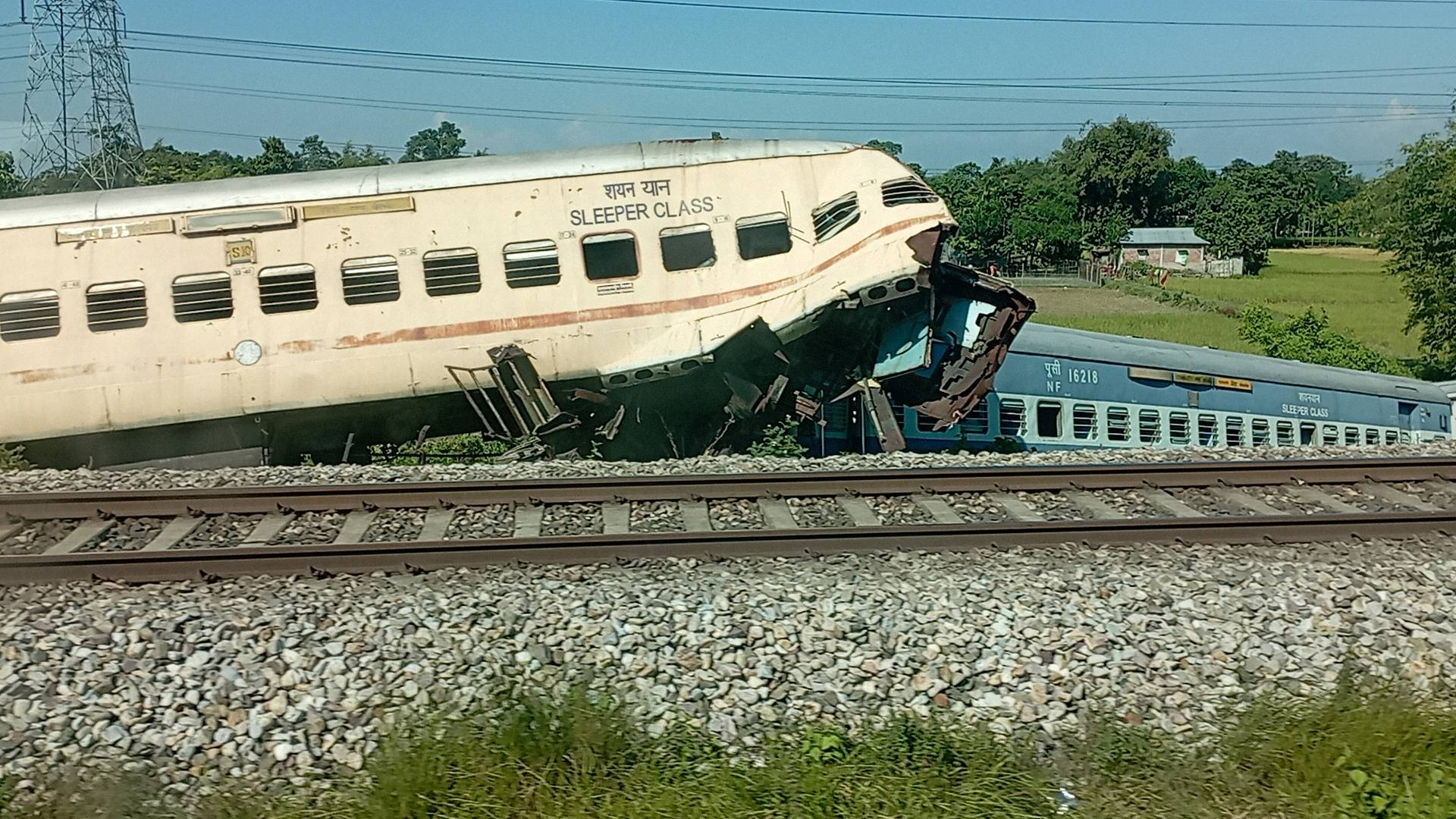
- Bikaner–Guwahati Express derailment
  13 January – India – Bikaner–Guwahati Express derailment – The Bikaner–Guwahati Express train derailed near Domohani, Mainaguri, Jalpaiguri district, killing nine and injuring 45.
- 14 February – Germany – Two Munich S-Bahn trains collided near Ebenhausen-Schäftlarn station, killing one person and injuring 14.
- 20 February – United States – In Spencer, Massachusetts, a Loram Rail Grinder train collided with a stopped CSX train head-on, injuring three people.
- 23 February – Australia – In Traveston, Queensland, an Aurizon Freight train Y279 derailed due to a flood, injuring one.
- 8 March – Argentina – A passenger train derailed 10 kilometers from Olavarria, Buenos Aires Province. 21 people were slightly injured.
- 10 March – United States – A southbound Caltrain train struck three hi-rail construction vehicles in San Bruno, California, causing the locomotive to derail and ignite a fire. 8 people were injured.
- 11 March – Democratic Republic of the Congo – 2022 Lualaba train accident – A train derailed in Lualaba Province killing 61 people.
- 21 March – Tunisia – A head-on collision between two passenger trains caused 95 injuries in the south of Tunis, near Djebel Jelloud.
- 21 March – United States – In Colton, California, 13 cars of a Union Pacific train derailed, injuring one.
- 3 April – India – In Maharashtra, a train derailed between Lahavit and Devlali, injuring two.
- 4 April – Democratic Republic of the Congo – A train derailed in Lualaba Province, killing seven and injuring 14.
- 5 April – Hungary – A train collided with a pickup truck, killing five and injuring ten.
- 10 April – United States – A passenger was caught in the door of an MBTA Red Line train and dragged down the platform to his death.
- 13 April – China – A cargo train on the Daqin railway slipped away from main track and rear-ended another cargo train in Jizhou District, Tianjin.
- 9 May – Austria – Münchendorf derailment – In Mödling, a passenger train derailed, killing one and injuring several.
- 16 May – Spain – A freight train derailed and collided with a passenger train during rush hour in Barcelona. The driver of the passenger train was killed, while over 80 passengers were injured.
- 19 May – Germany – Two freight trains collided near Münster, Hesse, killing one of the drivers.
- 24 May – Germany – In Berlin, a passenger train struck a bus at a railroad crossing and derailed, no deaths were reported but four people were injured.
- 26 May – United States – In Pittsburgh, Pennsylvania, a Norfolk Southern train derailed at a bridge over the Allegheny River, causing part of the bridge to collapse. Two people were injured.
- 1 June – New Zealand – In Auckland, a KiwiRail locomotive train derailed and rolled onto its side, injuring three.
- 3 June – Germany – Garmisch-Partenkirchen train derailment ‒ A double-decker passenger train derailed in Bavaria, killing five and injuring 68.
- 4 June
  - China – Guiyang-Guangzhou high-speed railway train D2809 derailed near Rongjiang Station in Rongjiang County after hitting a mudslide. The train driver was killed and 13 were injured.
  - Slovakia – In Vrutky, a locomotive crashed into a stationary passenger train, injuring 74.
- 8 June – Iran – A passenger train traveling from Tabas to Yazd crashed into an excavator and derailed in South Khorasan, killing 18 and injuring 87.
- 13 June – Spain – A locomotive collided with a passenger train in Vila-seca, Catalonia, injuring 22.
- 23 June – Egypt – In Cairo, a freight train going from El-Salam to El-Bostan derailed, killing one.
- 27 June
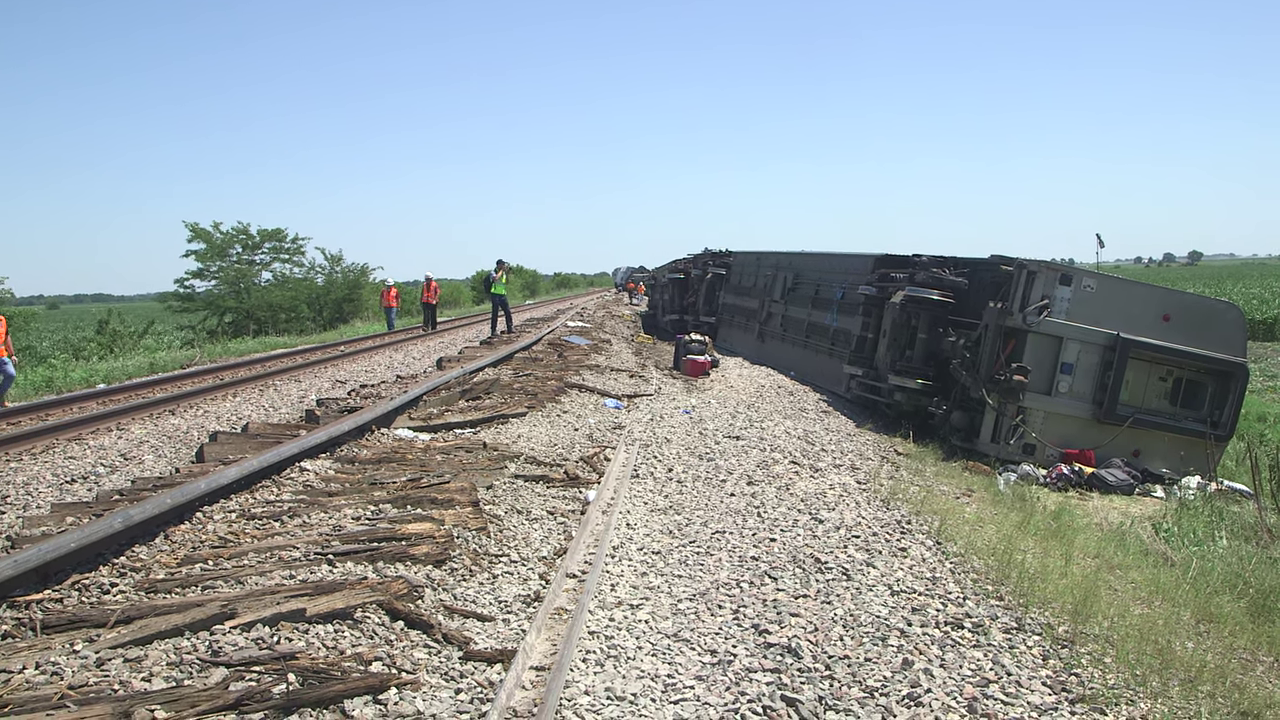
  - 2022 Missouri train derailment
    United States – 2022 Missouri train derailment ‒ An Amtrak Southwest Chief passenger train collided with a dump truck obstructing a crossing in Mendon, Missouri, derailing eight cars and two locomotives. Four people were killed (three on board the train and the truck driver) and 40 were hospitalized.
  - Czech Republic – In Bohumín, a high-speed passenger train crashed into another locomotive, killing the former's driver and injuring five people.
- 11 July – United States – In Columbia, South Carolina, a Norfolk Southern Train collided with another train. One of the trains spilled fuel. Two people were injured.
- 22 July – United States – An MBTA Orange Line train burst into flames on the bridge over the Mystic River. No injuries were reported, and a woman swam to shore.
- 27 July – Indonesia – 2022 Serang train crash, a train crashed into an odong-odong (a minibus that carries people, most often children, for amusement purposes), killing nine and injuring several.
- 30 July – Bangladesh – In Chittagong District, a train crashed into a bus at a railroad crossing, killing 11 people and injuring five.
- 5 August – United States – In Milwaukie, Oregon, a MAX Light Rail Train crashed into a buffer after failing to stop at a station, injuring three.
- 17 August – India – In Maharashtra, a passenger train crashed into a freight train due to signalling issues, injuring 50.
- 18 August – Spain – In Castellón, a train caught fire while reversing from a wildfire, injuring 20.
- 31 August – United States – In El Paso, Texas, a Union Pacific train crashed into a derailment device that was on the tracks near the Alfalfa railroad yard. Two cars derailed killing a train conductor. One car broke a household gas line, prompting an evacuation of nearby houses.
- 2 September – Egypt – In the Nile Delta, a passenger train crashed into a bus, killing three and injuring several.
- 8 September – United States – In Mecca, California, near the Salton Sea, a Union Pacific Train was accidentally routed onto a track that held railcars being stored, the Union Pacific train then crashed into the cars on the siding. Two people were killed.
- 9 September – Croatia – In Novska, a freight train crashed into a passenger train, killing three people and injuring 11.
- 17 September – Taiwan – 2022 Taitung earthquakes, In Taitung County, a passenger train was derailed by an earthquake, injuring one.
- 23 September – United States – In Denver, Colorado, an RTD L Line Train derailed at excessive speed and split into two, injuring three people.
- 24 September – United States – In Miami-Dade County, Florida, two CSX trains crashed into each other near Miami International Airport, injuring four.
- 8 October – United States – In Sandusky, Ohio, a Norfolk Southern freight train derailed and dropped 20 tanker cars of paraffin wax into a road underpass.
- 16 October – United States – In Philadelphia, a PATCO Speedline Train crashed into construction workers on the Ben Franklin Bridge, killing two.
- 3 November – United States – In Baltimore, an empty Baltimore Light RailLink Train was hijacked. The train switched onto another track and later crashed into an opposite train. The hijacker was later arrested, several people were injured.
- 5 November – South Korea – In Seoul, a Korail train heading to Iksan station in North Jeolla Province derailed, injuring 30 people.
- 21 November – India – In Odisha, a freight train derailed at Korai railway station, killing three and injuring two.
- 28 November – United States – In Clewiston, Florida, a CSX freight train carrying 46 empty cars derailed after crashing into a truck, killing one.
- 7 December – Spain – Montcada i Reixac rail crash – Two trains collided near Barcelona, injuring 155 people.
- 18 December – Indonesia – In Cempaka Mekar, West Java, a freight train derailed due to work negligence, killing two and injuring five.
- 25 December – Serbia – In Pirot, a freight train carrying ammonia derailed causing the ammonia to leak. Two people died and 51 were hospitalized.
- 26 December – United States - In Baltimore, Maryland, a Baltimore Metro SubwayLink train partially derailed, injuring five.

== 2023 ==
- 2 January – India – In Rajasthan, a Suryanagri Express Train derailed, injuring 26 people.
- 7 January – Mexico – 2023 Mexico City Metro train crash: A Mexico City Metro train rear-ended another train between Potrero and La Raza stations along Line 3. One person was killed and 57 others were injured.
- 20 January – Austria – Two freight trains collided in Furnitz, Carinthia, spilling approximately 60,000 liters of kerosene. One of the trains burst into flames afterward. Both drivers suffered minor injuries.
- 28 January – United States – In Keachi, Louisiana, a Union Pacific train derailed, spilling more than 10,000 US gallons (38,000 L) of acid products, leading to the evacuation of part of the town. Officials reported 10,000 US gallons of acetic anhydride and less than 1,000 US gallons (3800 L) of propionic acid were spilled.
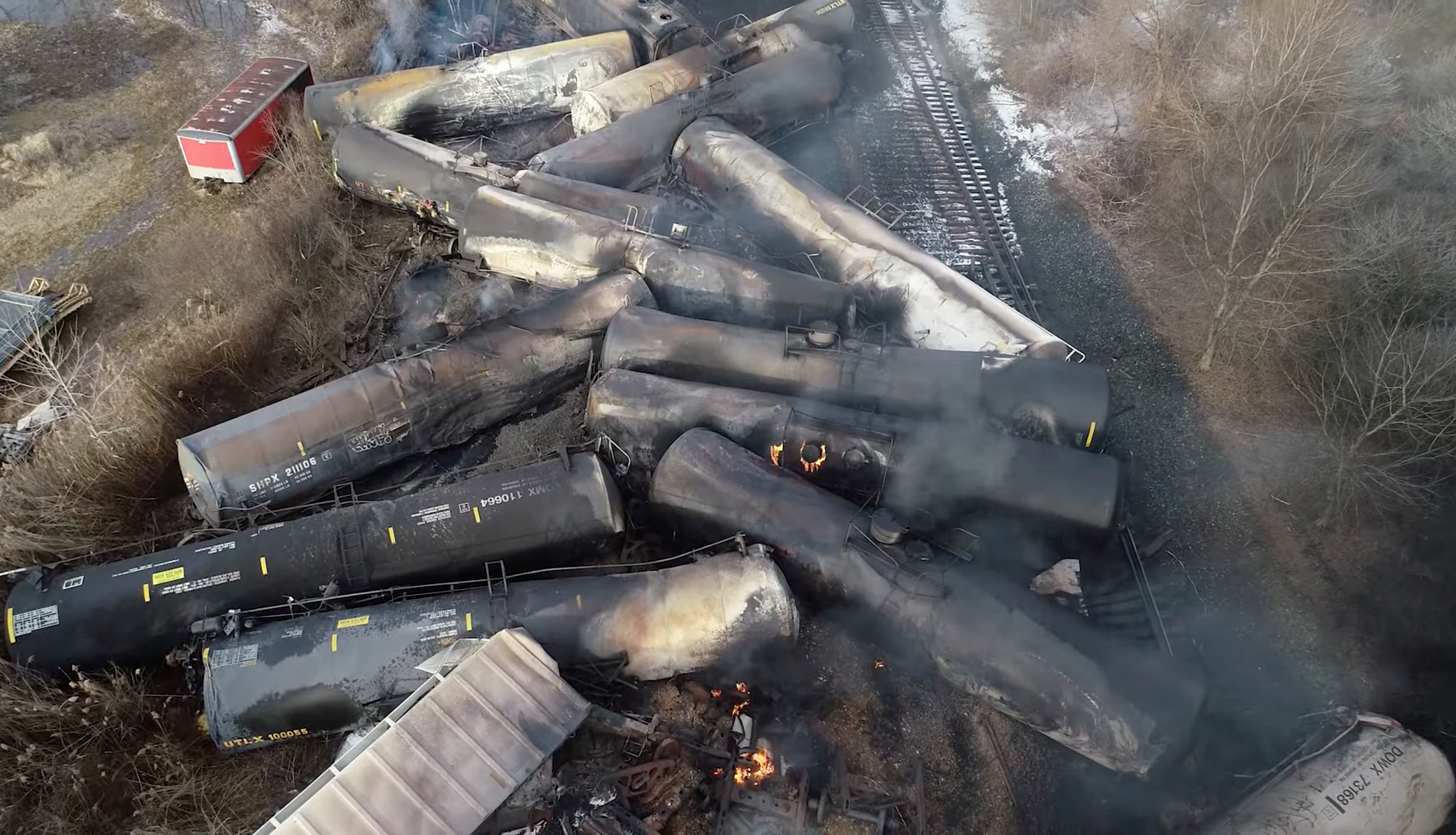
- 2023 Ohio train derailment
  3 February – United States – East Palestine, Ohio, train derailment: In East Palestine, Ohio, a Norfolk Southern freight train derailed and spilled toxic chemicals, primarily vinyl chloride and butyl acrylate. The crash resulted in the evacuation of the area and activation of the Ohio National Guard.
- 28 February – Greece – Tempi train crash: Outside Larissa, a passenger Hellenic Train collided head-on with a freight train, killing at least 57 people and injuring over 85 people.
- 7 March – Egypt – Two people were killed and 16 others injured after a passenger train crashed into a station platform in Qalyub.
- 8 March – United States – Near Sandstone, West Virginia, 4 locomotives and 22 cars of an empty CSX coal train derailed after colliding with a rockslide that was blocking the track, injuring the 3 crew members on board. One locomotive ended up in the New River, spilling "an unknown amount" of diesel fuel.
- 9 March – Nigeria – A train crashed into a government staff bus at the Shogunle Level Crossing in Lagos killing six and injuring 97.
- 17 March – United States – In Anacortes, Washington, two BNSF Railway locomotives derailed and spilled more than 3,000 US gallons (11,360 L) of diesel fuel. Clean-up crews had to remove 2,100 cubic yards (1600 m^{3}) of contaminated soil and 4,300 US gallons (16,280 L) of contaminated groundwater.
- 25 March – Romania – In Galați, a locomotive ran into a car at high speed, killing one and injuring three.
- 26 March – United States – Near Wyndmere, North Dakota, 31 cars were derailed from a Canadian Pacific train, with some of those cars carrying liquid asphalt.
- 27 March – United States – In San Bernardino County, California near Kelso, a runaway UP train derailed, spilling iron ore.
- 30 March – United States – In Raymond, Minnesota, a BNSF train transporting ethanol derailed, causing a fire. Surrounding areas were affected by a mandatory evacuation.
- 2 April – India – In Kerala, a passenger train caught on fire after an oil incident on an Alappuzha-Kannur Express train. Three people were killed and dozens were injured.
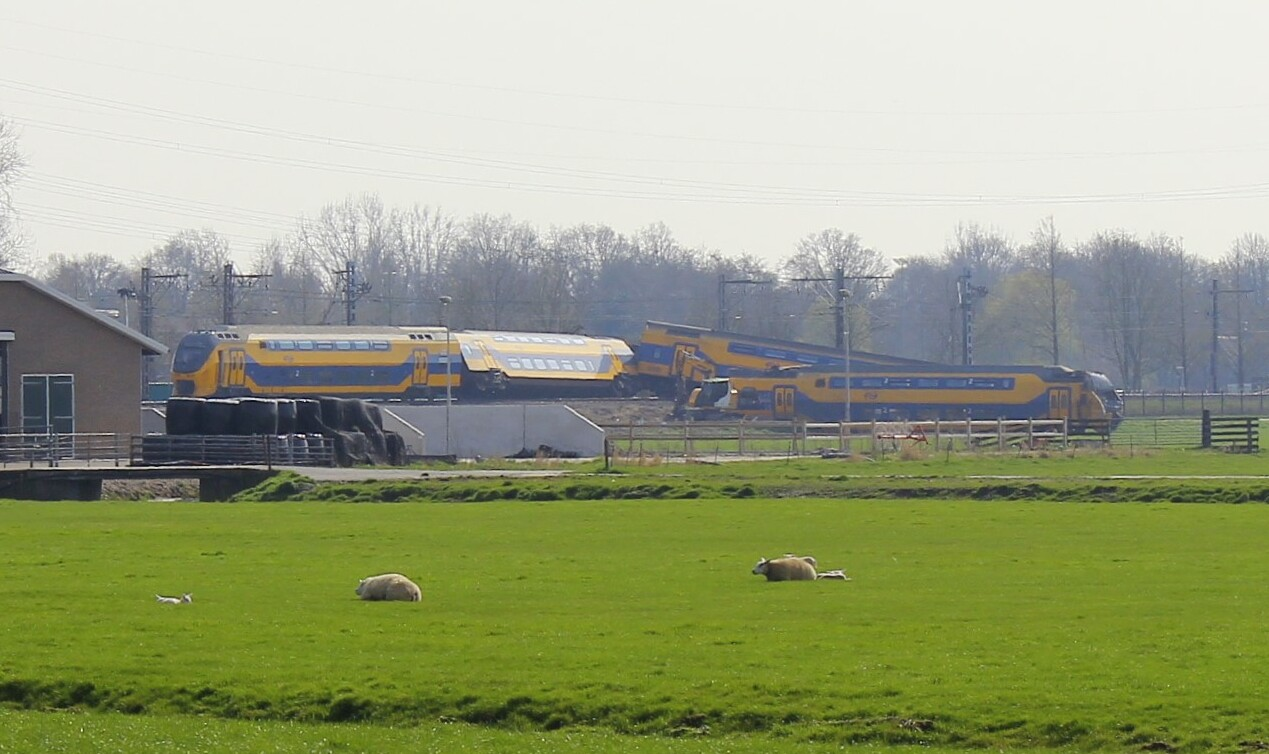
- 2023 Voorschoten train crash
  4 April – Netherlands – 2023 Voorschoten train crash: A passenger train collided with construction equipment and derailed at Voorschoten. One person was killed and 30 were injured. A freight train also collided with the construction equipment.
- 15 April – United States – A CPKC train hauling lumber, electrical wiring, and various other materials derailed southwest of Rockwood, Maine, causing a small fire. The train included hazardous materials, which were involved in the fire. Three locomotives involved in the accident spilled diesel fuel and three crew members onboard escaped with minor injuries.
- 27 April
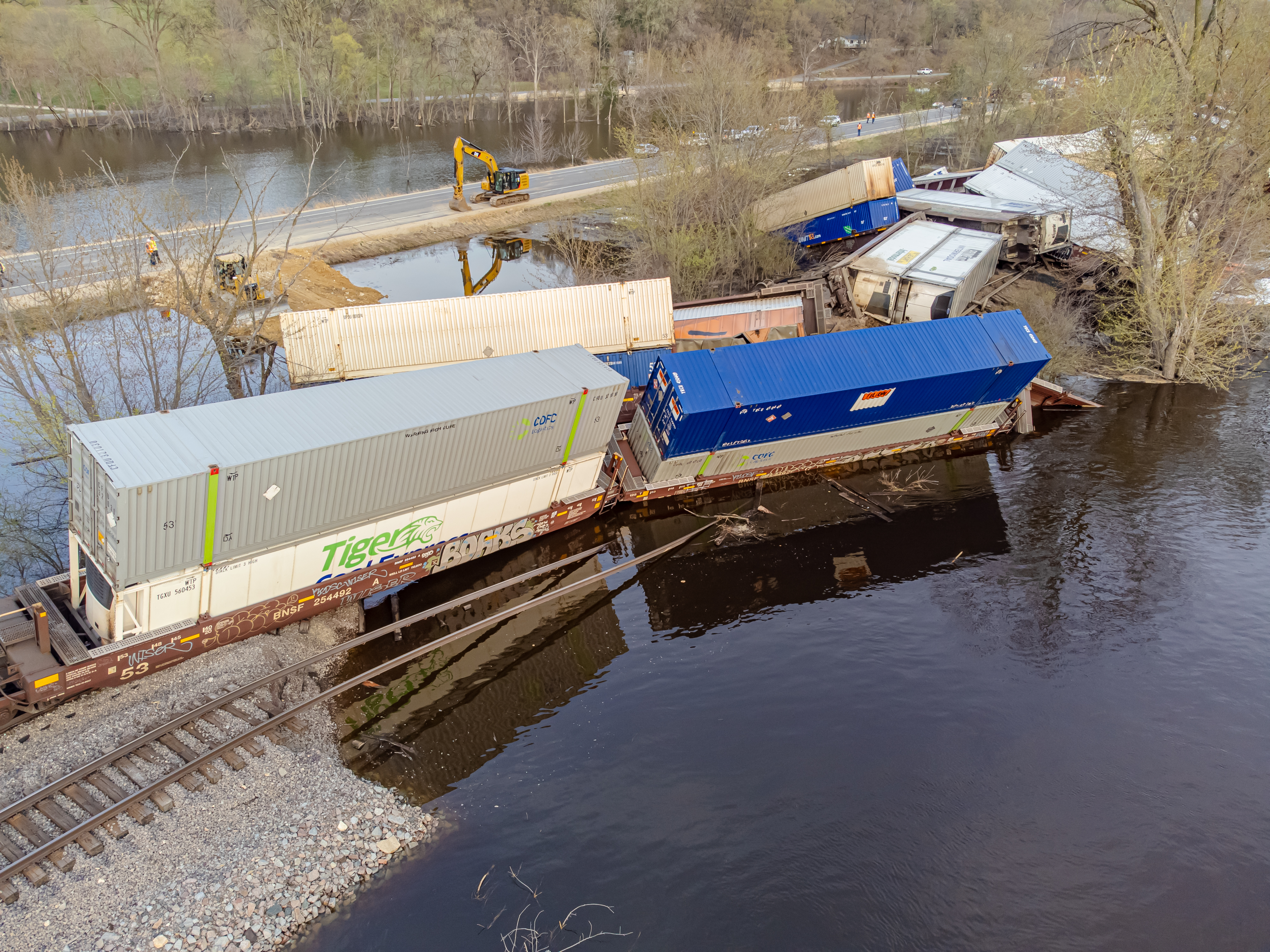
  - Derailment in De Soto, Wisconsin
    United States – Near De Soto, Wisconsin, an intermodal BNSF train derailed, spilling paint into the Mississippi River.
  - Pakistan – 2023 Karachi Express train fire, In Sindh, a Karachi Express train caught fire while on route from Karachi to Lahore, killing seven.
- 4 May – Germany – An Intercity Express train traveling from Emden to Koblenz hit a group of railway workers near Cologne, killing two.
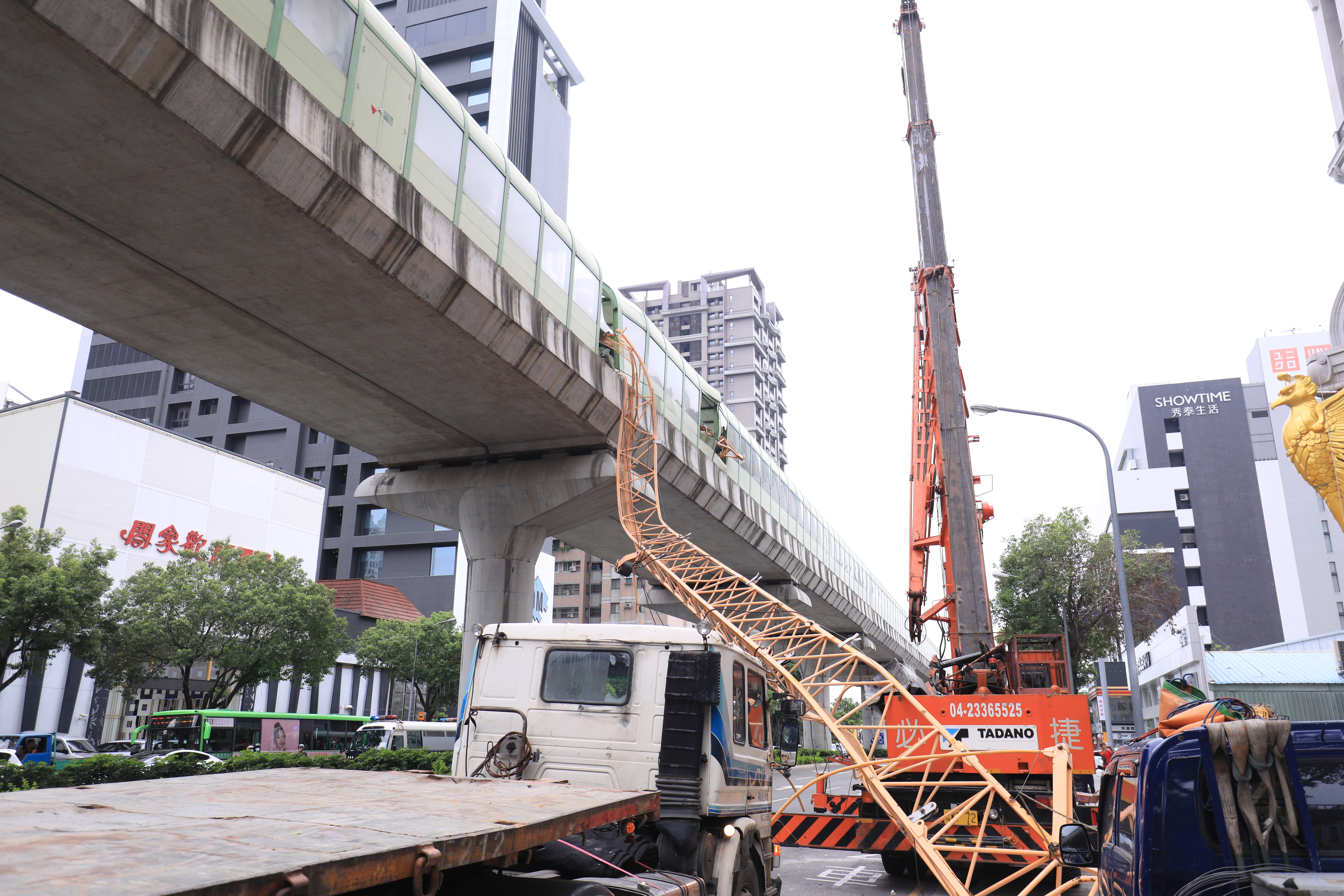
- 2023 Taichung crane collapse
  10 May – Taiwan – 2023 Taichung crane collapse, In Taichung, a crane collapsed 30 floors onto a moving Taichung MRT Green line Taichung MRT train, killing one and injuring 10.
- 15 May – India – A Double Decker Express train travelling from Chennai to Bangalore derailed in Tirupati, injuring one.
- 27 May – Sweden – An Arlanda Express train derailed near Stockholm Arlanda Airport, injuring two.
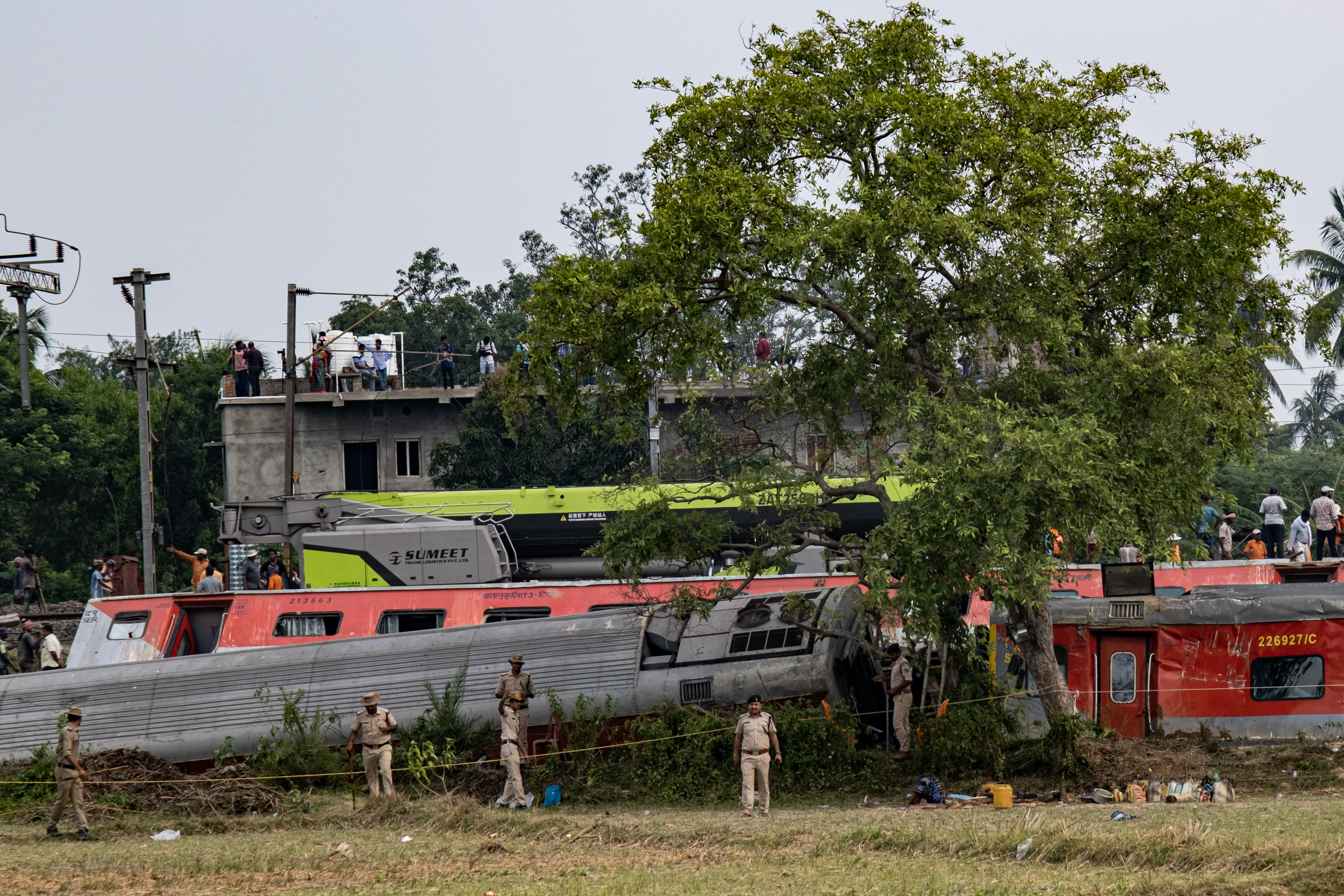
- Train Collision in Odisha
  2 June – India – 2023 Odisha train collision: In Balasore, Odisha, three trains collided into each other, killing at least 296 people and injuring more than 1,200 others.
- 8 June – Austria – A passenger train caught fire in the Terfner Tunnel. Thirty-three people were hospitalized.
- 9 June – Turkey – In Samsun, two trams collided with each other, injuring 26 people.
- 21 June
  - Tunisia – In Tunis, a passenger train derailed after experiencing a signaling fault at a level crossing, two people were killed and 34 people were injured.
  - Czech Republic – In Liberec, a passenger train collided with a truck at a railroad crossing. 21 train passengers were injured.
- 24 June
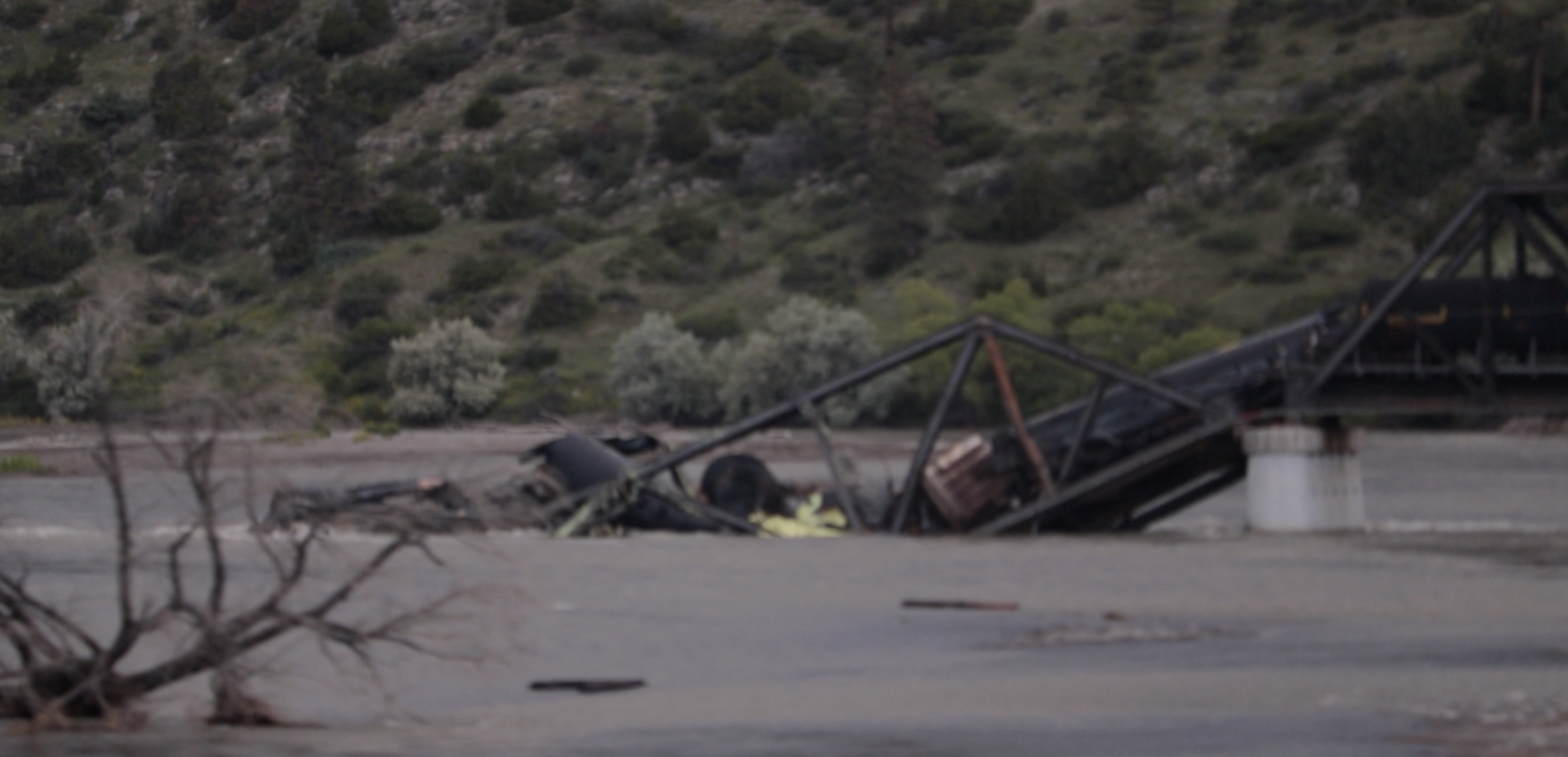
  - 2023 Yellowstone River train derailment
    United States – 2023 Yellowstone River train derailment: A Montana Rail Link (company leasing BNSF routes) freight train derailed near Reed Point, Montana, and eight cars fell into the Yellowstone River. A few cars ruptured and leaked hazardous materials including petroleum products into the river.
  - India – In Agra, a goods train derailed after a collision with a truck, injuring six.
- 25 June – India – In West Bengal, two freight trains collided at Onda station in Bankura, injuring six people.
- 28 June – United States – In Moorpark, California, an Amtrak train derailed after striking a water truck, injuring 16.
- 11 July – United States – An Amtrak train derailed near Washington Union Station, injuring one person.
- 16 July – United States – In Polk County, Florida, an Amtrak Silver Star train struck a semi-trailer truck and partially derailed, injuring eight.
- 18 July – Indonesia – In Madukuro, Semarang, a Brantas intercity train struck a semi-trailer truck and exploded, injuring one.
- 24 July – Canada – In Toronto, the linear induction motor reaction rail on the Toronto Transit Commission's Line 3 Scarborough subway came apart due to failed bolts, derailing the last car of a train near Ellesmere station. Five people were treated for minor injuries. As the line had been scheduled to close permanently in November 2023 anyway, the TTC instead decided not to reopen it after the accident.
- 2 August – Mexico – In El Marqués, Queretaro, a train smashed into a commuter bus at a level crossing, killing seven people and injuring 17.
- 3 August – United States – In Queens, New York, a Long Island Rail Road commuter train derailed east of Jamaica station, injuring 13 people.
- 4 August – Thailand – In Chachoengsao, a freight train struck a pickup truck, killing eight people and injuring four.
- 6 August – Pakistan – 2023 Hazara Express derailment – In Nawabshah, the Hazara Express derailed near Sarhari railway station, killing at least 34 passengers and injuring 100.
- 7 August – Sweden – A passenger train derailed between Iggesund and Hudiksvall due to the trackbed being washed out by floods, injuring three people.
- 10 August – Switzerland – A freight train derailed in the Gotthard Base Tunnel, damaging 8 kilometres (5.0 mi) of track and closing the tunnel until September 2024.
- 19 August – India – In Bangalore, an Udyan Express train caught on fire at Bangalore City railway station, one person was injured.
- 26 August – India – At Madurai station, a passenger train car caught fire killing 10 people and injuring dozens.
- 30 August – Italy – A train hit workers replacing segments of the railway tracks in Brandizzo, killing five of them and injuring two others.
- 1 September – Chile – 2023 San Pedro de la Paz railway accident: A Biotren Line 2 train struck a bus that did not yield at a railroad crossing in San Pedro de la Paz, killing eight people and injuring 11.
- 10 September – Germany – A freight train derailed while entering Geseke station, killing the train driver.
- 24 September – Pakistan – In Sheikhupura, a passenger train collided with a freight train. The cause of the crash was a track switch failure which caused the moving train to crash into the parked train on the same track. Thirty-one people were injured.
- 28 September
  - India – In Mathura, a MEMU train collided with a buffer at Mathura Junction railway station while the driver was drunk and watching his phone. The driver also put his backpack on the throttle, one person was injured.
  - Australia – In Nicholls, a miniature train at Cockington Green Gardens derailed due to excessive speed, four people were injured.
- 29 September – United Kingdom – At Aviemore Station on the Strathspey Railway, the Flying Scotsman collided with a stationary train. Two people were hospitalized.
- 4 October
  - Hong Kong – Two Light rail trains collided with each other due to human error, injuring three.
  - Poland – In Gdynia, two passenger trains collided with each other, five people were injured.
- 11 October – India – In Bihar, a North East Express train derailed due to a fault in the train tracks. Four people were killed and 30 people were injured.
- 16 October – United States – In Pueblo, Colorado, a BNSF freight train derailed on a bridge over Interstate 25, causing the bridge to collapse. As a result, several freight cars fell onto the highway. One person was killed and another was injured.
- 17 October – Indonesia – In Sentolo, Kulon Progo, between Wates and Sentolo stations, the Argo Semeru train derailed, at the same time from the opposite direction the Argo Wilis train hit the rear carriage of Argo Semeru, injuring several people.
- 23 October – Bangladesh – 2023 Dhaka rail collision – In Dhaka, a freight train collided with a passenger train parked in front of it, killing 17 and injuring 100.
- 29 October – India – Vizianagaram train collision – In Andhra Pradesh, two passenger trains collided due to human error, killing 13 people and injuring 50.
- 15 November – United States – In Portland, Oregon, a MAX Light Rail train collided with a Portland Streetcar train, causing both to derail. Two people were injured, including the streetcar operator.
- 16 November
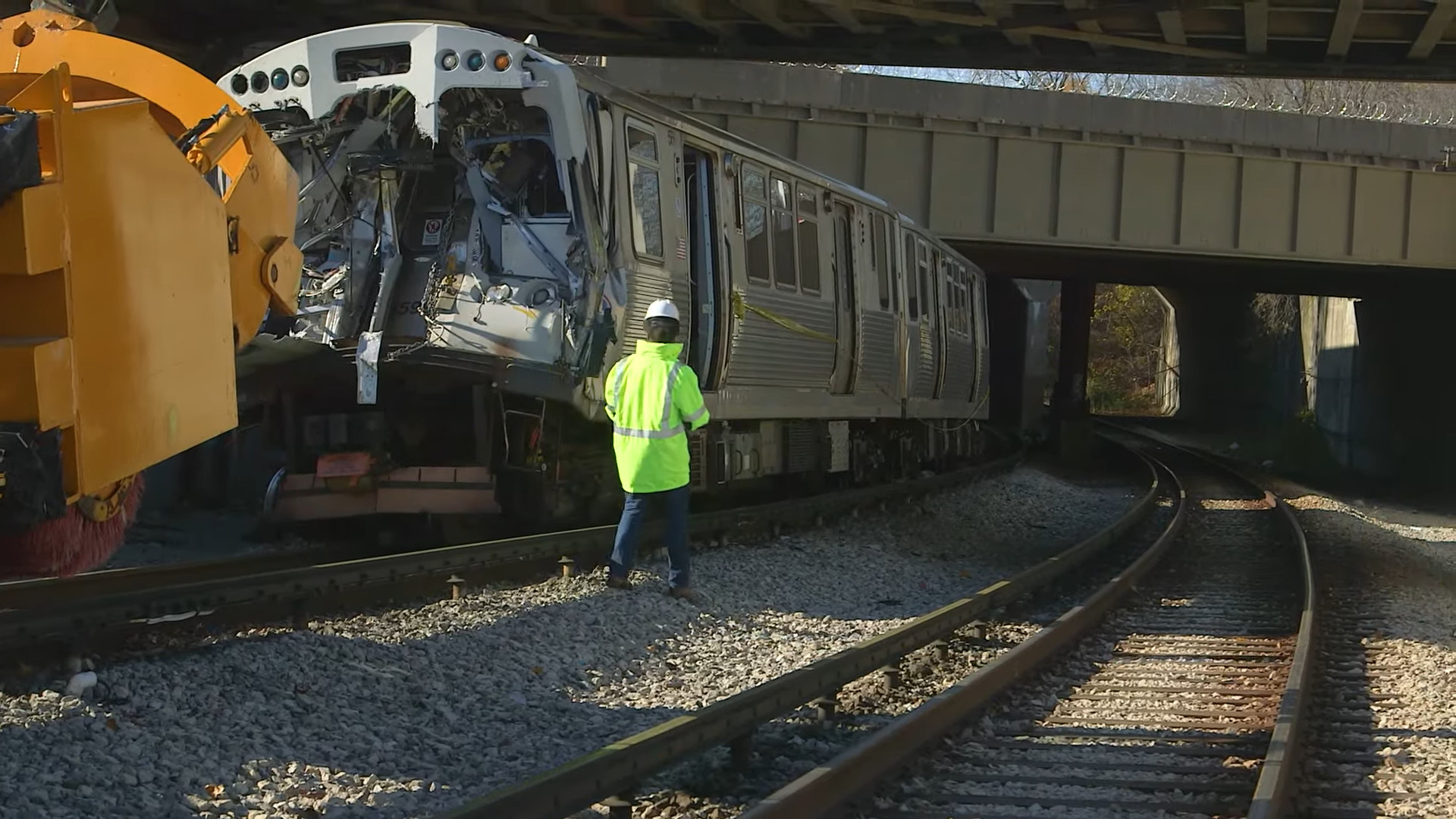
  - 2023 Chicago train crash
    United States – 2023 Chicago train crash: In Chicago, a two-car CTA Yellow Line 5000-series train rear-ended a snow removal work train at a curve near Howard station in the Rogers Park neighborhood, injuring 38 people (23 of which were hospitalized, including four children).
  - India – In Uttar Pradesh, a Vaishali Express train caught fire at 2:40 AM in Etawah, 21 people were injured.
- 17 November – United States – In Atlanta, Georgia, a Norfolk Southern train collided with a CSX train, causing a derailment and a fire. Diesel fuel was also spilled. One person was injured.
- 21 November – Canada – In Montreal a locomotive collided with the back of a commuter train, injuring six people. A 2025 investigation discovered that the locomotive applied emergency brakes but the distance and speed were unavoidable.
- 23 November – United States – 2023 Kentucky train derailment, In Rockcastle County, Kentucky, a freight train derailed, spilling toxic chemicals and causing a fire.
- 6 December – Australia – In Murrumbo, New South Wales, approximately 80 km west of Muswellbrook an empty coal train derailed, starting a grassfire that was controlled in the following days.
- 10 December – Italy – In Faenza, a Frecciarossa train collided with another passenger train, 17 were injured.
- 14 December – China – 2023 Beijing Subway collision: In Beijing, a Beijing Subway train rear-ended another due to slippery track conditions, injuring 515.
- 26 December – North Korea – In Tanchon, a passenger train travelling from Pyongyang to Kumgol derailed while going up a steep slope, killing 400.
- 31 December – Australia – A collision between a truck and freight train occurred in Bindarrah, South Australia, killing two people on the train. The truck driver was uninjured.

== 2024 ==
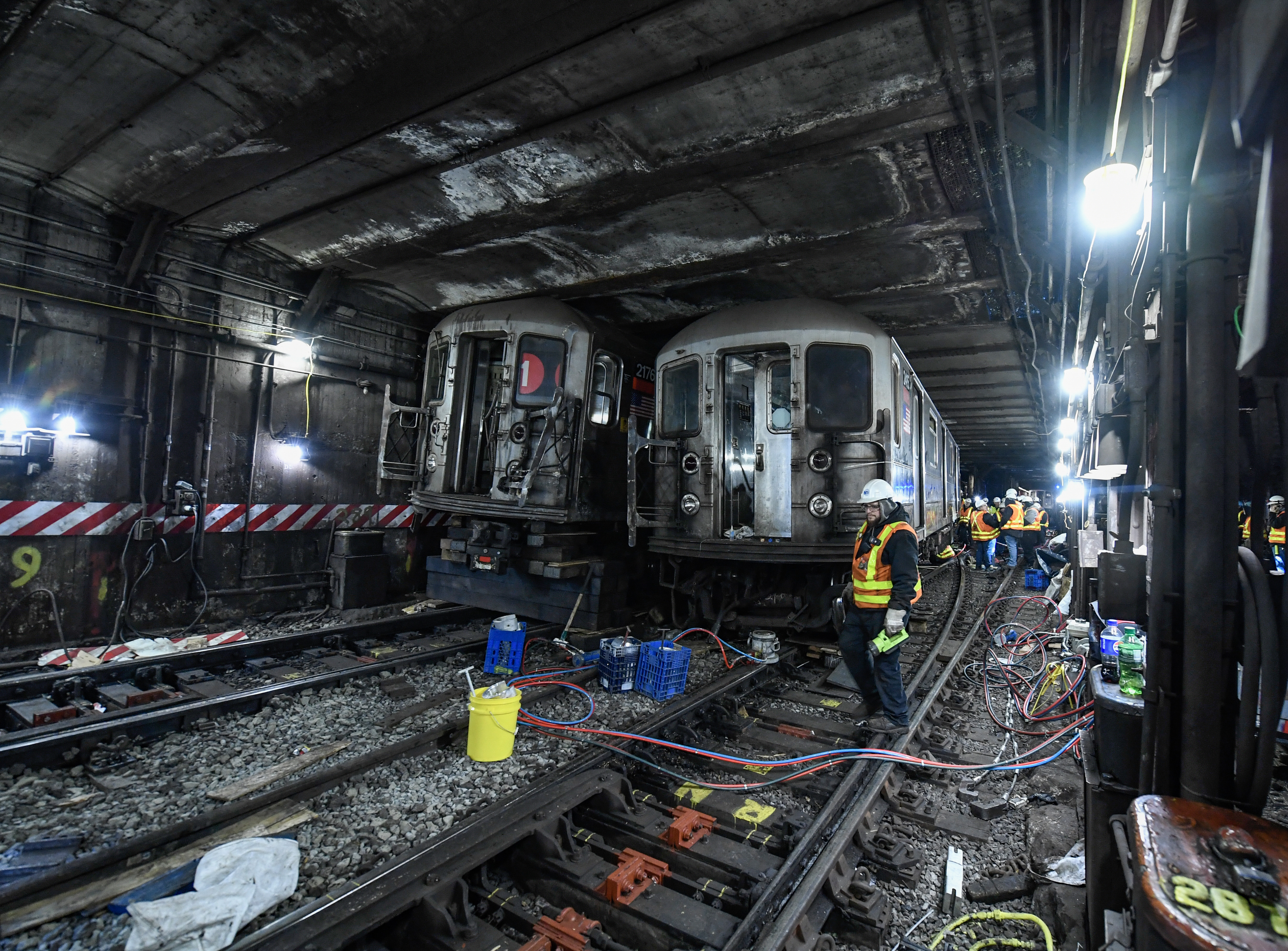
- 2024 New York City Subway derailment
  4 January – United States – 2024 New York City Subway derailment: In Manhattan, two New York City Subway trains collided just north of West 96th Street station. The collision caused one train to derail on impact and 24 people were injured.
- 5 January
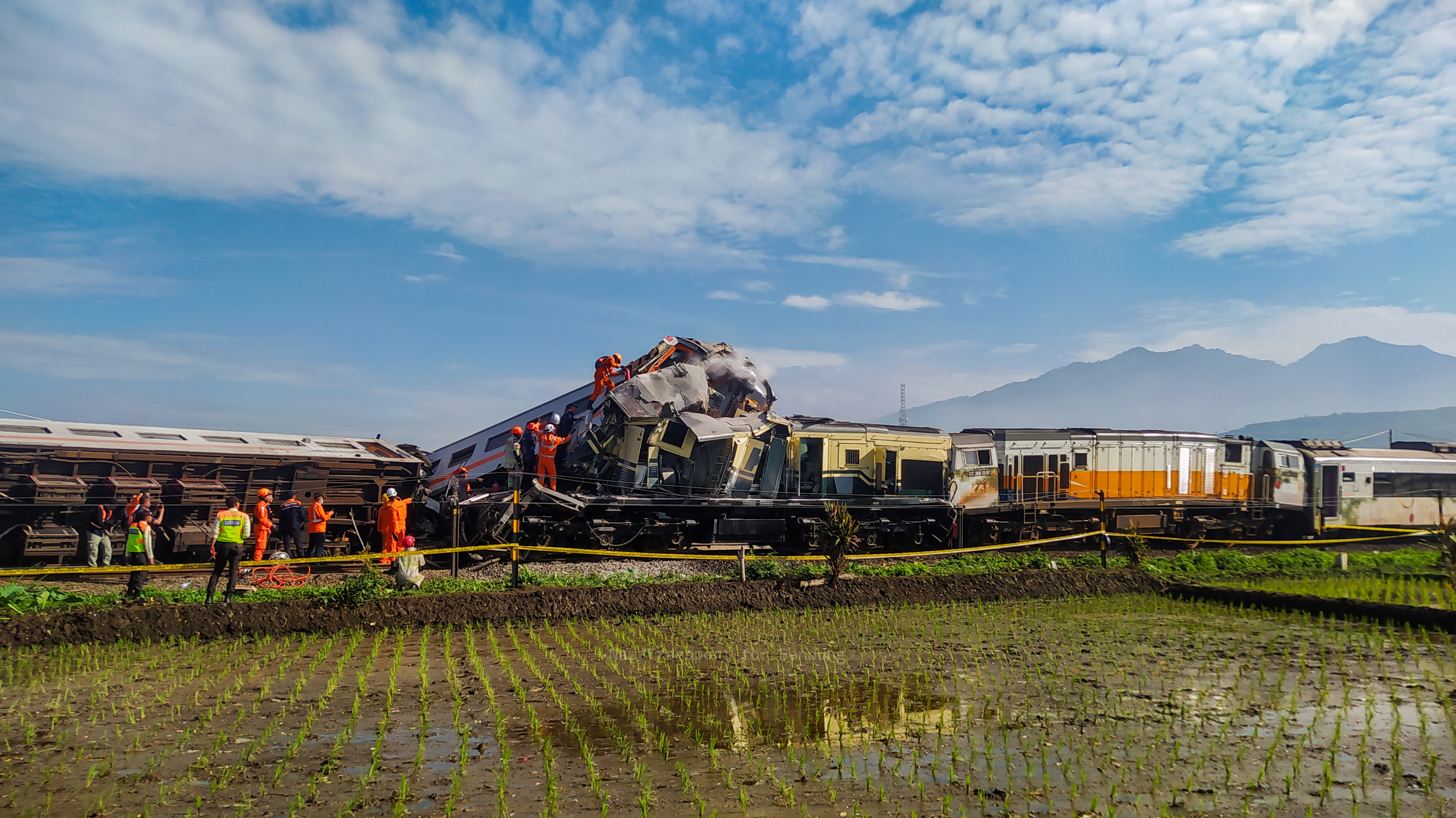
  - 2024 Cicalengka railway collision, taken from 25 meters away
    Indonesia – 2024 Cicalengka station railway collision: Two trains collided near Cicalengka railway station in Bandung, killing four people and injuring 37 others.
  - Bangladesh – In the Gopibagh area of Dhaka, an inbound Benapole Express train caught fire in a suspected arson attack. Five people were killed and several others were injured.
  - United States – In Vernon County, Missouri, a freight train derailed, sending some cars smashing into a house. One person was injured.
- 10 January – India – In Telangana, three cars of a Charminar Express train derailed at Nampally Train Station. Five people were injured.
- 20 January – Thailand – A train going from Bangkok to Chiang Mai collided with a truck carrying a backhoe at a crossing near Chum Saeng district, Nakhon Sawan province, killing the train driver and injuring five people.
- 24 January – Czech Republic – A fast train heading to Prague collided with a truck at a level crossing near Bohumín, killing the train driver and injuring 19 people.
- 6 February – United Kingdom – An East Midlands Railway train derailed between Thetford and Harling Road after colliding with a tree, injuring one person.
- 2 March – United States – In Lower Saucon Township, Pennsylvania, three Norfolk Southern trains collided, spilling polypropylene pellets from one train car into the Lehigh River. The incident occurred when an eastbound train was stopped on the tracks, and was hit by another train; a westbound train crashed into the wreckage.
- 6 March – United States – In Bonners Ferry, Idaho, two Union Pacific trains collided, injuring one person.
- 18 March – India – In Rajasthan, a passenger train collided with a freight train in Ajmer. Several people were injured.
- 27 March – United Kingdom – In Nottingham, a tram train derailed, causing it to strike a pole. One person was injured.
- 1 April – Russia – In Yaroslavl, a train collided with a bus at a level crossing. Eight people were killed.
- 15 April – United States – Two CSX trains collided in Folkston, Georgia, injuring three people.
- 30 April – United States – In Los Angeles, an E Line Los Angeles Metro train collided with a USC bus at a railroad crossing, 50 people were injured.
- 10 May – Argentina – In Buenos Aires, a commuter train collided with a stationary box car in the tracks and derailed, 90 people were injured.
- 26 May – Peru – In La Oroya, a freight train collided with a bus at a level crossing, four people were killed and 30 people were injured.
- 31 May – Russia – In Amur Oblast, a cargo train carrying coal derailed along the Trans-Siberian Railway between Seletkan and Ledyanaya, causing a wildfire.
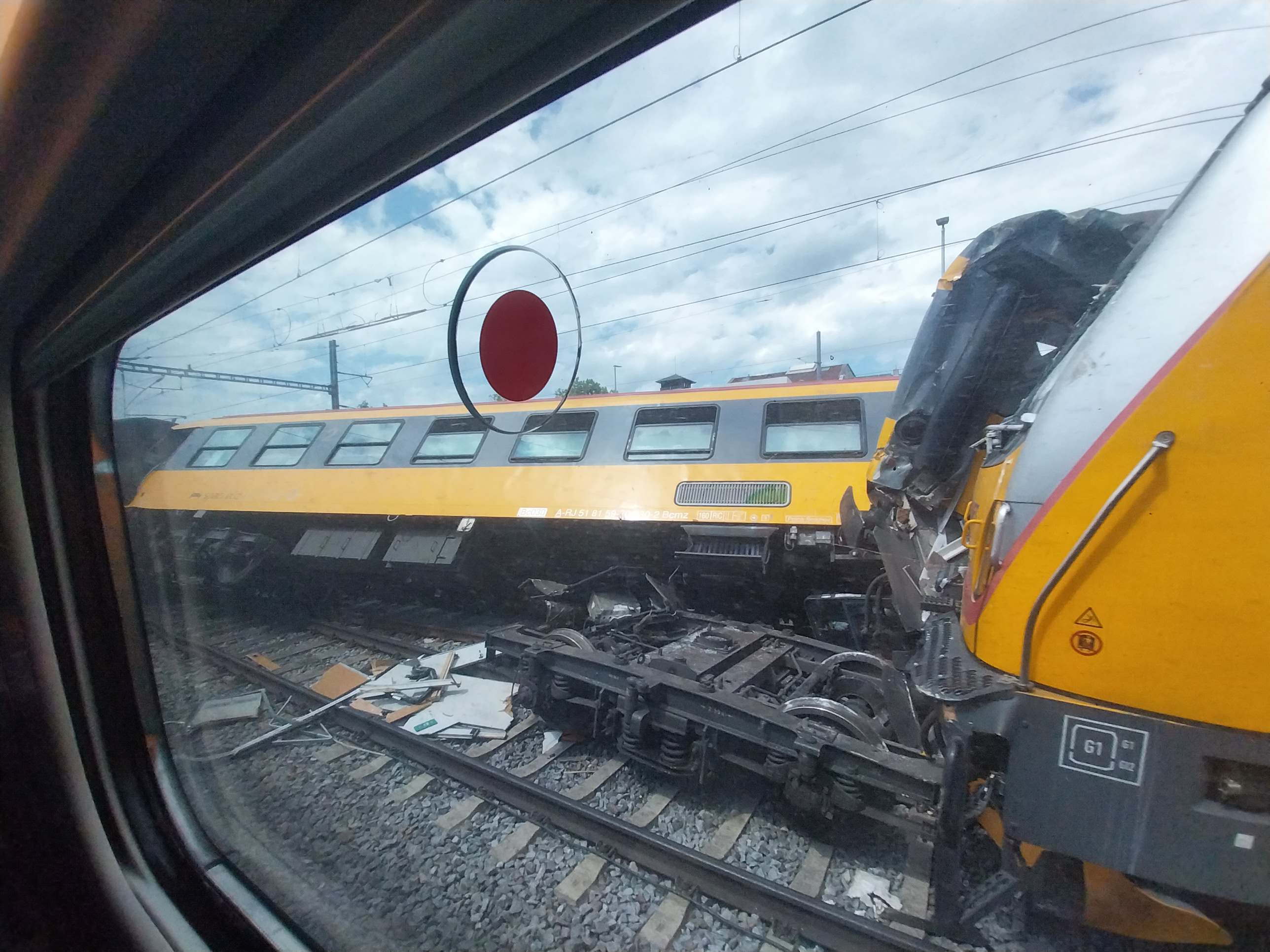
- Pardubice train collision
  5 June – Czech Republic – Pardubice train collision: ČD Cargo freight express train 41340 collided head-on with RegioJet passenger express train 1021 at Pardubice main railway station, at least four people were killed and 23 were injured.
- 6 June – Russia – In Kemerovo, two trams collided on a bridge, killing one person and injuring 102 others.
- 17 June – India – 2024 West Bengal train collision: In West Bengal, a cargo train collided with the Kanchenjunga Express near New Jalpaiguri station in Darjeeling District, killing at least 15 people and injuring 60 others.
- 20 June – Chile – In San Bernardo, a freight train collided with another train conducting a test run, killing two people and injuring nine others.
- 26 June – Russia – In the Komi Republic, a passenger train detailed near Inta, killing three people and injuring 40 others.
- 27 June – Slovakia – Near Nové Zámky, a EuroCity train collided with a bus; seven people died.
- 15 July – Russia – In Belgorod Oblast, two trains collided head-on in Stary Oskol, killing one person.
- 18 July – India – Twelve cars of the Dibrugarh–Chandigarh Express train derailed in Gonda, Uttar Pradesh, resulting in at least two dead and 25 injured.
- 29 July – Russia – In Volgograd Oblast, a train derailed after hitting a truck at a level crossing, injuring 156 people.
- 30 July – India – In Jharkhand, a train derailed near Barabamboo, killing two people and injuring 20 others.
- 13 August
  - South Africa – In Pretoria, 2 passenger trains collided near Rossyln station. 100 people were injured.
  - Democratic Republic of Congo – In Tanganyika Province, a train derailed killing 50 and injuring dozens.
- 15 August – United States – In Sherman, Wisconsin, a freight train derailed after striking a truck. One person was killed and one person was injured.
- 14 September – Egypt – At least three people were killed and 49 injured in a train collision in Zagazig, Sharqia Governorate.
- 18 September – South Africa – In Cape Town, a passenger train derailed due to a fault on the tracks. 25 people were injured.
- 24 September – Germany – In Düsseldorf, a commuter train collided with a parked train at an adjacent track. Fourteen people were injured.
- 1 October – United States – An MBTA Green Line train split a switch in Somerville, Massachusetts derailing and injuring seven.
- 11 October – India – 2024 Tamil Nadu train collision: In Chennai, a Mysuru Dharbhanga train collided with a freight train on a loop line, causing a fire. Nineteen people were injured.
- 13 October – Egypt – In Minya Governorate, a locomotive rear-ended a passenger train, killing one person and injuring 21 others.
- 14 October – United States – An NJ Transit train struck a tree that had fallen onto the tracks in Mansfield Township, New Jersey, killing the driver and injuring 23 others.
- 18 October
  - Sri Lanka – In Minneriya, a train carrying fuel collided with a herd of elephants, killing two of the animals, derailing the train and causing a major leakage.
  - United Kingdom – A Manchester Metrolink tram collided head-on with a bus in the city centre resulting in four injuries.
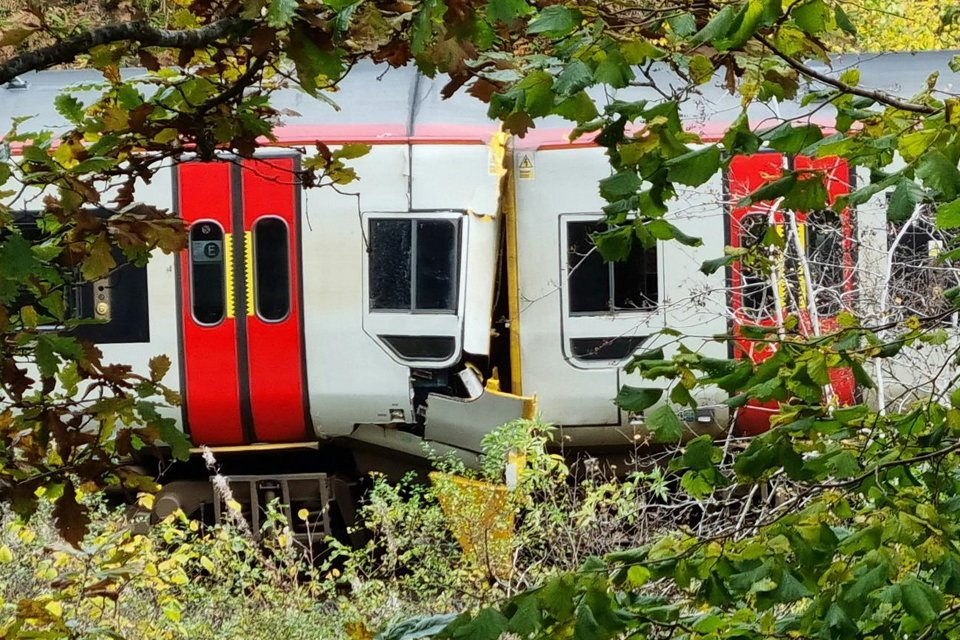
- 2024 Talerddig train collision
  21 October – United Kingdom – 2024 Talerddig train collision – Two Transport for Wales trains collided head-on near Llanbrynmair. One person died, four people suffered serious injuries and 11 suffered minor injuries.
- 24 October – Norway – 2024 Finneidfjord train derailment – A train from Trondheim to Bodø derailed on the Nordland Line in Finneidfjord, between Bjerka and Mo i Rana after being hit by a rockfall, killing one person and injuring four others.
- 29 October – Norway – In Oslo, a runaway tram train with 20 people on board, derailed and struck a store. 4 people were injured.
- 3 November – South Africa – In Cape Town, a train collided with stationary cargo carriages parked on the tracks. 16 people were injured.
- 19 November – United States – An Amtrak Cascades train traveling from Vancouver to Seattle struck a tree that had fallen due to heavy wind gusts near Stanwood, Washington. The train was heavily damaged, but the engineer received minor injuries.
- 18 December
  - Russia – Murmansk train collision – In Murmansk, a passenger train collided with a freight train, killing two people and injuring 31 others.
  - United States – A Union Pacific train struck a tractor trailer carrying an oversized load and derailed in Pecos, Texas, killing both crew members on the train and injuring three others. Some cars of the derailed train also crashed into the nearby Chamber of Commerce building.
- 22 December – China – A train of the Shanghai Metro Line 11 was hit by a collapsed tower crane.
- 28 December – United States – At Delray Beach, Florida, when a level crossing remained closed after a freight train passed, the driver of a ladder truck carelessly went around the barriers. A Brightline train on the other track crashed into the truck, demolishing it. The three firefighters aboard were hospitalized and 12 passengers on the train had minor injuries.

== 2025 ==
- 4 January – United States – In Corvallis, Oregon, a bridge collapsed into the Marys River as a freight train crossed over it. One car carrying urea fertilizer fell into the river while two others were left dangling over the edge. There were no injuries.
- 11 January – France – In Strasbourg, two trams collided, injuring 68 people.
- 22 January – India – In Jalgaon, Maharashtra, the Pushpak Express train collided with a group of people who had disembarked from another train following a fire alarm and were crossing the tracks. Thirteen people were killed and 15 others were injured.
- 31 January – Pakistan – The Shalimar Express, a train operated by Pakistan Railways, derailed near Lahore. Several people were injured.
- 5 February – India – In Fatehpur, Uttar Pradesh, two freight trains collided near Rusalabad Train Station, injuring two people.
- 7 February – United States – In Ridley Park, Pennsylvania, a SEPTA Regional Rail train carrying 350 people caught fire. There were no injuries.
- 9 February – United States – In Somerville, Massachusetts, two MBTA Green Line trains collided at East Somerville station, injuring 5.
- 11 February – Germany – In Hamburg, an Intercity Express train collided with a truck. No one on the truck was hurt, but one person was killed and 25 people were injured on the train.
- 19 February – Romania – In Olt County, two freight trains collided, killing a conductor.
- 20 February – Sri Lanka – In Habarana, an express train collided with a herd of elephants near a wildlife reserve and derailed, killing six of the animals.
- 28 February – Czech Republic – In Hustopeče nad Bečvou, a freight train carrying benzene derailed, causing a massive fire. There were no injuries.
- 10 March – United States – In Somerset Township, Pennsylvania, a CSX train collided with a coal truck. Three people were injured, and a tank carrying 2,500 U.S. gallons (9,500 L) ruptured and leaked into a creek.
- 11 March – Germany – In Ubstadt-Weiher, a truck carrying heating oil collided with a tram, causing both vehicles to catch fire and leaving three tram passengers dead.
- 30 March – India – In Cuttack, 11 cars of a Bengaluru-Kamakhya train derailed near Nirgundi Train Station, killing one person and injuring eight others.
- 1 April – India – In Jharkhand, two NTPC trains collided near Sahebganj, killing two people and injuring four others.
- 20 April – Zimbabwe – In Gwanda, a luxury passenger train and a freight train collided while on tour. 13 people were injured.
- 11 May – United States – In Norristown, Pennsylvania, a Norristown High Speed Train collided with a buffer at the end of the tracks. Eight people were injured.
- 1 June – France – In Illkirch-Graffenstaden near Strasbourg, a tram driver probably fell asleep and the tram passed the end of the track, derailed, and hit a pylon. Six people were lightly injured.
- 9 June
  - India – In Mumbai, multiple people fell off a Mumbai bound local train at Mumbra Train Station. Five people were killed and nine were injured. The cause of the accident was a sudden jerk on a sharp curve that caused them to bump into each other and fall off the train.
  - United States – Near Walcott, Wyoming, two Union Pacific trains derailed, releasing propane and prompting a hazmat situation. No injuries were reported.
- 20 June – United States – Southeast of Enderlin, North Dakota, an EF5 tornado derailed 33 train cars on a stopped freight train in the CPKC's Elbow Lake Subdivision.
- 21 June – India – In Bihar, an Avadh Express train collided with a maintenance trolley near Semapur Train Station. One person was killed and four were injured.
- 29 June – United States – Near Hartford, Wisconsin, a Wisconsin and Southern freight train derailed, injuring three crew members and causing 19 cars and three diesel locomotives to overturn. Thousands of gallons of diesel fuel were spilled. A derailed tank car containing nitrous oxide cracked, but did not leak.
- 5 July – United States – In Glendora, Mississippi, 13 cars of a Canadian National freight train derailed, including one car that spilled benzene, forcing an evacuation of the area. There were no injuries.
- 27 July – Germany – Riedlingen derailment: In Riedlingen, a passenger train derailed, killing three people and injuring 50 others. The disaster was blamed on a landslide along the tracks caused by leaking sewage from a shaft.
- 1 August – Pakistan – In Kala Shah Kaku, an Islamabad Express train derailed resulting in several cars to overturn. 48 people were injured.
- 9 August – Iran – In Tabas, a passenger train derailed after hitting an excavator, injuring 30 people.
- 15 August – Denmark – In Tinglev, a passenger train derailed after colliding with slurry tanker at a level crossing, killing one person and injuring 27 others.
- 19 August – South Korea – In Cheongdo, a passenger train hit a group of rail workers conducting inspection works on a slope near the tracks following heavy rains, killing two and injuring four.
- 26 August – Nigeria – In Abuja, a passenger train derailed while travelling on the Abuja-Kaduna route, killing one person and injuring six.
- 30 August – Egypt – A passenger train traveling from Matrouh Governorate to Cairo derailed in the west of the country, killing three people and injuring 94 others.
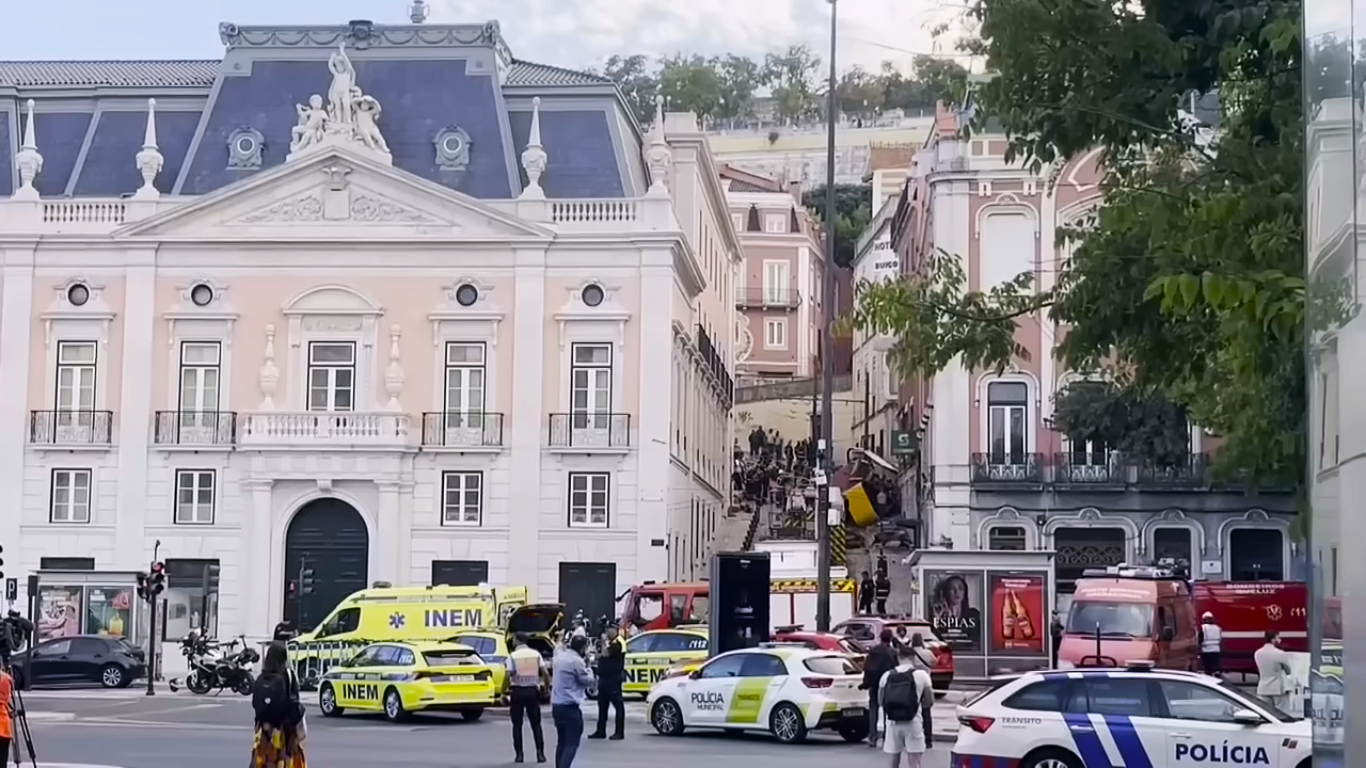
- Photo taken from the Restauradores after the Ascensor da Glória derailment
  3 September – Portugal – Ascensor da Glória derailment: A tram car of the Ascensor da Glória funicular derailed and crashed into a building near Avenida da Liberdade in Lisbon, killing 16 people and injuring 21 others.
- 8 September – Mexico – In Atlacomulco, a freight train collided with a double-decker bus carrying tourists, killing 10 people and injuring 61.
- 10 September – Lithuania – Several cars of a freight train carrying liquefied petroleum gas caught fire and exploded near Vilnius, injuring one person.
- 14 September – Russia – A locomotive derailed near Semrino station in Gatchinsky District, Leningrad Oblast, killing the driver.
- 26 September – Russia – A freight train carrying gasoline derailed after colliding with a truck at a crossing in Smolensk Oblast, setting six cars on fire, killing the truck driver and injuring the train driver and his assistant.
- 2 October – United States – Near Guadalupe, California, an Amtrak Coast Starlight train struck a tank truck at an uncontrolled grade crossing. The truck driver was killed, three passengers aboard the train were injured, and about 3,500 U.S. gallons (13,000 L) of the truck's load of diesel fuel was spilled.
- 9 October – United States – In Los Angeles, California, eight people were injured when a Metrolink train collided with a parked train at Los Angeles Union Station.
- 13 October – Slovakia – Two trains collided near Rožňava, injuring 66 people, including 16 who suffered "moderate or serious injuries."
- 20 October – Ethiopia – 2025 Shinile train collision: Fifteen people were killed and dozens injured when a train that was returning from Dewele collided with a stationary train near Dire Dawa.
- 31 October
  - Netherlands – In Meteren, a passenger train collided with a truck at a railroad crossing, injuring five people on the train.
  - Russia – A tram derailed and collided with two minibuses on a bridge in Tula, killing four people and injuring more than 20 others.
- 1 November – Canada – Near Kamloops, British Columbia, a locomotive and 17 cars of a CPKC freight train derailed, spilling gypsum and approximately 70,536 liters (18,634 U.S. gal) of aviation fuel into Kamloops Lake. There were no injuries.
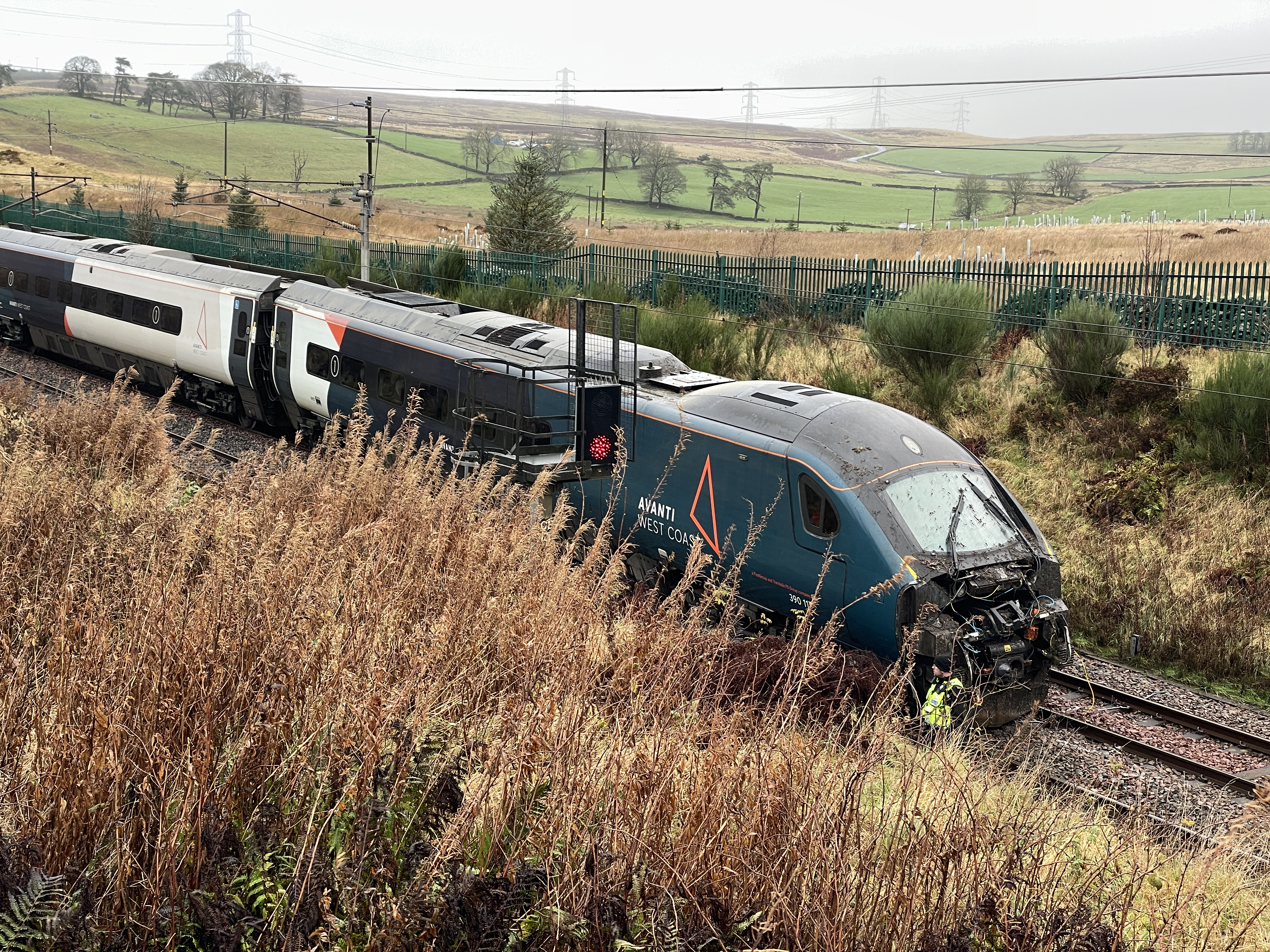
- 2025 Shap derailment
  3 November – United Kingdom – 2025 Shap derailment: An Avanti West Coast train derailed in Cumbria after hitting a landslide. Four people were injured.
- 4 November – India – 2025 Chhattisgarh train collision: A passenger train collided with a cargo train near Bilaspur, Chhattisgarh, killing eight people and injuring 12 others.
- 9 November – Slovakia – An express train rear-ended a passenger train near Pezinok, injuring 79 people.
- 11 November – Argentina – A train derailed along the Domingo Faustino Sarmiento Railway in Liniers, Buenos Aires, injuring 20 people.
- 20 November – Czech Republic – 2025 Dívčice train collision: An express train rear-ended a passenger train near České Budějovice, injuring 57 people.
- 27 November – China – Kunming train crash: A train carrying out testing for seismic equipment hit a group of railway maintenance workers in Luoyangzhen station in Kunming, killing 11 people and injuring two others.
- 28 November – India – In Jharkhand, two cars of a Rampurhat-Jasidih EMU local passenger train derailed near Dumka Train Station, damaging an electric pole. Four people were injured.
- 6 December – Thailand – In Kanchanaburi, a passenger train collided with a stationary train, injuring 33 people.
- 19 December – United States – In Montclair, New Jersey, two NJ Transit trains collided at Bay Street station, injuring 17 people.
- 20 December – India – The Rajdhani Express train struck a herd of Asian elephants in a forested area of Assam, resulting in the deaths of seven of the animals and the derailing of five coaches and the engine.
- 28 December – Mexico – 2025 Oaxaca train derailment: A Tren Interoceánico derailed near Nizandá, Oaxaca, killing 14 people and injuring more than 100.
- 30 December – Peru – 2025 Ollantaytambo District train collision: More than 40 people were injured and one person died after two passenger trains collided head-on traveling to Machu Picchu.

== 2026 ==
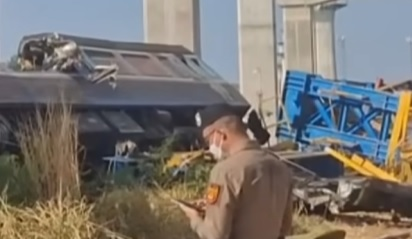
- Sikhio train disaster
  14 January – Thailand – Sikhio train disaster: In Sikhio, Nakhon Ratchasima province, a launching gantry crane used for the construction of the Bangkok–Nong Khai high-speed railway collapsed onto a passenger train, killing 30 people and injuring 69 others.
- 17 January – Colombia – In Duitama, two freight wagons detached and rolled into city streets, striking vehicles; a woman inside a car was killed and others were injured.
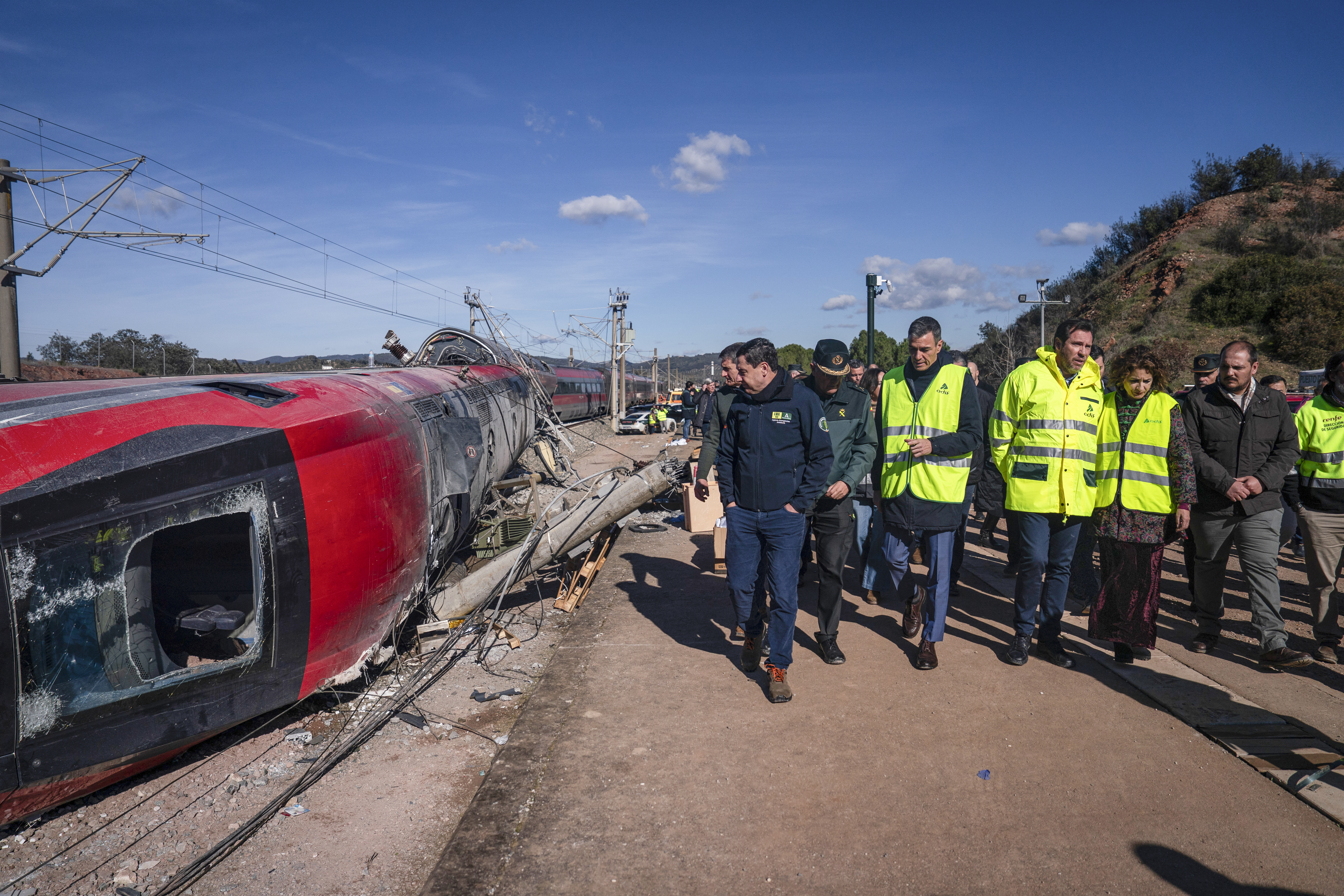
- 2026 Adamuz rail disaster
  18 January – Spain – 2026 Adamuz rail disaster: Two high-speed trains collided after one derailed, thus derailing the other, near Adamuz, killing 46.
- 20 January – Spain – 2026 Gelida train derailment: a Rodalies train collided with a retaining wall that had fallen on the track due to a landslide, killing a driver and injuring at least 37 passengers.
- 22 January – Spain – Near Cartagena, a commuter train struck a crane. At least four people were injured.
- 25 January – United Kingdom – A road-rail maintenance vehicle caught fire in the Standedge Tunnel. The fire was extinguished but the tunnel was closed to rail traffic for several days.
- 12 February – Bosnia and Herzegovina – 2026 Sarajevo tram derailment: a tram derailed in Sarajevo, killing one person and injuring four.
- 16 February – Switzerland – A train was derailed by an avalanche near Goppenstein, injuring five people.
- 22 February – United States – Near Memphis, Tennessee, a Canadian National train collided with an Amtrak train at low speed, injuring three people.
- 26 February – United States – In Los Angeles, California, an LA Metro train collided with a car in the Central-Almeada area, injuring nine people.
- 27 February – Italy – A tram in Milan derailed, killing at least two people and injuring as many as 40.
- 16 March – Nigeria – In Abuja, a passenger train on the Abuja-Kaduna route derailed, injuring 26.
- 22 March – Bangladesh – In Chittagong, a Dhaka-bound train collided with a bus at the Paduar Bazar Railroad Crossing, killing 12 and injuring 10.
- 3 April – Russia – A passenger train derailed near Bryandino, Ulyanovsk Oblast, injuring 35.
- 7 April – France – A TGV POS train hit a military truck at a crossing between Béthune and Lens, killing the train driver and injuring 13 people.
- 16 April – Slovakia – A passenger train travelling from Dunajská Streda to Komárno collided with a truck and derailed, killing one and injuring 21.
- 23 April
  - United States – In Washington, D.C., a stopped Silver Line Washington Metro train was struck by a work train at Metro Center station, injuring 11.
  - Denmark – 2026 North Zealand train collision: Two passenger trains collided head-on between Hillerød and Kagerup, injuring 18, including five critically.
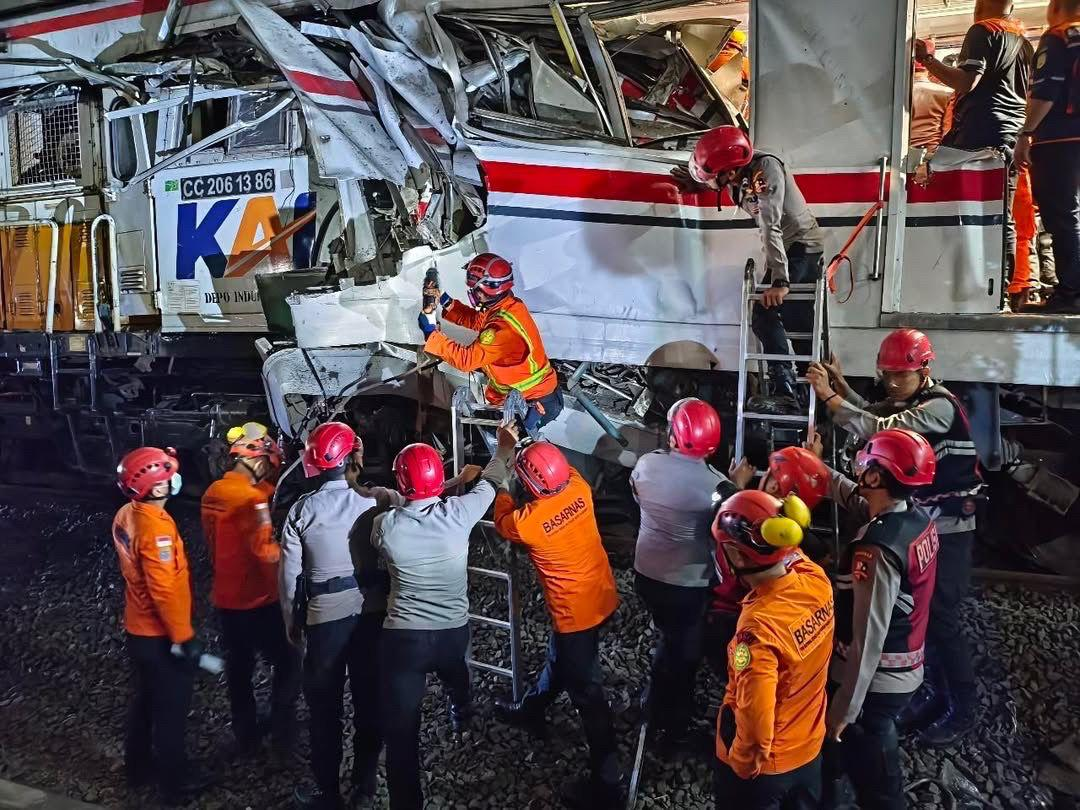
- 2026 Bekasi train collision
  27 April – Indonesia – 2026 Bekasi train crash: In Bekasi, West Java, a KRL Commuterline train was rear-ended by an Argo Bromo Anggrek train at Bekasi Timur Station, killing 16 and injuring 90.
- 6 May – United States – Near Rifle, Colorado, a Canyon Spirit train collided with a tank truck, causing two locomotives and six passenger cars to derail. The truck driver was injured and the truck's load of 6,000 U.S. gallons (23,000 L) of road oil was spilled.
- 14 May – United States – In Chesapeake, Virginia, a Norfolk Southern freight train collided with a septic truck. A man was hospitalized with life-threatening injuries, and a "minor fuel-related hazmat situation" occurred.
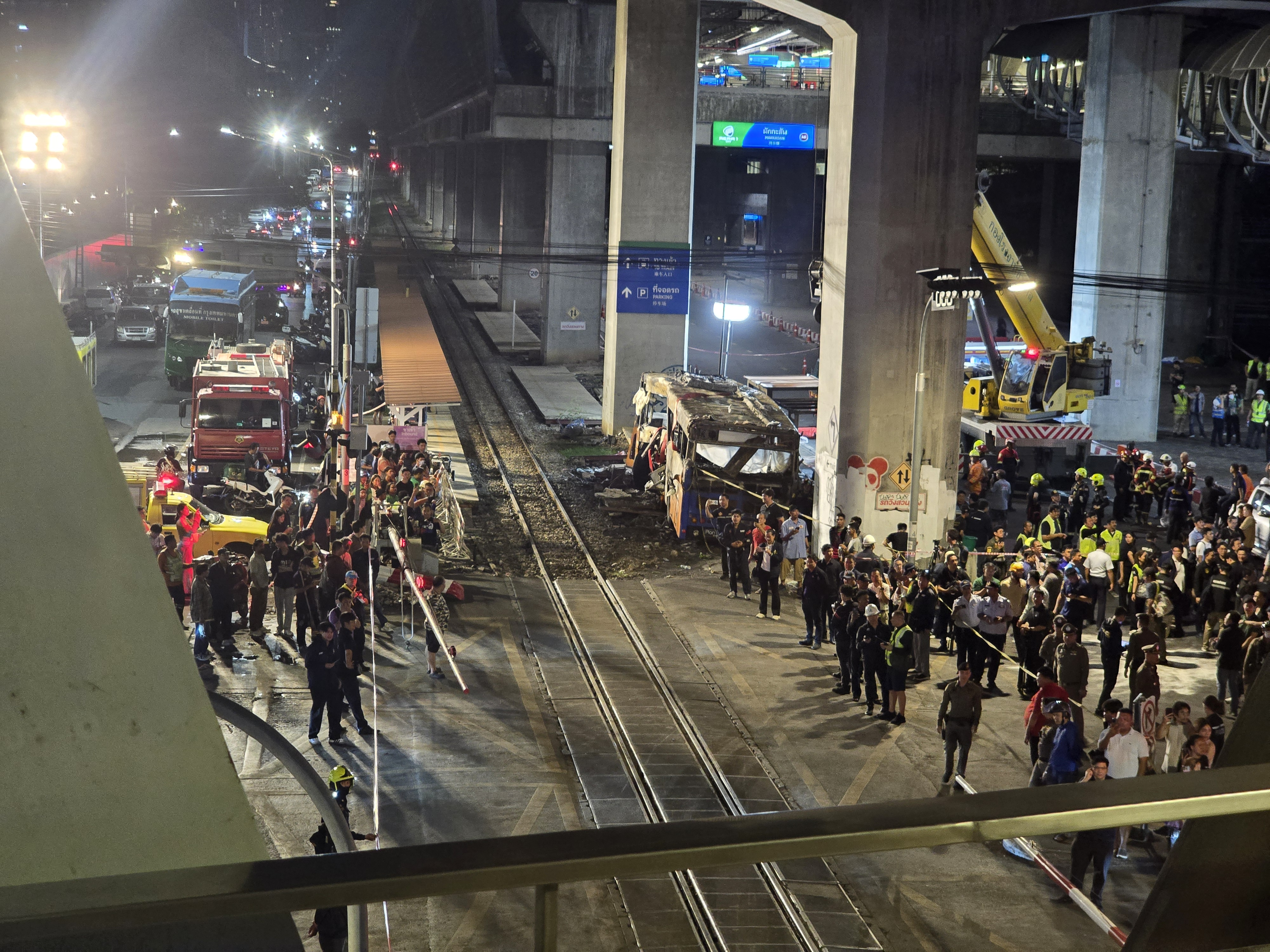
- 2026 Bangkok train collision
  16 May – Thailand – 2026 Bangkok train collision: At a level crossing near Makkasan station in Ratchathewi district, Bangkok, a freight train collided with several vehicles, including a city bus, killing eight and injuring 32.
- 26 May – Belgium – Buggenhout train collision: A passenger train and a minibus collided on a level crossing at Buggenhout, killing four people and severely injuring five on the minibus. No injuries were reported on the train
- 3 June – United States – Near Victor, Iowa, an Iowa Interstate Railroad train struck a semi-trailer truck at a grade crossing, causing both locomotives and at least 17 freight cars to derail. The truck's passenger was killed while the driver and both of the train's crew members were injured.
- 6 June – New Zealand – A passenger train collided with a concrete buffer just south of Khandallah station in Wellington, injuring eight.
- 8 June – Nigeria – A passenger train derailed on the Itakpe-Warri route in Delta State, killing four and injuring 24.
- 16 June – Zimbabwe – In Triangle, a freight train collided with a bus whose driver failed to check for oncoming trains before crossing the tracks. The collision killed nine people and injured 25.
- 19 June
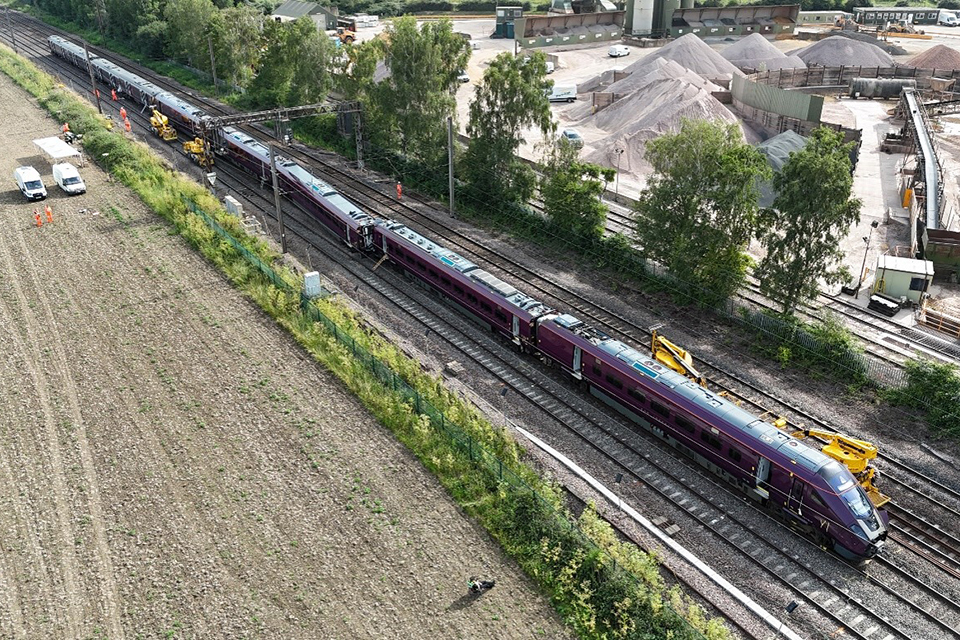
  - 2026 Bedford train collision
    United Kingdom – 2026 Bedford train collision: Two passenger trains collided near Elstow, just south of Bedford, after one of the services stopped moving. One person was killed.
  - Germany – Two freight trains collided in Munich, killing one person.
- 25 June
  - Poland – 2026 Białośliwie train collision: Two passenger trains collided in Białośliwie, Piła County, injuring 11.
  - United Kingdom – A train collided with a vehicle at a level crossing in Hoghton. The car driver was killed and an eight-year old child seriously injured, although there were no injuries on board the train. It was reported that the warning system was not activated, and that the train had a green signal when the accident occurred.
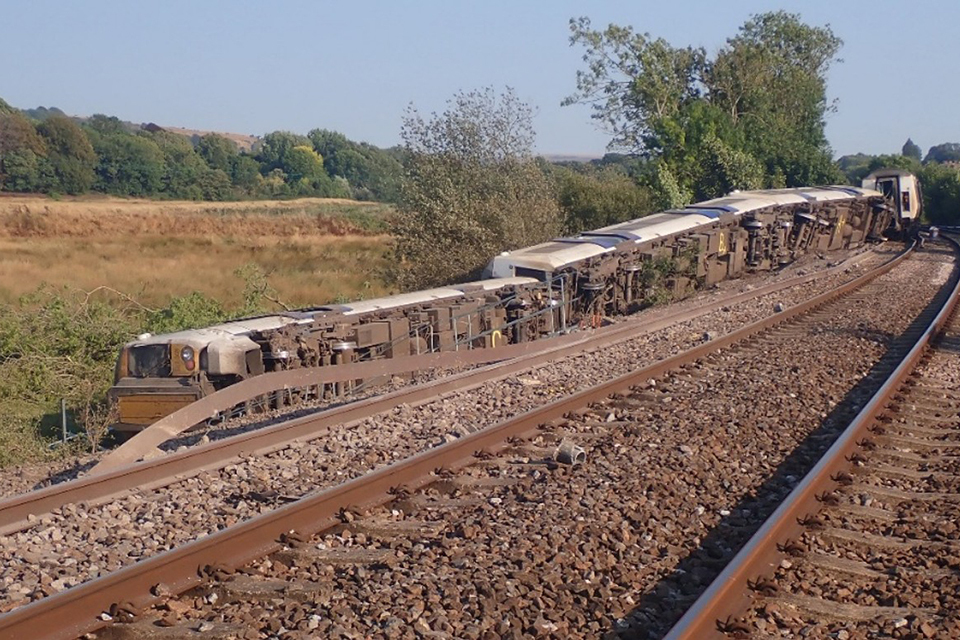
- Lewes derailment
  13 August – United Kingdom – Lewes derailment: A train derailed near Lewes, injuring 30 people, including two seriously.
- 20 August – Japan – Shin-Kanuma rail accident: A limited express train hit a group of railway workers spraying herbicide along the Tōbu Nikkō Line in Shin-Kanuma Station in Kanuma, Tochigi, killing four.
- 4 September – Ireland – An Irish Rail passenger train collided with a car on a user-operated level crossing at Kiltybo, near Ballyhaunis, County Mayo. A child who was a passenger in the car was killed, while the car driver was taken to hospital with non-life-threatening injuries.
- 9 September – Poland – Sokolniki Suche train collision: A PKP Intercity train derailed at a level crossing in Sokolniki Suche, after a lorry collided into the side of its first carriage, injuring 19 people and killing two.
- 11 September – France – Cléon derailment: A passenger train derailed at Cléon, injuring 44. Sabotage is suspected to be the cause.
- 12 October – Spain – An AVE passenger train travelling from Madrid to Barcelona caught fire at Ricla, forcing the evacuation of all 283 passengers on board.
- 13 October – Pakistan – A passenger train derailed in Sher Shah, Multan, killing five people and injuring 35.
- 15 October – France – A bus collided with a stationary freight train at the loading platform of the Channel Tunnel in Coquelles, injuring 19 people.
- Diagram of the 2026 Toledo train collision
  28 October – Spain – 2026 Toledo train collision: An AVE passenger train crashed into a stopped Iryo passenger train in Los Yébenes killing at least 69 people and injuring at least 179.
- 8 November – Egypt – 2026 El Ayyat train collision: A train travelling between Giza and Faiyum rear-ended a stationary train that was travelling from Cairo to Aswan, killing seven people and injuring 112 others.
- 16 November – Poland – The brake pads of the second last carriage of PKP Intercity "Uszatek" train caught fire at Justynów railway station shortly after 8:40 AM. No one was injured.
- 17 November – Czech Republic – Two trains collided head-on on a bridge in Prague, injuring 15 people.
