= Murmansk train collision =

2024 railway incident in Russia

Details
- Date: 18 December 2024
- Location: Zelenoborsky
- Coordinates: 66.823282°N 32.350879°E
- Country: Russia
- Line: Saint Petersburg - Murmansk
- Operator: Russian Railways
- Incident type: Side collision

Statistics
- Trains: 2
- Passengers: 337
- Deaths: 2
- Injured: 31

The Murmansk train collision occurred on 18 December 2024, when a passenger train and a freight train collided in Zelenoborsky, Murmansk Oblast, Russia. Two people were killed and 31 people were injured.

Two trains were involved in a collision at Knyazhaya Station when one train ran into the side of another. Two passengers were killed and 31 others were injured. Passenger train #11 was travelling from Murmansk to Saint Petersburg with 337 passengers. Freight train #2013 was travelling from Titan, Murmansk Oblast to the south.

There was a derailment of four tail cars of the passenger train and 14 loaded cars from the tail of the freight train.

== See also ==
- List of rail accidents (2020–present)
