= 2022 Lualaba train accident =

2022 train derailment in the Democratic Republic of the Congo

Details
- Date: 11 March 2022; 11:50pm
- Location: Buyofwe village, Lualaba Province
- Country: Democratic Republic of the Congo
- Owner: Société nationale des chemins de fer du Congo
- Incident type: Derailment

Statistics
- Trains: 1
- Deaths: 75
- Injured: 125

A train derailment took place in the village of Buyofwe, Lualaba Province, Democratic Republic of the Congo, on 11 March 2022. It killed 75 people and injured 125 others.

== Derailment ==
On 11 March 2022, a freight train operated by the Société nationale des chemins de fer du Congo left the town of Kitenta heading towards the village of Buyofwe. The train was carrying several hundred stowaways and had 10-15 cars. At 11:50 p.m. local time, while traveling uphill near the village of Buyofwe, the train derailed. The derailment sent seven of the cars on the train tumbling down into a ravine, killing 75 people and injuring another 125.
