= La Hiniesta =

Coordinates: 41°33′N 5°48′W

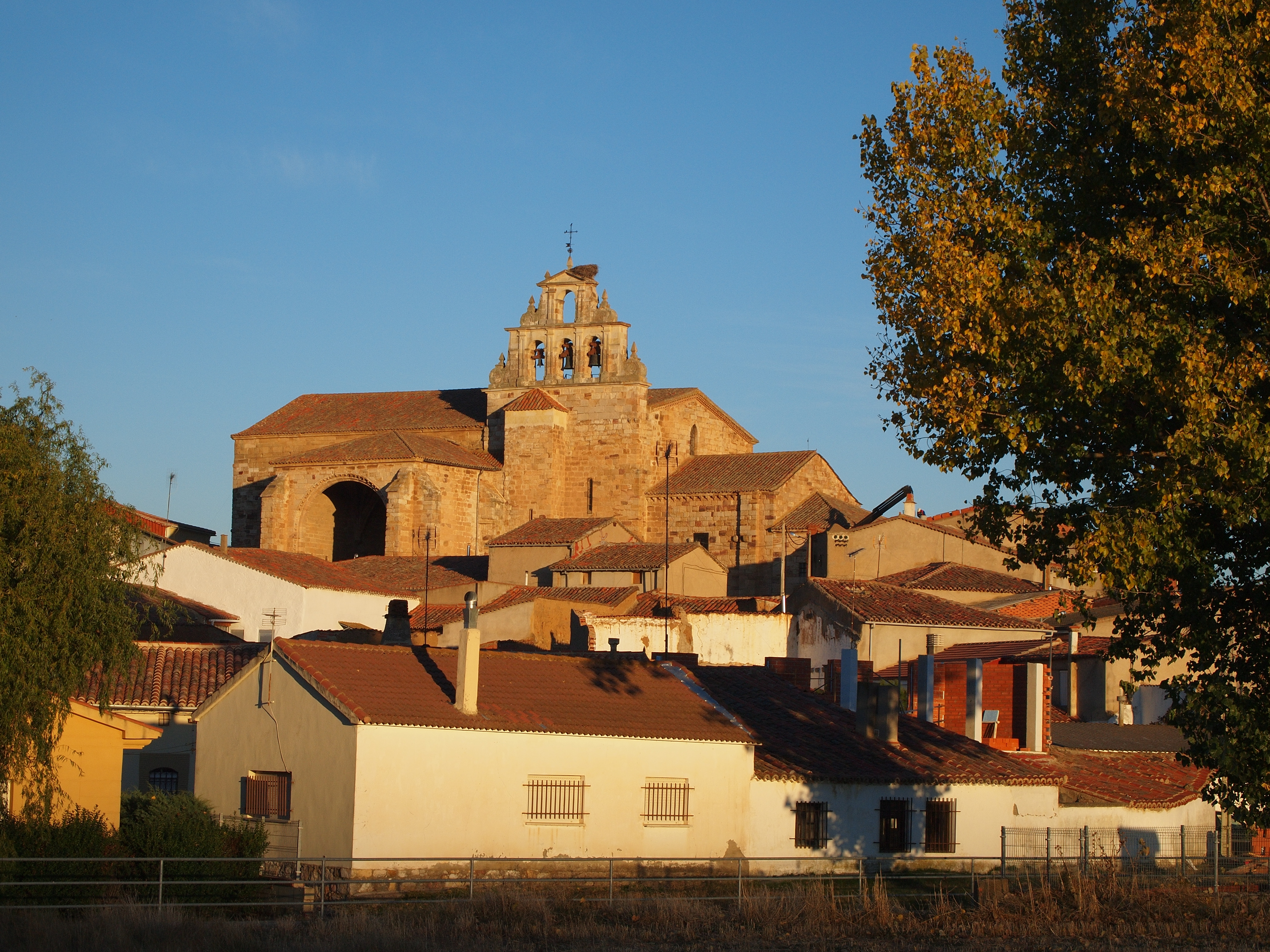
- Interactive map of La Hiniesta
- Country: Spain
- Autonomous community: Castile and León
- Province: Zamora
- Municipality: La Hiniesta

Area
  - Total: 33 km^{2} (13 sq mi)

Population (2025-01-01)
  - Total: 293
  - Density: 8.9/km^{2} (23/sq mi)
- Time zone: UTC+1 (CET)
  - Summer (DST): UTC+2 (CEST)

La Hiniesta, 7 km from the capital, Zamora, of (Reino de León) currently belongs to the province of the same name in the Comunidad Autónoma de Castilla-León in Spain. Uts population was 364 inhabitants (Census 2004 by INE). Its major attraction is the Iglesia de Santa María, a church that King Sancho IV of Leon ordered built in the honor of the Virgin, who appeared to him in una cacería entre unas hiniestas o retamas, from whence it gets its more frequently-used name, Virgen de la Hiniesta. Among its more famous products are the sheep milk cheese, of exquisite purity, of both natural and artisanal manufacture.
