= List of Czech rail accidents =

This list contains those train wrecks which happened in the Czech Republic, including former territories which are now within the country.

== List ==
Accident	Date	Killed	Injured	Description
Vranovice rail accident	7 July 1839	0	3-8	Collision
Jason locomotive explosion	27 July 1848	4	2	Explosion
Cerhovice train accident	November 10 1868	22	60	Collision
Úvaly train accident	3 February 1869	1	10	Derailment
Glaucos locomotive explosion	23 March 1873			Boiler explosion
Blovice train accident	5 August 1890	5	32	Derailment
Popovice train accident	14 October 1909	2	5	Derailment
Uhersko train accident	25 December, 1909	12	18	Collision
Pitín train accident	8 October 1921	1	12	Collision
Čelákovice train accident	6 December 1919	4	104	Head-on collision
Znosim train accident	2 July 1932	10	15	Collision
Podivín train accident	21 December 1950	34	56	Collision with bus
Suchdol nad Odrou train accident	26 August 1952	12	108	Derailment
Šakvice train collision	24 December 1953	103	83	Collision
Stéblová train disaster	14 November 1960	118	110	Head-on collision
Hloubětín train accident	21 September 1965	14	70	Collision
Běchovice train accident	15 October 1965	2	4	Collision
Deštnice train accident	2 May 1966	10	37	Collision
Hradec nad Svitavou train accident	13 September 1967	4	19	Derailment
Řikonín train accident	11 December 1970	31	18	Fall from viaduct
Prague train accident	31 March 1988	2	15	Collision
Nové Kopisty train accident	10 November 1989	6	50+	Collision
Spálov train accident	25 August 1990	14	32	Collision
Třebechovice pod Orebem train accident	3 October 1990	6	16	Collision
Krouna train accident	24 June 1995	19	4	Head-on collision between railcar and lost freight waggon
Moravany train accident	19 May 2008	1	4	Derailment
Studénka train wreck	8 August 2008	8	64	Crash into a collapsed bridge
Ústí nad Labem derailment	28 June 2010	1	11	Derailment
Studénka train crash	22 July 2015	3	17	Collision with truck
Milavče train crash	4 August 2021	3	42	Head-on collision
Pardubice train collision	5 June 2024	4	30	Head-on collision
Hustopeče nad Bečvou train accident	28 February 2025	0	0	Train transporting benzene started burning
2025 Dívčice train collision	20 November 2025	0	42	Head-on collision
2026 Chynov train collision	23 July 2026	0	4	Collision with van at crossing
