= List of disasters in the Czech Republic by death toll =

The list of disasters in the Czech Republic by death toll includes major disasters and accidents – excluding warfare and other intentional acts – that took place in the territory of the Czech Republic and resulted in 10 or more fatalities:

Disaster	Type	Location	Deaths	Date	References
Great Famine of 1315–1317	Famine	Czech lands	Tens thousands or more	1315–1317	
Czech Famine	Famine	Czech lands	250,000–500,000	1770–1772	
Spanish flu	Pandemic	Czechoslovakia	44,000–82,648	1918–1920	
COVID-19 pandemic in the Czech Republic	Pandemic	Czech Republic	42,806	2020–2023	
Marie mine disaster	Mine disaster	Příbram	319	31 May 1892	
Karviná mine disaster	Mine disaster	Karviná	235	14 June 1894	
Bolevec Disaster	Explosion	Třemošná	Over 200	25 May 1917	
Nelson III Mine Disaster	Mine disaster	Teplice	144	3 January 1934	
Stéblová train disaster	Trainwreck	Stéblová	118	14 November 1960	
Dukla mine disaster	Mine disaster	Dolní Suchá	108	7 July 1961	
Šakvice train collision	Trainwreck	Šakvice	103	24 December 1953	
Swine flu pandemic	Pandemic	Czech Republic	102	2009	
Inex-Adria Aviopromet Flight 450	Aircrash	Suchdol, Prague	79	30 October 1975	Including four people who died in Hospital.
Aeroflot Flight 141	Aircrash	0.46 km from Prague Ruzyně Airport	66	19 February 1973	
Desná Dam	Dam failure	Jizera Mountains	65	18 September 1916	
1997 Central European flood	Flood	Oder and Morava river basins	50	July 1997	
2012 Czech Republic methanol poisonings	Poisonings	Czech Republic	48	September 2012	
Tachov Explosion	Explosion	Tachov	47	13 December 1973	
Michálka mine disaster	Mine disaster	Slezská Ostrava	36	4 October 1950	
JAT Flight 367	Aircrash	Srbská Kamenice	27	26 January 1972	
Doubrava mine disaster	Mine disaster	Doubrava	25	7 May 1985	
MESIT Factory Collapse	Building collapse	Uherské Hradiště	18	23 November 1984	
2002 European floods	Flood	Czech Republic	17	August 2002	
2013 European floods	Flood	Czech Republic	16	May–June 2013	
2009 European floods	Flood	Czech Republic	15	June 2009	
ČSM Mine Explosion	Mine disaster	Karviná District	13	20 December 2018	

== Significant incidents resulting in fewer than 10 deaths ==
Disaster	Type	Location	Deaths	Date	References
2008 Studénka train crash	Trainwreck	Studénka	8	8 August 2008	
2020 fire of disabled people's home in Vejprty	Fire	Vejprty	8	19 January 2020	
Most restaurant explosion	Explosion	Most	7	11 January 2025	
2021 South Moravia tornado	Tornado	South Moravian Region	6	24 June 2021	
2024 Central European floods	Flood	Czech Republic	5	September 2024	
2015 Studénka train crash	Trainwreck	Studénka	3	22 July 2015	
Milavče train crash	Trainwreck	Milavče	3	4 August 2021	
Bohemian Switzerland Fire	Fire	Bohemian Switzerland	0	23 July 2022 and 12 August 2022	

== See also ==
- List of disasters in Antarctica by death toll
- List of disasters in Australia by death toll
- List of disasters in Canada by death toll
- List of disasters in Croatia by death toll
- List of disasters in Great Britain and Ireland by death toll
- List of disasters in New Zealand by death toll
- List of disasters in Poland by death toll
- List of disasters in the United States by death toll
