= Milavče culture =

Bronze age culture in Europe

The Milavce culture was a Bronze Age culture, part of the Urnfield culture. Its type site is Milavče in the Czech Republic.
