= 2025 Hustopeče nad Bečvou train crash =

Event in the Czech Republic

The 2025 Hustopeče nad Bečvou train crash was a railway accident that occurred on 28 February 2025 near the station in Hustopeče nad Bečvou, Czech Republic. A freight train carrying 1,020 tonnes of benzene, derailed around noon local time, resulting in a major chemical fire. It is considered one of the worst events of this kind in modern time of the Czech Republic.

== Incident ==
On 28 February 2025, around noon local time, a 17 tanker freight train (Pn 52690) carrying 1,020 tonnes benzene from the DEZA plant in Valašské Meziříčí to the Ostrava chemical plant BorsodChem MCHZ was derailed. 15 of the train's 17 tankers ignited and released thick black smoke that was visible from a considerable distance. Each affected tanker contained approximately 60 metric tonnes of benzene, a highly flammable and toxic substance used in chemical manufacturing. This is considered one of the worst events of this kind in modern time in the Czech Republic and is claimed to be the largest benzene accident in the world, as about 400 tonnes of benzene were released.

== Response ==
Emergency responders, including Czech firefighters and Slovak counterparts, worked to contain the blaze. Residents in Hustopeče nad Bečvou and nearby areas were advised to stay indoors and keep windows closed as a precaution, though authorities reported that air quality measurements did not indicate dangerous levels of toxins. On 30 March 2025, the governor of the Olomouc Region declared a state of emergency. This declaration aimed to expedite remediation efforts, including the installation of barriers to prevent further spread of benzene and the extraction of the chemical from affected water sources.

== Cause and investigation ==
The cause of the derailment was under investigation, with authorities examining factors such as potential excessive speed. As of July 2025 it is believed the cause was primarily due to the train traveling at an excessive speed of 94 km/h at a switch where the speed limit was only 40 km/h. This overspeed caused the derailment as the train entered the station Hustopeče nad Bečvou.

== Aftermath ==
Cleanup operations involved pumping tonnes of benzene from the damaged tankers and implementing measures to contain and remediate soil and water contamination. Remediation efforts include digging pits between the railway tracks and the affected lake, and installing Larsen walls at depths of seven meters to prevent further benzene spread. Luděk Bláha from Masaryk University suggested that, while current measures are appropriate, accelerating soil extraction and aeration could enhance the situation. He explained that aeration introduces oxygen into the soil, causing benzene to evaporate into the air, where it degrades more rapidly. The financial damage from the incident was estimated at 1 billion CZK (€40.1 million).

On 3 April 2025, more than a month after the derailment, experts commenced the removal of soil contaminated with benzene from the accident site. The operation, conducted under stringent safety protocols, follows the complex task of clearing wreckage and destroyed railway infrastructure. The Ministry of the Environment described the soil extraction as highly risky, with firefighters monitoring benzene fumes in the air during the process. The excavated soil is being transported to a landfill for biological cleaning.

== See also ==
- 2015 Studénka train crash
- Milavče train crash
- Stéblová train disaster
