= Vranovice rail accident =

Rail accident in Vranovice, Moravia

Details
- Date: 7 July 1839
- Location: before Vranovice station in the direction from Brno
- Country: Austrian Empire
- Line: Emperor Ferdinand Northern Railway, Brno–Břeclav section
- Operator: Emperor Ferdinand Northern Railway
- Incident type: Collision
- Cause: Collision with a stationary train, driver’s inattention and excessive speed

Statistics
- Trains: special passenger trains for the ceremonial opening
- Deaths: 0
- Injured: 3–8 serious, several minor
- Damage: 2 carriages destroyed, several damaged

The Vranovice rail accident was a train collision at the Branowitz station (now Vranovice, Czech Republic) on the Břeclav–Brno line of the Emperor Ferdinand Northern Railway (KNFB) during the ceremonial inaugural run on 7 July 1839. It is considered the first railway accident in the Austrian Empire, which is nowadays the Czech Republic. The accident resulted in multiple safety adjustments.

== Ceremonial opening ==
As part of the ceremonial opening of the 144 km long Vienna–Břeclav–Brno railway line, the Emperor Ferdinand Northern Railway dispatched four trains from Vienna, hauled by decorated locomotives Bruna, Herkules, Gigant and Bucefalos (Bucephalus). Altogether they carried 1,125 passengers in 38 (or 36) carriages, though demand was much higher. Thousands of people watched and greeted the trains along the line, especially at stations. In Brno, the train was welcomed at the station (“dražiště”) by a guard of honour of the city guard and dignitaries from both secular and ecclesiastical authorities and corporations. The Brno magistrate held a banquet for 120 important guests at the Reduta Theatre.

The trains departed Vienna at 6:30 a.m.; the journey, including stops, lasted four hours and 15 minutes. After 4 p.m. the trains returned to Vienna.

=== Operating rules ===
Regulations set an 8-minute interval between following trains. The maximum line speed was 32 km/h, in blind curves, cuttings or gradients at most 15 km/h, and into stations no more than 4 km/h. Station stops were limited to 8 minutes.

== The accident ==
On the return trip from Brno to Vienna, the first train was delayed at Vranovice station due to complications with water replenishment. The second train stopped behind it, its rear cars extending before the entry switchyard of the station, at a point where the track curved in a cutting (approximately at today’s Lipová Street). The driver of the third train, Englishman John Williams, John Williame or William Whalley, driving Gigant, assumed the previous trains had already left. He only saw the rear of the standing train at a distance of about 260 metres, could not brake in time, and collided with it. The fourth train stopped safely behind.

Two carriages were destroyed and several were damaged. The reported number of serious injuries varies: some sources mention 8, some 7, some 5 or only 3. All sources mention also an unspecified number ("several" or "many") of minor injuries. Several doctors were travelling on the trains, who immediately treated the injured, and all, including the seriously hurt, continued by train to Vienna that same evening. The injured, mostly high-ranking citizens, were generously compensated by the railway.

== Investigation ==
The investigation found that the accident was probably caused by the driver of Gigant, who did not reduce speed according to the regulations and entered the station at high speed. Criminal proceedings were dropped, as a violation of the speed limit could not be proven. The railway company reassigned him as a locksmith in the Vienna workshops, and his contract was not renewed for 1840.

== Aftermath ==
The accident led to multiple adjustments in the railway sector in the Austrian Empire. The Aulic Council ordered the Emperor Ferdinand Northern Railway to increase the interval between trains to half an hour. It also became required to protect a standing train with a signal flag and to limit station stops to the necessary minimum.

The accident showed the need for line safety measures beyond reliance on drivers. For safety reasons, trains ran only by day until 1844.

=== Memorial ===
Since April 2012, the event has been marked at the location by a geocache. There is no monument at the site commemorating the accident because neither the railway administration nor the municipality took initiative to establish one.

== See also ==
- List of rail accidents in the Czech Republic
