= 2025 Dívčice train collision =

Rail crash in the South Bohemian Region, Czech Republic

Details
- Date: 20 November 2025 c.6:20 p.m. CET (UTC+01:00
- Location: Dívčice, South Bohemian Region
- Coordinates: 49.083°N 14.316°E
- Country: Czech Republic
- Operator: České dráhy (local train); České dráhy (express train)
- Service: Dívčice–České Budějovice (local train); České Budějovice–Plzeň (express train)
- Incident type: Head-on collision
- Cause: Passenger train overshot signal in red

Statistics
- Trains: ČD Class 242 R 658 express RegioPanter local train
- Vehicles: EMUs
- Deaths: 0
- Injured: 42–57 (5 seriously)
Route map
Accident location in the Czech Republic

On 20 November 2025, a collision occurred between two trains near the city of České Budějovice in the Czech Republic, injuring 42 people, including 5 seriously. The accident happened at around 6.20 am near the city of České Budějovice in the south of the country. A spokesperson for a regional hospital said that four people had been admitted with serious injuries, with the region's governor Martin Kuba remarked nine people suffered moderate injuries, while 25 others were lightly injured. The cause is currently under investigation, but it is believed one of them ran through a red signal.

== Incident ==
On the morning of 20 November 2025, the regular daily timetable on the southern Czech railway corridor between České Budějovice and Plzeň hl.n. was operating, but with reduced capacity, due to maintenance or a track outage. The result was that the normally double-track section between Zliv and Číčenice was restricted to single-track operation.

The first of the two trains involved was the express service R 658 Bezdrev scheduled from České Budějovice to Plzeň hl.n., hauled by electric locomotive ČD Class 242 242 238, pulling a consist of four modernised UIC-type Y and Z coaches. The second was a local passenger service, Os 8053, running from Dívčice to České Budějovice. The local train was formed by a two-part EMU RegioPanter 650 217.

Because of the track outage on the Zliv–Číčenice segment, the railway had imposed single-track working for that section. Under the timetable, the crossing (i.e. the passing of the two trains coming from opposite directions) was supposed to take place at Zliv: the express R 658 was to wait in Zliv and allow the oncoming Os 8053 to pass safely, before continuing toward Plzeň. Thus, the Os 8053 was travelling from Dívčice toward České Budějovice; R 658 was travelling from České Budějovice toward Plzeň, and both trains were scheduled to meet at Zliv on that morning’s timetable. Because of the disrupted track, the crossing point and traffic management were critical.

=== Crash ===
The R 658 express train struck the Os 8053 passenger train between Zliv and Dívčice stations around 6:20 am, forcing authorities to halt rail traffic on the line and arrange replacement bus services. Czech Railways confirmed the collision involved two of its trains during morning rush hour, when services typically carry commuters heading to work.

== Victims ==
42 people were reported to have been injured, including 5 seriously. This number was later advised up to 57.

== Aftermath ==
Emergency services said the crash had occurred in a region around 132 km (82 mi) south of the capital Prague. Images showed mainly damage to the front ends of the trains where they hit head-on. Firefighters had to free the driver of one train, and all passengers were evacuated. Seven rescue crews and a helicopter responded to the accident scene. České Budějovice hospital received five seriously injured passengers, according to spokeswoman Iva Nováková in a statement to Czech media. Rail traffic between České Budějovice and Plzeň was suspended after the crash, with buses being used as replacements.

Damage from the crash and clean up is estimated at CZK 150 million (roughly €6 million).

== Investigation ==
The Transport minister, Martin Kupka, said that authorities are now investigating the cause of the crash, but preliminary information suggests that one of the trains passed a red signal. The crash happened on a partly single-track section of line, the signalling there uses a certain relay-signal system (AŽD 71), but no automatic train-protection.

Investigators from the national Railway Inspection Authority have launched inquiries; as of now, it remains unclear if the cause was human error, technical failure, or a systemic issue (e.g. signalling, infrastructure).

Jan Kučera, Inspector General of the Railway Inspection said four inspectors are examining whether the incident resulted from human error, technical failure or systemic issues. One railway inspector happened to be travelling on the train during his commute from České Budějovice to Pilsen and was able to immediately assist with rescue efforts, Kučera later added. Czech media reported that one driver may have run a signal prohibiting travel, with both trains allegedly spotting each other from several hundred metres away but unable to stop in time.
