= Milavče train crash =

Train collision in the Czech Republic

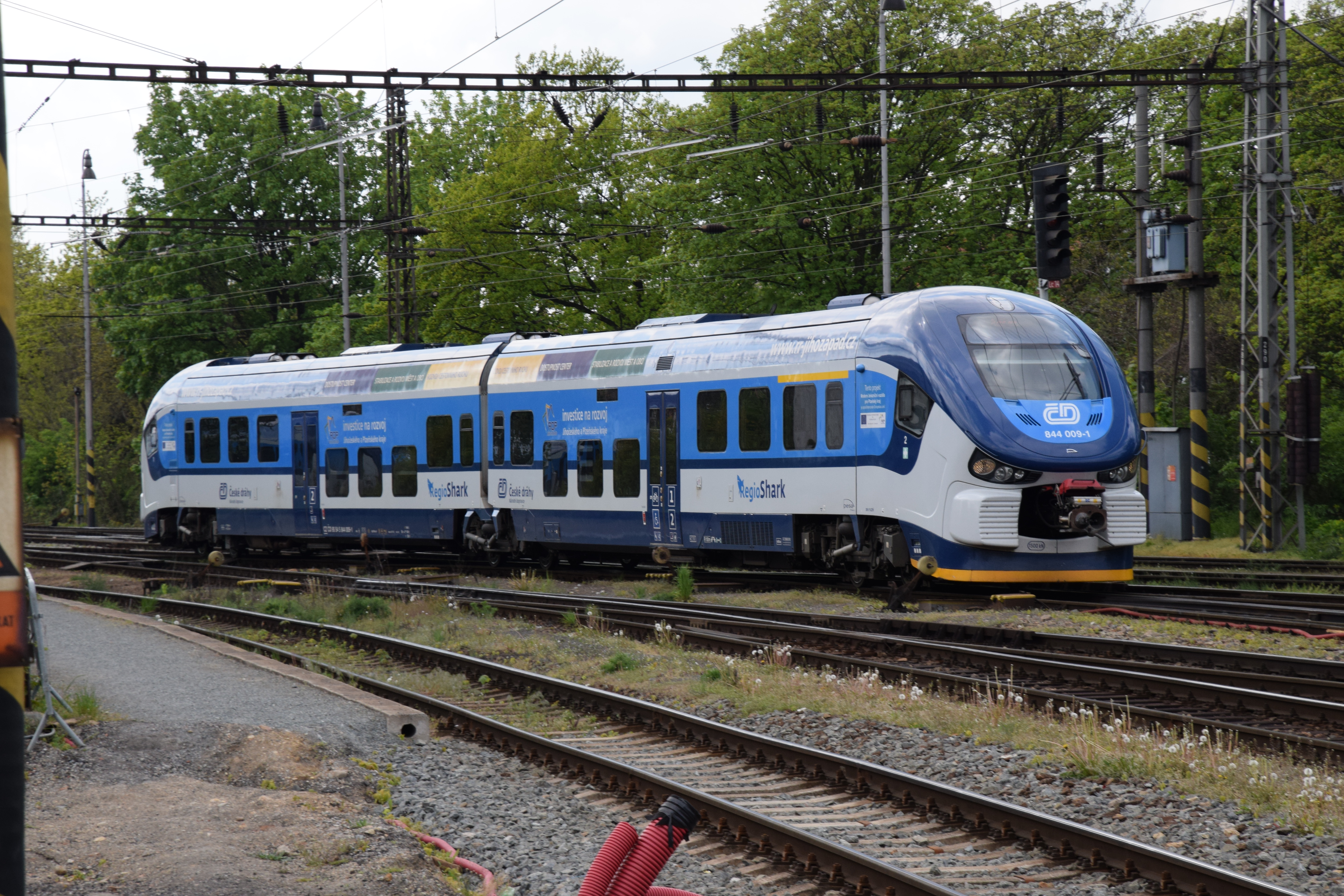
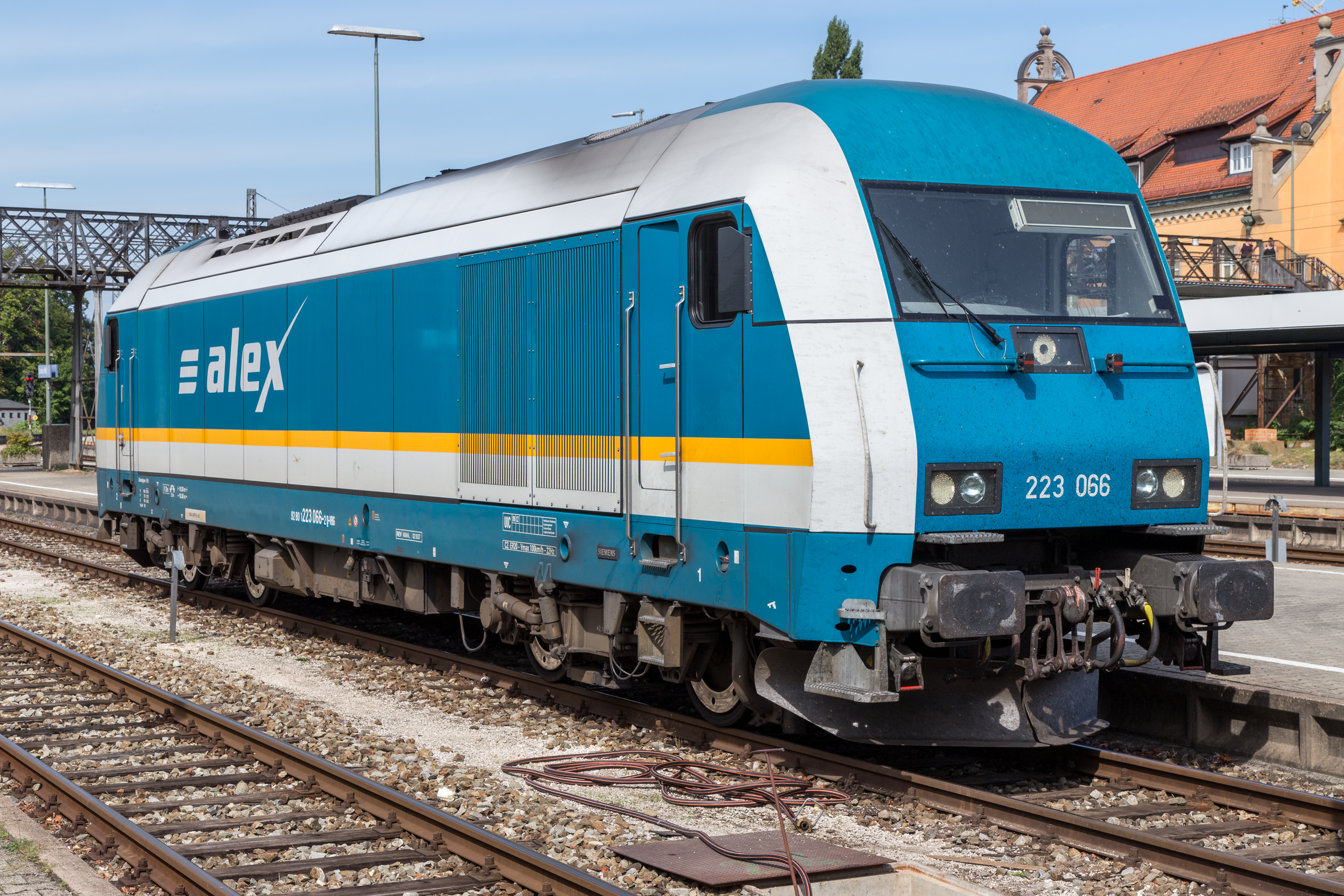
- A ČD Class 844 RegioShark diesel multiple unit, similar to that involved in the crash The Class 223 diesel locomotive 223-066 involved in the crash

- Milavče, Czech Republic

Details
- Date: 4 August 2021; 08:06 CEST (06:06 UTC)
- Location: Milavče, Domažlice District
- Coordinates: 49°27′55″N 12°59′6″E
- Country: Czech Republic
- Operator: České dráhy (local train); Die Länderbahn/České dráhy (express train)
- Service: Plzeň–Domažlice (local train); Munich–Prague (express train)
- Incident type: Head-on collision

Statistics
- Trains: 2
- Passengers: ~60 (express train); ~7 (local train)
- Deaths: 3
- Injured: 67
- Damage: Kč 178,000,000

On 4 August 2021, two passenger trains collided at Milavče in the Czech Republic. Three people were killed and 67 were injured.

== Background ==
The collision occurred at 8:06 a.m. local time on the outskirts of the village of Milavče. The passenger train of the České dráhy Os 7406 was travelling on the route Plzeň hlavní nádraží - Domažlice and consisted of a RegioShark diesel unit (844.006-7). The international express Ex 351 Západní expres ("Western Express") went from München Hbf to Praha hlavní nádraží and consisted of a Siemens ER20 diesel locomotive (223.066-2) and four passenger cars. On the German territory, the train was operated by the German carrier Die Länderbahn GmbH under the brand name "alex", and on the Czech territory was operated by České dráhy. From München to Schwandorf, the train was driven by a German driver and from Schwandorf to Praha was driven by a Czech driver.

Despite its importance and load, the line from Plzeň to Domažlice is single-track, so opposite coming trains must cross at stations or at passing loops. The line is equipped with standard security, but not with the ETCS.

== Crash ==
According to the timetable, the trains were to cross at the Radonice passing loop, near Milavče. The express arrived at the passing loop first and therefore had to wait for the oncoming passenger train.

At the entrance to the passing loop, the yellow light (the "Warning" signal) was on at the entrance signal, informing the driver that the red light (the "Stop" signal) was on at the departure signal and he needed to start slowing down. However, the express driver did not start to slow down and kept to the maximum speed, which in this section is 80 kph.

Meanwhile, the passenger train left the Milavče stop, about 900 metres away from the passing loop, and drove towards the passing loop. Without stopping, the express passed the departure signal in the "Stop" position, left the passing loop back onto the single-track line, and collided head-on with the passenger train a few seconds later. Both drivers applied the speed brake, but the collision could not be avoided. The express was travelling at approximately 77 kph at the time of impact, and the passenger train was at 40 kph. The faster and heavier express train pushed the passenger train back as a result of the impact by approximately 75 metres.

== Aftermath ==
The impact severely damaged both trains. The front part of the RegioShark unit was badly damaged, the driver's cab was completely demolished and the front bogie broke off and lay loose on the tracks between the trains.

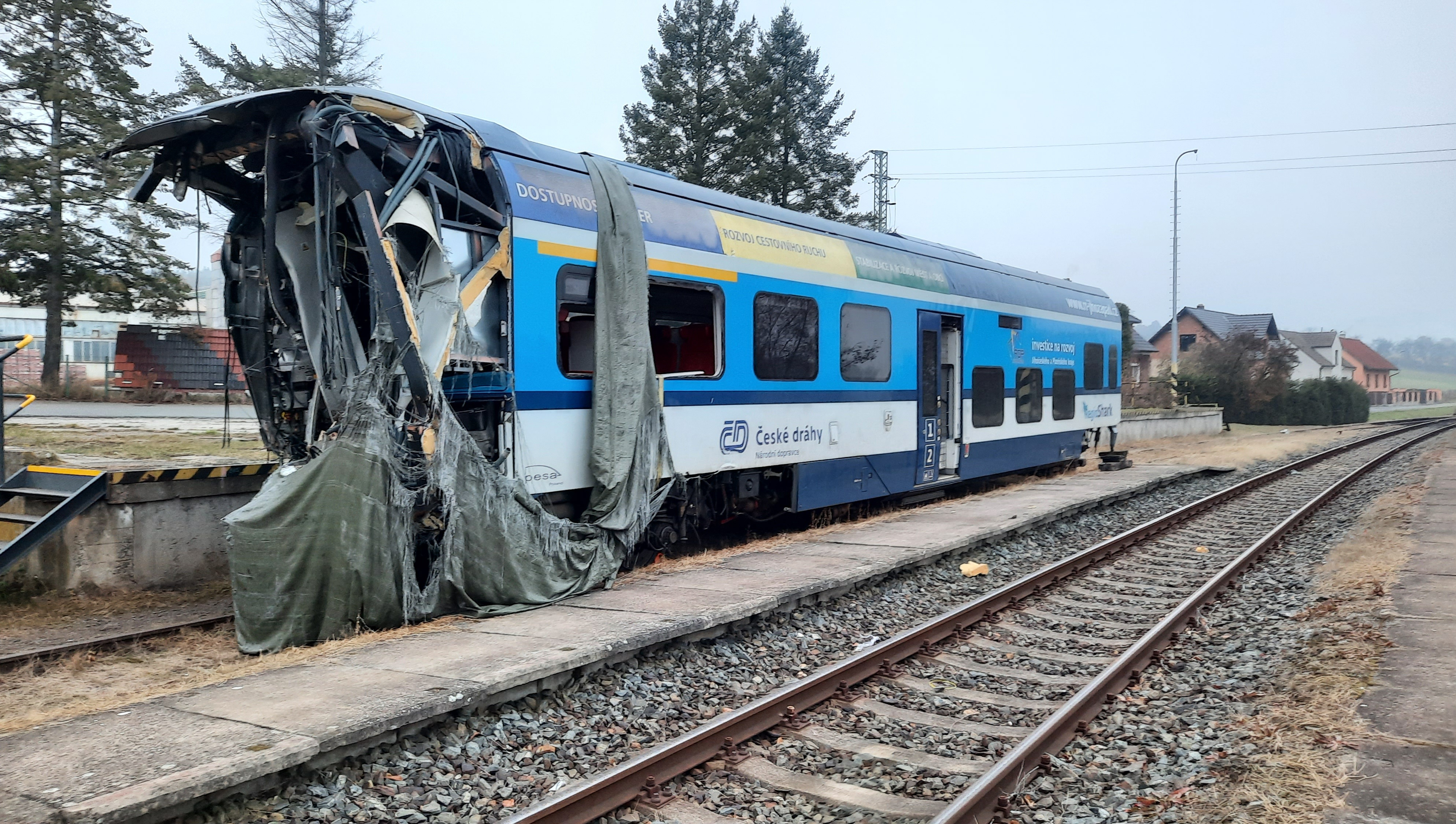
The destroyed front part of the RegioShark unit involved in the crash, parked at the Blížejov train station in October 2021. The less damaged rear part was taken to the depot in Plzeň as a source of spare parts, the more damaged part (pictured) was later scrapped.

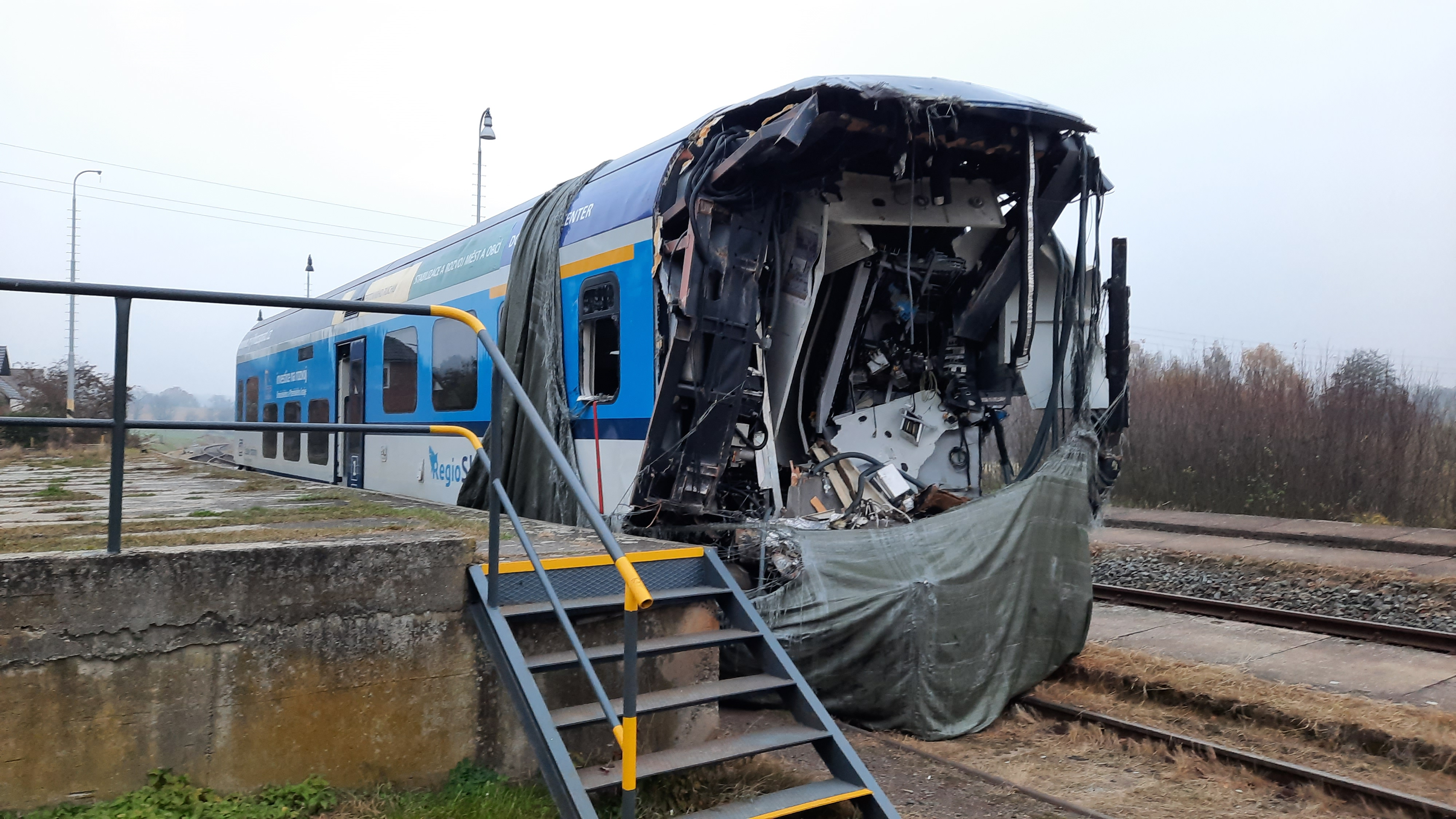
The remains of the driver's cab

The Siemens locomotive pulling the express derailed with three axles on impact and its front end, including the driver's cab, was completely destroyed. The first car behind the locomotive was pushed onto the locomotive by the other cars, partially derailed and broke. The remaining three cars were less severely damaged.

The first report of the crash was received by emergency operators at 8:08 a.m. All components of the Integrated Rescue System immediately rushed to the site. Dozens of rescuers and firefighters, including three helicopters of the Air Rescue Service and a helicopter of the Police of the Czech Republic, intervened at the scene. In addition to Czech rescuers, several teams of rescuers and firefighters from Germany intervened to take care of the German-speaking passengers. The injured were taken to hospitals in Plzeň, Domažlice, Klatovy, Stod and Praha, while 10 German-speaking passengers were taken to hospitals in Germany. Rescuers treated a total of 67 injured people.

Three people, a passenger from the passenger train and both drivers, did not survive the collision. The driver of the express was presumed missing for a few hours before his body was recovered from the locomotive by firefighters seven hours after the crash.

Minister of Transport Karel Havlíček also arrived at the scene, confirming the three victims and saying that the cause of the accident was probably the express running through the "Stop" signal. The line remained closed after the accident, with the first train passing the site at 18:30 on 6 August 2021.

== Investigations ==
Drážní inspekce (Railway Inspectorate) launched an investigation on the day of the crash. In March 2022, it released its final report which stated that the accident was caused by the driver of the express train who failed to stop at the signal in the "Stop" position. It ruled out poor signal visibility or a technical fault on the locomotive.

The investigation was also launched by the Czech Police on suspicion of committing the crime of general danger due to negligence. The investigation was eventually postponed because the express driver, who was at fault, died in the collision.

== See also ==
- 2025 Hustopeče nad Bečvou train crash
- 2015 Studénka train crash
- Stéblová train disaster
