= Blížejov =

- Municipality
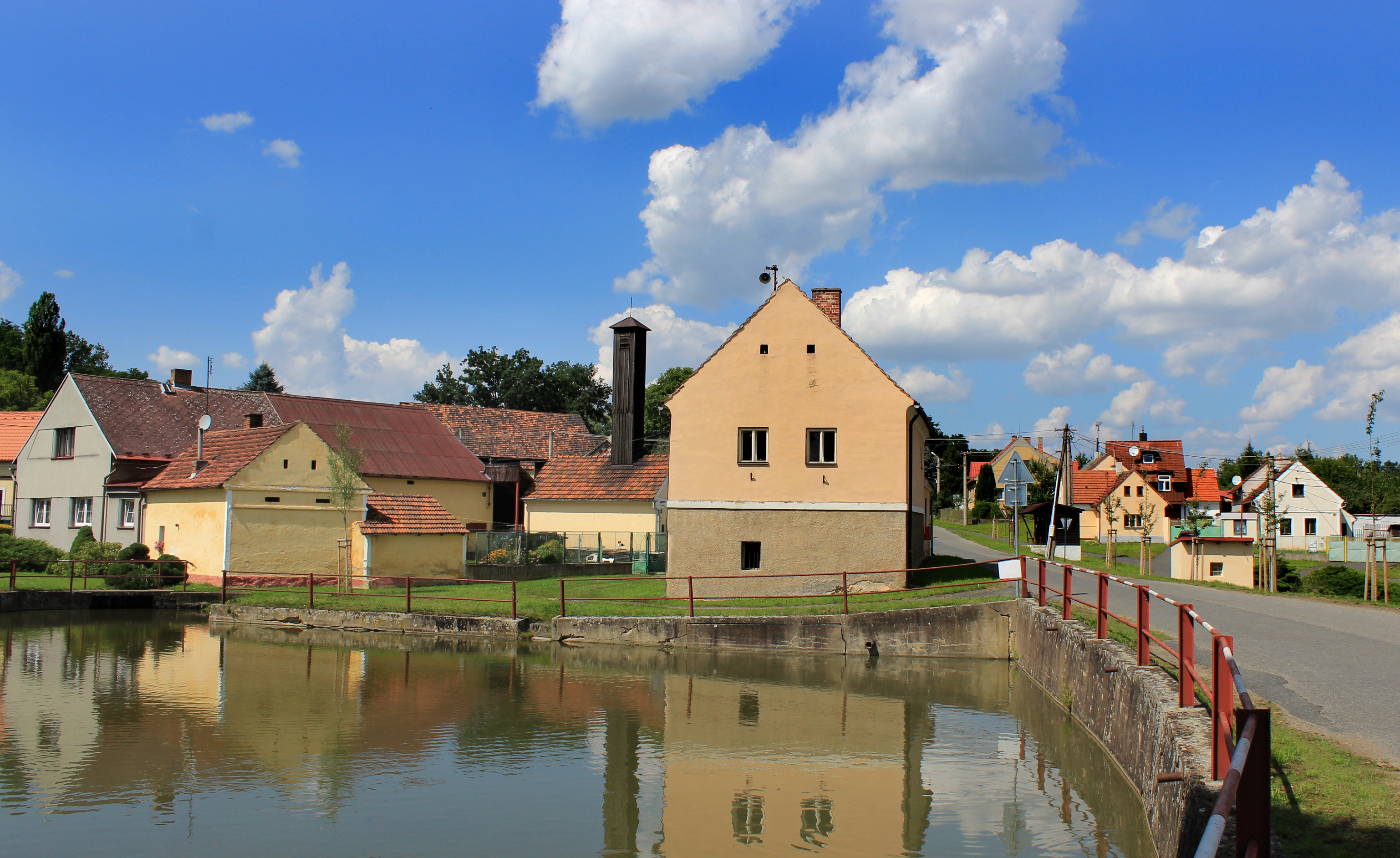
- Malonice, a part of Blížejov

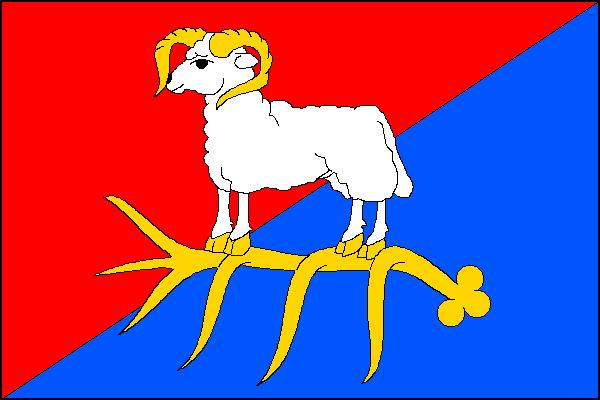
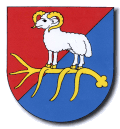
- Flag Coat of arms

- Location in the Czech Republic
- Coordinates: 49°30′10″N 12°59′15″E
- Country: Czech Republic
- Region: Plzeň
- District: Domažlice
- First mentioned: 1324

Area
  - Total: 25.00 km^{2} (9.65 sq mi)
- Elevation: 383 m (1,257 ft)

Population (2026-01-01)
  - Total: 1,561
  - Density: 62.44/km^{2} (161.7/sq mi)
- Time zone: UTC+1 (CET)
  - Summer (DST): UTC+2 (CEST)
- Postal codes: 345 45, 346 01
- Website: www.blizejov.cz

Blížejov is a municipality and village in Domažlice District in the Plzeň Region of the Czech Republic. It has about 1,600 inhabitants.

== Administrative division ==
Blížejov consists of eight municipal parts (in brackets population according to the 2021 census):

- Blížejov (1,028)
- Chotiměř (107)
- Františkov (14)
- Lštění (124)
- Malonice (42)
- Nahošice (72)
- Přívozec (128)
- Výrov (11)

== Etymology ==
The initial name of the village was Bližejov. The name was derived from the personal name Bližej, meaning "Bližej's (court)".

== Geography ==
Blížejov is located about 8 kilometres (5 mi) northeast of Domažlice and 38 km (24 mi) southwest of Plzeň. It lies on the border between the Podčeskoleská Hills and Plasy Uplands. The highest point is at 501 m (1,644 ft) above sea level. The Zubřina Stream flows through the town.

== History ==
The first written mention of Blížejov is from 1324. The village used to be divided into several parts owned by different noble families.

== Demographics ==
Historical population

Year	Pop.	±%
1869	1,713	—
1880	1,829	+6.8%
1890	1,812	−0.9%
1900	1,932	+6.6%
1910	1,962	+1.6%

Year	Pop.	±%
1921	1,960	−0.1%
1930	1,915	−2.3%
1950	1,467	−23.4%
1961	1,508	+2.8%
1970	1,337	−11.3%

Year	Pop.	±%
1980	1,200	−10.2%
1991	1,047	−12.7%
2001	1,036	−1.1%
2011	1,420	+37.1%
2021	1,526	+7.5%

Source: Censuses

== Transport ==
Blížejov is located on the railway line Plzeň–Domažlice.

== Sights ==
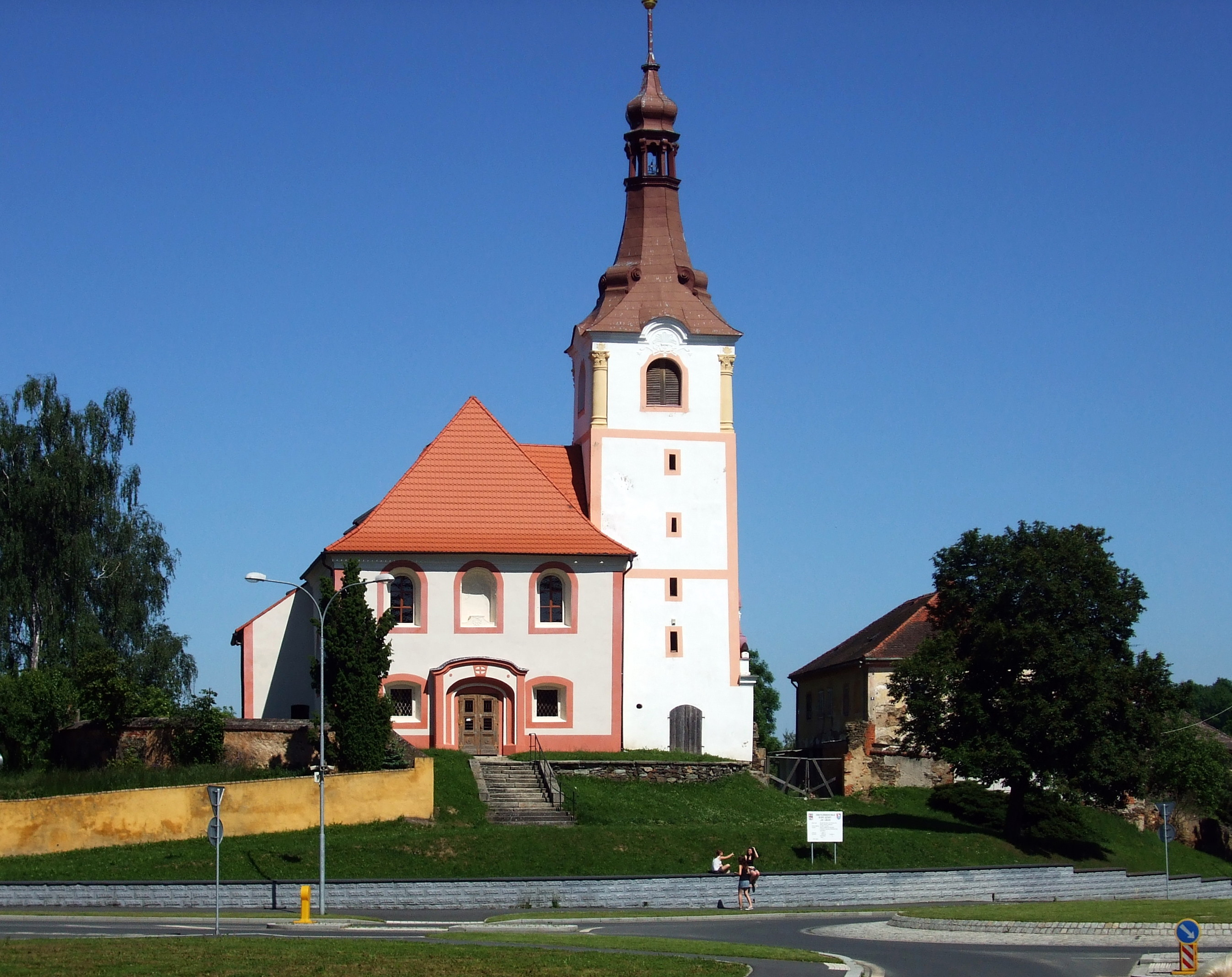
Church of Saint Martin

The main landmark of Blížejov is the Church of Saint Martin. It was built in the Gothic style in the mid-14th century. In the first half of the 18th century, it was modified in the Baroque style.

In Lštění is a late Gothic tower-shaped fortress. It was probably built in the mid-15th century. In the mid-16th century, a Renaissance castle was built next to the fortress, but it was later destroyed. The fortress was rebuilt into a granary in 1769. Today the building is privately owned.
