= Dívčice =

- Municipality
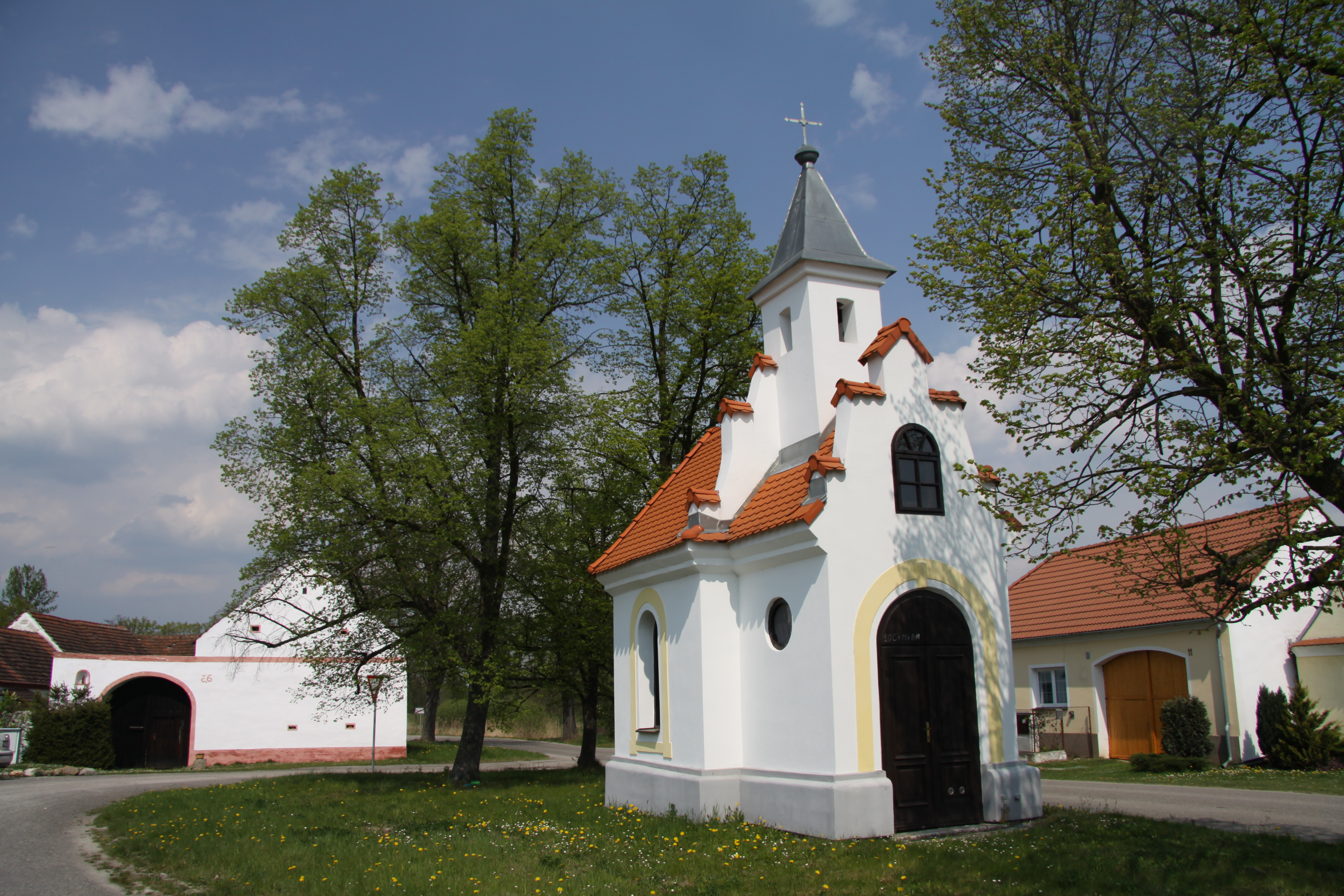
- Chapel of Saint John of Nepomuk

- Flag Coat of arms

- Location in the Czech Republic
- Coordinates: 49°6′31″N 14°18′34″E
- Country: Czech Republic
- Region: South Bohemian
- District: České Budějovice
- First mentioned: 1358

Area
  - Total: 19.52 km^{2} (7.54 sq mi)
- Elevation: 394 m (1,293 ft)

Population (2026-01-01)
  - Total: 627
  - Density: 32.1/km^{2} (83.2/sq mi)
- Time zone: UTC+1 (CET)
  - Summer (DST): UTC+2 (CEST)
- Postal code: 373 48
- Website: www.divcice.cz

Dívčice is a municipality and village in České Budějovice District in the South Bohemian Region of the Czech Republic. It has about 600 inhabitants.

== Administrative division ==
Dívčice consists of five municipal parts (in brackets population according to the 2021 census):

- Dívčice (224)
- Česká Lhota (71)
- Dubenec (87)
- Novosedly (60)
- Zbudov (109)

== Etymology ==
The initial name of the village was Dievčice. It was derived from the personal name Dievka or Dievek, meaning "the village of Dievka's/Dievek's people".

== Geography ==
Dívčice is located about 18 kilometres (11 mi) northwest of České Budějovice. It lies in a flat landscape in the České Budějovice Basin. The stream Bezdrevský potok flows through the southern part of the municipality.

The municipal territory is rich in fishponds, the largest of which is Blatec with an area of 94.2 hectares (233 acres).

== History ==
The first written mention of Dívčice is from 1358. From the middle of the 16th century, the village belonged to the Hluboká estate.

== Demographics ==
Historical population

Year	Pop.	±%
1869	883	—
1880	982	+11.2%
1890	1,026	+4.5%
1900	962	−6.2%
1910	1,049	+9.0%

Year	Pop.	±%
1921	1,043	−0.6%
1930	1,108	+6.2%
1950	970	−12.5%
1961	879	−9.4%
1970	782	−11.0%

Year	Pop.	±%
1980	667	−14.7%
1991	540	−19.0%
2001	501	−7.2%
2011	529	+5.6%
2021	551	+4.2%

Source: Censuses

== Transport ==
Dívčice is located on the railway lines České Budějovice–Písek and České Budějovice–Strakonice.

== Sights ==
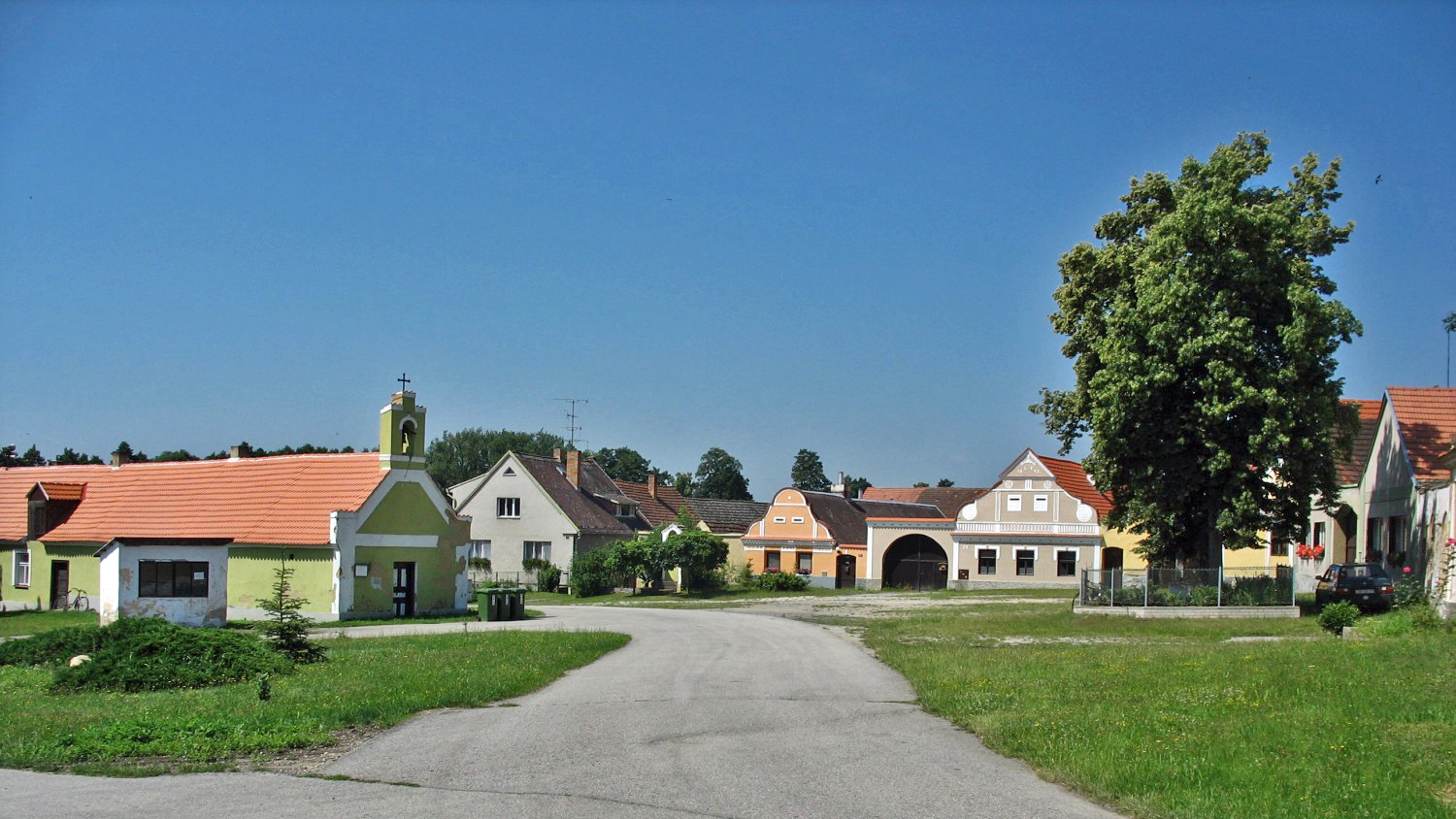
Centre of Zbudov

The village of Zbudov is well preserved and is protected as a village monument zone. The current appearance of the village is the result of reconstruction after 1842, when the village was badly damaged by fire. The houses have valuable, richly decorated gables in the Folk Baroque style.

The main landmark of the municipality is Monument to Josef Kubata. It commemorates a local advocatus who was executed in 1581 for rebellion against the authorities, and who later became a symbol of free peasants in an idealised form. The monument is located in a meadow near Zbudov, near the place where he was allegedly executed. It was created in 1904 and consists of a larger-than-life statue on a tapering pedestal.

The main landmark of the village of Dívčice is the Chapel of Saint John of Nepomuk, built in neo-Romanesque style.
