= Šakvice train collision =

1953 train crash in Czechoslovakia

Šakvice train disaster

Details
- Date: 24 December 1953
- Location: Šakvice
- Coordinates: 48°54′51″N 16°42′05″E
- Country: Czechoslovakia
- Incident type: Collision

Statistics
- Trains: 2
- Deaths: 103
- Injured: 83
Route map
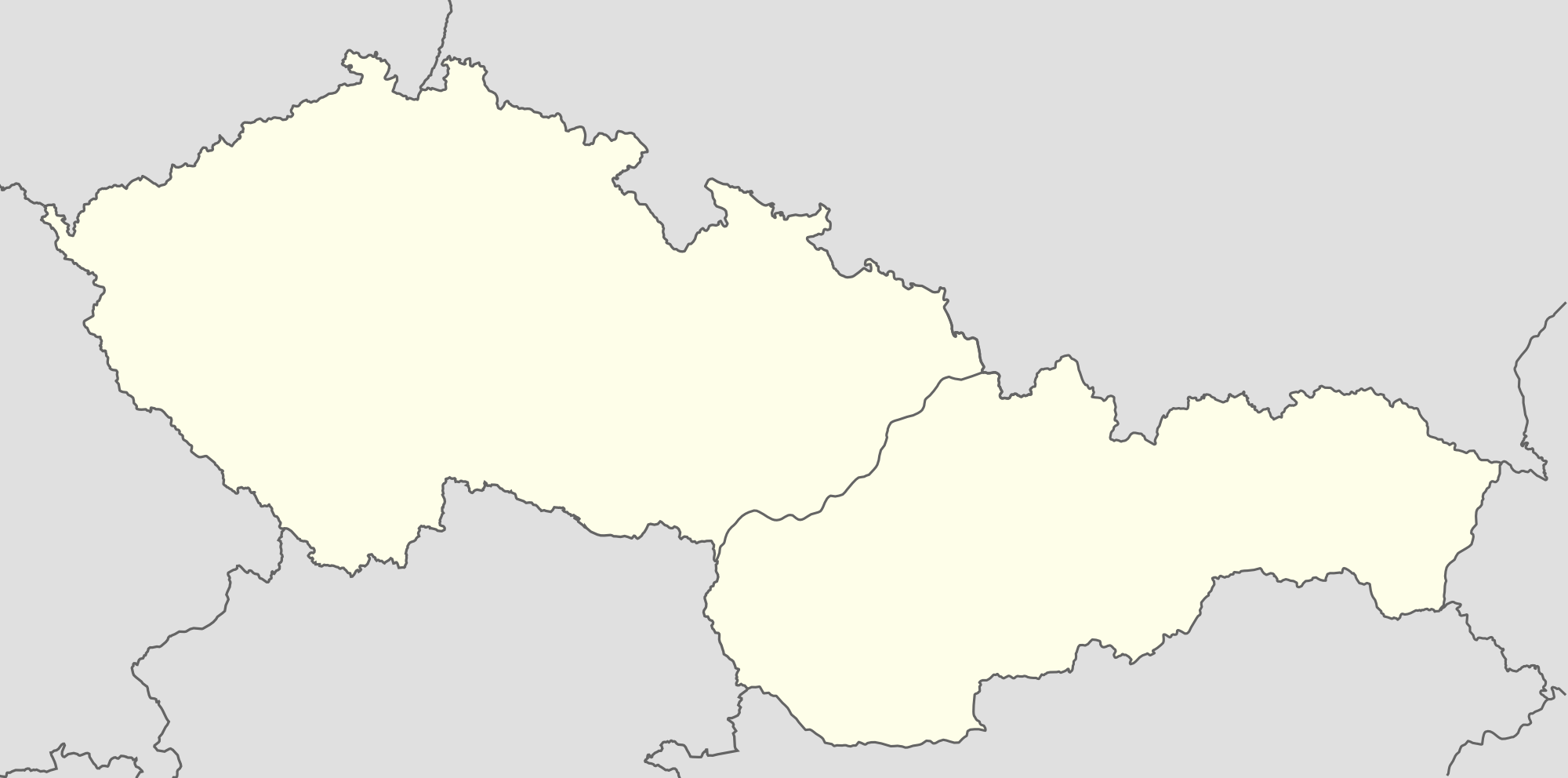
Accident location in Czechoslovakia

The Šakvice train disaster occurred on 24 December 1953 in Czechoslovakia (now the Czech Republic). A local train was standing at the Šakvice station (about 35 km south of Brno), when the Prague-Bratislava express ran into it at full speed, resulting in 103 deaths and a further 83 injuries.

The Ministry of the Interior said there was gross negligence by several railwaymen who had since been arrested. Other reports said that the express train crew had consumed a number of bottles of wine during their service, thus being completely drunk at the time of the crash. Other sources have over 100, or even 186 deaths. However, due to the totalitarian communist regime of the time, the publicity of the event was minimal.

This disaster was one of the 20 most serious rail incidents by death toll at the time, and by far the worst in Czechoslovak history until the 1960 Stéblová train disaster.
