= Ústí nad Labem derailment =

2010 railway incident in the Czech Republic

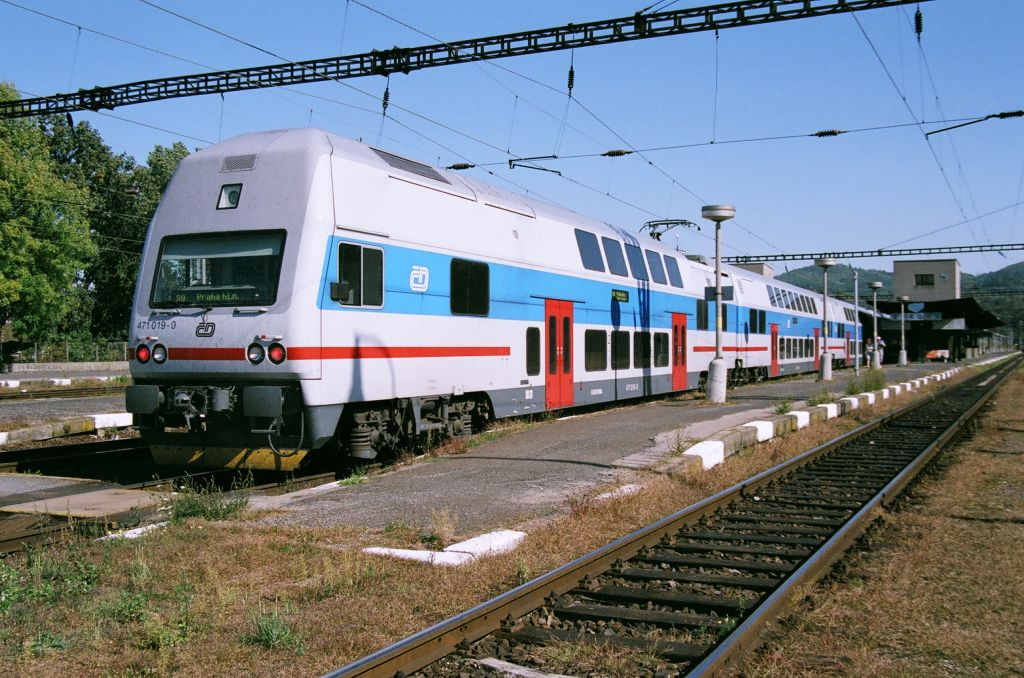
- A ČD Class 471 CityElefant trainset

Details
- Date: 28 June 2010; 16:47 CEST (14:47 UTC)
- Location: Ústí nad Labem
- Coordinates: 50°38′35″N 14°02′39″E
- Country: Czech Republic
- Line: Prague – Ústí nad Labem
- Operator: České dráhy
- Incident type: Derailment
- Cause: Excessive speed

Statistics
- Trains: 1
- Deaths: 1
- Injured: 11
- Damage: CZK 65,000,000 (2010 est.) CZK 70.9 million (€2.8 million) (final cost)

The Ústí nad Labem derailment occurred on 28 June 2010 when a CityElefant train derailed at Ústí nad Labem, Czech Republic. The driver was killed and 11 passengers were injured.

== Train ==
The train involved was a ČD Class 471 CityElefant double deck electric multiple unit that had been manufactured in 2001.

== Derailment ==
At 16:47 CEST, the train was derailed on approach to its final scheduled stop, Ústí nad Labem hlavní nádraží, in the southern suburb of Vaňov. It was almost at the end of its journey from Prague when the accident happened. The leading carriage smashed into a concrete wall after being derailed. The driver was killed and 11 passengers were injured, including two with serious injuries. The train's cab car was irreparably destroyed, while the other two cars survived with only minor structural defects. The line, which forms part of an international railway corridor linking Prague and Berlin, was closed following the accident, although one track was later reopened to traffic but requiring the use of diesel locomotives as the overhead wiring had been damaged.

== Cause ==
Early reports stated that at the time of the crash, the train was travelling at 108 kilometres per hour (67 mph) while the speed limit at that location was 50 kilometres per hour (31 mph). The most probable cause of the disaster was either a fault of the brakes or the driver's inattention. In March 2011, the Railway Inspectorate announced that the driver had not been "medically fit", and that the immediate cause of the crash was speeding.
