= Milavče =

Municipality in the Plzeň Region of the Czech Republic

- Municipality
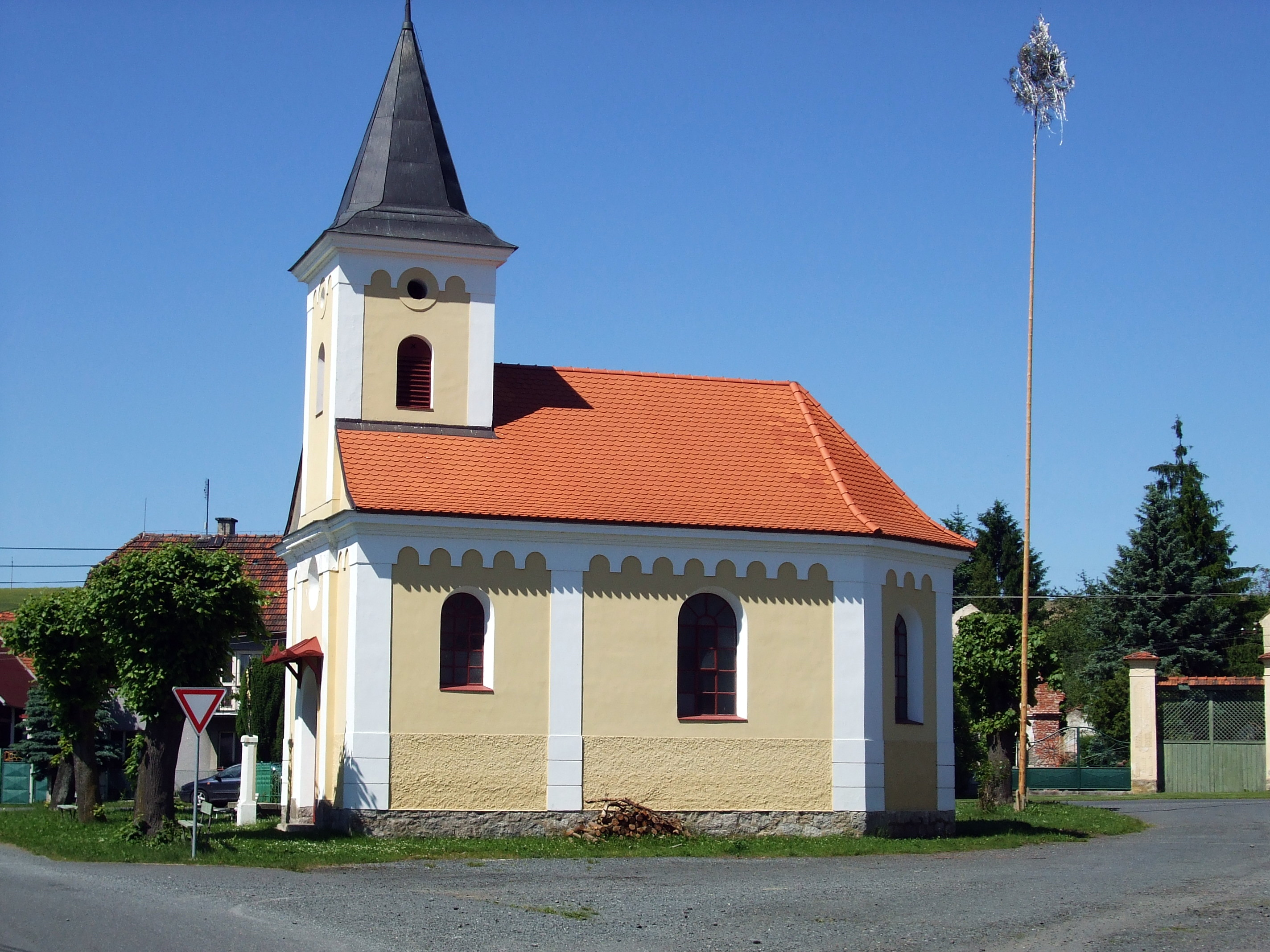
- Chapel of Saint James the Great

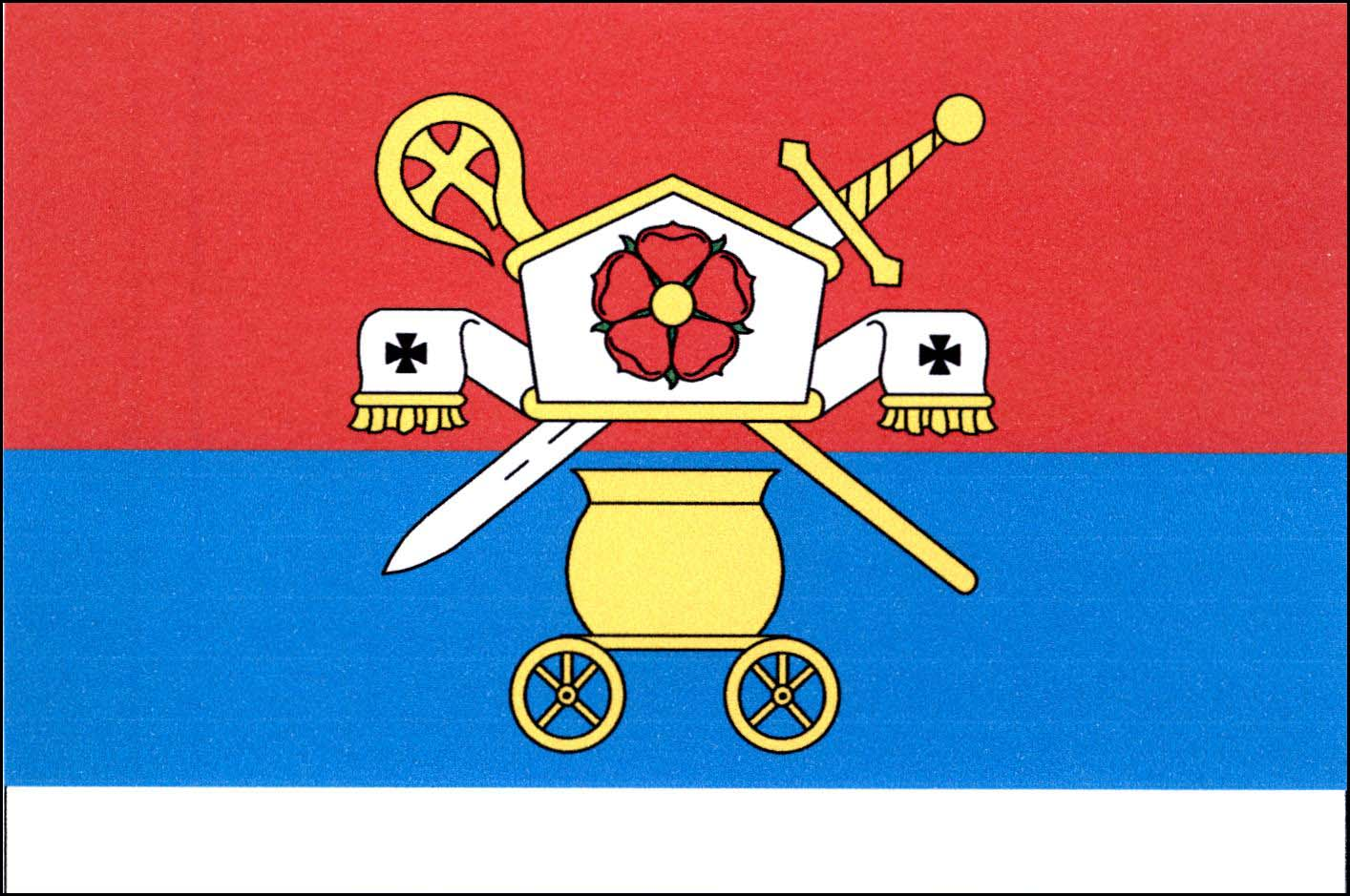
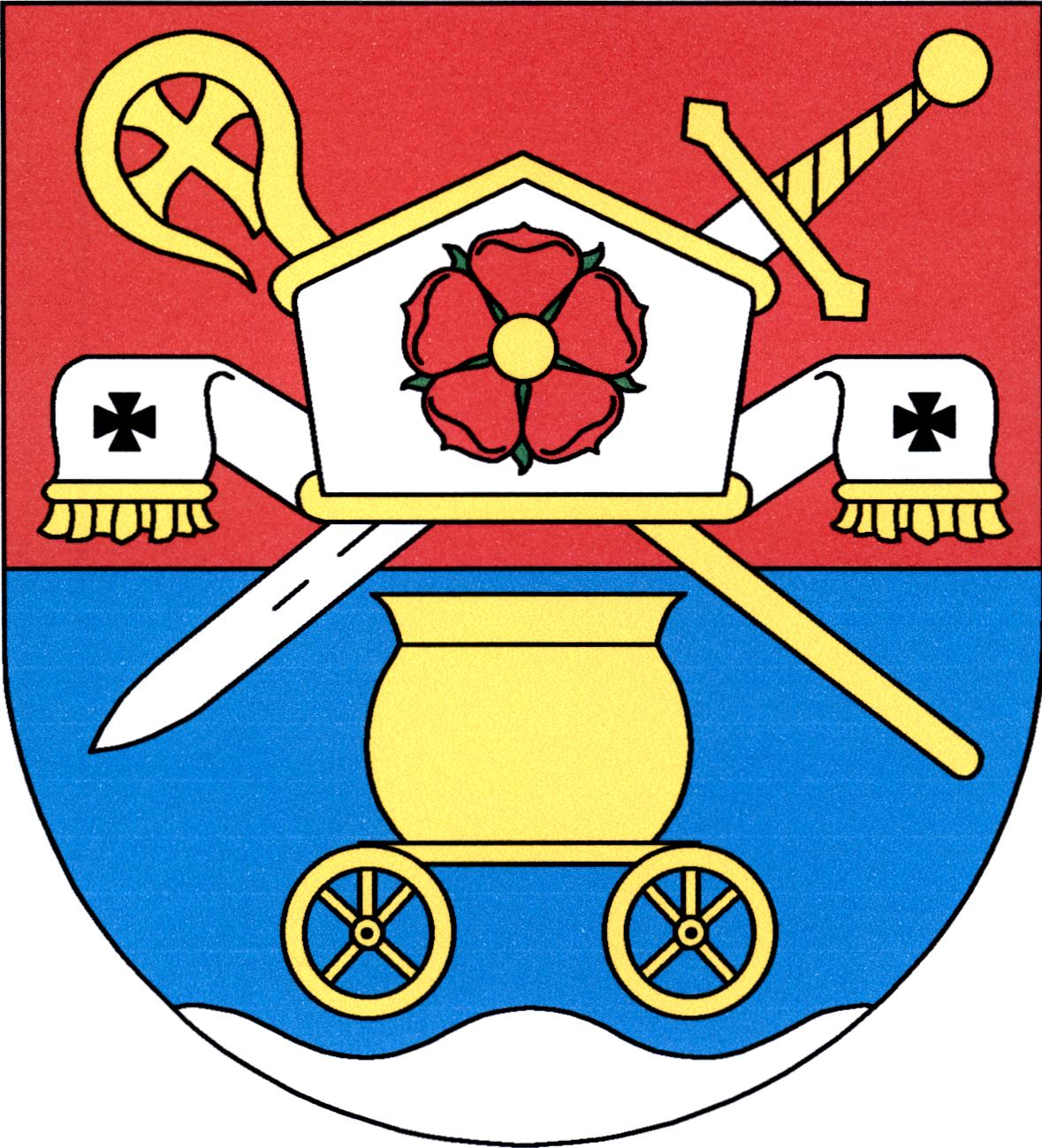
- Flag Coat of arms

- Location in the Czech Republic
- Coordinates: 49°28′1″N 12°58′51″E
- Country: Czech Republic
- Region: Plzeň
- District: Domažlice
- First mentioned: 1302

Area
  - Total: 12.19 km^{2} (4.71 sq mi)
- Elevation: 393 m (1,289 ft)

Population (2026-01-01)
  - Total: 595
  - Density: 48.8/km^{2} (126/sq mi)
- Time zone: UTC+1 (CET)
  - Summer (DST): UTC+2 (CEST)
- Postal code: 344 01
- Website: www.milavce.cz

Milavče is a municipality and village in Domažlice District in the Plzeň Region of the Czech Republic. It has about 600 inhabitants.

== Administrative division ==
Milavče consists of three municipal parts (in brackets population according to the 2021 census):

- Milavče (418)
- Božkovy (23)
- Radonice (144)

== Etymology ==
The initial name of the village was Milaveč. The name was derived from the personal name Milavec, meaning "Milavec's (court)".

== Geography ==
Milavče is located about 5 kilometres (3 mi) northeast of Domažlice and 41 km (25 mi) southwest of Plzeň. It lies in the Podčeskoleská Hills. The highest point is at 500 m (1,640 ft) above sea level. The Zubřina Stream flows through the municipality.

== History ==
Evidence of a bronze age culture has been found here.

The first written mention of Milavče is from 1302. From 1357 to 1598, it was part of the Horšovský Týn estate and shared its owners. From 1598, it belonged to the Domažlice estate.

The village of Radonice was first mentioned in 1310, when it was owned by the Ostrov Monastery in Davle. Božkovy was first mentioned in 1472.

On 4 August 2021, two trains collided near the village.

== Demographics ==
Historical population

Year	Pop.	±%
1869	906	—
1880	947	+4.5%
1890	897	−5.3%
1900	954	+6.4%
1910	1,018	+6.7%

Year	Pop.	±%
1921	961	−5.6%
1930	942	−2.0%
1950	728	−22.7%
1961	725	−0.4%
1970	667	−8.0%

Year	Pop.	±%
1980	579	−13.2%
1991	567	−2.1%
2001	577	+1.8%
2011	576	−0.2%
2021	585	+1.6%

Source: Censuses

== Transport ==
Milavče is located on the railway line Plzeň–Domažlice.

== Sights ==
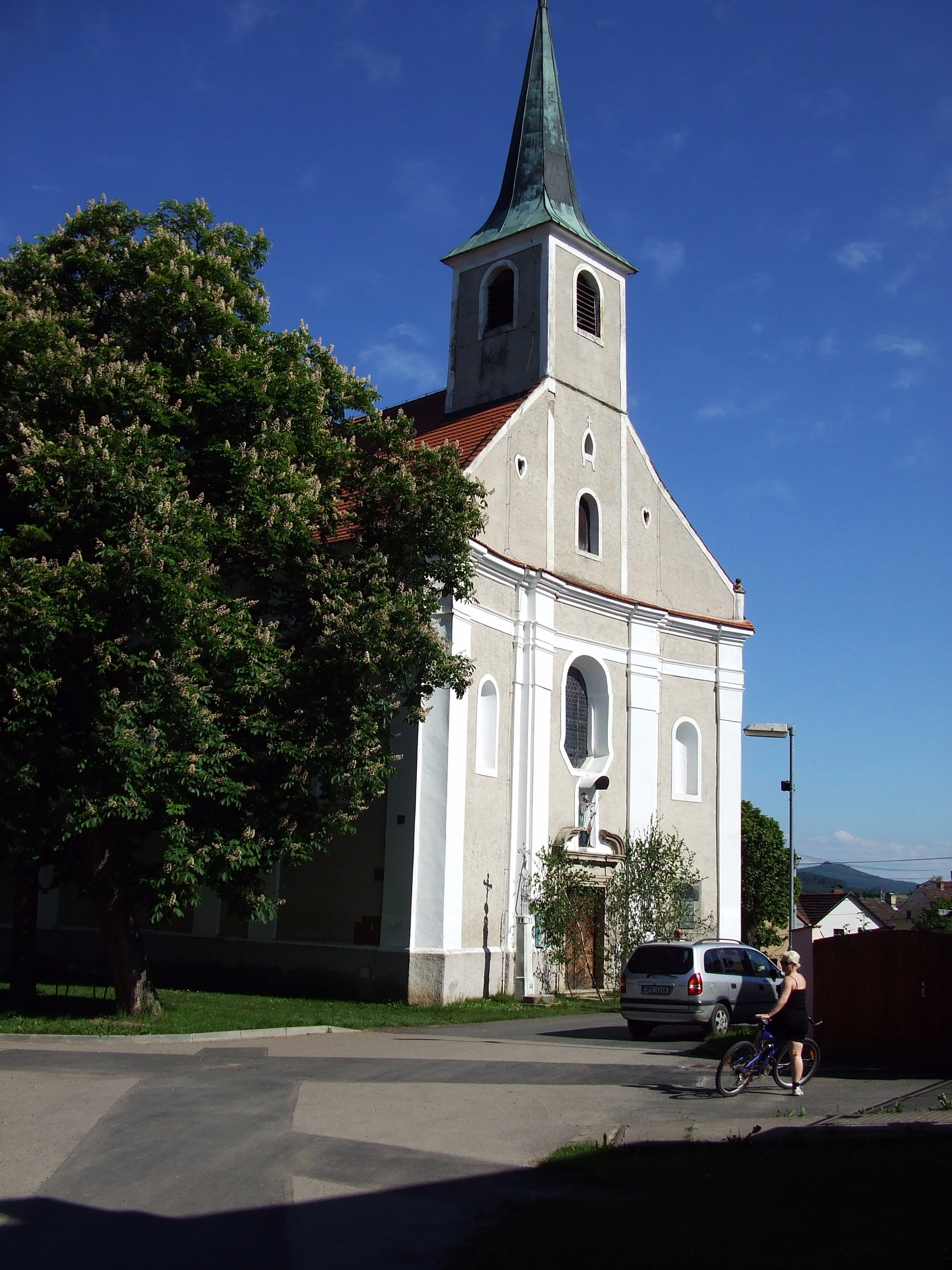
Church of Saint Adalbert

The main landmark of Milavče is the Church of Saint Adalbert. It was built in the Baroque style in 1741–1748 on the site of an old chapel. The tower and sacristy were added in the 19th century.

== Notable people ==
- Josef Váchal (1884–1969), writer and painter
