= Stéblová =

- Municipality
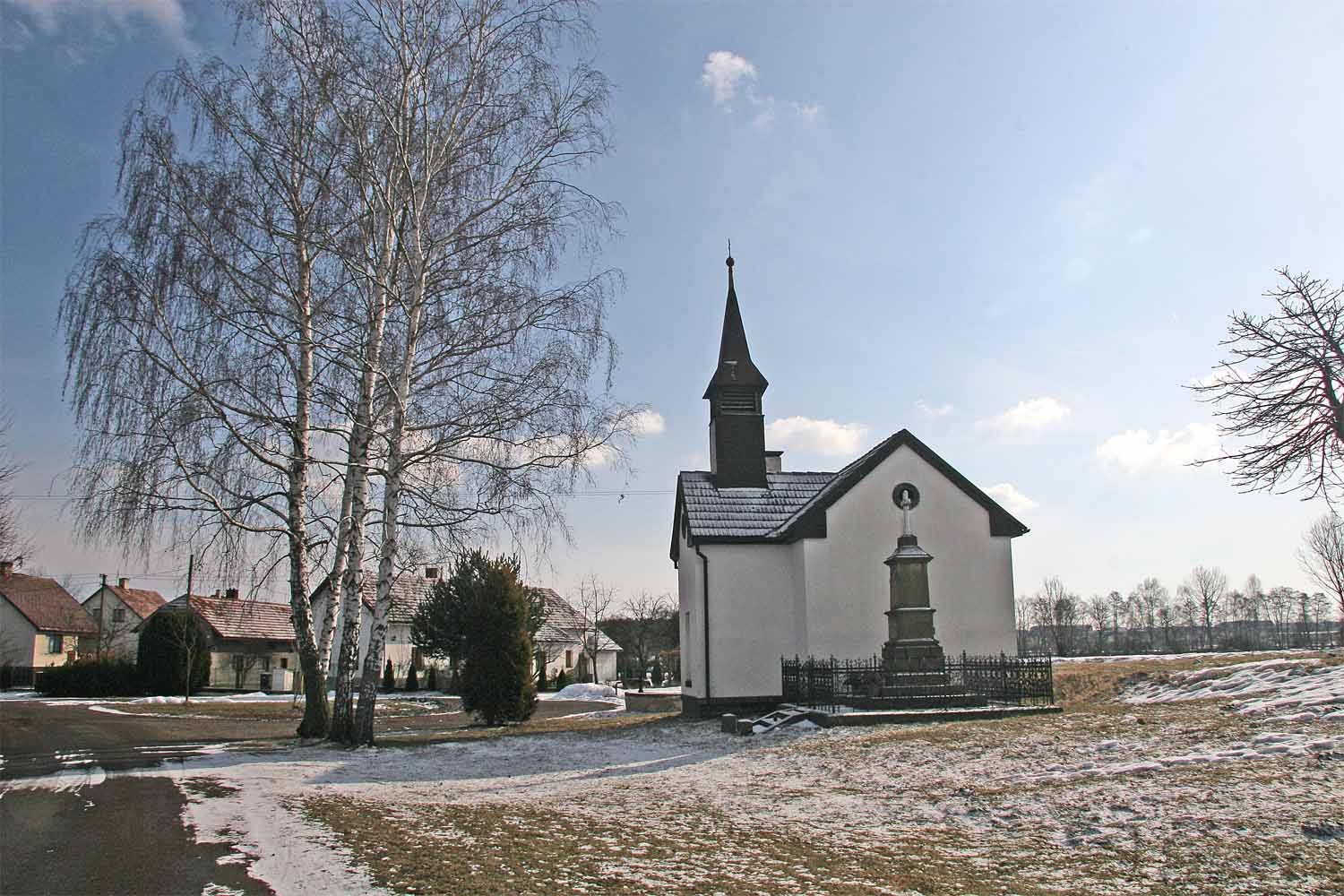
- Chapel in Stéblová

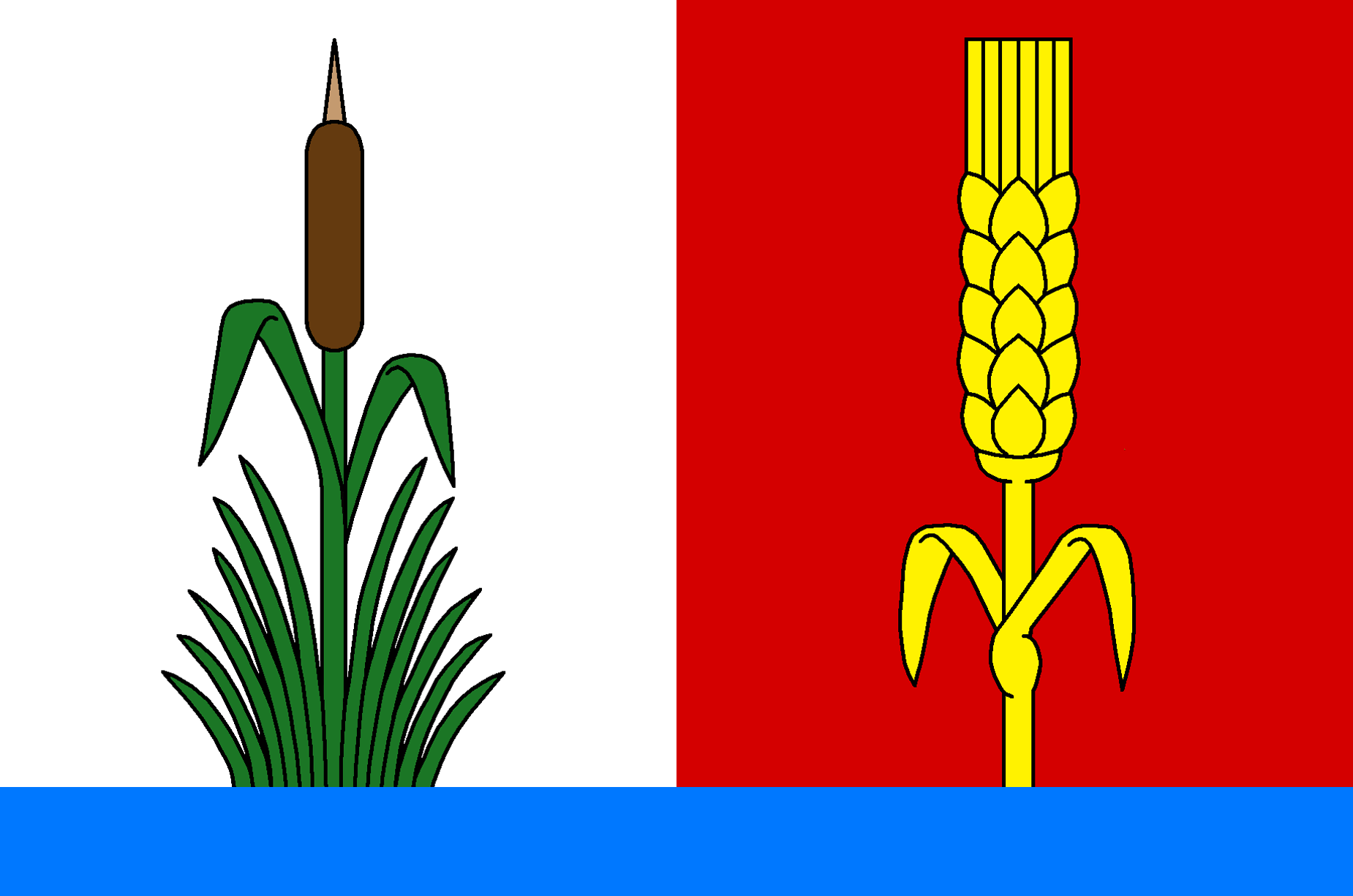
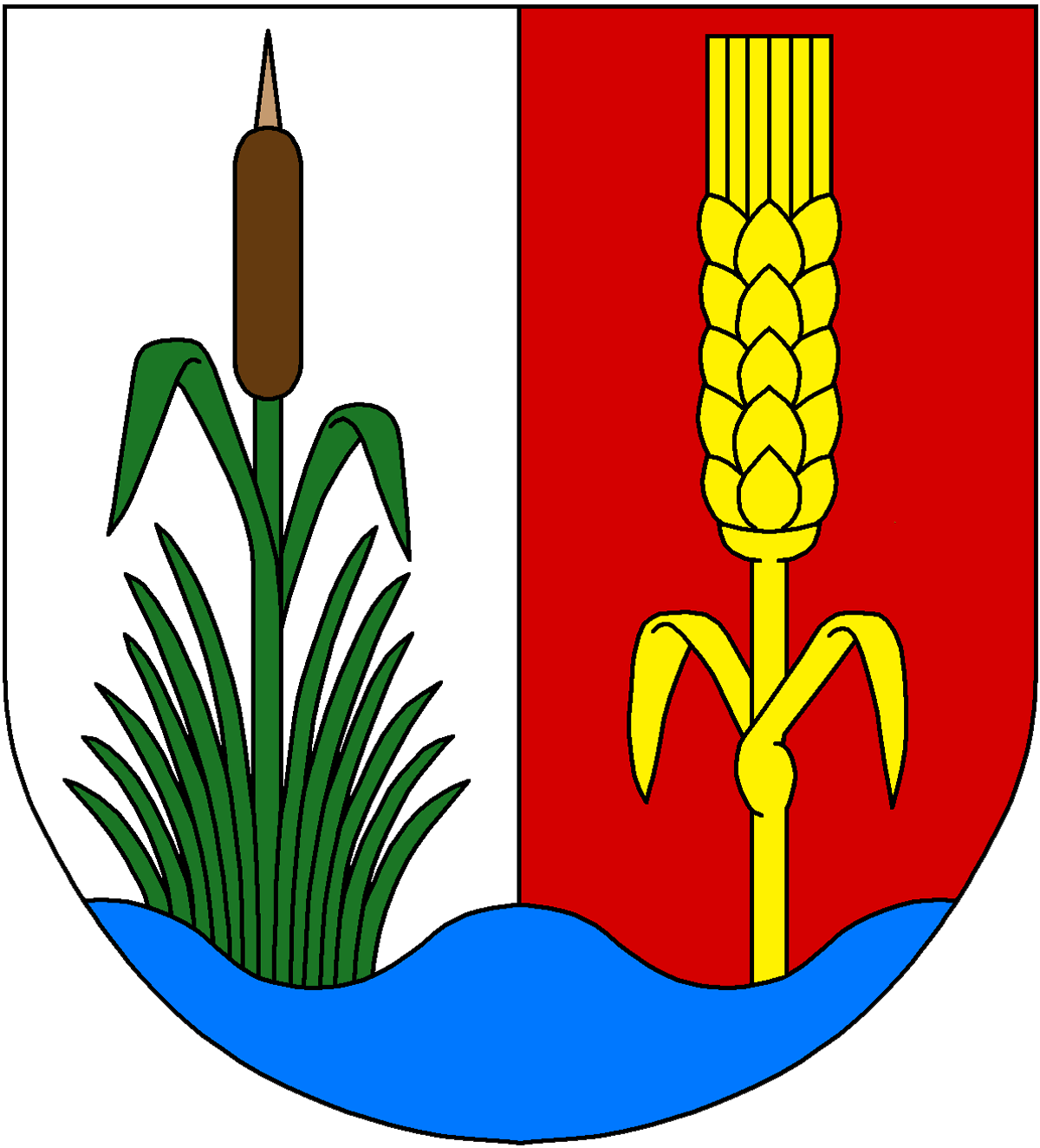
- Flag Coat of arms

- Location in the Czech Republic
- Coordinates: 50°5′31″N 15°44′46″E
- Country: Czech Republic
- Region: Pardubice
- District: Pardubice
- First mentioned: 1385

Area
  - Total: 7.84 km^{2} (3.03 sq mi)
- Elevation: 223 m (732 ft)

Population (2026-01-01)
  - Total: 309
  - Density: 39.4/km^{2} (102/sq mi)
- Time zone: UTC+1 (CET)
  - Summer (DST): UTC+2 (CEST)
- Postal code: 533 45
- Website: www.steblova.cz

Stéblová is a municipality and village in Pardubice District in the Pardubice Region of the Czech Republic. It has about 300 inhabitants.

== History ==
The first written mention of Stéblová is from 1385.

In 1960, Stéblová was the site of the Stéblová train disaster, the largest railway accident in the area of today's Czech Republic with 118 deaths.

== Demographics ==
Historical population
Year	Pop.	±%
1869	162	—
1880	182	+12.3%
1890	253	+39.0%
1900	235	−7.1%
1910	219	−6.8%
1921	244	+11.4%
1930	222	−9.0%
1950	181	−18.5%
1961	180	−0.6%
1970	160	−11.1%
1980	134	−16.2%
1991	148	+10.4%
2001	160	+8.1%
2011	224	+40.0%
2021	282	+25.9%
Source: Censuses
