= Šakvice =

- Municipality
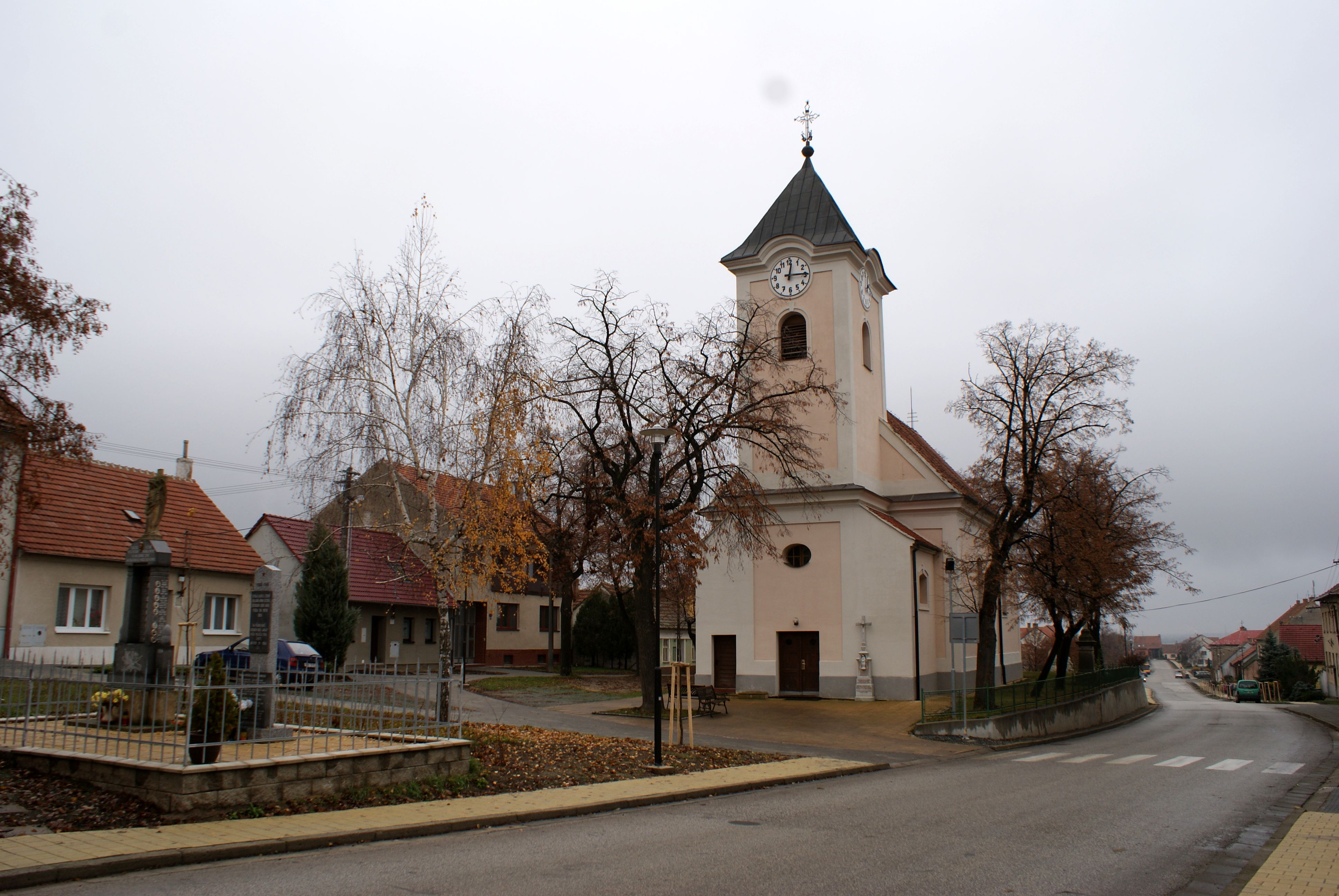
- Church of Saint Barbara

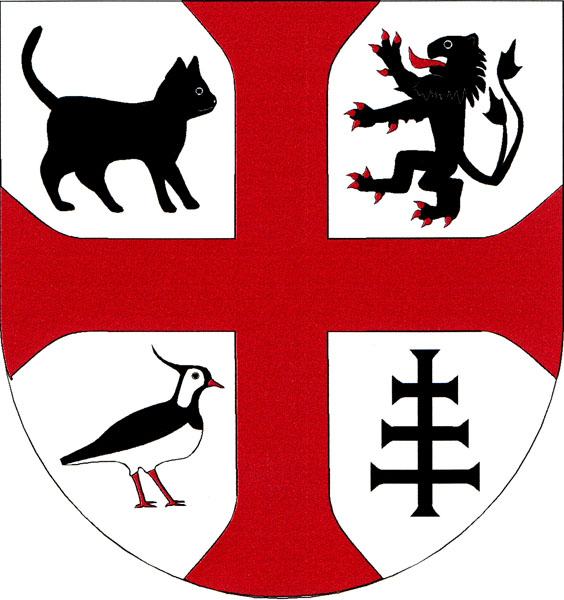
- Flag Coat of arms

- Location in the Czech Republic
- Coordinates: 48°53′51″N 16°42′51″E
- Country: Czech Republic
- Region: South Moravian
- District: Břeclav
- First mentioned: 1248

Area
  - Total: 11.96 km^{2} (4.62 sq mi)
- Elevation: 187 m (614 ft)

Population (2026-01-01)
  - Total: 1,595
  - Density: 133.4/km^{2} (345.4/sq mi)
- Time zone: UTC+1 (CET)
  - Summer (DST): UTC+2 (CEST)
- Postal code: 691 67
- Website: www.sakvice.cz

Šakvice (German: Schakwitz) is a municipality and village in Břeclav District in the South Moravian Region of the Czech Republic. It has about 1,600 inhabitants.

Šakvice lies approximately 20 kilometres (12 mi) north-west of Břeclav, 35 km (22 mi) south of Brno, and 213 km (132 mi) south-east of Prague.

== History ==
The first written mention of Šakvice is from 1248.

Šakvice train collision took place here in 1953.

== Demographics ==
Historical population
Year	Pop.	±%
1869	944	—
1880	1,137	+20.4%
1890	1,188	+4.5%
1900	1,154	−2.9%
1910	1,159	+0.4%
1921	1,325	+14.3%
1930	1,512	+14.1%
1950	1,360	−10.1%
1961	1,471	+8.2%
1970	1,605	+9.1%
1980	1,573	−2.0%
1991	1,441	−8.4%
2001	1,391	−3.5%
2011	1,380	−0.8%
2021	1,483	+7.5%
Source: Censuses
