= Pardubice train collision =

2024 train collision in the Czech Republic

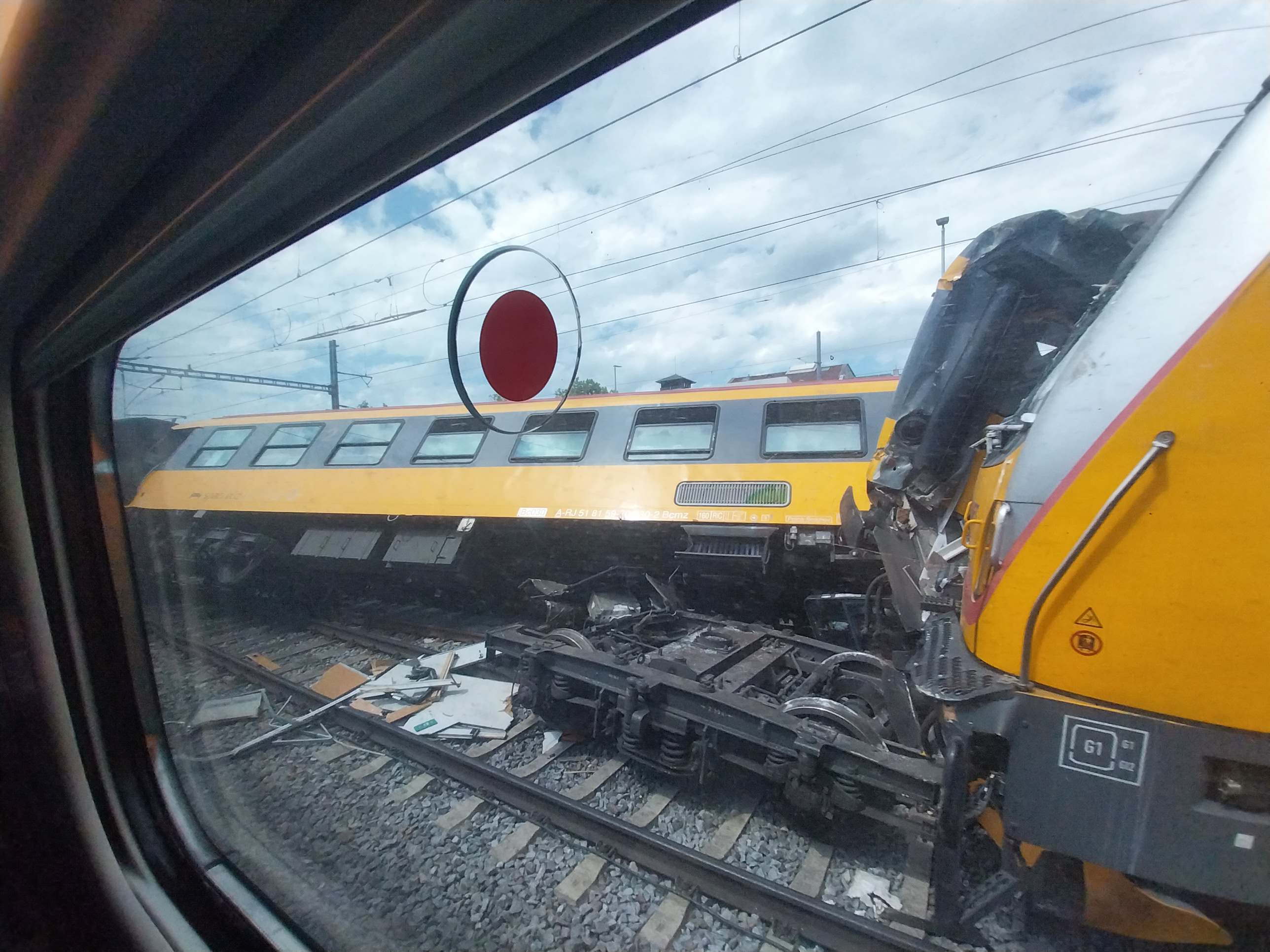
- Damaged first coach of RegioJet, a day after the collision

Details
- Date: 5 June 2024; 22:49 CEST
- Location: Pardubice, Pardubice Region
- Country: Czech Republic
- Line: Prague–Česká Třebová railway
- Operator: RegioJet; ČD Cargo
- Incident type: Head-on collision
- Cause: under investigation

Statistics
- Passengers: 300+
- Deaths: 4
- Injured: 22

On 5 June 2024, at 10:49 p.m., a train collision in Pardubice, Czech Republic occurred in the vicinity of Pardubice main railway station, near the Pardubice centrum station. Express train number RJ 1021 of the RegioJet company heading from Prague to Košice (3 cars should continue as RJ 1222 to Chop) collided with freight express train number Nex 41340 of the railway operator ČD Cargo. Subsequently, both trains derailed and as a result of the crash, four people died and another 22 were injured.

Over 300 people were traveling in the express train. The freight train was carrying calcium carbide, but the first two cars were empty.

== Background ==
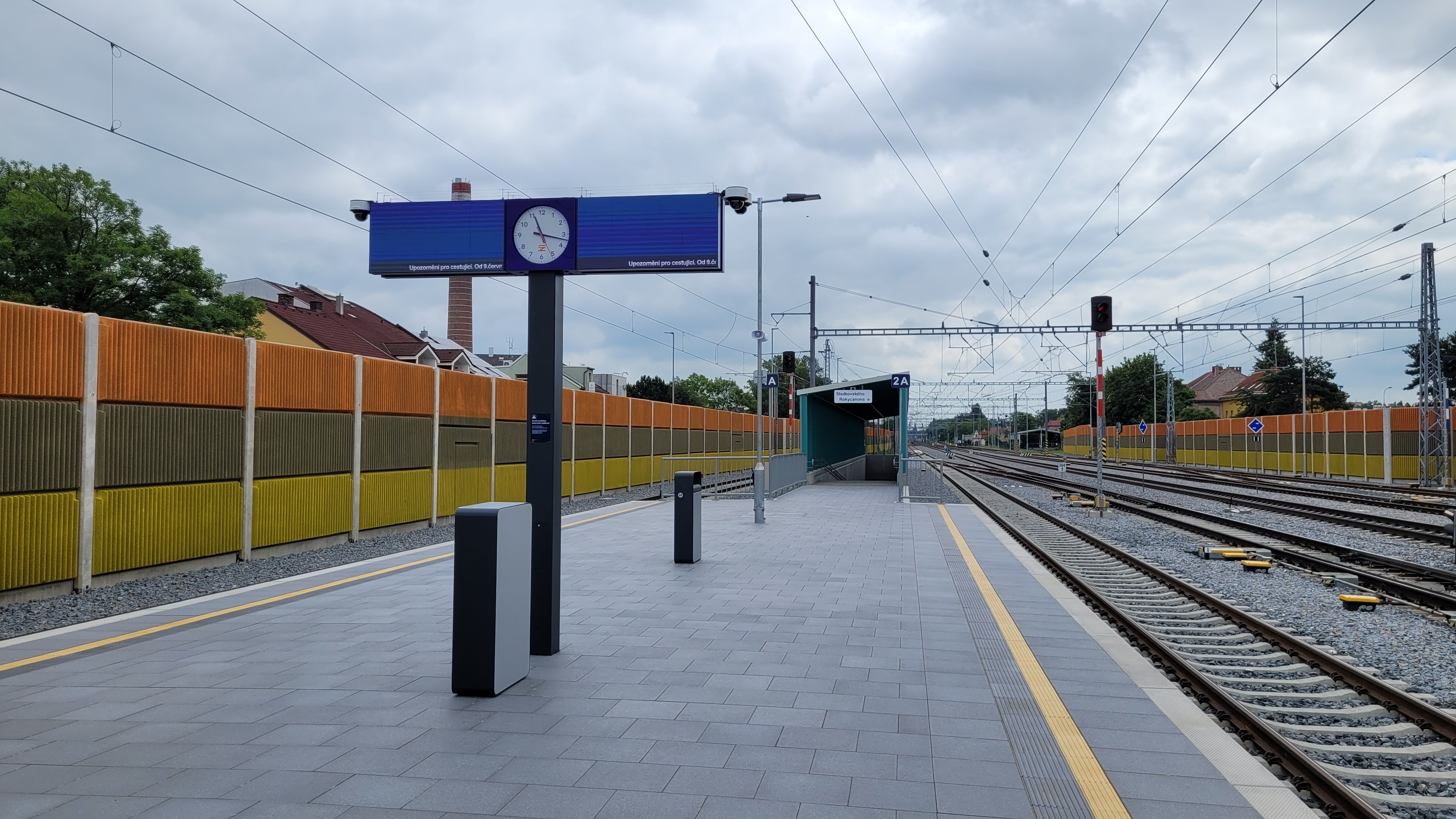
Pardubice centrum station pictured a day before the crash occurred, viewed towards the collision site

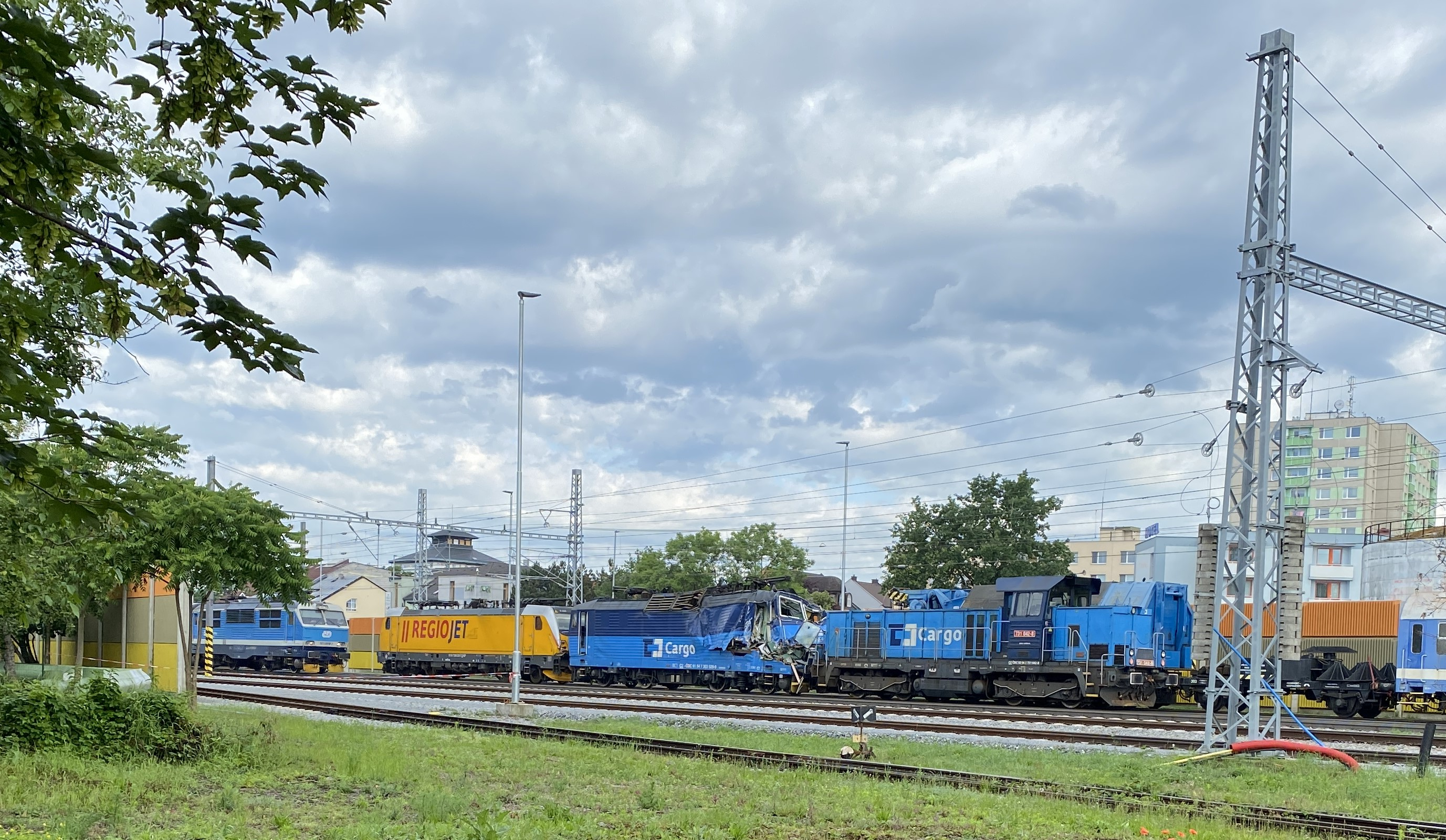
Damaged locomotives 363.529 of ČD Cargo and 388.205 of RegioJet (locomotive of another train passing on the left)

Pardubice is situated on one of the most important railway corridors in the Czech Republic, specifically on the Prague to Česká Třebová, and as such is used by trains heading towards Ostrava, Brno, Vienna, Budapest, Košice and Warsaw (eastbound) and towards Prague, Plzeň and Dresden (westbound), among many others. Starting from 2021, the station underwent a major reconstruction program, the largest of its kind in over 60 years, which involved adding European Train Control System (ETCS), track remodelling works and the replacement of all adjacent infrastructure. By 2024 most of the works were finished but the ETCS system was not planned to be turned on until January 2025, and the previous MIREL safety system had also been turned off; therefore according to Czech railway regulations, drivers had to follow the signal aspects and travel at no faster than 100 km/h.

The first train was RJ 1021 from Praha hlavní nádraží to Košice, with three through cars to Chop, Ukraine. The train was exclusively made up of couchette cars and regular first and second class cars. On the night of the crash, it was pulled by a Bombardier Traxx MS3 locomotive. The freight train (number Nex 41340) was pulled by a ČD Class 363.5 locomotive, number 363 529-9 followed by several flat wagons with containers.

== Reactions ==
Transport Minister Martin Kupka and Interior Minister Vít Rakušan visited the scene of the crash. Prime Minister Petr Fiala described the collision as a great tragedy and expressed his condolences to the families of the victims.
