= Stéblová train disaster =

1960 railway accident in Czechoslovakia

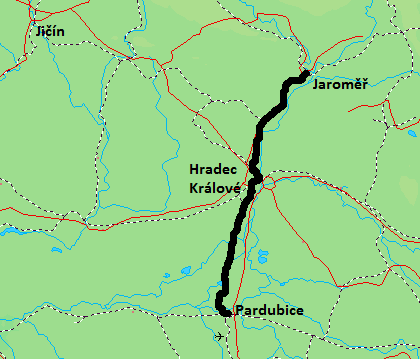

Details
- Date: November 14, 1960; 65 years ago
- Location: Stéblová
- Coordinates: 50°05′21″N 15°45′03″E
- Country: Czechoslovakia
- Operator: Czechoslovak State Railways
- Incident type: Collision

Statistics
- Trains: 2
- Deaths: 118
- Injured: 110
Route map
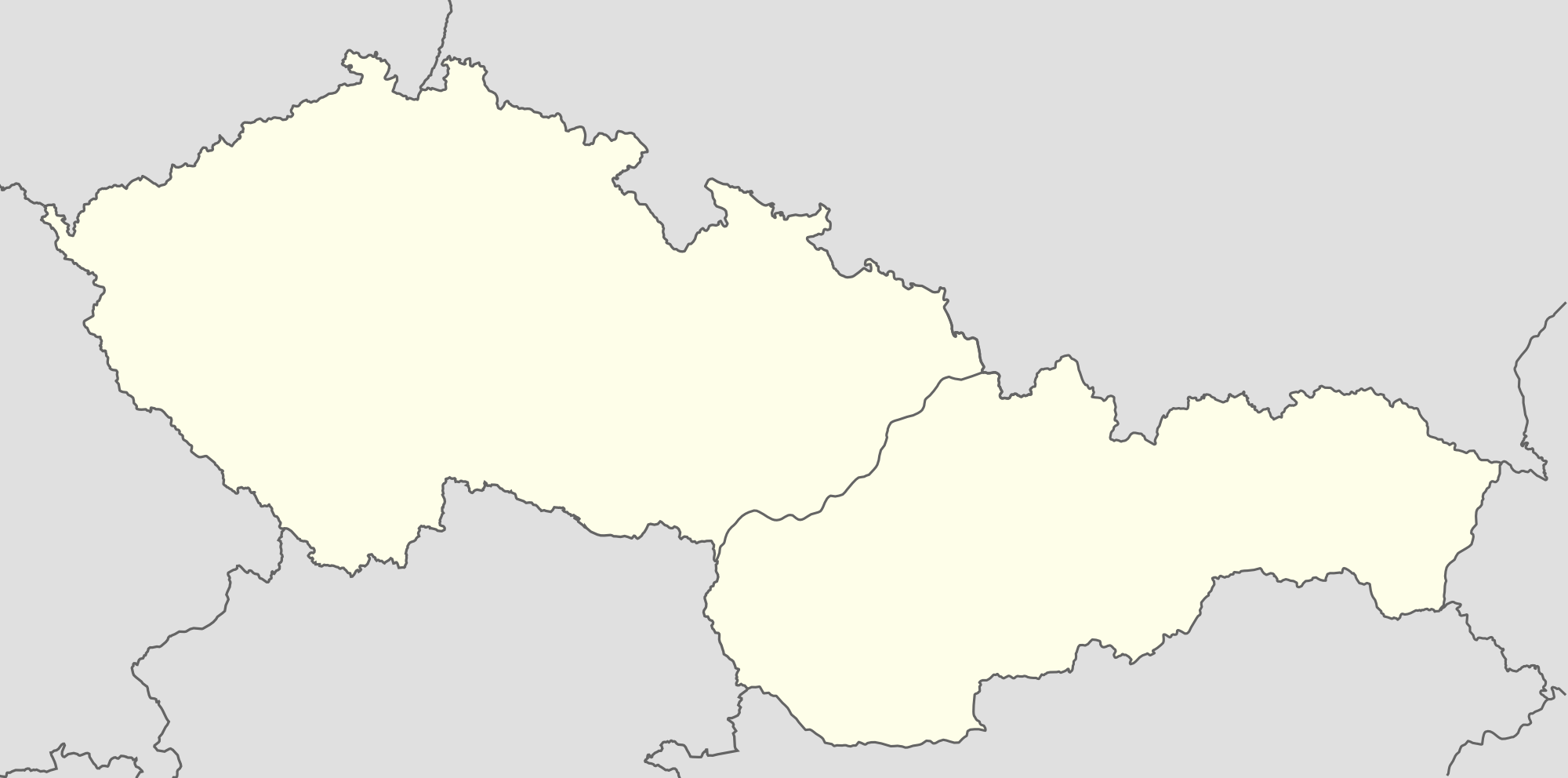
Accident location in Czechoslovakia

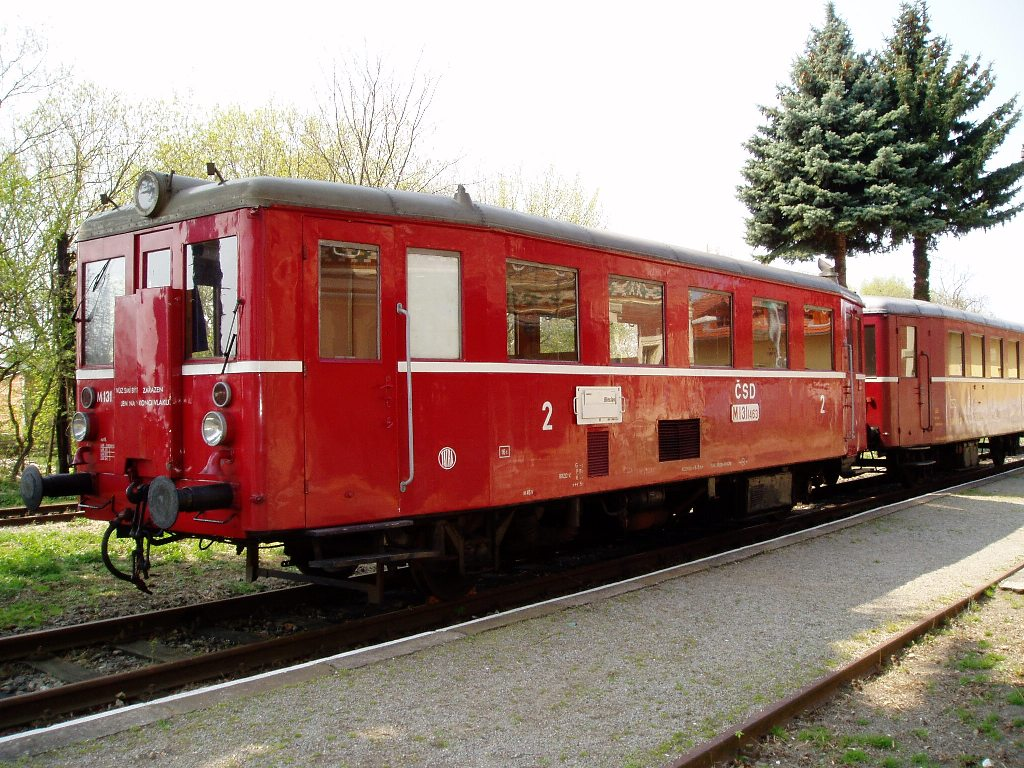
Diesel railcar class M 131.1

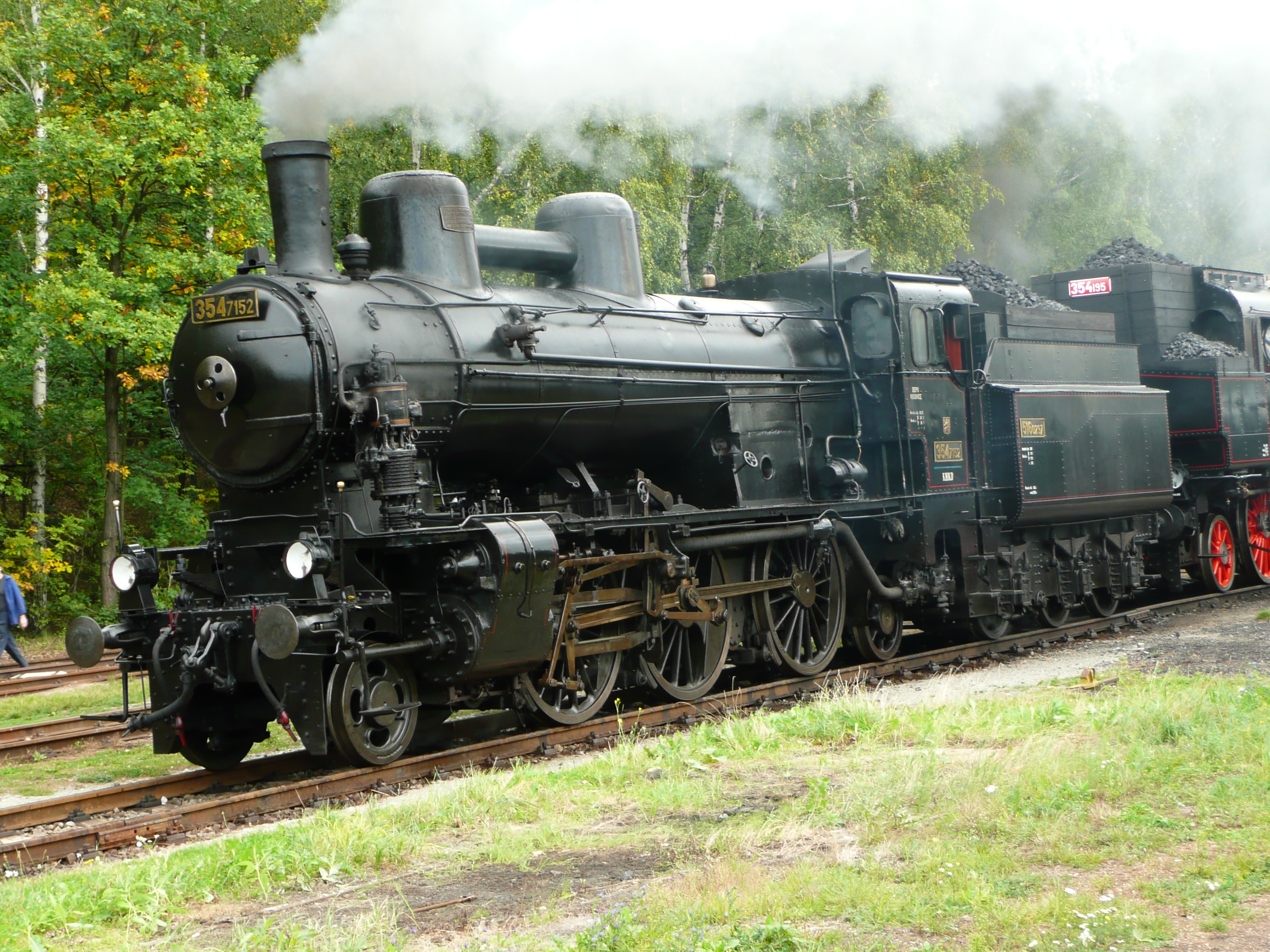
Steam locomotive class 354.7

The Stéblová train disaster was a railway accident that occurred on 14 November 1960 at 17:42 CET on a single-track railway in Stéblová in Czechoslovakia (now the Czech Republic). At 17:42 CET, a passenger steam train 608 traveling at a speed of 55 km/h collided with a diesel railcar 653 traveling at a speed of 60 km/h. 118 people died as a result of the accident and 110 were badly injured. It remains the deadliest accident in the history of Czech railway transport.

== Trains ==
Train 608 travelled from Liberec via Hradec Králové to Pardubice. It was hauled by the steam locomotive type 354.7128 from the Hradec Králové engine house and operated by the train driver and an assistant/fireman. Behind the locomotive were post car type F 9-2236, freight car type Ztr 1-36700, personal car Bi 3-3323, service car Dd 7-2286 and eight further personal cars. The train crew was composed of a head guard, a senior conductor, a junior conductor, and a train attendant.

Train 653 traveled from Pardubice to Hradec Králové at a distance of 22 kilometers. It was composed of the diesel railcar M 131.1272, four personal cars (Blm 5-2338, Blm 5-2333, BDlm 6-6890, BDlm 6-6899) and another diesel railcar M 131.1327 at the train's rear end. Its crew was composed of two train drivers accompanied by the head guard and conductor.

According to the railway schedule, the two trains should have passed in their respective directions in Stéblová station, which has three tracks. At that time, the station was secured by mechanical equipment with central interlock and mechanical signals in both directions.

== Accident history ==
=== Events before the disaster ===
Train 653 left Pardubice at 17:22, one minute behind schedule. Train 608 left Hradec Králové at 17:25, seven minutes behind schedule. The Stéblová station dispatcher set the path for train 608 to track number 1 and assigned train 653 to track number 2; this was the reverse of what was usually done. Train 608 arrived at Stéblová station at 17:40. The station dispatcher left the office, but returned after a while to set the track for train 653. The switchman went away to operate switch number 4 to set up for the future departure of train 653, and also to lift the crossing-gates after train 608 passed through. Meanwhile, the station dispatcher confirmed by telephone with Čeperka (the station from which train 608 had arrived) that the track was clear, and then set the route for train 653's arrival.

What happened next was never clearly explained. The weather was very foggy, with visibility limited to 50 meters. Train 608's senior conductor and junior conductors both got down from the train. The senior conductor supposedly saw a green light close to the station office, which would have meant "permission to depart". He informed the junior conductor that he had seen the signal and shouted "Get on board, [station dispatcher] gives departure"; he asserted later that he saw only a flash of green light. Because of the fog, he was not able to identify the source of the light. It could not have been the station dispatcher, as he was in his office at the time. Though the junior conductor personally did not see the green light, he passed the signal to the locomotive. The head guard likewise accepted the green light's sighting without having seen it himself. Some passengers later stated that they also might have seen such a light, but were not absolutely sure.

The source of the green light (if it existed at all) was never determined. The most likely possibility would have been a junior conductor's lantern, as these were equipped with filters in multiple colors, including green.

Train 608's driver (although he did not see the green light) called "departure" and started the train. At the very moment the train was passing the signal, the fireman was putting coal into the firebox and discovered the water level was low, so he did not notice that the signal was actually in the "stop" position, even though checking the signals was part of his duty. Moreover, the head guard likewise overlooked that "stop" signal. Indeed, as he later mentioned, he remembered that train 608 normally passed train 653 at Stéblová station, but he assumed the passing had been moved to the next station.

When the station dispatcher saw that train 608 had started to move, he rushed out of his office and used a lantern and two whistles to signal "stop by any possible means". The duty of the senior conductor during departure was to observe signals coming from the station, but he had already begun to check tickets. One of the switchmen jumped on a bicycle and unsuccessfully attempted to catch up with the train. The station dispatcher tried to call a signal box two kilometers away to ask the staff there to stop train 653. However, the signalman had left the box to watch for train 653's arrival and only picked up the phone after the train had passed. Meanwhile, the switchman from the signal box in Stéblová informed the station dispatcher that train 608 had just passed him, leaving the station area.

=== Collision ===
The collision between trains 608 and 653 happened on kilometer 8.055 at 17:42 (some sources say at 17:44). The speed of the steam train 608 was about 55 km/h, train 653 about 60 km/h. Both drivers braked, but it was too late.

Train 608's driver and fireman survived almost unhurt because the locomotive's construction, especially its long boiler, saved them. Its first (mail) car was seriously damaged and derailed. The following (freight) car collided with and demolished the mail car in front of it. The third (first passenger) car was almost totally demolished by the fourth (service) car. The fifth car ran up on the fourth from behind. The remaining seven cars sustained little or no damage.

Train 653 incurred much worse damage. Its first railcar landed atop the forward part of train 608's steam locomotive. The first passenger car crashed into the locomotive's side, and the following three passenger cars collided with it and were totally crushed. The rearmost railcar's coupling broke, leaving it standing on the track.

In order to prevent a boiler explosion, the steam engine's driver and fireman dumped their firebox on the ground. The hot coals and ashes ignited diesel fuel leaking from 653's first railcar, and the train burst into flames.

=== Rescue operation ===
The rescue operation started at around 18:00, with the help of medical teams from Pardubice and Hradec Králové, members of police (then called Public Security), soldiers from the nearby military school and local citizens. The field first aid post was set up, ambulances transported the injured to hospitals in Pardubice and Hradec Králové and the operations were run even in maternity homes. Special trains equipped with cranes were sent to the disaster site to deal with the wreckage.

Most survivors were rescued before 20:00. The last survivor was found under the wreckage at around 23:00, but died during transportation. The trains' wreckage and accompanying debris were removed the next day, 15 November 1960, by around 11:30. At 12:30 the first scheduled train went through. During the cleanup, five fast, 21-passenger, and 21 freight trains were cancelled.

The count of victims totalled 118 dead and 110 seriously injured (according to some sources, 110 and 106 respectively). It was impossible to identify some of the deceased and three bodies were never found. The total damage was estimated at around 477,000 Kčs (Czechoslovak crowns – country average monthly income was 1,303 Kčs in 1960).

== Aftermath ==
=== Court trial ===
Investigation of the disaster commenced the night of its occurrence. The government created an investigation commission, which published its final report on 30 November 1960. In general, it was a flagrant violation of elementary railway transportation rules. Judicial trials were held at the Regional Court in Hradec Králové from 8 to 11 February 1961. Train 608's crew members received sentences as follows:

- train head – 5.5 years imprisonment
- train driver – 4.5 years imprisonment (released after 3 years)
- senior conductor – 4 years imprisonment
- assistant/fireman – 1.5 years imprisonment
- junior conductor – 1-year suspended
- train attendant – acquitted

All those convicted were moreover banned from the profession for several years.

=== Publicity ===
The official bulletin on the accident was issued on 15 November 1960 by Czechoslovak Press Agency, which was printed by the Rudé Právo (Communist Party of the Czechoslovakia central newspaper) the next day. The bulletin published the number of victims, mentioned politicians who visited the disaster place and announced the creation of a government investigation commission. The commission's published report of 30 November 1960 was subsequently published in Rudé Právo on 14 February 1961, along with information about the trial proceedings which had concluded the previous day.

=== Memorial ===
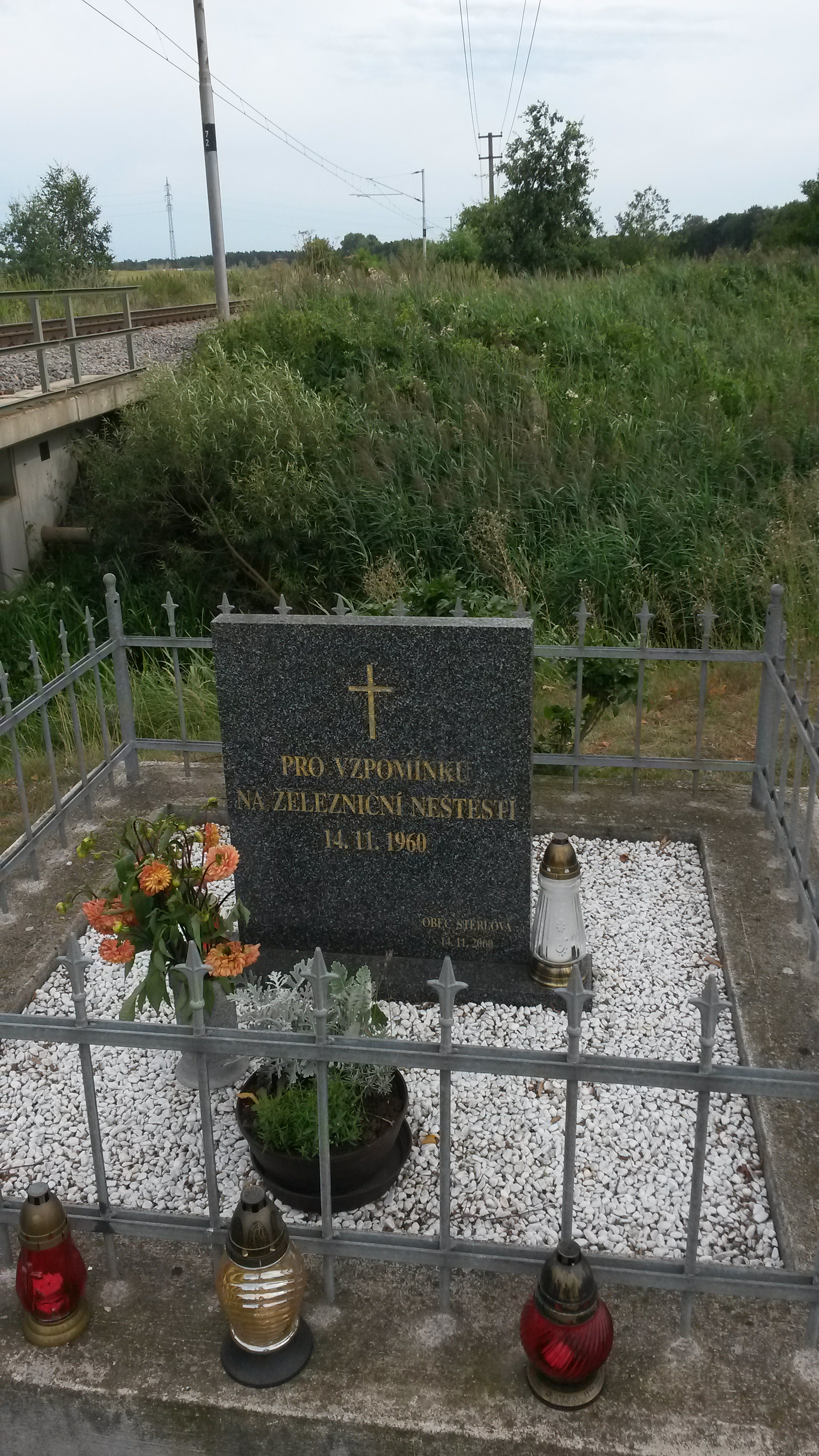

A cross was erected at the place of disaster; it was replaced about 80 meters away in 1967 and enclosed by a low grille fence.

On the occasion of the 40th anniversary of the disaster in 2000, a memorial ceremony was held in which the municipal office in Stéblová replaced the cross (at that time considerably dilapidated and rusty) with a black granite plaque with an appropriate inscription, inserted into the modified area.

== See also ==
- 2015 Studénka train crash
- Milavče train crash
- 2025 Hustopeče nad Bečvou train crash
