= 2015 Studénka train crash =

Collision in the Czech Republic

Coordinates: 49.7083°N 18.0709°E

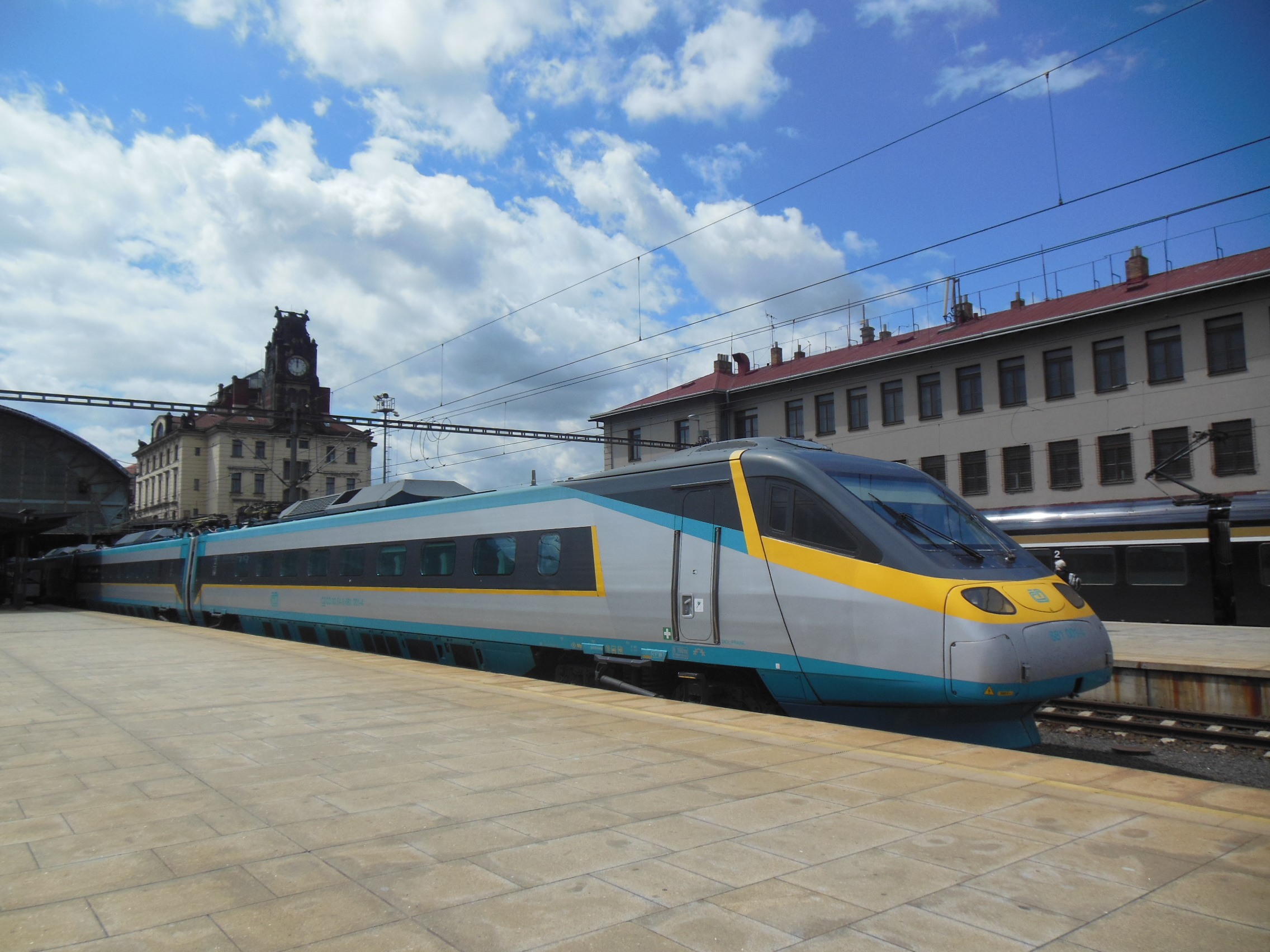
- A ČD Class 680 Pendolino, the train involved in the accident.

Details
- Date: July 22, 2015; 07:43 CEST (UTC+02:00)
- Location: Studénka, Czech Republic
- Country: Czech Republic
- Operator: Czech Railways
- Cause: Collision with a truck

Statistics
- Trains: 1
- Passengers: 145
- Deaths: 3
- Injured: 17
- Damage: 157.7 million CZK

On 22 July 2015 at 7:43 a.m., a passenger train on its way from Bohumín to Františkovy Lázně collided with a truck on a rail crossing in Studénka, Czech Republic. Three passengers died and seventeen others were injured. It was the deadliest train disaster in the Czech Republic since 2008, when a road bridge under construction collapsed just in front of an approaching train on the same track, two kilometres ahead of the 2015 crash site.

== Incident ==
On 22 July 2015, a truck driver of Polish nationality was driving from Poland to Hungary with a load of aluminium plates. The driver chose a time-consuming route on local roads to save money on highway tolls. The driver drove through a rail crossing near the Studénka train station, despite the crossing being already protected by warning signals and gates. As the gates went down, the driver stopped the truck on the tracks. Instead of ramming through the gate, which is constructed to allow even a motorbike to penetrate the barrier and automatically sends a stop signal to all approaching trains if breached, the driver moved the truck only a few metres forward to avoid a direct impact to its cab, with its trailer carrying aluminium sheets remaining on the track. After a few seconds, train SC 512 Pendolino emerged from the curve leading to the crossing at 160 km/h (99 mph).

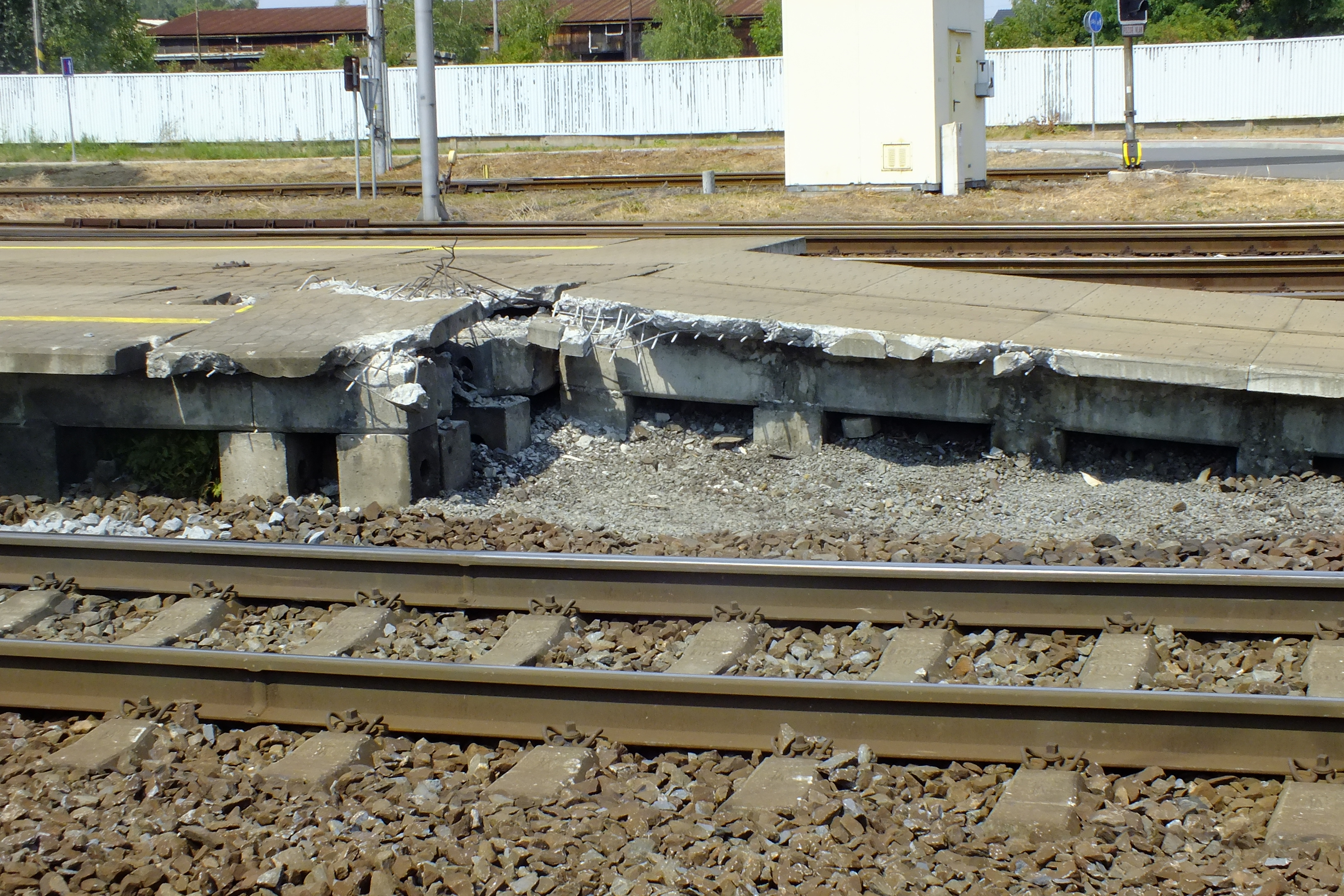
Aftermath of the train crash

The train driver pulled the emergency brake, managing to slow the train to 142 km/h (88 mph) at the moment of impact. The train came to a halt halfway along the Studénka railway station, about 500 metres (1,600 ft) from the point of impact, pushing ahead and completely destroying the truck's chassis and trailer, while the truck's cab was chopped off and fell on the ground as a whole with minimum damage. The trailer, as it was pushed by the train, inflicted major damage to the station platform, with projectile debris injuring six people at the station. The entire incident was captured by the crossing's security camera.

Two passengers sitting in the front carriage were killed instantly, while the train driver lost his leg and sustained further serious injuries, including to his spine, as more than three tons of metal sheets smashed through the driver's cabin and into the passenger compartment. Another 12 people were injured inside the train, one of them fatally.

== Aftermath ==
The truck driver, completely unharmed in the crash, was detained by Czech police. He was charged with public endangerment, which carries a penalty of five to 10 years' imprisonment, and ordered into pre-trial custody by the court.

In February 2016 the County Court in Nový Jičín sentenced the driver to 8½ years in prison and banned him from driving on Czech territory until 2026.

== See also ==
- 2025 Hustopeče nad Bečvou train crash

== See also ==
- List of level crossing crashes
