= List of rail accidents (1950–1959) =

This is a list of rail accidents from 1950 to 1959.

== 1950 ==
- January 29 – India – At Sirhind, a goods train and a mail train collide, killing 63 people, about half of them soldiers.
- February 17 – United States – Rockville Centre train crash, Rockville Centre, New York: Two passenger trains collide head-on at Rockville Centre station. The engineer of train number 192 ignored an Approach and the following Stop signals and collided with train number 175 on temporary gantleted (overlapping) track which had been installed to facilitate a grade separation project. Both engineers survived but 31 people were killed, and more than 100 people injured.
- February 26 – United States – A Lehigh Valley Railroad freight train is derailed at Mehoopany, Pennsylvania, destroying the railway station there.
- March 7 – United Kingdom – An overnight express passenger train overruns danger signals in fog and collides with the rear of a mineral train 2 3/4 miles (4.4 km) south west of Kelvedon, Essex; and 3/4 mile (1.2 km) northeast of Witham Junction. The passenger fireman and goods guard were killed.
- April 6 – Brazil – At Tanguá on the Leopoldina Railway, flooding of the Rio Tanguá in heavy rain causes a bridge to collapse under a train going from Rio de Janeiro to Vitória. The locomotive and several cars fall into the river; 90 people swim to safety, but 110 are killed and over 300 injured.
- June 5 – United Kingdom – The Flying Scotsman train derails at Tollerton, Nottinghamshire due to heat-buckled track.
- June 8 – United Kingdom – A fire on a train at Beattock, Dumfriesshire kills five people.
- July 12 – East Germany – A workers' train collides with a stationary freight between Zwickau and Aue, killing 20 people and injuring at least 50.
- August 27 – United Kingdom – An express passenger train collides with a light engine at Penmaenmawr, Caernarfonshire due to a signalman's error. Five people are killed in the first major accident for British Railways.
- September 2 – United States – Milwaukee, Wisconsin: Two Milwaukee Electric Railway and Light Company trains chartered by the National Model Railroad Association collided head on killing 10 and injuring 47. Poor visibility and a lack of formal dispatching practices were to blame.
- September 3 – India – On the Pathankot-to-Amritsar line of the Eastern Punjab Railway, the Kashmir Mail train to Delhi is derailed near Gurdaspur due to an "error of judgment" by railway staff. The locomotive and 3 cars fall down an embankment and 12 people are killed.
- September 6 – Brazil – At Pantojo on the Sorocabana line, a derailment kills 36.
- September 11 – United States – Coshocton, Ohio: The Pennsylvania Railroad's train number 31, the westbound Spirit of St. Louis ignores the warning Approach signal [maximum speed 30 mph (48 km/h), next signal at red] and, traveling at 48 mph (77 km/h) in dense fog, rear-ends a stopped troop train carrying the 109th Infantry Regiment from Wilkes-Barre, Pennsylvania, killing 33. The engineer of the Spirit of St. Louis is to blame.
- October 23 – United Kingdom – A passenger train is derailed at Drumburgh Moss, Cumberland due to defective track and the failure to implement a speed restriction. Three people are injured.
- November 15 – Norway – Hjuksebø train collision: Seven freight cars run away from the train to which they should have been attached and collide with a passenger train, killing 14 people.
- November 21 – Canada – Canoe River train crash: A westbound Canadian National Railway train carrying Korea-bound troops is given incorrectly copied orders and collides with eastbound passenger train number 2, killing 21 people – the enginemen of both trains and 17 soldiers.
- November 22 – United States – Kew Gardens train crash: A collision between two Long Island Rail Road commuter trains near Kew Gardens Station killed 79 people and injured 352, making it the worst passenger railroad accident of both LIRR and New York history.

== 1951 ==
- February 6 – United States – Woodbridge train derailment, New Jersey: The Broker, a Pennsylvania Railroad passenger train derails, killing 85 people and injuring more than 500.
- February 9 – Canada – Coniston, Sudbury, Ontario, ice fog from −44 °C temperatures led to a crash between a Canadian Pacific Railway passenger train and a Nickel Belt Coach Lines bus at a level crossing. The bus was carrying workers home from the nearby International Nickel Company. Nine people died as a result.
- March 16 – United Kingdom – Doncaster rail crash. A driver was in the habit of exceeding a certain crossover's 10 mph (16 km/h) speed limit, but a track defect derailed the train and it crashed into an overbridge; 14 people died.
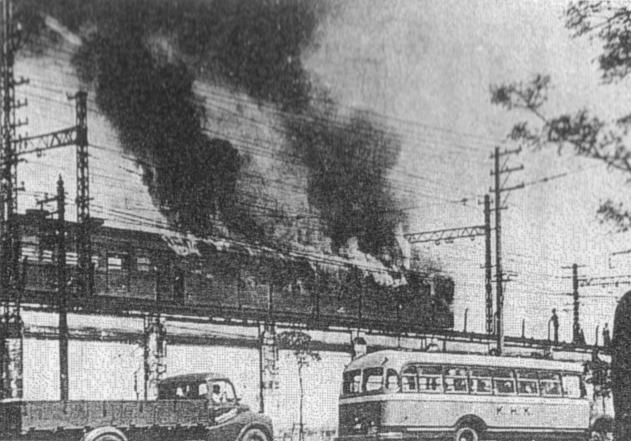
- The burning train, Sakuragichō, Japan, 24 April 1951
  April 24 – Japan – Sakuragichō train fire, A commuter train's pantograph catches fire on the approach to Sakuragichō Station, Yokohama, killing at least 106 people and injuring 93.
- June 7 – Brazil – Nova Iguaçu level crossing disaster, A commuter train collides with a truck carrying gasoline at a level crossing at Nova Iguaçu, northwestern Rio de Janeiro, killing at least 54 people.
- July 22 – Czechoslovakia – Tatranská Lomnica: In the Slovak Tatra Mountains, two ČSD passenger cars collide. 19 people are killed. A similar crash had occurred in 1895 at the same place.
- August 5 – United Kingdom – An electric multiple unit overruns signals and collides with another at Ford, West Sussex. Eight people are killed and 47 seriously injured.
- August 10 - United States - A troop train collided with a "Streamliner" near Lettsworth, Louisiana. Eight US Marines are killed.
- August 17 – United Kingdom – Two electric multiple units collide at Newcastle Central after one of them overruns signals. Three people are killed.
- August 18 – Hungary – Székesfehérvár: Two passenger trains collide due to an error by an inexperienced signal operator; six people are killed (one in the hospital). .
- August 24 – France – At Sanry-sur-Nied, a Frankfurt to Paris express is stopped by signals. The conductor tries to go back and put down detonators, but before he has gone 250 m (820 ft), a Basel-to-Calais express arrives at 100 km/h (60 mph) and crashes into the first train, one car of which ends up on the roof of another. Altogether 23 people are killed and 40 wounded, many of them French or American soldiers. The signalman is blamed.
- September 21 – United Kingdom – Weedon rail crash: Defective maintenance on locomotive bogie causing derailment which killed 15.
- September 25 – Austria – At Langenwang station on the Semmering Pass line, the supervisor decides to take advantage of the fact that a Vienna-to-Rome express is running late by allowing the shunting of a freight train to proceed, blocking the express's path. When informed that the express is reaching Mürzzuschlag, in the hope of not delaying it he prematurely clears signals so it can approach the shunting train closer than the usual safety margin, and tries to hurry the shunting driver along. The trains collide, killing 22 people and injuring 50, 11 seriously. All of the fatalities are among a party of Italian railwaymen and their families, who had been visiting Vienna by invitation of the Austrian railways.
- October 5 – Colombia – Near the town of Montenegro, on the line from Armenia to Pereira, a passenger train is struck by a landslide, possibly triggered by the train's own vibration; 26 are killed.
- November 12 – United States – At Evanston, Wyoming, on the Union Pacific Railroad, a rear-end collision of the trains City of Los Angeles and City of San Francisco kills 17 people, or kills 26 people and injures 200. Tony Ippolito died in the wreck.
- November 25 – United States – A head-on collision on the Southern Railway kills 17 people.
- December 17 – Brazil – Piquet Carneiro train crash: A derailment due to excess speed at Piquet Carneiro kills 53.

== 1952 ==
- March 4 – Brazil – Anchieta rail disaster near Rio de Janeiro kills 119 people when a high-speed electric freight train collides with a derailed passenger train.
- April 21 – United Kingdom – A Thames-Clyde Express passenger train is derailed at Blea Moor, Lancashire due to a faulty locomotive causing points to open under the train.
- May 7 – Australia – A fully laden passenger train collides in dense fog with a stationary train at Berala railway station. Ten people are killed and 137 injured.
- May 18 – India – Passenger and freight trains are erroneously allowed to enter the same section 7 miles (11 km) from Bikaner in the direction toward Jodhpur. They collide, killing 45 and injuring 67.
- May 18(?) – Turkey – The derailment of a mixed train between Ulukışla and Adana kills 26 people.
- July 9 – Poland – Rzepin train disaster: A fast Pt47 steam locomotive allegedly derailed in Rzepin. 160 people died.
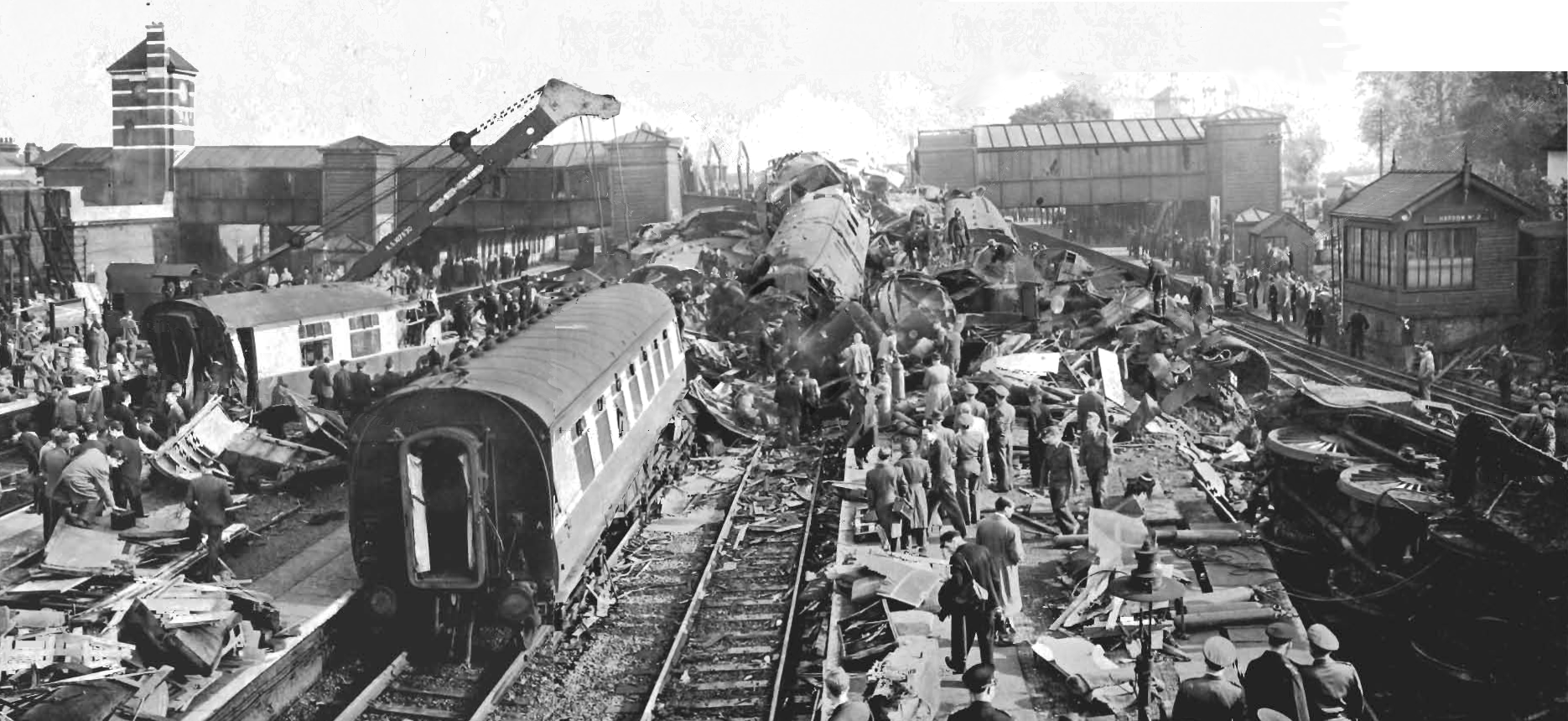
- Harrow and Wealdstone rail crash
  October 8 – United Kingdom – Harrow and Wealdstone rail crash: Three trains are involved in a crash that kills 112 people and injures 340. A rear-end collision due to a driver passing a signal at danger in fog is immediately followed by another express running into the wreckage.
- October 15 – British Nigeria – A breakdown crane on the way to a goods train derailment comes uncoupled from its locomotive, rolls downhill 3 miles (4.8 km) backwards, and crashes into a passenger train 21 miles (34 km) south of Ibadan, killing at least 34 people. A young survivor runs for help 4.8 km (3 miles) to the nearest road, where he happens upon the district officer and his senior medical officer; but rescue is hampered as there is no other crane nearer than Enugu.
- October 20 – South Africa – The locomotive and 10 cars of the night mail train from Durban to Johannesburg derail on a curve at Heavitree, 10 miles (16 km) past Estcourt, killing 21 people and injuring about 50.
- November 8 – United Kingdom – An electric multiple unit suffers a brake malfunction, overruns signals and collides with a steam locomotive at Guildford, Surrey. Two people are killed and 37 are injured.

== 1953 ==
- January 15 – United States – 1953 Pennsylvania Railroad train wreck: Approaching Union Station in Washington, D.C., the brakes partially fail on the Pennsylvania Railroad Federal Express overnight train from Boston. The 16-car train smashes through the bumper into the station, where the heavy electric locomotive breaks through the floor. There are 43 people injured but nobody is killed. The locomotive is left in place under a temporarily repaired floor until after Dwight D. Eisenhower's January 20 inauguration as president.
- January 17 – United States – An Atlantic Coast Line passenger train and a Southern Railway freight train collided in the small community of Fleming, Georgia. 2 people (the train's engineer and fireman) died and 85 others were injured. The cause of the crash, according to the Interstate Commerce Commission, was "excessive speed".
- February 15 – Italy – A train from Lecce to Naples and Rome derails in Benevento due to excessive speed; 23 are killed.
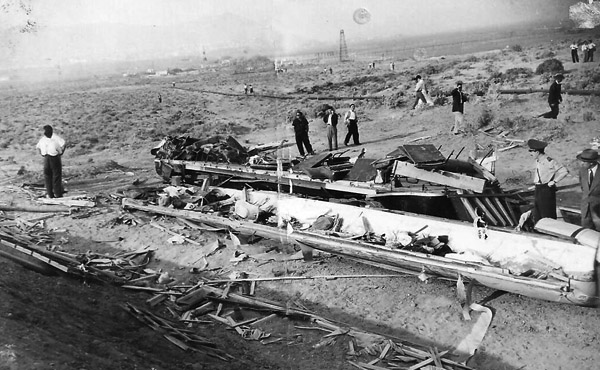
- Comodoro Rivadavia rail disaster (1953)
  February 15 – Argentina – Comodoro Rivadavia rail disaster (1953): At Comodoro Rivadavia, a railbus derails on an embankment and falls, killing 23 people and injuring 42.
- March 27 – United States – 1953 New York Central Railroad accident: Conneaut, Ohio: Three New York Central trains tangle near Conneaut on the four-track mainline on the night of March 27. Twenty-one people die. The cause is found to be an improperly secured gondola load—a section of 13-inch (330 mm) pipe fell from a freight car onto the adjacent track and was struck by a passenger train.
- April 8 – United Kingdom – Stratford tube crash: 12 people were killed as a result of a rear-end collision in a tunnel.
- April 27 – United States – Union Pacific Big Boy 4005 jumps at a switch track at 50 mph (80 km/h) and derails in southern Wyoming. The engineer and fireman were killed on impact, while the brakeman died from his injuries in a hospital a few days later.
- June 9 – United States – On the Chesapeake and Ohio Railway, 3 crew members were killed at Hinton, West Virginia, when the boiler of the Class H-8 articulated steam locomotive on their 125-car eastbound freight train exploded due to a low water level unconvering its crown sheet. The train was moving at 20 mph (32 km/h) on level track at the time; the boiler was thrown 440 ft (130 m) and the adjacent westbound track was shoved 5 ft 3 in (1.60 m) sideways.
- June 24 – French Indochina – Col des Nuages derailment: "About 100 or more" people are killed when a passenger train plunges 15 m (50 feet) through a sabotaged viaduct. Two locomotives and 18 cars crashed down in a ravine at Col des Nuages (now the Hai Van Pass) on the route between the ancient capital of Huế and the port of Tourane (Da Nang). The pass had frequently been the scene of attacks by the Communist-led Viet Minh rebels. Officials said that a strong charge exploded just as the train arrived at the viaduct, tumbling a 7.5 m (25-foot) span into the ravine.
- August 15 – United Kingdom – Irk Valley Junction rail crash, ten die when the front carriages of an electric train plunge off a viaduct following a collision.
- August 16 – United Kingdom – A passenger train derails at Kingsbury, Warwickshire due to a combination of locomotive faults and track faults.
- September 4 – United Kingdom – A passenger train derails at Bethnal Green, London when a set of points move under it. The cause is found to be an error by a signalling technician causing a false feed to the point motor.
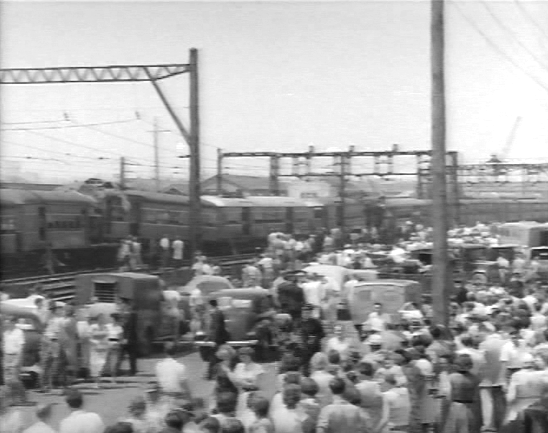
- Sydenham rail disaster
  December 19 – Australia – Sydenham rail disaster: a passenger train of the New South Wales Railways runs into the rear of another train. Five people are killed and 748 injured.
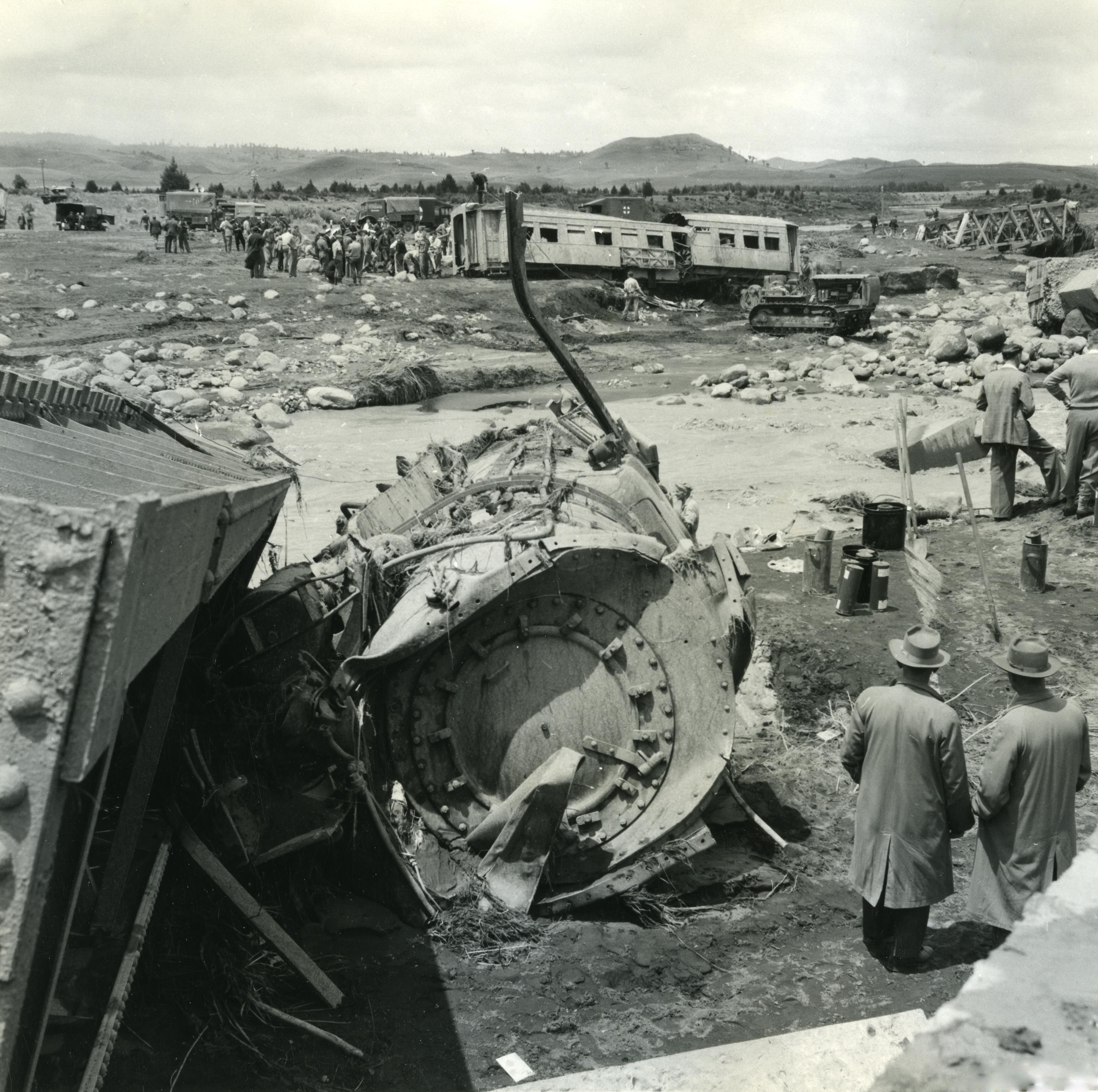
- Tangiwai disaster
  December 24 – New Zealand – Tangiwai disaster: An overnight Wellington-to-Auckland express train falls into the Whangaehu River, after the rail bridge is destroyed by a lahar from Mount Ruapehu's crater lake just minutes earlier. 151 people were killed.
- December 24 – Czechoslovakia – Šakvice train collision: An express from Prague to Bratislava crashes into a local train in Šakvice station, now in Czechia; different sources say that 103 people or about 186 people are killed. A railwayman is arrested for gross negligence.

== 1954 ==
- January 21 – Pakistan – A mail train from Lahore to Karachi crashes into a derailed gasoline tank car between Jhampir and Braudabad, starting a fire; about 60 are killed.
- January 30 – Egypt – President Mohammed Naguib visits Ibyar, a village devastated by fire, then goes to Kafr El Zayat station to board his special train. People eager to meet him press forward onto the track where a Cairo-to-Alexandria express is approaching; 28 are killed, including three policemen, and many injured.
- January 31 – South Korea – A passenger train crashes into an empty freight car between Suwon and Osan, killing 57 people and injuring at least 100.
- February 3 – United Kingdom – An express passenger train is derailed by a broken rail at Watford Junction, Hertfordshire. Fifteen people are injured.
- March 31 – India – At Jagatbela, Uttar Pradesh, in the third-class passenger accommodation on train 313 from Katihar to Kanpur on the North Eastern Railway, some gelignite being transported by police is reportedly ignited by electricity. The explosion kills 37 people and injures 40. Accounts vary from one policeman with one stick of gelignite to 5 policemen and 1,500 sticks.
- July 3 – France – At Châteaubourg, a period of temporary single-track operation has ended, but a pointsman mistakenly routes a train onto the other track. Consequently, a 4-car diesel multiple-unit train from Lyon to Nîmes collides head-on with a shunting locomotive. More than 30 people die in the collision, and one man arriving with rescuers dies of a heart attack on seeing the wreckage. The pointsman is arrested.
- July 24 − West Germany – At a level crossing in Abenheim the driver of a bus tries to cross the line in front of an advancing train. The locomotive hits the bus. 26 die (including the bus driver), five more are injured (including the two men on the engine).
- August 22 – United States – Atchison, Topeka and Santa Fe Railway train 19 The Chief derails at 89 miles per hour (143 km/h) at Lomax, Illinois, resulting in four deaths and 41 injured. The derailment was caused by a broken equalising beam on the only heavyweight car in the train.
- September 2 – Philippines – Fabrica train crash: near Fabrica, Negros Occidental: 16 loaded wagons break loose from a heavily loaded timber train as it creeps down a steep grade. In an attempt to outrun the loose wagons, the driver hurries his locomotive and seven coupled wagons down the mountain, but the runaway wagons catch up with the train at a bridge. Many wagons are derailed, the bridge is wrecked, and five wagons fall off the bridge into a gorge. More than 100 people had been travelling on flat wagons on the train; at least 82 are killed.
- September 9 – South Africa – In the Loraine gold mine at Odendaalsrus, the locomotive hauling a load of steel falls into an elevator shaft and smashes into the double-deck elevator 4,700 feet (1,400 m) below ground. There are 72 miners in the elevator but only 10 deaths and 3 people injured. (See also the Vaal Reefs mining disaster, a similar accident in 1995.)
- September 13 – Portugal – An express from the Algarve to Lisbon derails at Odemira, killing 27 people.
- September 27 – India – An express from Secunderabad in the direction of Kazipet runs onto a bridge between Jangaon and nearby Raghunathpalli. Weakened by recent flooding, the bridge collapses under the train. Several cars end up in the riverbed and/or are swept away by the water; 139 people are killed.
- October 16 – Canada – near Southampton, Ontario: A mixed train operating between Palmerston and Southampton derails while crossing a culvert near its destination, as the track gives way due to flooding by heavy rains from Hurricane Hazel. The engineer and fireman are killed.
- October 31 - Yugoslavia - Zagreb tram accident: a tram going downhill experiences brake failure and derails at the bottom. It rolls over a distance of 40 meters before crashing into a street light, causing 19 fatalities and 37 injuries.
- December 2 – Belgium – Wilsele, near Leuven: A train chartered to carry football fans from Germany to the UK derails due to a points failure. 20 German football fans are killed, 40 injured.
- December 28 – United States – Dunkirk, New York: a freight train and a wrecking train collide head-on. 12 train-service employees and 12 mechanical department employees are injured.

== 1955 ==
- January 23 – United Kingdom – Sutton Coldfield rail crash, England: a passenger train rounds a sharp curve too fast and derails at Sutton Coldfield station; 17 people die as a result.
- January 24 – United Kingdom – A London Transport electric multiple unit derails at Aldersgate, London.
- April 3 – Mexico – Guadalajara: A derailed train falls into a canyon. One source says 13 killed, others say about 300 killed.
- April 19 – United Kingdom – Two trains collide at Newcastle Central, Northumberland.
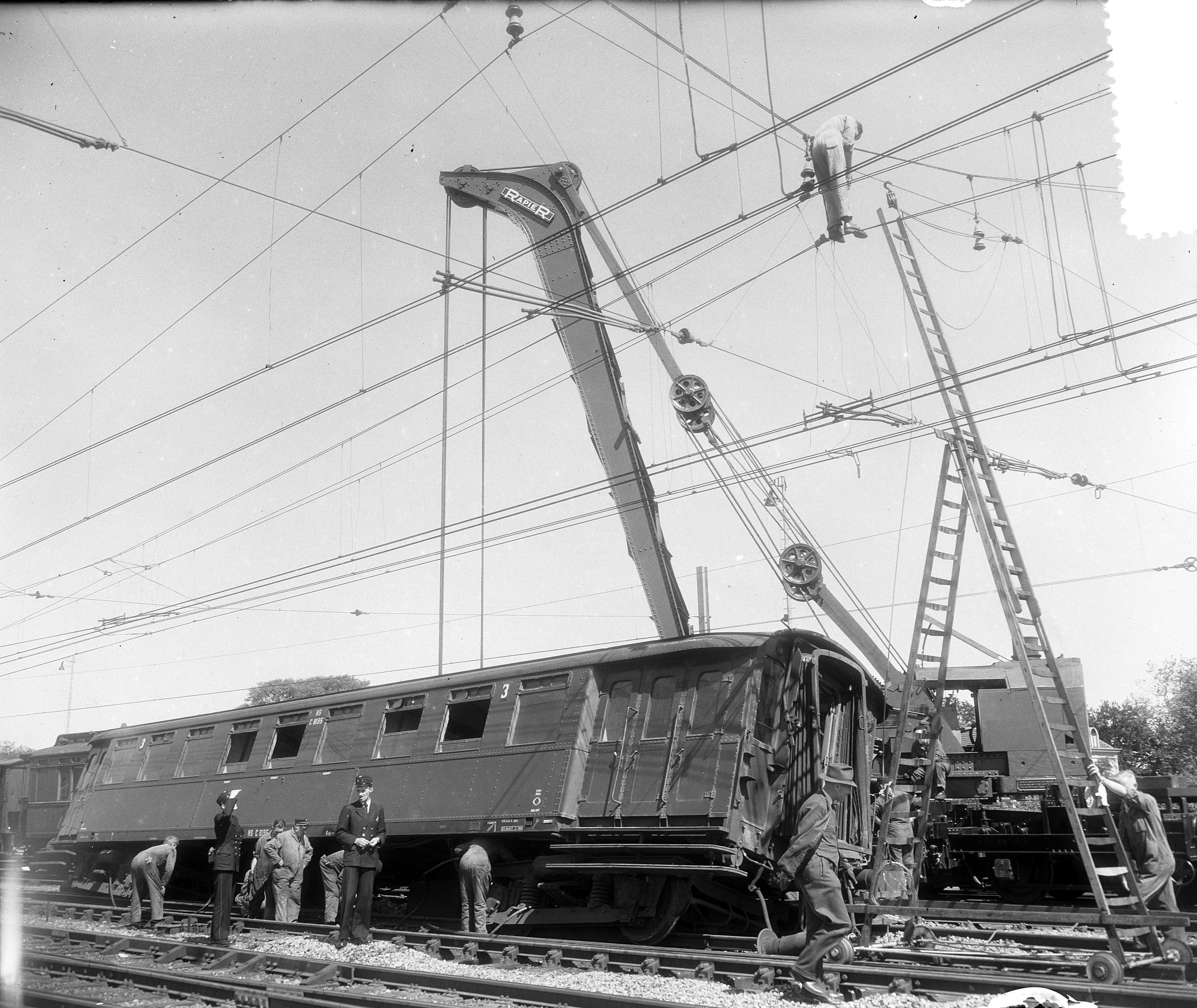
- Haarlem
  July 10 - Netherlands - A passenger train is derailed near Haarlem, North Holland.
- July 17 – Chile – San Bernardo train crash, San Bernardo, Collision in fog, 38 people killed, 58 injured.
- August 7 – United Kingdom – An express passenger train is derailed at Barby, Northamptonshire when it takes a crossover at excessive speed. The driver was unaware that the planned crossover at Braunston and Willoughby had been altered. Eighteen people were injured.
- August 23 – Argentina – At Ciudadela, near Buenos Aires, a rear-end collision of two passenger trains kills 21 and injures 50.
- September 1 – United Kingdom – The locomotive of a passenger train derails at Peterborough, Huntingdonshire due to a broken frame in its front bogie.
- September 23 – Mexico – Torreón: A mixed passenger/freight train collides with one of two trucks carrying explosives, whose drivers were racing each other. Both trucks explode. At least 65 people killed, 100 injured.
- November 20 – United Kingdom – Milton rail crash: a passenger train takes a crossover at excessive speed and derails at Milton, near Didcot, England. 11 people killed, 157 injured.
- December 2 – United Kingdom – Barnes rail crash: collision due to signalman's error, and consequent fire. 13 people killed, 35 injured.
- December 22 – United Kingdom – Luton rail crash: two passenger trains collide at Luton station. One passenger killed, 23 injured.
- December 22 – United Kingdom – An express passenger train overruns signals and is in a rear-end collision with another express passenger train at Hellifield, Yorkshire. Irregular operation of signals is a major contributory factor. The signalman at Hellifield South Junction Signal Box is blamed for the accident.

== 1956 ==
- January 13 – Sweden – An iron-ore train that should have stopped at Ställdalen to wait for a passenger railcar suffers a brake failure and is allowed to proceed on the main line. The trains collide, killing 20 people (some of them schoolchildren) and injuring 9.
- January 22 – United States – Redondo Junction train wreck, Los Angeles: Bound for San Diego, two coupled Santa Fe Rail Diesel Cars (RDCs), making up train No. 82, derail and topple over at 69 mph (111 km/h) in an evening high-speed accident, killing 30 persons on board and seriously injuring 117. The accident marked the end of the RDC units' service on the Santa Fe company's "Surf Line."
- February 14 – Chile – Santiago rail crash: 23 people are killed and 198 injured when two trains collide in fog near Santiago.
- February 25 – East Germany – A fast freight train runs past signals in fog and crashes into a Dresden-to-Leipzig express at Bornitz (in Liebschützberg); 43 people are killed and four railwaymen are sentenced to prison.
- February 28 – United States – Swampscott train wreck, Swampscott, Massachusetts: A Boston and Maine Railroad RDC train runs into the back of another stationary passenger train which had stopped because signals were obscured by fallen snow. 13 people are killed.
- February 28 - United States – A collision in Revere, Massachusetts injured 143 people – some of whom had already been in the Swampscott wreck earlier that day.
- March 23 – Egypt – A speeding express train of the Egyptian state railways plunges into a deep canal near Maghagha, with hundreds of injuries reported.
- May 2 – Canada – In Galt (now part of Cambridge, Ontario), a westbound Canadian Pacific Railway freight train with two steam locomotives crashes into another westbound freight that should have waited in a siding for it. The lead locomotive falls off a bridge; two crewmen in it are killed and a third man critically injured.
- May 5 – Canada – A Canadian Pacific Railway passenger train from Medicine Hat to Vancouver collides head-on at Seven Persons, Alberta, with a single-car Dayliner from Lethbridge to Medicine Hat. Several people are injured and one elderly passenger dies of shock.
- June 30 – Mexico – Oaxaca: Following heavy rain and possibly a landslip, two cars of a train from Mexico City derail and drop into a ravine, killing 30 people.
- August 1 – Brazil – On the Estrada de Ferro Central do Brasil, a passenger and a freight train collide at Barra do Piraí and at least 20 are killed.
- August 25 – United Kingdom – An empty passenger train crashes through the buffer stops at Filey Holiday Camp, Yorkshire because the brake pipe was not connected between the locomotive and train.
- September 2 – India – 1956 Mahbubnagar train accident: On the metre-gauge railway between Secunderabad and Dronachalam, a bridge collapse near Mahbubnagar causes two cars of a train to fall into a river. At least 112 people are killed, including everyone in the first car; postal workers in the second car are able to rescue the mail. Another 22 are injured.
- September 5 – United States – near Robinson, New Mexico: Two Santa Fe express passenger trains collide when a railroad worker prematurely throws a switch directly in front of one of the trains. 20 railroad employees, mostly dining car personnel, are killed.
- September 6 – United Kingdom – A parcels train overruns signals at Ludlow, Shropshire and runs into the rear of an express passenger train.
- October 13 – United Kingdom – Longmoor Military Railway, Hampshire, United Kingdom: A passenger train hauled by Class 8F 2-8-0 WD512 is involved in a head-on collision with a permanent-way train hauled by 0-6-0 diesel shunter WD877 Bari between Weaversdown Halt and Liss Forest Road stations. Six soldiers are killed and eight are injured.
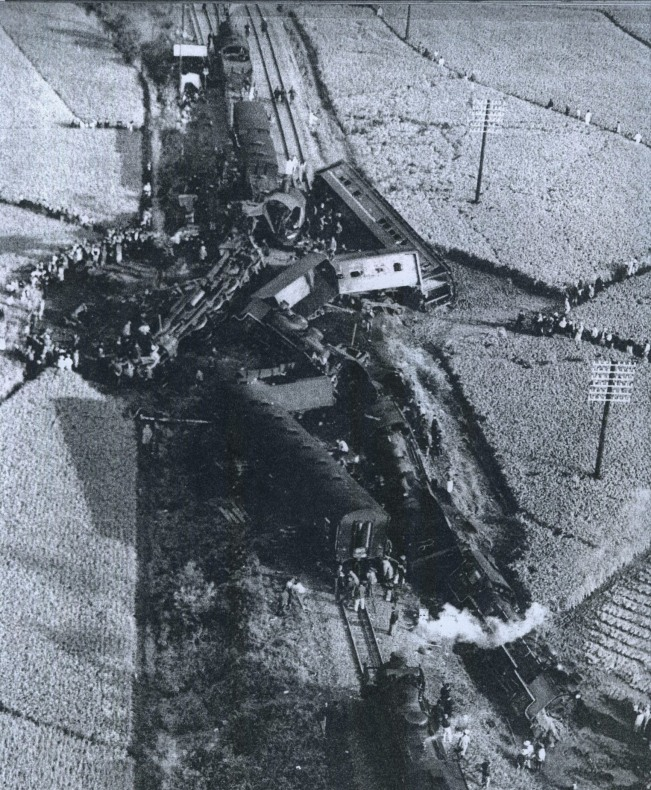
- Rokken rail accident
  October 15 – Japan – Rokken rail accident: Two passenger trains collide head-on at Rokken; 40 people are killed and 98 injured, and three members of the engine crews are arrested for manslaughter.
- October 18 – United States – Pineola, Florida: Head-on collision between two Atlantic Coast Line Railroad freight trains. Five crewmen are killed.
- November 23 – India – A Madras-Tuticorin Express derails at Maradaiyar River bridge at Ariyalur, Tamil Nadu, killing at least 154 people.
- December 19 – United States – A combination mail, freight express train of the Delaware, Lackawanna and Western Railroad derails at the Syracuse, New York terminal, with one railway post office car ending up suspended over a parking lot with only its coupling to the next car keeping it from dropping into the lot; one vehicle is crushed by its truck. Fireman Thomas Hale, 56, of Syracuse, dies of injuries.
- December 27 (approx) – Canada – Seven cars of a nine-car train carrying air force personnel derail near Brosseau Station in present-day Brossard, Quebec. The locomotive engineer and fireman were both killed.

== 1957 ==
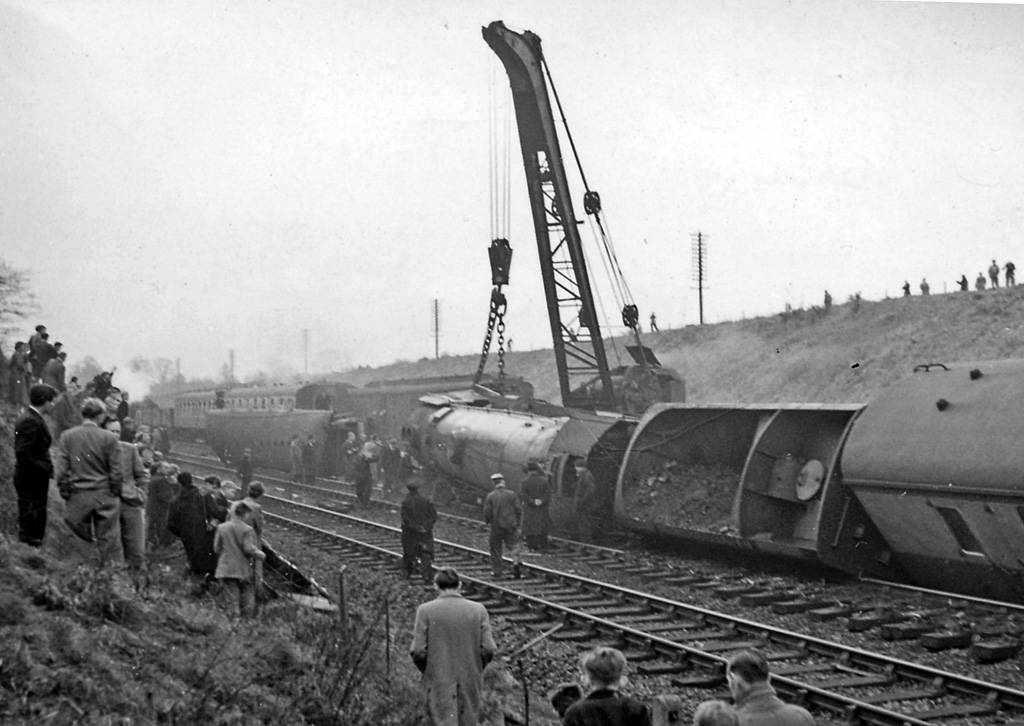
Welwyn Garden City.

- January 7 – United Kingdom – Welwyn Garden City rail crash: An Aberdeen–London express train passes a red signal in mist and collides with the rear of a slower-moving local train. One person is killed and 25 injured.
- February 9 – United Kingdom – The engine crew of an unfitted freight train are forced out of the cab when live steam pours into it from a broken pipe. This causes a rear-end collision with another freight train at Chapel-en-le-Frith, Derbyshire. Two men are killed, including driver John Axon, who is awarded a posthumous George Cross for his actions in staying with the train after control had been lost.
- March 15 – Finland – Due to a failure in the transmission of train orders, two expresses collide head-on at Kuurila, about 30 miles (50 km) south of Tampere. There is a blizzard and the trains are moving at speed; 26 people are killed and 48 injured.
- April 8 – South Africa – Two suburban trains collide at Woodstock; at least 20 are killed and 45 injured.
- July 3 – France – A collision between Mauves and Saint-Péray kills 35 people and injures 42.
- July 19 – France – Due to a mix-up in dispatching, an express from Nice to Paris is diverted into a siding at Bollène. The driver is able to slow to 60 mph (100 km/h) but the train derails on the turnout. One car comes to rest on top of the steam locomotive, whose boiler is penetrated in the crash, so that many passengers are severely burned. About 17 people are killed immediately, and 20 or 30 altogether, with about 70 injured.
- August 4 – Spain – A double-headed troop train crashes into a light engine at Villaverde. Of some 800 people on board, at least 22 are killed and 51 injured.
- August 9 – United Kingdom – Staines rail crash: An electric multiple unit departs from Staines, Middlesex and is involved in a head-on collision with another train. Nine people are hospitalised.
- September 1 – British Jamaica – Apparently because a stopcock in the brake line is accidentally bumped by a coupler, the brakes fail on a heavily loaded 12-car church excursion train returning from Montego Bay to Kingston. The crew fails to detect and act on the problem until the train runs away and derails on a curve at Kendal. Five cars roll into a ditch and two become wedged in a narrow cutting; 179 people are killed and hundreds injured.
- September 7 – France – Approaching a section where one track is closed for construction, a train from Paris to Nîmes fails to slow for the crossover at Nozières-Brignon station, and reaches it at 92 km/h (57 mph) instead of 30 km/h. The locomotive derails and breaches a culvert under the track, which stops it suddenly, worsening the pileup of cars. There are 27 people killed and 134 injured, 30 seriously.
- September 29 – British Nigeria – A 16-car train from Lagos to Kano is being driven carefully because of possible track damage from heavy rain, but when a culvert becomes blocked, the water rises rapidly and the driver is still caught unawares by the resulting washout, about 20 miles (30 km) south of Ibadan. Seven cars derail; early reports indicate 300 people missing, but it turns out that many of them walked away. However, 66 are killed and 122 injured.
- September 29 – Pakistan – Gambar train crash: At Montgomery, a Karachi-bound express passenger train collides at full speed with a stationary oil-tanker train before midnight. 300 people are killed and 150 injured by the accident.
- October 20 – Turkey – Yarımburgaz train disaster:, Two passenger trains collide head-on when signalmen allow the trains into same occupied block section. The country's worst train accident with 95 deaths and 150 injuries.
- November 16 – France – Due to human error, a Micheline passenger train to Chartres is signaled to leave La Roche-sur-Yon while a freight is still approaching on the single track. The trains crash head-on; 29 are killed and another 22 injured.
- November 16 – United States – The New York Central's Chicagoan, detoured off its normal route from Chicago to New York and thus behind schedule, runs at 48 mph (77 km/h) through a 15 mph (24 km/h) construction zone near White Pigeon, Michigan. At a level crossing, 11 of the 16 cars derail, killing the foreman of a 30-man postal crew and injuring 32 other people.
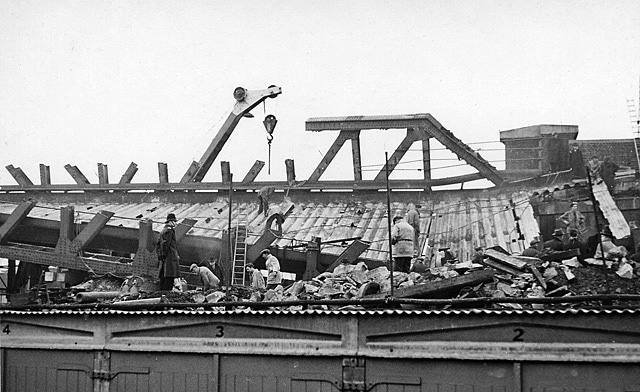
- The rail-over-rail bridge being dismantled
  December 4 – United Kingdom – Lewisham rail crash: A steam train passes a red signal in the fog and ploughs into the back of an electric train. The crash also destroys a support column of a railway bridge, causing parts of the bridge to collapse onto the wreck; fortunately, a train approaching the bridge is moving slowly enough to stop before derailing. 90 people are killed.
- December 9 – Italy – Codogno rail crash: A Milan–Rome express train travelling at 130 km/h (81 mph) collides with a truck trapped on a level crossing. The train derails and brings down a cast-iron pylon. Fifteen people are killed and more than 30 injured.
- December 9 – Taiwan – While approaching Yingge Station, the engineer of Taiwan Railways northbound train No. 22 hears stones being crushed under the wheels and pulls the brake as he fears the train is about to derail, but the brakes are too strong and the coal tender slams into the back of the locomotive, killing the engineer. The first passenger car then slams into the back of the coal tender and it and seven other passenger cars derail and overturn, killing 18 and injuring 116. Two children had been playing near the track and had stacked ballast on the rails. Locomotive CT271 repaired and returned to service until its retirement in 1983.

== 1958 ==
- January 1 – India – Soon after leaving Ambala, a local train to Delhi crashes head-on into a Delhi-to-Pathankot express standing in Mohri station. 32 people die, 85 are injured.
- January 24 – United States – Southern Railway passenger train, The Southerner, train Number 47, southbound for New Orleans, Louisiana, derails two cars due to a faulty switch at ≈0600 hours, while the consist was moving into a siding about one mile (1600 m) from the Spartanburg station. The two derailed cars were dragged about 200 yards (183 m) and struck a boxcar and a tank car on an adjacent track. Railway officials said that there were no injuries and relatively little damage. L. L. Walters, general superintendent of transportation at Charlotte, North Carolina, said that No. 47 was moving at about 10 m.p.h. (16 km/h) when the cars derailed. Passengers were moved into other cars and the train proceeded without delay. About 200 cross ties were chewed up.
- January 30 – United Kingdom – Dagenham East rail crash: A commuter train passes a danger signal and rear-ends the stopped train in front of it, killing 10 people and injuring 89.
- February 16 – United Kingdom – A passenger train rear-ends a light engine at Ince Moss Junction, Lancashire due to errors by the signalman and the driver of the light engine. Two people are killed.
- March 7 – Brazil – At Paciência station in suburban Rio de Janeiro, a train to Cosmos crashes into three stationary passenger trains (one going to Mangaratiba and two suburban). Early reports indicate 40 or 80 deaths; later ones give the total as 54, or as 58 with about 120 injured.
- May 8 – Brazil – Rio de Janeiro train crash: a commuter express train rams and crashes into another commuter train. Wreckage of cars is piled along embankments under a highway overpass near Mangueira station, in the outskirts of Rio de Janeiro. The accident kills 140 people and injures another 300.
- May 20 – United Kingdom – An engine and brake van collide head-on with a passenger train at Arkleston Junction, Paisley, Renfrewshire. One person is killed and 26 are hospitalised.
- May 21 – India – An express from Rajkot to Viramgam is derailed near its starting point, at Chamraj, killing 30 people.
- July 4 – United Kingdom – An electric multiple unit overruns signals at Maze Hill, London and collides head-on with a passenger train. Forty-five people are injured.
- July 28 – United Kingdom – A London Transport electric multiple unit develops a fault at Holland Park, London and catches fire. One person is killed and 50 are injured.
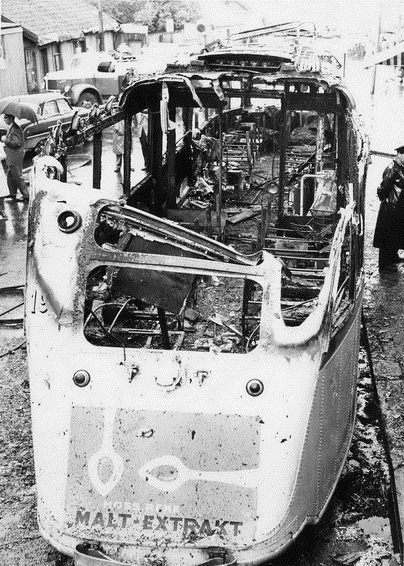
- Strømsveien tram fire
  August 2 – Norway – Strømsveien tram fire: An Oslo Tramway 2-car tram suffers an electrical fire in rear car 198 while braking to approach Totengata on Strømsveien street; five people die and 17 are injured. Fire extinguishers and improved emergency exits and door openers are subsequently mandated in all public transport.
- August 12 – United Kingdom – An electric multiple unit derails at Borough Market Junction, London due to defective track. Six people were injured.
- August 25 – United Kingdom – Eastbourne rail crash: A sleeper car steam train overruns signals at Eastbourne and collides head-on into a passenger electric multiple unit, killing five and injuring 41.
- September 2 – United Kingdom – The rear van of passenger train derails at Lunan Bay, Angus, causing the train to come to a halt due to a loss of vacuum. The train crew fail to realize that their train is incomplete, restore the vacuum and continue their journey, leaving a van obstructing the line. The signalman at Usan station fails to notice that the train is not displaying a tail lamp and gives "train out of section" to the signalman at Inverkeilor Signal Box. A passenger train consequently collides with the wreckage of the derailed van.
- September 14 – West Germany – On the Drachenfels Railway, a rack line climbing from Königswinter to the Drachenfels mountain, a steam locomotive and 3 cars derail; 17 people are killed and 94 injured.
- September 15 – United States – Newark Bay rail accident: A Central Railroad of New Jersey morning commuter train runs past stop signals protecting an open lift bridge. Both diesels and first two coaches plunge into Newark Bay and sink immediately; 48 people drown. Snagged by its rear truck, a third coach hangs precariously from the bridge for two hours (during which its passengers escape) before it, too, topples into the water.
- November 8 – Argentina – A steam locomotive collides with a passenger train in Palermo, Buenos Aires, killing 22 and injuring more than 100.
- November 12 – United Kingdom – A freight train overruns signals at Highworth Junction, Swindon, Wiltshire and is derailed by trap points. A passing newspaper train, hauled by GWR Castle Class locomotive 5009 Shrewsbury Castle runs into the wreckage. The driver is severely burnt by escaping steam due to a fractured pipe.
- December 23 – United Kingdom – Hastings Line 6L unit 1017 collides with 6B unit 1035 at Tunbridge Wells Central. Eighteen people are injured, with three of them admitted to hospital.

== 1959 ==
- February 7 – Chile – Sewell: A derailment in the mountains kills 33 people and injures 55.
- February 9 – Belgium – Two passenger trains collide head-on in thick fog on the outskirts of Verviers, killing three crew members and injuring 50 people.
- February 17 – United Kingdom – An electric multiple unit is in a rear-end collision with another at Crayford, Kent due to a signalman's error. Seventy people are injured.
- March 18 – United States – Beavercreek, Ohio: A car with 8 Girl Scouts and 2 troop leaders of the Beavercreek Girl Scouts is struck by a Pennsylvania Railroad freight train at the Factory Road crossing at Beavercreek, Ohio, killing all occupants. In memory of the victims of this tragedy the Angels Pass Memorial was placed at the Beavercreek Community Park.
- June 1 – Chile – In Santiago, a train crashes into a bus carrying 51 people; 11 are killed.
- June 5 – Brazil – At Engenheiro Goulart in São Paulo, a head-on collision, reportedly due to a signal defect, kills at least 43 people.
- June 20 – West Germany – Lauffen bus crash: At a manually controlled level crossing in Lauffen am Neckar, the crossing keeper improperly opens the gates to allow a bus through, and a train crashes into it. On the bus 45 passengers are killed and others are seriously injured.
- June 28 – United States – Meldrim trestle disaster: Tank cars carrying butane derail atop a wooden trestle owned by the Seaboard Air Line Railroad. The resulting explosion and fire kills 23.
- July 20 – United Kingdom – A light engine overruns signals and crashes into Dock Junction Signal Box, near St Pancras, London. Trains are handsignalled into and out of St Pancras for several days before the signal box can be repaired and returned to service.
- July 21 – Canada – At Bronte, Ontario, a track repair crew unspikes a rail without warning approaching trains. The CNR's Inter-City Limited from Chicago to Toronto derails at 70 mph (113 km/h). Of 213 passengers aboard, two are killed by a rail penetrating their coach, and about 30 are injured.
- July 22 – China – The 12 through passenger express train from Shenyang to Beijing was surrounded and blocked by floods in Qianwei town of Liaoning, Suizhong County, flooding the wheels. Led by the temporary Party branch of the train, the train retreated to the highland. In the next three days and nights, the train ran out of food and water, and the crew salvaged food in the water to satisfy their hunger until the ground rescue workers found it. On July 25, the train returned to Shenyang safely. In this process, the train not only protected the lives of 612 passengers, but also received and rescued more than 350 victims along the way. On August 13, the Ministry of Railways awarded the title of hero train of No.12 passenger train.
- September 10 – United States – Oakland, Maryland, a school bus from the Garrett County Board of Education stalled out on a railroad crossing and was hit by an oncoming train killing 7 children and injuring 11
- September 14 – Canada – At Brockville, Ontario, the 3-car Ottawa-to-Toronto portion of a CNR-CPR joint pool service train is being switched into a siding to wait for the portion from Montreal to be coupled onto it, when a 15-car way freight from Cornwall crashes into it. Four passengers in the dining car are killed and about 20 people are injured.
- October 24 – Canada – At a level crossing in Parkland, Alberta, a gasoline truck crashes into the rear car of a 2-car CPR passenger train going from Lethbridge to Calgary. The train derails, the gasoline burns fiercely, and the truck driver and 5 passengers are killed and 16 others require hospitalization.
- October 30 – United Kingdom – A passenger train overruns signals and is diverted by trap points at St Denys, Hampshire, where it is derailed.
- November 4 – United Kingdom – A freight train runs away at West Sleekburn, Northumberland and collides with a light engine. Two people are killed.
- November 10 – Canada – At Carbondale, Alberta, a Northern Alberta Railways passenger train from Dawson Creek to Edmonton collides with a freight train waiting to proceed the other way, and a tank car of diesel fuel explodes. Three people are killed in Carbondale station, which is destroyed in the fire, and one crewman on the freight train.
- November 12 – United Kingdom – A passenger train overruns signals and runs into the rear of another at East Ham, London. Thirteen people are injured.
- November 22 – United Kingdom – A passenger train is derailed by a washed-out bridge near Balnaguard Halt, Perthshire.
- December 5 – United States – A Santa Fe Chief passenger train collided with a truck hauling a bulldozer, critically injuring the Chief's engineer and fireman at the FM 518 crossing near Pearland, Texas. Officials later reported that 2 other passengers were injured. The train was speeding over the limit before colliding and sliding off the tracks into a nearby ditch.
- December 15 – United Kingdom – A passenger train collides with parcels vans at Victoria station, London. Eleven people are taken to hospital.

== See also ==
- List of road accidents – includes level crossing accidents.
- List of British rail accidents
- List of Russian rail accidents
- Years in rail transport

== Sources ==
- Beecroft, Geoffrey (1986). The Hastings Diesels Story. Chessington: Southern Electric Group. ISBN 0-906988-20-9.
- Earnshaw, Alan (1989). Trains in Trouble: Vol. 5. Penryn: Atlantic Books. ISBN 0-906899-35-4.
- Earnshaw, Alan (1990). Trains in Trouble: Vol. 6. Penryn: Atlantic Books. ISBN 0-906899-37-0.
- Earnshaw, Alan (1991). Trains in Trouble: Vol. 7. Penryn: Atlantic Books. ISBN 0-906899-50-8.
- Earnshaw, Alan (1993). Trains in Trouble: Vol. 8. Penryn: Atlantic Books. ISBN 0-906899-52-4.
- Haine, Edgar A. (1993). Railroad wrecks. Associated University Presses. ISBN 978-0-8453-4844-4.
- Hall, Stanley (1990). The Railway Detectives. London: Ian Allan. ISBN 0-7110-1929-0.
- Hoole, Ken (1982). Trains in Trouble: Vol. 3. Redruth: Atlantic Books. ISBN 0-906899-05-2.
- Hoole, Ken (1983). Trains in Trouble: Vol. 4. Truro: Atlantic Books. ISBN 0-906899-07-9.
- Moody, G.T. (1979) [1957]. Southern Electric 1909–1979 (Fifth ed.). Shepperton: Ian Allan Ltd. ISBN 0-7110-0924-4.
- Rolt, L. T. C.; Kichenside, G. M. (1982). Red for Danger: A history of railway accidents and railway safety (4th ed.). Newton Abbot, Devon: David & Charles. ISBN 0-7153-8362-0. OCLC 9526651.
- Semmens, Peter (1994). Railway Disasters of the World: Principal Passenger Train Accidents of the 20th Century. Patrick Stephens Ltd. ISBN 1-85260-323-2.
- Shaw, Robert B. (1978). A History of Railroad Accidents, Safety Precautions and Operating Practices. LCCN 78104064.
- Trevena, Arthur (1980). Trains in Trouble: Vol. 1. Redruth: Atlantic Books. ISBN 0-906899-01-X.
- Trevena, Arthur (1981). Trains in Trouble: Vol. 2. Redruth: Atlantic Books. ISBN 0-906899-03-6.
- Vaughan, Adrian (1989). Obstruction Danger. Wellingborough: Patrick Stephens Limited. ISBN 1-85260-055-1.
