= 1950 in rail transport =

This article lists events related to rail transport that occurred in 1950.

== Events ==
=== January ===
- January 26 – To provide an all-India rail route to Assam following the Partition of India, the Northeast Frontier Railway opens to passengers a new line between Kishanganj and Fakiragram (229 km (142 mi)) on which construction commenced only on January 26, 1948; also, Chittaranjan Locomotive Works, India, commences steam locomotive production, the first locomotive (class WG no. 8401) being rolled out on November 1.

=== February ===
- February 5 – The first diesel locomotive to pull a freight train on the San Diego and Arizona Railway begins its journey from El Centro, California, on a trial run.
- February 6 – A labor strike by United Mine Workers causes shortages of bituminous coal encouraging New England railroads to accelerate replacement of steam locomotives with diesel-electric locomotives.
- February 10 – Canadian National Railway gains control of Temiscouata Railway in the provinces of Quebec and New Brunswick.
- February 17 – Rockville Centre train crash: A head-on collision between two Long Island Rail Road evening trains in Rockville Centre, New York kills 32 and injures 158, the worst in the road's history until November.

=== March ===
- March 2 – The Nickel Plate Road runs its first mainline freight train powered by diesel locomotives, as two yard switchers are pressed into service to handle a train from Peru, Indiana, to Michigan City.

=== April ===
- April – The Canadian Pacific Railway registers its first, unsuccessful application with Canada's Board of Transport Commissioners to abandon passenger service on its interurban subsidiary, the Canadian Pacific Electric Lines.
- April 30 – The Pennsylvania Railroad replaces its Steeler with the Morning Steeler and Afternoon Steeler passenger trains between Pittsburgh, Pennsylvania and Cleveland, Ohio.

=== May ===
- May 6 – Pacific Electric quits the Los Angeles to San Bernardino railway post office, the last interurban RPO in the United States.
- May 7–8 Long Island Rail Road's Jamaica Bay Trestle erupts in a major fire between The Raunt and Broad Channel stations, destroying the bridge over Jamaica Bay, and leading to the eventual decline of the Rockaway Beach Branch five years later.
- May – ALCO introduces the ALCO RS-3.

=== June ===
- June 16 – Copper Range Railroad's coal unloading dock at Houghton, Michigan, is razed.

=== July ===
- July 2 – Pacific Electric service along the West Santa Ana Branch is truncated to Bellflower, California.

=== August ===
- August 1 – Indian Railways takes over most remaining state railways.
- August 8 – Illinois Central retires the Illinois Central 121 passenger trainset from active service; the trainset will soon be scrapped.
- August 22 – Canada's railroad workers go on strike, crippling operations across the country.
- August 27 – United States President Harry Truman orders the Army to take control of U.S. railroads to prevent a strike.

=== September ===
- September 15 – The first diesel locomotives produced at General Motors Electro-Motive Division's London, Ontario, works are delivered to the Canadian Pacific Railway.
- September 17 – The first of the 6000-series rapid transit cars (6001–6720), are placed in service on the Chicago "L" system. built by the St. Louis Car Company of St. Louis, Missouri, the number of these cars would eventually reach 720, dominating the CTA's fleet for decades. The first batch is placed in service on the Logan Square route.
- September 30 – Tasmanian Government Railways introduces X class into service, the first mainline diesel-electric locomotives purchased by an Australian government railway system.

=== October ===
- October 1 – First section of Stockholm Metro (Stockholms T-bana, Sweden) opened by conversion of the underground tram line from Slussen to Hökarängen.
- October 15 – Pacific Electric ceases operations on the El Monte–Baldwin Park Line.
- October 16 – The East Tennessee and Western North Carolina Railroad (ET&WNC) officially ceases operation on the 3 ft (914 mm) narrow gauge.

=== November ===
- November 21 – Canoe River train crash: A Canadian National Railway train carrying Korea-bound troops is given incorrect orders and collides with a passenger train at Canoe River (British Columbia), killing 21, including 17 soldiers.
- November 22 – Kew Gardens train crash A collision in rear between two Long Island Rail Road evening commuter trains between Kew Gardens and Jamaica stations in the Kew Gardens/Richmond Hill neighborhood of Queens, New York City, kills 78 and injures 363, the worst in the road's history.
- November 30 – Baldwin Locomotive Works becomes Baldwin-Lima-Hamilton Corporation.

=== Unknown date ===
- Ferrovie dello Stato, Italy, opens new Roma Termini railway station.
- Work on electrification of Saint Petersburg Railway Division of the Oktyabrskaya Railway, Russia begins.

== Births ==
- July 18 - Richard Branson, founder of Virgin Rail Group.

== Deaths ==
- February 11 - Victor V. Boatner, president of Peoria and Pekin Union Railway 1921-, Chicago Great Western Railway 1929–1931, dies (born 1884).
