= Woodbridge train derailment =

1951 disaster in New Jersey, U.S.

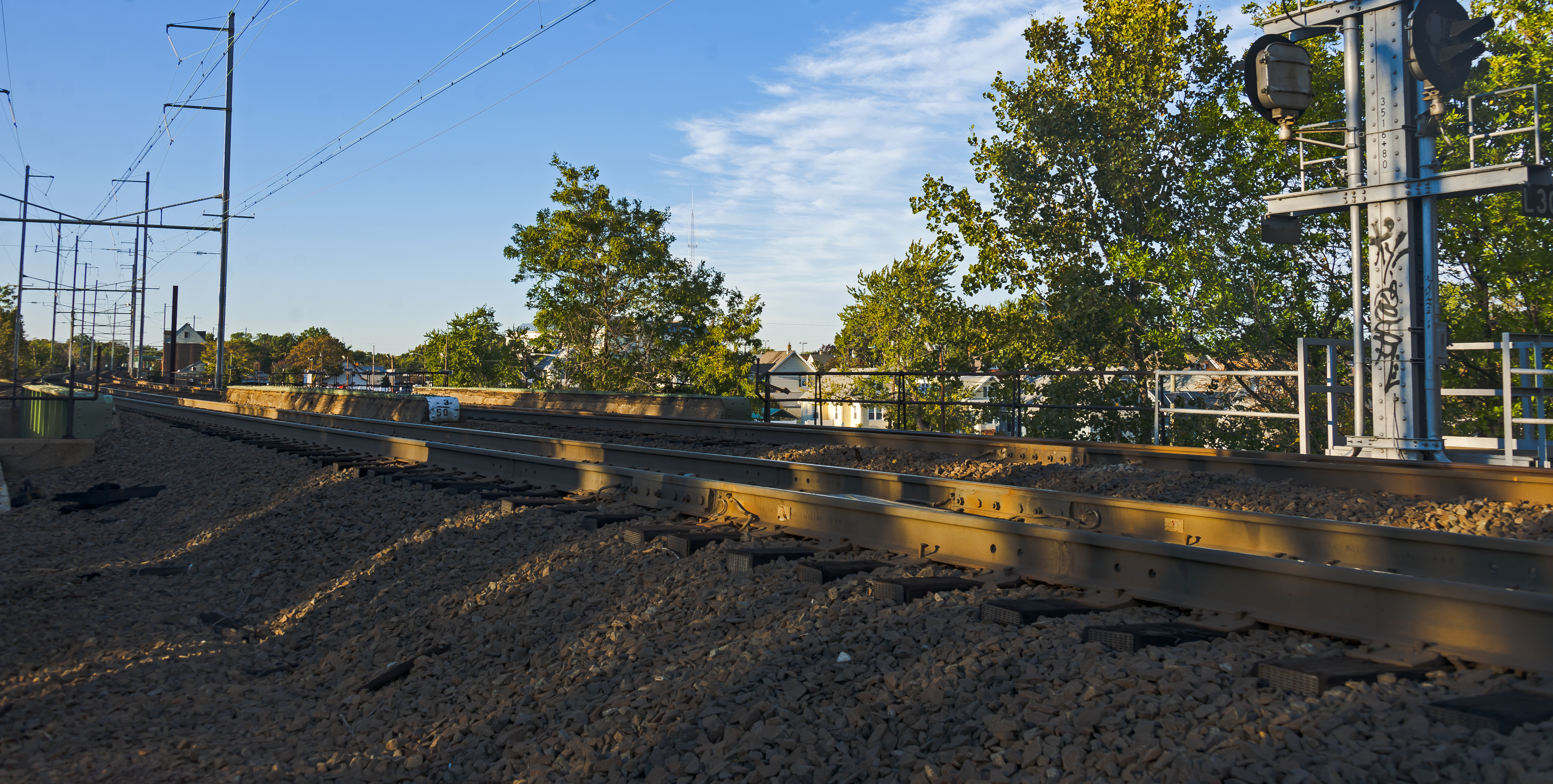
- Accident site in 2016

Details
- Date: February 6, 1951; 5:43 pm
- Location: Woodbridge, New Jersey
- Coordinates: 40.5518°N 74.2764°W
- Country: United States
- Line: North Jersey Coast Line
- Operator: Pennsylvania Railroad
- Incident type: Derailment at diversion
- Cause: Excessive speed due to lack of signalling

Statistics
- Trains: 1
- Deaths: 85
- Injured: ~500

On February 6, 1951, a Pennsylvania Railroad train derailed on a temporary wooden trestle in Woodbridge, New Jersey, United States, killing 85 passengers. It remains New Jersey's deadliest train wreck, the deadliest U.S. derailment since 1918 and the deadliest peacetime rail disaster in U.S. history.

== Description ==
Around 5:00 pm. on Tuesday, February 6, 1951, Pennsylvania Railroad (PRR) Train #733, nicknamed The Broker, left Exchange Place in Jersey City. An express train to Bay Head via the North Jersey Coast Line, No. 733 was crowded that day due to a labor strike on the nearby Jersey Central Railroad. It carried over 1,000 passengers in 11 cars (1033, 1560, 1367, 1068, 913, 3292, 1046, 1081, 3136, 9860, & 3846 (the Jersey Shore Commuter club car)) drawn by PRR K4s 4-6-2 steam locomotive #2445.

That afternoon, rail traffic through Woodbridge was being diverted onto a temporary wooden trestle and a shoofly near Fulton Street, allowing laborers building the New Jersey Turnpike to work on the main line. A notice had gone out to train engineers in late January after 1:01 pm. on February 6, they were to proceed through Woodbridge not at the normal 60 mph (97 km/h) but at 25 mph (40 km/h). However, the PRR at the time did not require any signal to be in place to warn approaching trains about the diversion, believing the verbal notification to be sufficient.

Before The Broker left Jersey City, conductor John Bishop reminded engineman (that is the Pennsylvania Railroad's referring for engineer) Joseph Fitzsimmons about the speed restriction. It was not the railroad's practice to install warning lights in such cases, and Fitzsimmons failed to slow the train as it approached Woodbridge. Bishop, alarmed at the train's speed, tried to pull the emergency cord, but the crush of passengers made this impossible.

The train was traveling faster than 50 mph (80 km/h) when it reached the curve approaching the trestle, according to a subsequent inquiry. At 5:43 pm, the tracks, which were not secured to sleepers but resting in shallow grooves on the top of the trestle, shifted under the massive locomotive, and eight of the train's eleven passenger cars derailed. The first two cars fell on their sides. The third and fourth cars crashed into each other as they hurtled down a 26-foot-high (7.9 m) embankment. It was in these two cars that most of the 85 deaths occurred. The fifth and sixth cars were left hanging in mid-air over a street that glistened from rain. Some passengers may have jumped to their deaths, believing they would land in water.

The accident occurred in a heavily populated area, so first responders soon arrived. Neighbors opened their houses and businesses to those in need. The critically injured were taken to nearby hospitals.

Although Fitzsimmons initially claimed that he had been traveling at only 25 mph (40 km/h), the inquiry estimated that The Broker's speed was between 50 and 60 mph (80 and 97 km/h). Fitzsimmons also stated that he was looking for trackside signals that would have warned him to slow down, but the line between the station and the temporary trestle lacked any. The report concluded that the wreck was caused by "excessive speed on a curve of a temporary track."

== Aftermath ==
Fitzsimmons continued working for the PRR until 1953, but never operated a train again. He died in 1976 at age 83, 25 years after the wreck. Surprisingly, #2445, the locomotive involved in the wreck, was repaired and put back into service despite the extensive damage it sustained, only to be retired and scrapped in 1953.

Near the derailment site, the victims are memorialized by a pair of historical markers, installed by New Jersey Transit in 2002 and by Woodbridge Township in 2013.

== In popular culture ==
In the prologue to his 1976 novel Slapstick, Kurt Vonnegut references the death of his brother-in-law, James Carmalt Adams, killed in the derailment of "The Brokers' Special", but Adams actually died in the 1958 Newark Bay rail accident.

== See also ==
- List of American railroad accidents
- List of rail accidents (1950–1959)
