= Nowy Dwór Mazowiecki train disaster =

1949 unconfirmed railway incident in Poland

The Nowy Dwór Mazowiecki train disaster was an alleged railway disaster that occurred in Nowy Dwór Mazowiecki, Poland, on 22 October 1949. According to some reports, about 200 people died; however, authorities never acknowledged it.

== Events ==
The Polish communist officials and media never acknowledged that the event had taken place, nor have any subsequent Polish authorities confirmed the occurrence of any such event. In 2020, an investigation by local journalists and amateur historians did not produce any conclusive evidence outside of a single eyewitness testimony. Other eyewitnesses did not see any fatalities, although they claimed to have heard about deaths from others.

News of the accident was reported abroad by the Associated Press and syndicated in a large number of regional newspapers in the US, such as the Gettysburg Times, Geneva Daily Times, Reading Eagle, The Singapore Free Press, and the Great Falls Tribune. Some reports cited an "unofficial but reliable" source.

According to said reports, a passenger train between Gdańsk and Warsaw derailed, killing 200 people.

== See also ==
- Rzepin train disaster, another train disaster in Poland that was not confirmed by Polish authorities
