= 1953 New York Central Railroad accident =

Railway incident in Ohio, United States

Details
- Date: March 27, 1953; 10:02 p.m.
- Location: 2.4 mi (3.9 km) east from Conneaut, Ohio
- Coordinates: 41.954185°N 80.525533°W
- Country: United States
- Line: New York Central Railroad
- Incident type: Multi-train accident
- Cause: Improperly secured load

Statistics
- Trains: 4
- Deaths: 21
- Injured: 49

An accident occurred on the four-track mainline of the New York Central Railroad at 10:02 p.m. on March 27, 1953, 2.4 miles (3.9 km) east of Conneaut, Ohio. It began when an improperly secured load of pipe broke loose from a gondola car on an eastbound freight train, damaging the westbound passenger track. A passing westbound freight crew notified the first train and stopped to assess what had happened, but a fast westbound passenger train could not stop and was derailed by the damaged track, colliding with the adjacent westbound freight. Finally, an eastbound fast passenger train struck the derailed equipment from the first two trains. There were 21 deaths and 49 people were injured.

== Site ==
The accident occurred on the mainline of the Erie Division at a point 2.4 miles (3.9 km) east of Conneaut and 1,861 feet (567 m) from the Ohio-Pennsylvania state line. This was on the famous Water Level Route, a four-track mainline where fast passenger trains from the Midwest ran on an almost gradeless route to New York. The main tracks here, from south to north, were designated as No. 4, eastward freight; No. 2, eastward passenger; No. 1, westward passenger; and No. 3, westward freight. It was raining at the time of the accident. The distance between the center-lines of adjacent tracks was 13 feet (4.0 m).

== Accident ==
=== Trains involved ===
- Extra 1871 East was an eastbound freight consisting of two diesel-electric units, 103 cars, and a caboose. It was moving on track No. 4 at a speed of 36 miles per hour (58 km/h).
- Extra 1736 West was a westbound freight powered by two diesel-electric units pulling 120 cars and a caboose. It was moving on track No. 3 at a speed of 31 miles per hour (50 km/h).
- No. 5, the New York to Chicago Mohawk, was a first-class passenger train consisting of two diesel-electric units and eleven cars: a mail car, two express cars, one baggage car, two coaches, one sleeping car, one club-sleeping car, two sleeping cars, and one observation-sleeping car. It was proceeding westbound on track No. 1 at a speed of 76 miles per hour (122 km/h).
- No. 12, the St. Louis to New York Southwestern Limited, was also a first-class passenger train. It consisted of two diesel-electric units and twelve cars: one baggage-dormitory car, two coaches, one dining car, two sleeping cars, one coach, four sleeping cars, and one observation-sleeping car. It was traveling eastbound on track No. 2 at a speed of 71 miles per hour (114 km/h).

=== Events ===
- Immediately east of the point where the accident occurred, Extra 1871 East met Extra 1736 West moving on track No. 3. The flagman of Extra 1871 East observed the stop signals given with a white light from the rear platform of the caboose of the west-bound train. He acknowledged the signals and immediately informed his conductor. The brakes of the train were then applied from the caboose by the use of the conductor's valve. The train stopped with the front end in the vicinity of Springfield, Pa., 3.2 miles (5.1 km) east of the point of the accident. The flagman immediately proceeded westward to provide flag protection, and the conductor inspected the train.
- The seventy-third car of 1871 East, Baltimore and Ohio gondola car #254645, was loaded with 58 pieces of pipe. Each pipe was approximately 35 feet (11 m) long and 18 inches (46 cm) in diameter. The conductor found the side stakes had broken on the north side of the car, and part of the lading had fallen from the car. He observed that the ends of high-tension bands used to secure the load were trailing over the sides of the car, counted 49 pieces of pipe on the car, and later made a notation on the waybill that nine pieces of pipe were missing. After he completed his examination of the car, he uncoupled it from the rear portion of the train and instructed the front brakeman to assist in the movements necessary to set out the car on an adjacent auxiliary track. Before the car was set out, he communicated by telephone with the train dispatcher to inform him of the delay to his train and that some pipe pieces were missing from the car. The dispatcher then informed him that the accident had occurred.
- The crew of Extra 1736 West approached the point of the accident on track No. 3 at a speed of 31 miles per hour (50 km/h). When the locomotive passed the point at which the accident occurred, the crew did not observe any defective condition of the tracks or any obstruction on or near the tracks. The flagman proceeded to the rear platform of the caboose to inspect Extra 1871 East moving on track No. 4. He observed sparks flying from the vicinity of the running gear of a car about midway of that train. When its caboose passed, he gave stop signals with a white light, which were acknowledged. He then entered the caboose and informed his conductor of the defective condition he had observed.
- Immediately afterward, No. 5, moving on track No. 1, was approaching the point where the accident occurred at a speed of 76 miles per hour (122 km/h). The train was moving on a curve to the right and was passing Extra 1736 West moving on track No. 3. The engineer then observed that the track immediately in front of his locomotive had been shifted northward toward track No. 3. Before he could move the brake valve to the emergency position, the locomotive was derailed and collided with Extra 1736 West. At about the same time, the locomotive of No. 12 passed the locomotive of No. 5.
- As No. 12 was approaching the point where the accident occurred at 71 miles per hour (114 km/h), the engineer made an emergency application of the brakes when the locomotive was passing the locomotive of No. 5. The fireman observed fire flying as derailed equipment obstructed track No. 2 immediately in front of the locomotive. The collision occurred before the speed of the train was materially reduced. No. 12's locomotive and the first 10 cars were derailed and collided with Extra 1736 West.
- The seventy-sixth car of 1736 West was struck by the derailed locomotive and equipment of No. 5, and the seventy-fifth to the ninetieth cars, inclusive, were derailed. Immediately after the collision occurred, the derailed equipment of No. 5, which obstructed track No. 2, was struck by train No. 12. The derailed cars of Extra 1736 West stopped in various positions on or near the westward main tracks. The seventy-eighth, eighty-first, eighty-second, and eighty-fourth cars were destroyed. The seventy-sixth, seventy-seventh, and eightieth cars were badly damaged, and the other derailed cars of this train were somewhat damaged.
- A separation occurred between the locomotive and the first car of No. 5. The diesel-electric units remained coupled and stopped about in line with the track and with the front end about 740 feet (230 m) west of the point of the accident. Both diesel-electric units were badly damaged. Separation occurred at each end of each of the first six cars, and these cars stopped in various positions on and across the tracks and intermingled with the derailed equipment of Extra 1736 West. The seventh car stopped with the front end against derailed equipment on track No. 3 and the rear end on the train structure of track No. 1, and the other derailed cars stopped in line with that track. The first six cars were destroyed, and the other derailed cars of this train were badly damaged.
- The locomotive and the first nine cars of No. 12 derailed. Separation occurred between the locomotives and the first car. The locomotive units stopped in diagonal positions with the front end of the first unit south of the westward main tracks and about 95 feet (29 m) east of the point of the accident. The second unit stopped at right angles to the tracks and with the front end against the left rear corner of the first unit. Both units were badly damaged. The first four cars stopped in diagonal positions intermingled with the derailed cars of the other two trains, and the other derailed cars stopped about in line with the track. The first two cars were destroyed, and the other derailed cars of this train were badly damaged.

== Rescue effort ==
The accident site was isolated from any main road. Only a muddy dirt lane led from the crash site to a major road 2 miles (3.2 km) south, and it soon became blocked by vehicles mired in the mud. The injured were either carried on stretchers or moved by hand car to the nearest road. Some waited up to four hours for help. About 100 persons were treated on the scene and 62 were transported to hospitals.

== Investigation ==
The Interstate Commerce Commission investigated the accident. Their findings indicated that the lading of Baltimore and Ohio car 254645 on Train Extra 1871 East was not properly secured for movement when loaded because the high tension bands were not properly sealed. Because the load was not properly secured, nine sections of pipe fell from the car while in transit. When the pipes fell from the car in question, one piece wedged between the track structure of track No. 1 and the next car, a boxcar. As the train proceeded at a speed of 36 miles per hour (58 km/h), the resultant thrust transmitted by the pipe to track No. 1 moved track No. 1 northward a distance of about 18 inches (46 cm) before the pipe fell clear of the cars. The damaged condition of the track was not observed before passenger train No. 5 arrived at the point of the accident. The track was sufficiently damaged to cause the derailment of train No. 5 which in turn caused the derailment of Extra 1736 West. Passenger train No. 12 struck the derailed equipment of passenger train No. 5 before protection could be provided.

== See also ==
- 1953 in rail transport
- List of rail accidents (1950–59)
