= Kendal, Jamaica =

Human settlement in Jamaica

Coordinates: 18°05′00″N 77°29′00″W

Kendal is a small town in Manchester located between Mandeville and Christiana in central Jamaica.

== Geology ==
Limestone containing red bauxite has been reported in Kendal.

== 1957 rail accident ==
On 1 September 1957, a train carrying churchgoers from the Kingston-based St Anne's Catholic Church derailed at Kendal, killing close to 200 people and injuring hundreds. It is the deadliest rail accident in Jamaican history.

== See also ==
- Railway stations in Jamaica
- List of rail accidents (1950–1959)
