= 1957 Kendal rail crash =

Railway incident in Jamaica

- Location of the crash

Details
- Date: 1 September 1957; 23:30
- Location: Near Kendal, Manchester
- Coordinates: 18°05′00″N 77°29′00″W
- Country: British Jamaica
- Line: Kingston to Montego Bay railway
- Operator: Jamaica Government Railway
- Incident type: Derailment
- Cause: Accidental closure of a brake cock and excessive speed

Statistics
- Passengers: Approximately 1,600
- Deaths: 171 - 200
- Injured: 400 - 800

The 1957 Kendal rail crash occurred on the night of 1 September 1957 near the town of Kendal in Manchester, Jamaica, when a heavily overloaded excursion train derailed after its brakes failed approaching a curve in the track. The train had been carrying passengers at 130 to 150 per coach against a rated capacity of 80, adding up to roughly 1,600 people aboard as it barrelled through the night. The train, chartered by the Holy Name Society of St. Anne's Roman Catholic Church in Kingston, was on its way back from an all-day excursion to Montego Bay when several of its twelve wooden coaches left the rails. The official death toll was 171, with around 400-800more injured, though other contemporary and later accounts put the number of dead close to 200 it is remembered as the worst rail disaster in Jamaica's history, and was described at the time as one of the worst in the world.

A subsequent Railway Commission of Enquiry attributed the crash to the accidental closure of a brake cock. The government observed 8 September 1957 as a National Day of Mourning, and in the wake of the disaster the railway's wooden coaches were replaced with steel ones and the Jamaica Government Railway was reorganised into the Jamaica Railway Corporation.

== Background and context ==
In the autumn of 1957, the Jamaica Government Railway operated the island's primary rail network, connecting Kingston on the southern coast to major hubs like Montego Bay in the north. Rail transit served as the backbone for mass public transport, and large-scale excursions organized by churches, social clubs, and civic groups were common methods for moving large crowds across the island's rugged interior terrain.

On 1 September 1957, the Holy Name Society of St. Anne's Roman Catholic Church in Kingston organized a massive religious excursion train bound for Montego Bay. The outbound journey went smoothly with no incident occurring. Fuelled by lax boarding protocols and heavy demand, the 12-car wooden carriage train crammed in an estimated 1,600 passengers. This severe overcrowding meant hundreds of travelers, blending church members, holidaymakers, and opportunistic pickpockets, were forced onto the open carriage platforms and gangways for the perilous journey back south.

== Derailment ==
At approximately 23:30 that evening, the train approached Kendal. As the train approached a sharp curve, train's brakes failed. Unable to slow down, the train sped into the curve and derailed, causing several coaches to overturn.

== Aftermath ==
=== Casualties ===
The crash had a significant amount of casualties. About 171 people died with hundreds more injured. However, other estimates suggest around 200 people died with anywhere between 400 and 800 people injured on top of that. At the site of the crash, victims were found inside, below, and on top of the coaches. Hospitals in Spaldings and May Pen were also significantly overwhelmed. Looters also came to the site of the crash and looted many dead and injured victims.

=== Impact on public confidence ===
The disaster severely damaged public confidence in Jamaica's railway system. The National Library of Jamaica noted that confidence in rail transport took a sharp decline following the crash. The tragedy became a major national event, with widespread mourning and public attention focused on the safety of railway operations.

== Investigation ==
Following the crash, the Jamaican government established a Railway Commission of Enquiry to investigate the cause of the disaster. The commission concluded that the immediate cause of the derailment was the failure of the train's braking system, specifically the closure of an angle brake cock that prevented the brakes from operating properly. The inquiry found that the brake cock had been incorrectly closed and criticized failures within the Jamaica Government Railway, including issues with maintenance and safety procedures. Although some later accounts suggested that the brake failure may have resulted from vandalism, the inquiry did not definitively establish this as the cause. The Jamaican Government railway was also replaced with the Jamaica Railway corporation in 1960.

== Memorialisation ==
The Kendal train crash has continued to be commemorated as one of Jamaica's worst disasters. The crash site in Kendal became a place of remembrance, with the Jamaica National Heritage Trust recognizing it as a historic site. In 2017, the Jamaican government officially designated September 1 as a day of national commemoration for the victims and survivors of the disaster. A monument dedicated to those affected by the crash was later unveiled at Kendal in 2025, with plans for the site to include a memorial park and museum.
