= 1953 in rail transport =

This article lists events related to rail transport that occurred in 1953.

== Events ==
=== January events ===
- January 15 - The brakes fail on Pennsylvania Railroad's southbound Federal Express passenger train; the train barrels through the end of track barriers and stationmaster's office at Union Station (Washington, D.C.), but nobody is killed in the accident.

=== March events ===
- March - Union Pacific Railroad removes the streamliner trainset M-10003 from revenue service.
- March 5 - After Joseph Stalin's death this day, construction work ceases on the ill-fated Salekhard-Igarka Railway in Siberian Arctic.
- March 27 - Three train accident on the New York Central near Conneaut, Ohio, kills 21 and injures 49.
- March 31 - The Staten Island Railway closes its North Shore and South Beach Branches.

=== April events ===
- April - Fairbanks-Morse and Canadian Locomotive Company introduce the H-24-66 model Train Master diesel locomotive, at the time the most powerful single-engine diesel locomotive available.
- April 12 - Last run of the Orange Blossom Special passenger train in United States.

=== May events ===
- May 30 - The Cedar Rapids and Iowa City Railway runs its last passenger trains.

=== June events ===
- June 5 - The last steam locomotive runs on the Lackawanna Railroad.
- June 9 - Chesapeake and Ohio Railway 2-6-6-6 “Allegheny” number 1642 suffers a boiler explosion. All three head-end crew members are killed when the cab is blown in one piece 200 feet (61 m) in the air and 300 yards (270 m) off the mainline into the adjacent river. The boiler is blown off the running gear and flips end for end, coming to rest 600 feet (180 m) ahead of the train. The blast is blamed on a faulty feedwater injector and/or cold water pump.
- June 15 - The New York City Transit Authority is created.
- June 16 - The last steam powered through passenger train runs on the Canada Southern.
- June 16 - New York Central Railroad ends steam locomotive operation on the former Michigan Central Railroad with a train pulled by 4-6-4 number 5434.
- June 17 – The Southern Railway (US) runs its last steam locomotive and the remaining steam locomotives on the line go into standby service.
- June 22 - At the Annual Association of American Railroads railroad show the first Fairbanks-Morse Train Master diesel locomotives and Airslide covered hoppers are displayed, but for the first time no new steam locomotives are shown.
- June 26 - The Rutland Railroad becomes freight-only.

=== July events ===
- July 2 - Baltimore’s Museum of Transportation opens.
- July 13 - Last day of steam locomotive operations on the Cotton Belt and Lackawanna Railroads.
- July 25 - The New York City Subway begins using tokens for passenger fares.

=== August events ===
- August 8 - The northbound Royal Scot train derails near Abington in Scotland descending from Beattock Summit due to buckling of track caused by high temperature; 37 are injured.
- August 13 - The Chicago and North Western Railway begins Trailer-On-Flat-Car (TOFC, or "piggyback") service. The first route is an overnight service between Chicago and Green Bay, Wisconsin. At the start, two semi-truck trailers and a single fifty foot flat car are adequate to meet the demand.
- August 15 - The Irk Valley Junction rail crash in Manchester, England kills 10 people.

=== September events ===
- September 20 - The Chicago Aurora and Elgin Railroad ceases to operate into Chicago.

=== October events ===
- October - The North British Locomotive Company of Glasgow, Scotland, begins delivery of class 25 4-8-4 locomotives to South African Railways (3 ft 6 in (1,067 mm) gauge), the largest rigid-frame steam locomotives built in the UK (with condensing tenders, 234 tons 7 cwt and 107 ft 6 in. over buffers).
- October 26
  - Electric operation of the Waldenburgerbahn in Switzerland begins using 1500 V DC and completely new rolling stock.
  - Passenger service is discontinued on the Pacific Electric Santa Monica Air Line.

=== November events ===
- November 9
  - Canadian National Railway extends the line from Lynn Lake to Sherridon, Manitoba.
  - Canadian Pacific Railway introduces Budd Rail Diesel Car service, "Dayliners", for lighter passenger train duties on some branch lines.
- November 15 - SNCF introduces 25 kV AC railway electrification on the line between Aix-les-Bains and La Roche-sur-Foron in south-eastern France as part of its trials of different railway electrification systems.
- November 16 - New York Central Railroad's electric locomotive operations end at Cleveland Union Terminal.

=== December events ===
- December 12 - Krauss-Maffei deliver first prototype Class V 200 diesel-hydraulic express locomotive to Deutsche Bundesbahn, Germany.
- December 14 - Atchison, Topeka and Santa Fe Railway discontinues extra-fare charges on the El Capitan passenger train between Chicago, Illinois, and Los Angeles, California.
- December 19 - An electric passenger train of the New South Wales Railways runs into the rear of another electric train, causing the Sydenham Rail Disaster. Five people die and 748 are injured.
- December 24 - The Prague-Bratislava express train in the Czech Republic whose crew have fallen asleep after several bottles of wine hits a commuter train at a station, killing 106 in the Šakvice train disaster.
- December 24 - 151 people die in the Tangiwai disaster in New Zealand when the Tangiwai Railway Bridge over the Whangaehu River collapses as the overnight express train between Wellington and Auckland passes over it; the bridge supports have been weakened by a lahar (a volcanic ash and debris filled flash flood) a few minutes earlier.
- December 29 - The last electric locomotive runs through the Detroit River Tunnel. It is replaced by diesel locomotives.
- December - Norfolk and Western Railway turns out class S1a 0-8-0 switcher #244 from its Roanoke Shops, the last conventional steam locomotive built for a United States Class I railroad.

=== Unknown date events ===
- The first Trailer-On-Flat-Car (TOFC, or "piggyback") equipment enters service on the Southern Pacific Railroad in the United States.
- Baghdad Central Station is opened by Iraqi State Railways.
- John W. Barriger III steps down from the presidency of the Monon Railroad in the United States.

== Deaths ==
=== February deaths ===
- February 14 – Richard Paul Wagner, locomotive designer for Deutsche Reichsbahn, 1922–1942, dies in Bavaria (born 1882).

=== May deaths ===
- May 30 – Sam Fay, General manager of the Great Central Railway, 1902–1922, dies in Hampshire, England (born 1856).
