= Piquet Carneiro train crash =

1951 railway incident in Brazil

Coordinates: 5°47′52″S 39°24′32″W

Details
- Date: December 17, 1951
- Location: Piquet Carneiro
- Country: Brazil
- Line: Fortaleza - Crato
- Operator: Rede Ferroviária do Nordeste
- Incident type: Derailment
- Cause: Excess speed

Statistics
- Trains: 1
- Deaths: 53

The Piquet Carneiro train crash, occurred on the December 17, 1951 at Piquet Carneiro in the state of Ceará in northeast Brazil and left 53 dead (some sources 'around 100').

The diesel train had left Crato the previous day, spending the night at Iguatu which it left at 5 a.m. The train derailed due to 'excessive speed' later that morning near Piquet Carneiro station. Many were trapped in the wreckage; the local medical staff were overwhelmed and a shortage of equipment meant that carpenters saws were used to perform amputations without anaesthetic to free them.

A monument to the victims of the disaster was erected at the scene of the accident by the local church with the support of the town authorities; it was restored in 2009.
