= Rzepin train disaster =

Polish train disaster

The Rzepin train disaster was an alleged railway disaster reported to have occurred near Rzepin, Poland, on 9 July 1952. According to some reports, about 160 Soviet soldiers died in the accident.

The incident was not confirmed by official Polish or Soviet sources, but was reported by Western press agencies. The day after the crash the West German Deutsche Presse-Agentur cited "unanimous reports" from "independent eye-witnesses". The following week the Associated Press in Berlin cited "well-authenticated reports reaching Allied officials" there, and the United Press Associations named the West Berlin Railway Workers Union as a source, along with "allied authorities".

The incident is said to have happened on the east side of the Oder river, between Boczow and Rzepin.

== Events ==
The train was a "Blue Express" travelling through Poland on the Frankfurt Oder to Brest-Litovsk leg of the Berlin to Moscow route. It was carrying Red Army troops on leave to Russia. It left the tracks and crashed into a lake.

== Cause ==
According to Allied sources as reported by the Associated Press, the accident was caused by an unnamed high-ranking officer (a general) loading his automobile on a flatcar in the middle of the train, against the advice of railway staff. The train consequently derailed on a curved section of track, and fell into a lake.

Robert A.D. Ford, a diplomat at the Canadian embassy in Moscow, travelled the line the following week and saw a heavy military and police presence at stations en route. He attributed this to the disaster being blamed on Polish guerrillas. This cause was also cited by the United Press agency, which stated "Allied officials" had received reports that anti-communist Polish Partisans had sabotaged the tracks.

The Blue Express train, which was used by Soviet officials, had previously featured in accusations by the Soviets of attempted anti-communist sabotage. From 20 July 1952, the CIA noted that the Blue Express was rerouted through Czechoslovakia, possibly due to sabotage activity in Poland.

== Memorial ==
In 2009, an initiative to erect a monument in honor of the victims was made, but due to the lack of confirmation of the authenticity of the accident, the initiative was not implemented.

== See also ==
- Nowy Dwór Mazowiecki train disaster, another train disaster in Poland that was not confirmed by Polish authorities.
