= Kew Gardens train crash =

1950 accident in Queens, New York, US

Details
- Date: November 22, 1950; 75 years ago 6:29 pm
- Location: Kew Gardens, Queens, New York City
- Coordinates: 40°42′17″N 73°49′33″W
- Country: United States
- Line: Main Line (LIRR)
- Operator: Long Island Rail Road
- Incident type: Collision
- Cause: Brakeman's and driver's errors

Statistics
- Trains: 2
- Passengers: 2,200
- Deaths: 78
- Injured: 363

The Kew Gardens train crash (also known as the Richmond Hill disaster) was a collision between two trains on the Long Island Rail Road's Main Line, which occurred during the evening rush hour of November 22, 1950. The trains collided between Kew Gardens and Jamaica stations in Kew Gardens, Queens, New York City, killing 78 people and injuring 363. The crash is the worst railway accident in LIRR history, and one of the worst in the history of New York State.

== Background ==
An eastbound Hempstead-bound train consisting of 12 cars and carrying about 1,000 passengers left Pennsylvania Station at 6:09 p.m. Its first stop was to be Jamaica, but as it passed the Kew Gardens station, the train's engineer applied the air brakes to reduce speed to 15 miles per hour (24 km/h) in response to a "Go Slow" signal. Once engaged, the brakes would not release, and the train halted. While the engineer investigated the problem, the brakeman, traveling in the rear car, got out and held a red lantern to warn any train following, as per the regulations. He then heard the traction motors power; believing that the brakes were now working and that the train was about to depart, he turned off the lantern and re-boarded the rear car. He had not received a signal by the train's whistle to return to the train. The brakes were still locked on and the Hempstead-bound train remained where it was, in the dark, without any protection from the rear.

Four minutes after the Hempstead train departed Penn Station, a train bound for Babylon station carrying 1,200 passengers departed Penn Station on the same track. When the Babylon train came around the bend 4,600 feet (1,400 m) behind the Hempstead train, it slowed to 15 mph (24 km/h) in response to a "Go Slow" signal indicating congestion ahead. The engineer then saw the next signal beyond the stopped train, which showed "All Clear"; thinking that this applied to him he accelerated to 35 mph (56 km/h).

== Collision ==
Meanwhile, the brakeman on the Hempstead train signaled to his engineer that he was back aboard and the train could proceed, but he did not receive any response; he signaled again but the train stayed where it was. He prepared to get back onto the track when the Babylon train hit. Before he was killed the Babylon train's engineer applied the emergency brake but it was still travelling at 30 mph (48 km/h) when it collided with the stationary train. Neither train derailed; the impact pushed the stationary train forward 75 feet (23 m) and split its last car lengthwise as the front car of the Babylon train telescoped into it, shearing off the superstructure above the floor and driving the roof 15 feet (4.6 m) into the air.

In the ensuing collision, 78 people were killed (including everyone aboard the last car of the Hempstead train, who were crushed by the impact of the Babylon train) and 363 were injured. One witness described the dead as "packed like sardines in their own blood". A survivor recounted: "All I could see was parts of bodies, arms and legs protruding from the windows". Many of those who survived the impact were trapped in the darkness, unable to move in the pileup of dead bodies, amidst the screams and wails of the dying.

== Response ==
In the aftermath of the crash, all of the police detectives on duty in Queens were summoned to the site, as were 200 physicians coming from every hospital in the borough. Police and fire personnel cut through the wreckage with torches, and used ladders to allow doctors and nurses to provide medical aid for those trapped inside. Emergency responders were also summoned from other boroughs. It was more than five hours before the last people still alive were removed from the wreckage.

== Aftermath ==
A four-way investigation was quickly convened after the Kew Gardens collision. The official cause of the crash was determined to be the disregard of the "Go Slow" signal by the Babylon train's engineer, who died in the crash. He had instead reacted to the "All Clear" signal half a mile ahead. The brakeman of the Hempstead train was also criticized for leaving his train unprotected during the critical moments.

The accident happened only nine months after another crash involving LIRR trains at Rockville Centre killed 32 people. The LIRR had suffered from years of underinvestment, as the cars involved in this crash were built during the 1910s and their ages were typical of the fleet's as a whole. The New York Public Service Commission had prevented the LIRR from increasing fares between 1918 and 1947, despite the railroad's increased operating costs. At the time of the accident, the LIRR had already filed for bankruptcy reorganization.

On November 25, Governor Thomas E. Dewey of New York appointed New York City’s construction coordinator Robert Moses, former Secretary of War Robert P. Patterson and former Justice Charles C. Lockwood on the Temporary Long Island Railroad Commission to conduct a "sweeping study" into all aspects of the railroad’s problems "in order to make it a safe, sound and efficient means of transportation." The Commission issued its preliminary report on January 20, 1951, recommending state purchase and operation by non-profit public authority of the railway service. Dewey, however, opted for active state involvement in order to reorganize the bankrupt railroad and grant tax and other concessions to keep it continuing under private ownership under a Long Island Authority, provided that it would be able to attract new investments. Otherwise, as a last resort, the authority should have the power to acquire and operate the railroad.

In an other investigative report published in response to the crash, the Public Service Commission found that fatigue and a lack of proper crew procedures were elements in both the Rockville Centre and Kew Gardens crashes. The commission suggested six improvements that could be made to the LIRR, including signal improvements and automatic train control. After the crash, the LIRR began a $6 million program to install Automatic Speed Control (ASC) on its tracks. The first segment of ASC went into service in May 1951. The Pennsylvania Railroad (the then-owner of the LIRR) terminated the bankruptcy and began a 12-year improvement program at a cost of $58 million. The LIRR was exempted from much of its tax burden and gained freedom to charge realistic fares. Ultimately, the LIRR became reorganized as part of the Metropolitan Transportation Authority, which was formed to manage the LIRR and still operates it.

== See also ==
- 1950 in rail transport
- List of American railroad accidents
- List of disasters in New York City by death toll
- 1882 Spuyten Duyvil train wreck, another rear-end collision in New York City caused by signaling error.
