= Rockville Centre station =

Long Island Rail Road station in Nassau County, New York

Rockville Centre
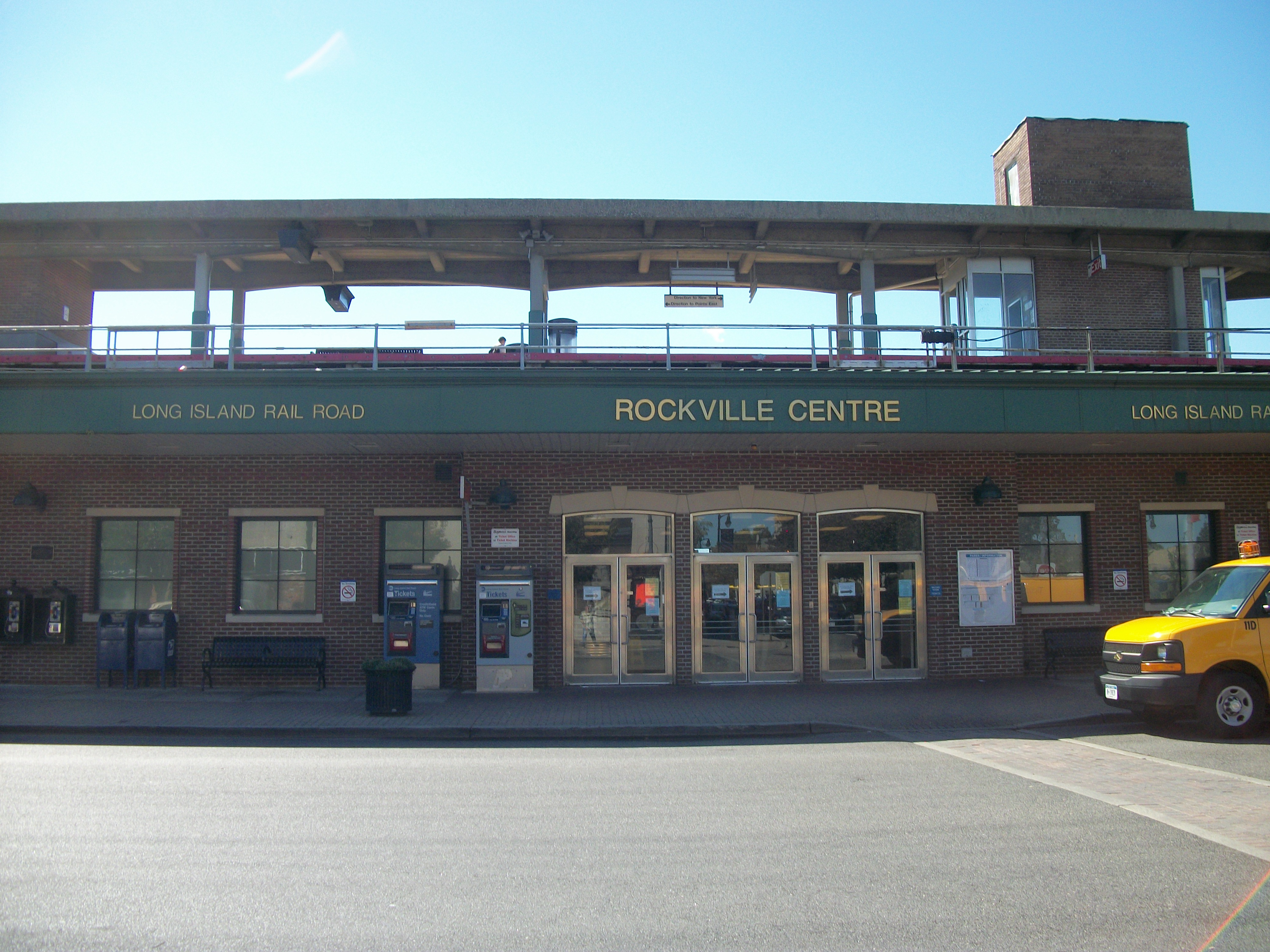
- The Rockville Centre station's main entrance, along Front Street

General information
- Location: North Village Avenue & Front Street; Rockville Centre, New York
- Coordinates: 40.6583°N 73.6466°W
- Owner: Long Island Rail Road
- Line: Montauk Branch
- Distance: 19.3 mi (31.1 km) from Long Island City
- Platforms: 1 island platform
- Tracks: 2
- Connections: Nassau Inter-County Express: n4, n15, n16, n16C, n31x, Mercy Medical Community Shuttle

Construction
- Parking: Yes
- Cycle facilities: Yes
- Accessible: Yes

Other information
- Station code: RVC
- Fare zone: 7

History
- Opened: 1867; 159 years ago (SSRRLI)
- Rebuilt: 1881, 1901, 1950
- Electrified: May 20, 1925; 750 V (DC) third rail

Passengers
- 2012—2014: 7,530 per weekday
- Rank: 12 of 125

Services
Preceding station	Long Island Rail Road	Following station
Lynbrook toward Penn Station, Grand Central or Atlantic Terminal	Babylon Branch	Baldwin toward Babylon
Montauk Branch does not stop here
Former services
Preceding station	Long Island Rail Road	Following station
Lynbrook toward Long Island City	Montauk Division	Baldwin toward Montauk
Location

Rockville Centre (co-signed as Molloy University) is a station along the Babylon Branch of the Long Island Rail Road in Rockville Centre, Nassau County, New York. It is officially located at North Village Avenue and Front Street, north of Sunrise Highway (NY 27) – but the station property spreads west to North Center Avenue and east to North Park Avenue.

Parking for the Rockville Centre station is available around the station for those with residential and non-residential permits issued by the Village of Rockville Centre. The station is east of the former Rockville Centre Bus Depot, and is located roughly 21.1 miles (34.0 km) away from Penn Station.

== History ==
=== Early history ===
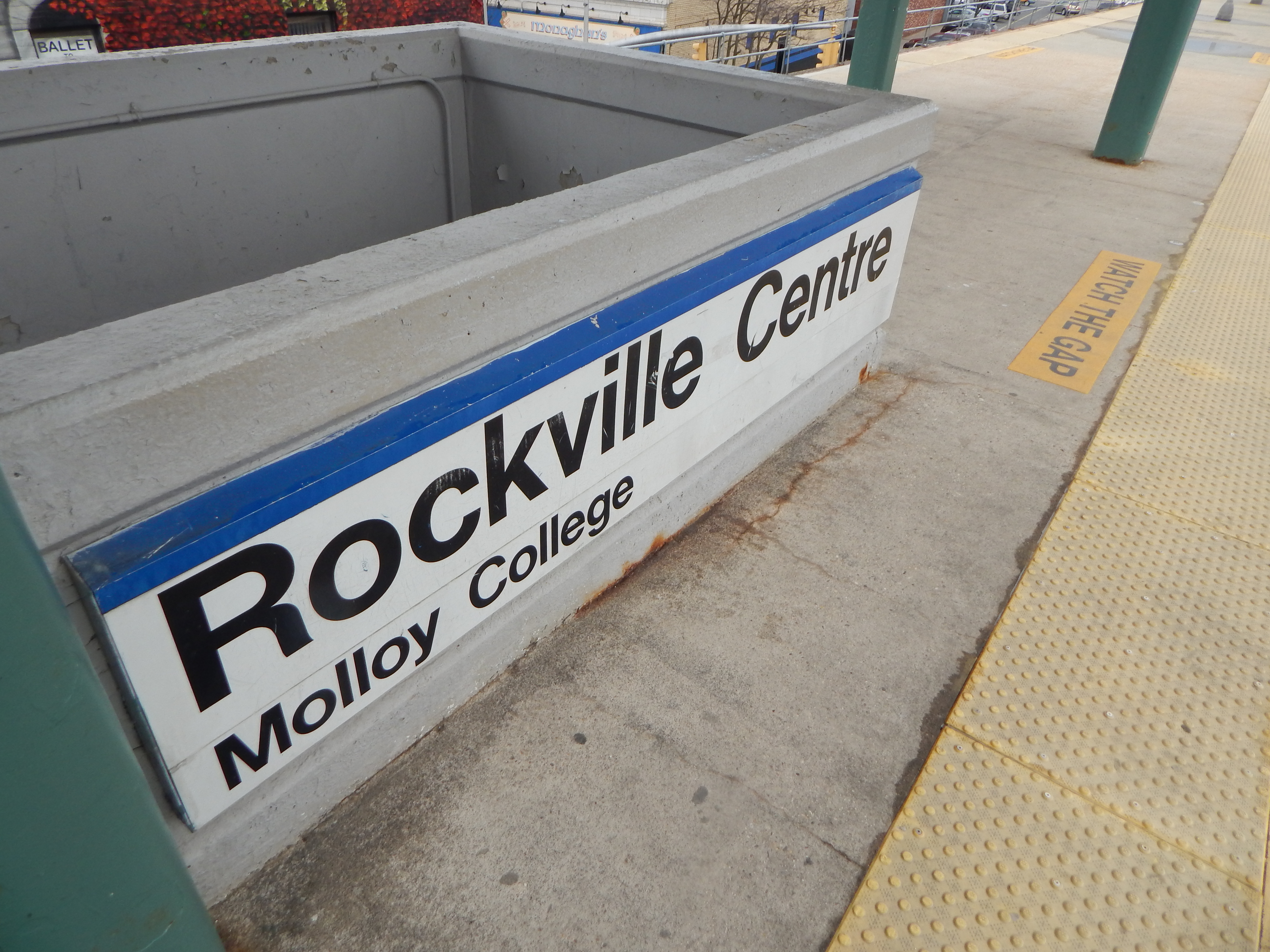
A sign on the station's platform

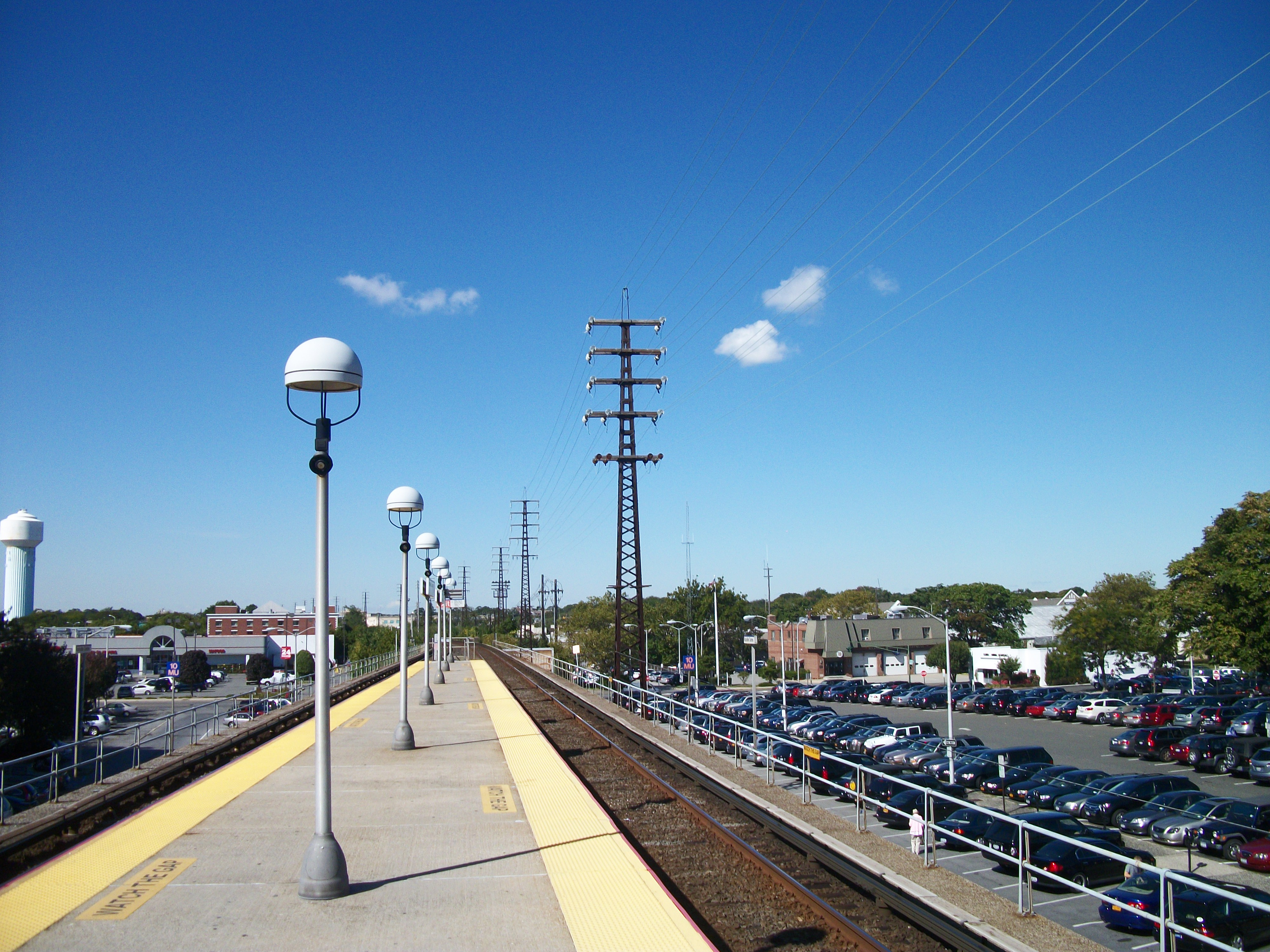
The exposed, western end of the station's platform

Rockville Centre station was originally built by the South Side Railroad of Long Island on September 23, 1867 and remodeled in July 1881. The station was rebuilt in 1901; the new depot opened on October 14 of that year. The original station was moved to a private location that year and razed in 2004.

=== Grade crossing elimination project ===
The second station was razed in 1949, as the first major phase of a project to elevate the Babylon Branch and eliminate its level crossings was completed. A temporary station was built southeast of the former location and began operation on April 19, 1949.

Rockville Centre station was the site of a major railroad accident on February 17, 1950 that resulted in the deaths of 32 people, and serious injury of over 100 people. This occurred nine months before a similar accident in Kew Gardens, Queens that killed 79 people, and injured hundreds more. The current elevated structure was opened on July 17–18, 1950.

=== Station renovation ===
On August 2, 1982, work began on a $1.2 million project to extend the platform from 800 to 1,000 feet (240 to 300 m) to accommodate 12-car trains. The concrete platform at the station would be completely replaced. The project was to be done in multiple phases, and was scheduled to be completed in October 1983. As part of the project, the bathrooms and waiting room at the station were repainted, the stairway to the west of the lower level waiting room was replaced, and a new stairway would be built at the far western end of the platform. In addition, an elevator was to be constructed at the station. In August 1983, the LIRR awarded the contract to construct the new stairway. A dedication ceremony for the project took place on January 25, 1984. At that time, the elevator was slated to be completed in spring 1984.

In March 1985, the contract for the new stairway was cancelled since the manufacturer did not provide any design drawings. The contract was rebid and was awarded again in August 1985, with an estimated cost of $30,000. At the same time, the only existing staircase at the western end of the station had been removed, and would not be replaced until October 1985. Since the LIRR was unable to reduce the six-to-seven-month time period needed to fabricated the stairs, it was not able to get them installed by November 1985, and set a new completion date of February 1, 1986. In January 1986, work began on the installation of the new western stairway, but stopped after two days as the LIRR said the manufacturer made measurement mistakes. Work resumed later that month, and was expected to be completed by the end of the month.

== Station layout ==
The station has one 12-car-long high-level island platform between the two tracks.

P

Platform level

Track 1
← Babylon Branch toward Atlantic Terminal, Grand Central Madison, or Penn Station (Lynbrook)

← Montauk Branch does not stop here

Island platform, doors will open on the left or right
Track 2
Babylon Branch toward Babylon (Baldwin) →

Montauk Branch does not stop here →

G
Ground level
Exit/entrance, parking, and buses

== In popular culture ==
Though some scenes from the 2004 movie Eternal Sunshine of the Spotless Mind took place at Rockville Centre station, they were actually shot at Mount Vernon East station on the Metro-North Railroad New Haven Line.

== See also ==
- List of Long Island Rail Road stations
- Rockville Centre train crash
