= Rockville Centre train crash =

1950 accident on the Long Island Rail Road

Details
- Date: February 17, 1950; 76 years ago 10:43 p.m.
- Location: Rockville Centre, New York
- Coordinates: 40°39′30″N 73°39′08″W
- Country: United States
- Line: Montauk Branch
- Operator: Long Island Rail Road
- Incident type: Collision
- Cause: Signal passed at danger

Statistics
- Trains: 2
- Passengers: 800+
- Deaths: 32
- Injured: 76–158

On February 17, 1950, two Long Island Rail Road trains collided on the Montauk Branch just west of Rockville Centre station in Rockville Centre, New York, killing 32 and injuring several dozen more. At the time, it was the deadliest collision in the railroad's history until the Kew Gardens train crash later that year. The crash was a head-on collision involving two trains, which were running along the same gauntlet track due to construction.

== Background ==
At the time of the crash, the Montauk Branch was undergoing a program to eliminate grade crossings, where the roadway and track intersected at the same elevation. A new elevated viaduct was being constructed just north of the original at-grade railroad line's right-of-way. As a result, the original line's right-of-way narrowed to one gauntlet track shared by both westbound and eastbound trains for about 2 miles (3.2 km), located partly on a curve. At the gauntlet track, the two tracks ran parallel on a single track bed; the pairs of tracks overlapped, so only one pair of rails were able to be used at a time. There was a signal west of Banks Avenue for eastbound trains, and train traffic movements into the gauntlet track were controlled by a dispatcher at Rockville Centre station. In addition, at the time the Rockville Centre station was undergoing reconstruction, and a temporary platform had been set up for trains in both directions east of the old station, at North Park Avenue.

Eastbound Babylon-bound train #78, driven by Jacob Kiefer, consisted of 12 cars carrying about 800 passengers. It left Pennsylvania Station at 10:03 p.m. EST and was due to arrive at Rockville Centre at 10:36. It passed through the red signal at Banks Avenue at 10:35 and began to slow down.

Westbound Penn Station-bound train #175, driven by J.W. Markin, left Babylon at 9:58 p.m. By the time it approached Rockville Centre it was traveling at 30 miles per hour (48 km/h). Both trains were traveling along the gauntlet track. Had train #175 been traveling faster, it could have passed through the gauntlet track before train #78 entered the gauntlet track, thus avoiding the collision.

== Collision ==
The collision occurred at 10:43 p.m. EST, along the gauntlet track, between Merrick Road and Banks Avenue. Because the trains ran on the right side of the gauntlet track, the left sides of both trains were more heavily damaged. The force of the crash had split the first car of the westbound train in half.

Initial reports stated that 20 people had been killed. The New York Times reported that "one of the cars was virtually torn apart", and that dead bodies were piled five-deep in the leading cars of each train. In the final victim count, 32 people were killed. Of these, 29 died at the scene and three died later at the hospital. The front cars in both trains, usually reserved for smokers as per LIRR policy, were more crowded than the trailing cars, thus contributing to the high death toll. In addition, at least 76 were injured, though an injury count of up to 158 has been recorded.

== Response ==
First responders came from between 20 and 30 miles (32 and 48 km) away. Every firefighter and police officer in Lynbrook and Rockville Centre was summoned to the site of the crash. Two hours after the collision, only six bodies had been extracted from the wreckage, and many of the injured were still trapped. To prevent rescue workers from being electrocuted, the LIRR cut power to the gauntlet track's third rails after receiving reports of the crash. In total, 250 doctors and 450 firefighters and LIRR emergency workers responded to the crash, along with numerous volunteers. The injured were transported to nearby hospitals such as South Nassau Communities Hospital, which became overcrowded as a result. Five months later, two patients were still in the hospital.

Because many movie theaters were playing films at the time of the crash, there were thousands of people in the vicinity. As these films concluded, many of these moviegoers and others went to see the crash. Police officers estimated that by one hour after the crash, there were 30,000 people near the wreck, many of whom attempted to observe from several miles away. A temporary morgue was set up at the Second Baptist Church on Banks Avenue.

== Aftermath ==
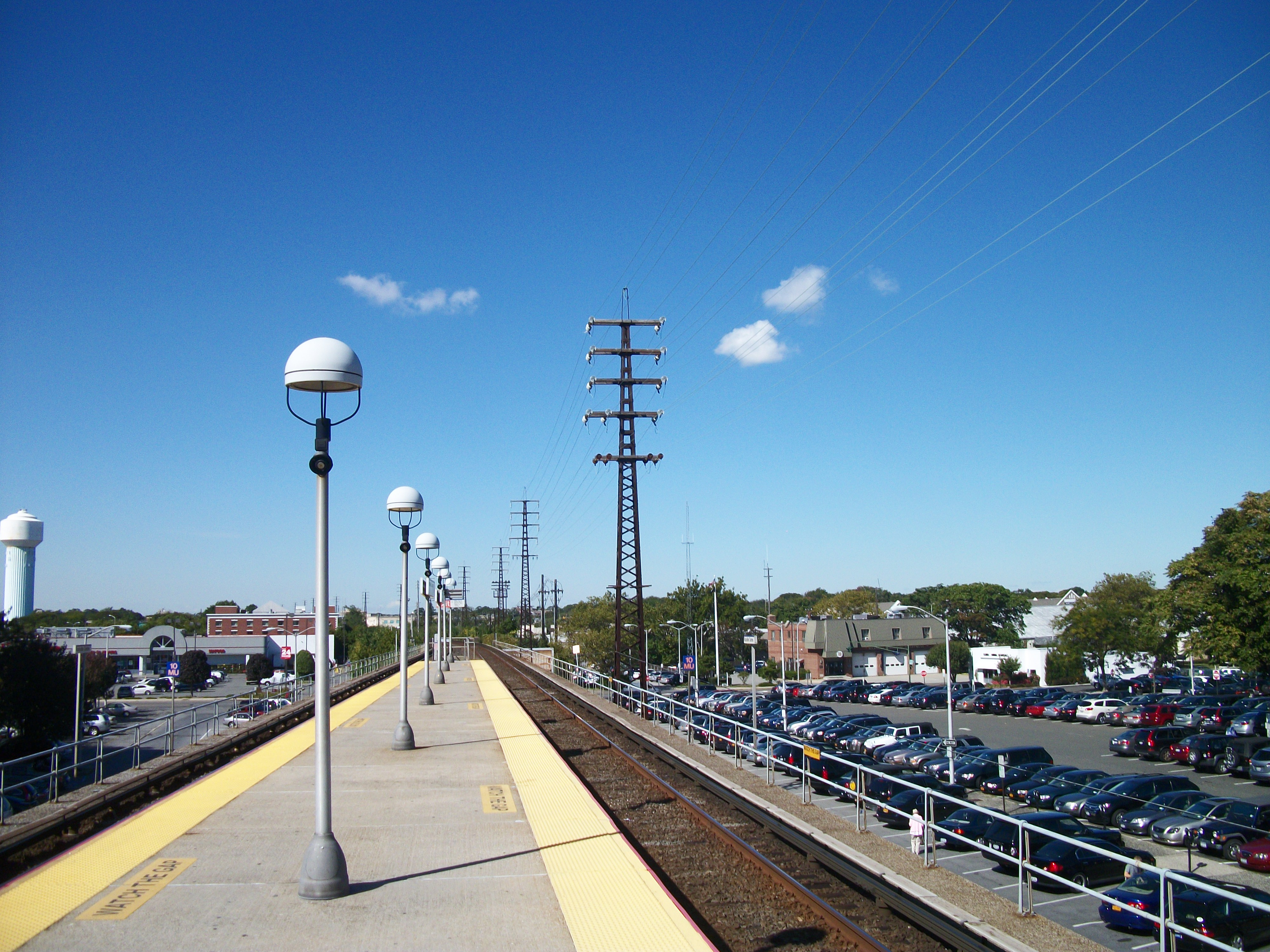
The elevated LIRR viaduct that opened five months after the crash

After the crash, two inquiries were made into the causes of the collision. Kiefer was placed under arrest at his home, while Markin was questioned and then released by police. Kiefer was arraigned, then released on bail, on February 21.

The mayor of Rockville Centre called for automatic train control systems to be installed. At a New York Public Service Commission hearing less than a week later, the LIRR offered to install train stop devices at the entrances to the gauntlet track, which would derail trains if they passed the red signals. Concurrently, a Nassau County grand jury was considering a charge of negligence against Kiefer.

The elevated viaduct near the crash site opened on July 17, 1950, exactly five months after the crash. The completion of the segment of elevated viaduct also included the opening of a new elevated Rockville Centre station. 7,000 people attended the opening ceremony, including 2,000 residents of Rockville Centre.

Kiefer, who had worked for the LIRR for 27 years, was suspended from the LIRR without pay and faced a criminal trial after the collision. Were he to be convicted, he could have been sentenced to no more than 15 years in prison. At the trial, Markin alleged that Kiefer had passed the red signal west of Banks Avenue, even though Markin's train had the right of way. Kiefer argued that he had lost consciousness in the moments leading up to the crash due to hypertension, and that he had lost alertness soon after passing Lynbrook station. His defense attorneys stated that the gauntlet track was dangerous because it forced two trains to share the same right-of-way. On September 27, 1950, he was declared not guilty of all charges.

=== Kew Gardens train crash ===
The Kew Gardens train crash, which occurred only nine months later, killed 78 people and injured 363, surpassing the Rockville Centre crash as the deadliest crash in LIRR history. This crash was also caused by a motorman overrunning a red signal. The two incidents, combined, killed over 100 riders and resulted in renewed scrutiny of the LIRR's infrastructure. At the time of the two crashes, the LIRR had suffered from years of underinvestment, as most cars were built during the 1910s. The company had been prevented from increasing fares between 1918 and 1947 by the Public Service Commission, despite increased operating costs. In 1950, the LIRR had already filed for bankruptcy reorganization.

In an investigative report published in response to the Rockville Centre crash, the Public Service Commission found that fatigue and a lack of proper crew procedures were elements in both the Rockville Centre and Kew Gardens crashes. The commission suggested six improvements that could be made to the LIRR, including signal improvements and automatic train control. After the crash, the LIRR began a $6 million program to install Automatic Speed Control (ASC) on its tracks. The first segment of ASC went into service in May 1951. The Pennsylvania Railroad (the then-owner of the LIRR) terminated the bankruptcy and began a 12-year improvement program at a cost of $58 million. The LIRR was exempted from much of its tax burden and gained freedom to charge realistic fares. Ultimately, the LIRR became reorganized as part of the Metropolitan Transportation Authority, which was formed to manage the LIRR and still operates it.
