= Piquet Carneiro =

Municipality in Ceará, Brazil

Coordinates: 5°48′S 39°25′W

- Municipality
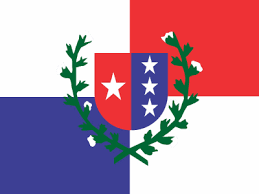
- Flag
- Interactive map of Piquet Carneiro
- Country: Brazil
- Region: Nordeste
- State: Ceará
- Mesoregion: Sertoes Cearenses

Population (2020)
  - Total: 17,086
- Time zone: UTC−3 (BRT)

Piquet Carneiro is a municipality in the state of Ceará in the Northeast region of Brazil.

== See also ==
- List of municipalities in Ceará
