= Telangana Express =

Train in India

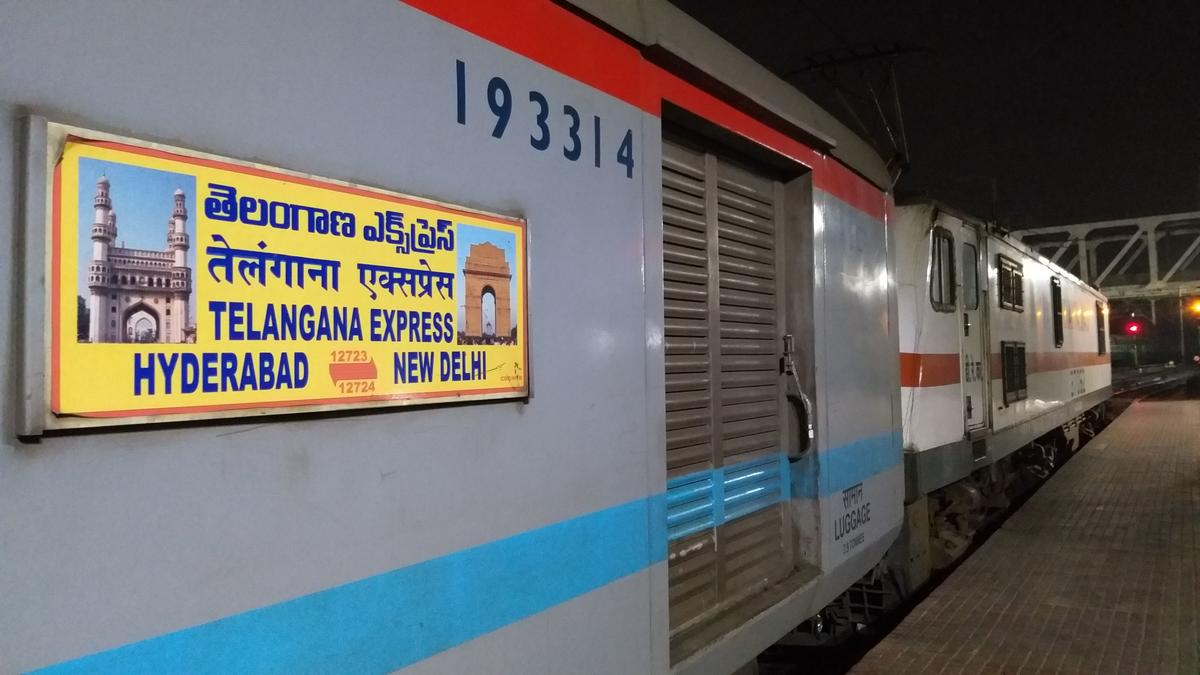
- Telangana Express At Secunderabad Railway Station

Overview
- Service type: Superfast
- Locale: Telangana, Maharashtra, Madhya Pradesh, Rajasthan, Uttar Pradesh, Haryana & Delhi
- Predecessor: Andhra Pradesh Express (Old Name)
- First service: 3 October 1976; 50 years ago
- Current operator: South Central Railway

Route
- Termini: Hyderabad Deccan (HYB); New Delhi (NDLS)
- Stops: 16
- Distance travelled: 1,677 km (1,042 mi)
- Average journey time: 25 hours 50 minutes
- Service frequency: Daily
- Train number: 12723 / 12724

On-board services
- Classes: AC First Class, AC 2 Tier, AC 3 Tier, Sleeper Class, General Unreserved
- Seating arrangements: Yes
- Sleeping arrangements: Yes
- Catering facilities: Available
- Observation facilities: Large windows
- Baggage facilities: Available
- Other facilities: Below the seats

Technical
- Rolling stock: LHB coach
- Track gauge: 1,676 mm (5 ft 6 in)
- Operating speed: 65 km/h (40 mph) average with halts
Route map
- Telangana Express Route Map

The Telangana Express (Train numbers 12723 / 12724) is a Superfast Express of South Central Railways that runs between Hyderabad, capital of Telangana and national capital of India, New Delhi. It starts from Hyderabad Deccan Nampally and terminates at New Delhi.

== History ==
Until 1973 only two out of the four southern capitals had direct rail connectivity to the national capital. One is 15/16 Grand Trunk Express from Madras and another is 21/22 Southern Express (today's Dakshin Express) from Hyderabad since 1955. The New Train 123/124 Andhra Pradesh Express (Now Telangana Express) was introduced on 3 October 1976, from Secunderabad to New Delhi and inaugurated by Madhu Dandavate who served as Minister of Railways.

It was called as Blue Bullet due to its unique livery in Oxford Blue colour coaches with a gold band in 1976. After the Formation of Telangana State, Andhra Pradesh Express has been renamed as Telangana Express with effect from 15 November 2015. Telangana express was updated with brand new German design Linke-Hofmann-Busch coaches, replacing the ICF coach design CBC coaches from 15 July 2019.

== Schedule and service ==
The train passes through the states of Telangana, Maharashtra, Madhya Pradesh, Rajasthan, Uttar Pradesh, Haryana and Delhi.

== Route and halts ==
- Hyderabad Deccan
- Secunderabad
- Kazipet Junction
- Ramagundam
- Mancherial
- Bellampalli
- Sirpur Kaghaznagar
- Balharshah
- Nagpur Junction
- Itarsi Junction
- Bhopal Junction
- Virangna Laxmibai Jhansi Junction
- Gwalior Junction
- Agra Cantonment
- Mathura Junction
- Hazrat Nizamuddin
- New Delhi

== Traction ==
It is hauled by a Lallaguda Loco Shed based WAP-7 electric locomotive from end to end.

== Gallery ==
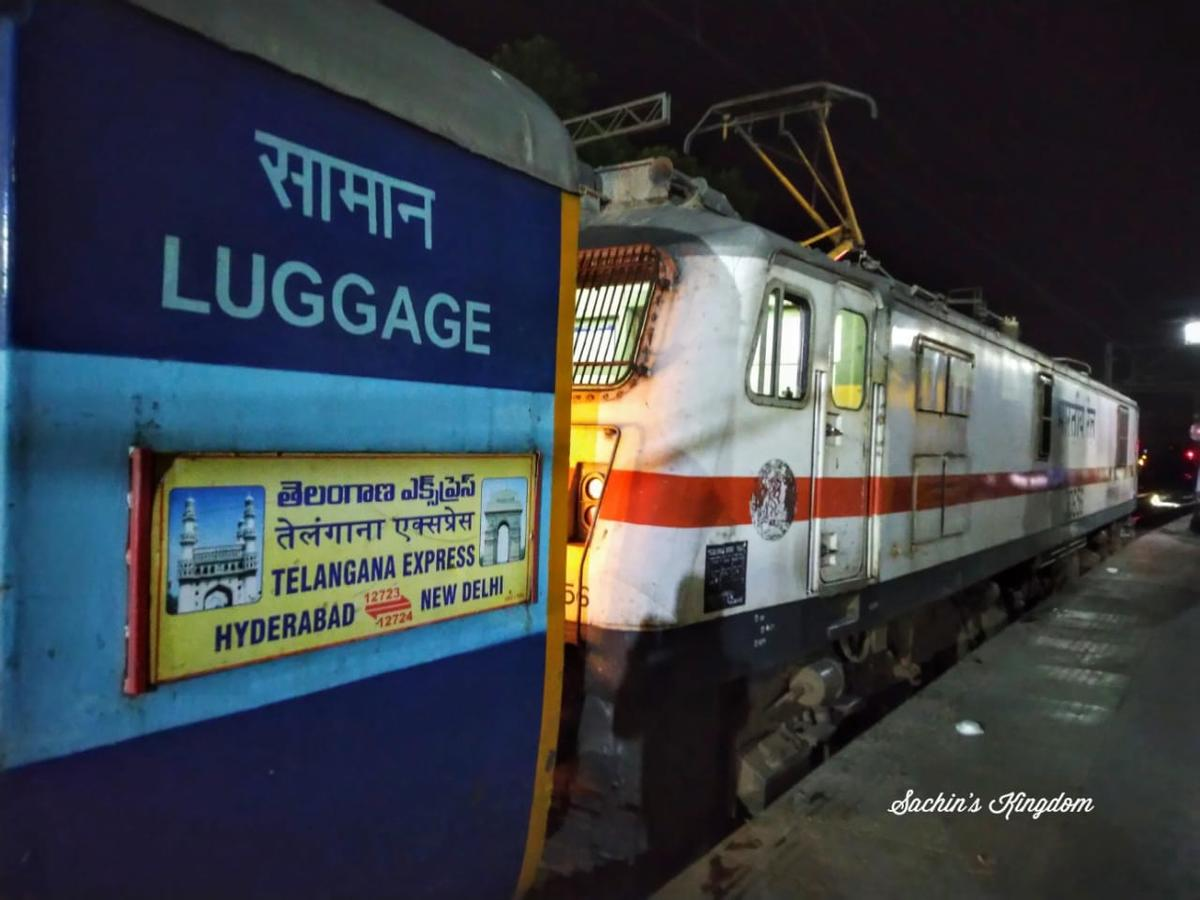
Departing Jhansi Junction

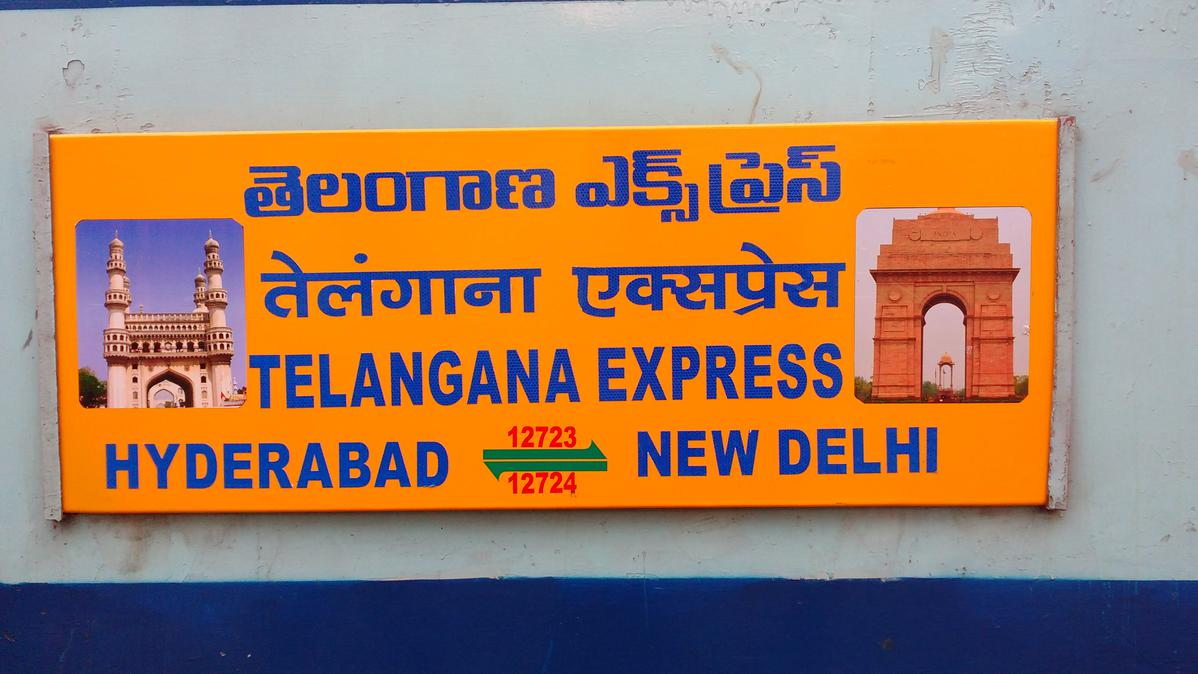

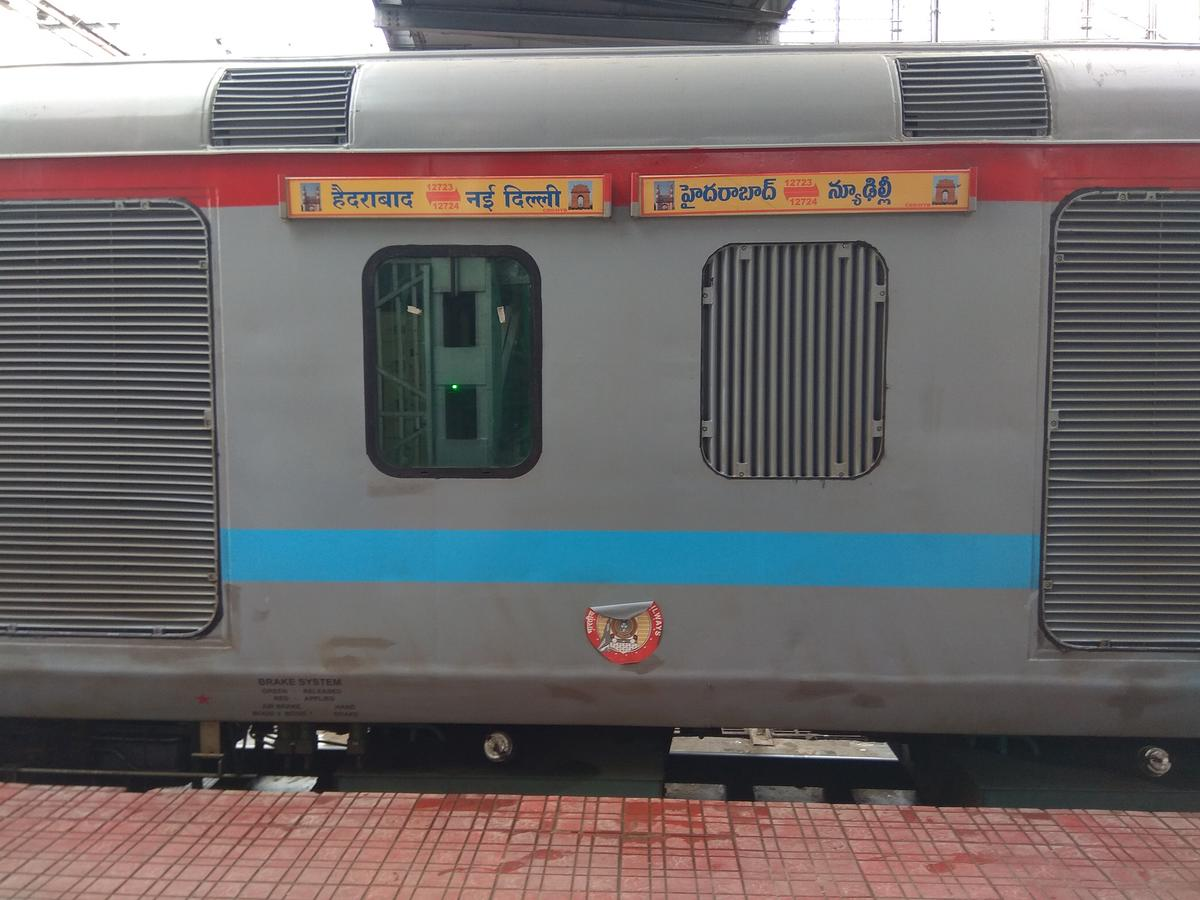
Generator Car

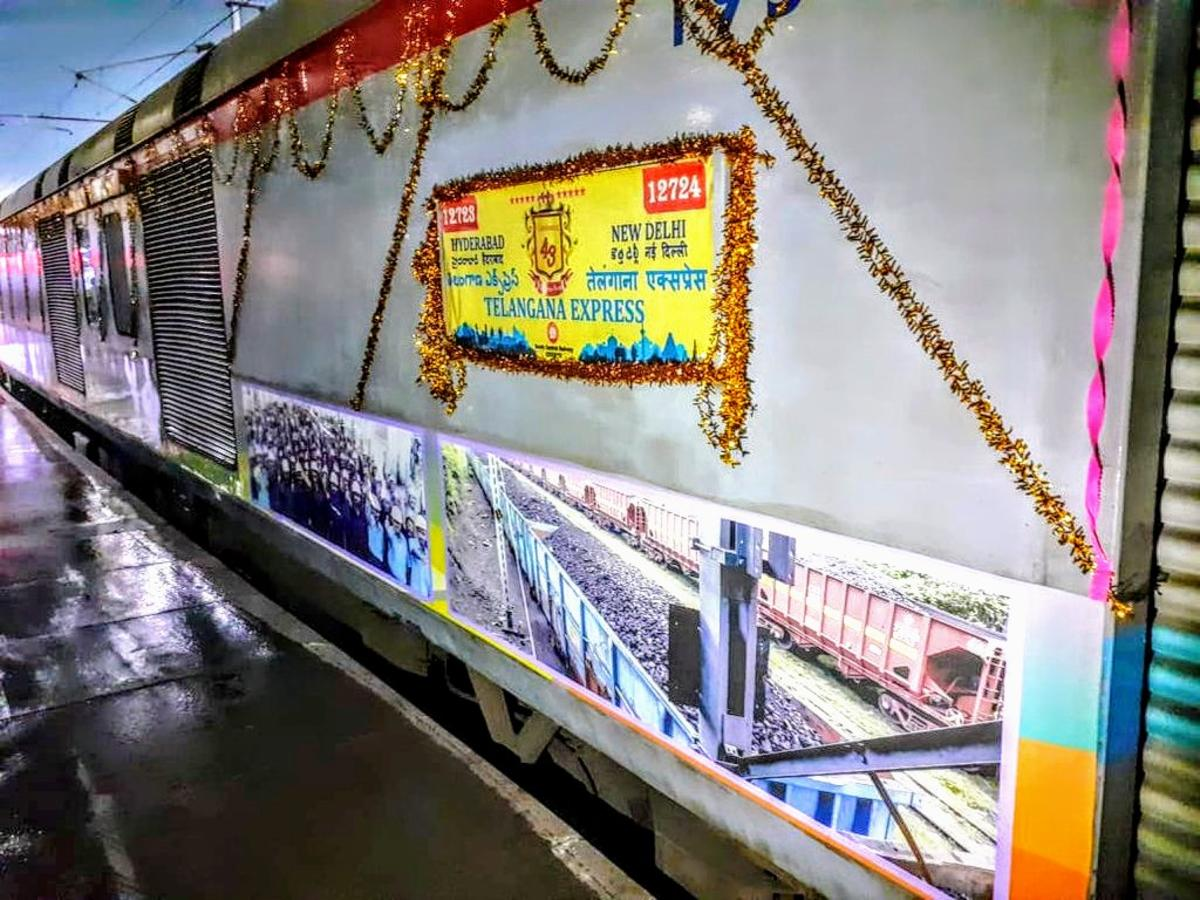
45 Year celebration Board

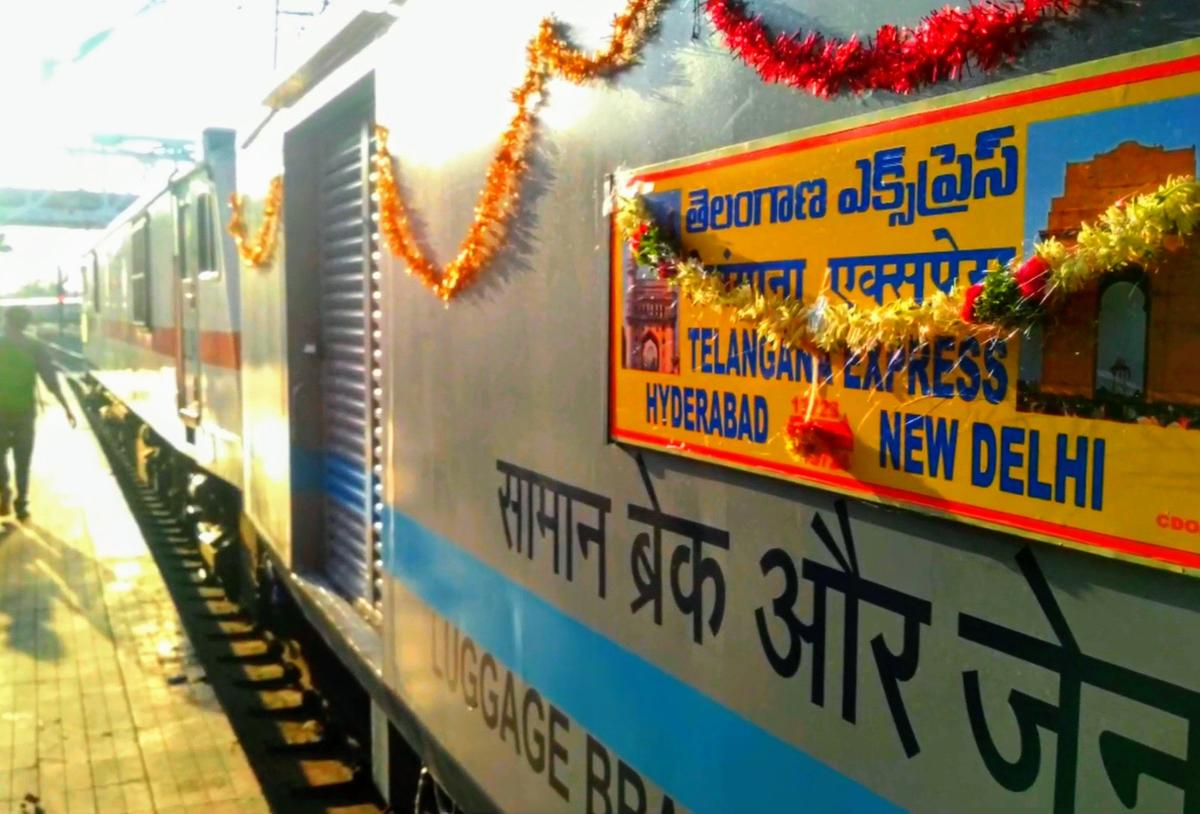
First LHB Run

== See also ==
- List of named passenger trains of India
- Hyderabad Deccan railway station
- New Delhi railway station
