= Dornakal Junction railway station =

Railway station in Telangana, India

Dornakal Junction
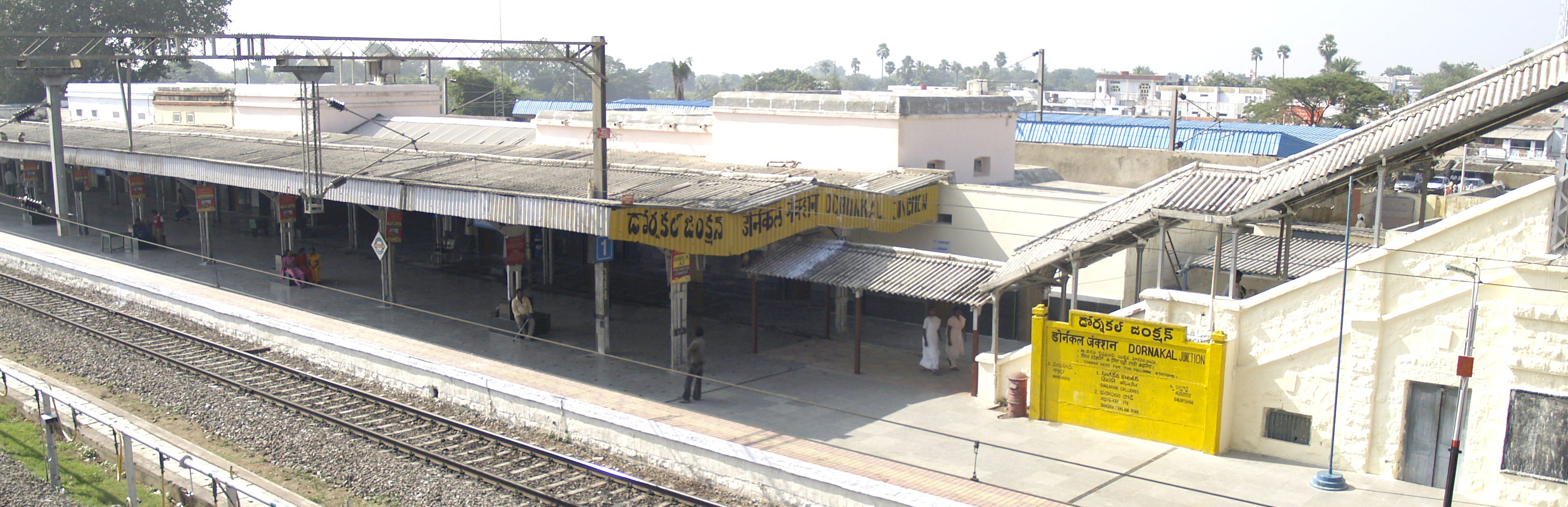

General information
- Location: Dornakal, Mahabubabad district, Telangana; India
- Coordinates: 17°15′53″N 80°05′27″E
- System: Indian Railways Station
- Owner: Indian Railways
- Operator: Secunderabad railway division
- Line: Vijayawada–Kazipet line (Dornakal–Manuguru)
- Platforms: 4

Construction
- Structure type: Standard (on-ground station)

Other information
- Status: Active
- Station code: DKJ
- Fare zone: South Central Railway
Location
- Location within Telangana Location within India

Dornakal Junction railway station (station code: DKJ) is in the South Central Railway zone of Indian Railways. It is 125 km. from Vijayawada in the state of Andhra Pradesh

== Overview ==
Most of the trains running on Kazipet–Vijayawada section pass through the station and serve 27000 passengers daily. There are about nine trains which start/pass from the station.

Train name	Type	End points
Krishna Express	Express	Tirupati Main−Adilabad
Gowthami Express	Express	Kakinada Port−Lingampalli
Andaman Express	Express	Chennai Central−Jammu Tawi
Golconda Express	Express	Guntur−Secunderabad
Charminar Express	Express	Hyderabad−Tambaram
Satavahana Express	Express	Vijayawada−Secunderabad
Guntur–Secunderabad Intercity Express	Intercity Express	Guntur−Secunderabad

Passenger MEMU and DEMU trains:

- Vijayawada–Bhadrachalam Passenger
- Manuguru–Kazipet Passenger
- Vijayawada–Dornakal Junction Passenger
- Vijayawada–Kazipet Passenger
