= Hyderabad–Mumbai Express =

Train in India

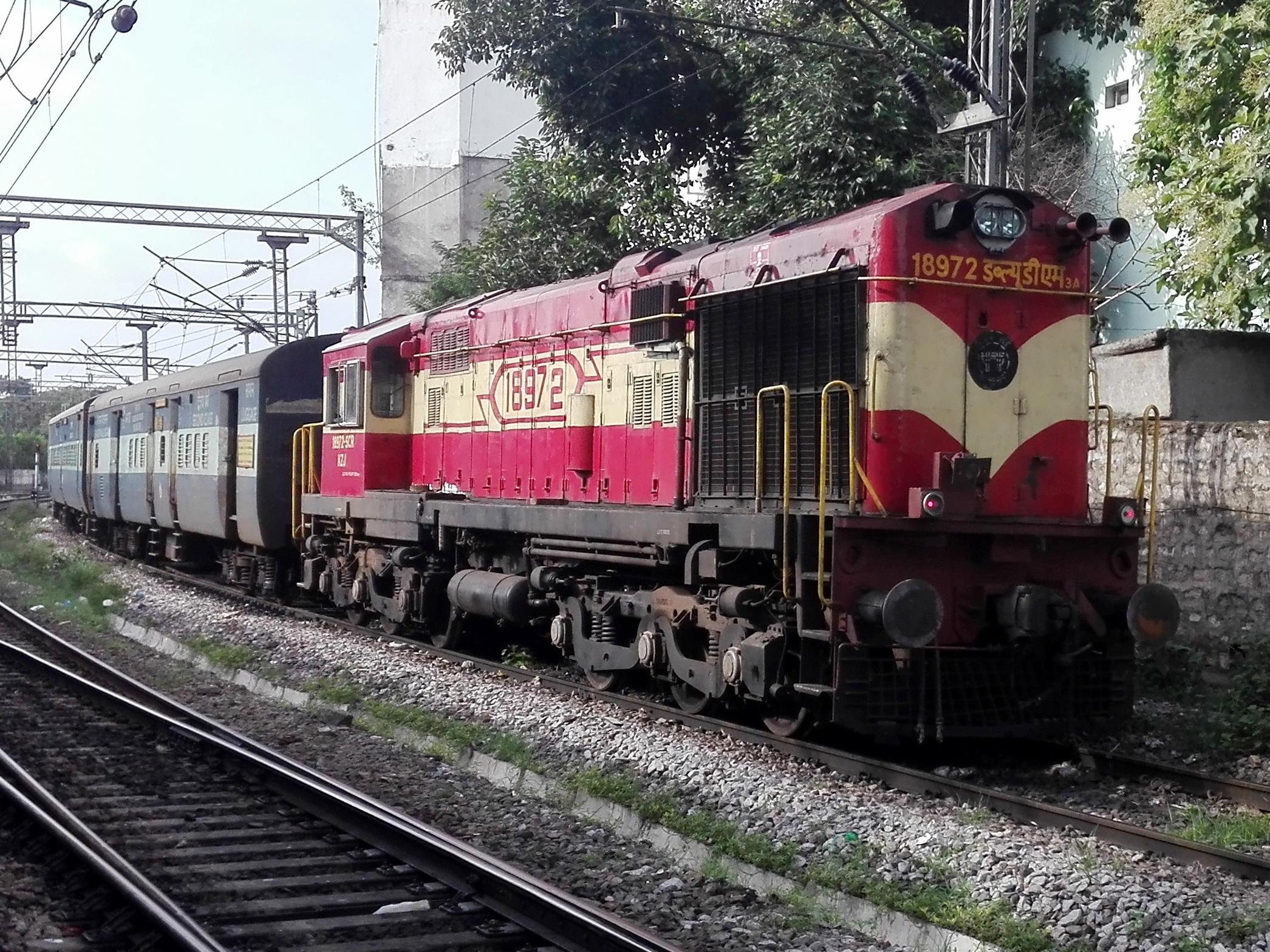
- Hyderabad–Mumbai express at Hyderabad in 2018

Overview
- Service type: Superfast Express
- Status: Running
- Locale: Telangana, Maharashtra
- First service: 1 October 1962; 64 years ago
- Current operator: South Central Railways

Route
- Termini: Hyderabad Deccan (HYB); Mumbai CSMT (CSMT)
- Stops: 22
- Distance travelled: 790 kilometres (490 mi)
- Average journey time: 14 hours 20 minutes
- Service frequency: Daily
- Train number: 22731 / 22732 (Previous: 17031/17032)

On-board services
- Classes: Sleeper, Air-conditioned and Unreserved
- Seating arrangements: Yes
- Sleeping arrangements: Yes
- Observation facilities: Large windows in all carriages
- Baggage facilities: Below the seats

Technical
- Track gauge: Indian gauge
- Electrification: Fully electrified

The Hyderabad–Mumbai Express, also known as the Mumbai Express, is a daily train between Hyderabad and Mumbai. The train shares the rakes of Hussainsagar Express and follows the same route, though the latter is a Superfast Express. From Oct 1, 2022, the train has been reclassified as a superfast express with numbers 22731 (Hyderabad–Mumbai) and 22732 (Mumbai–Hyderabad) and upgraded to LHB coaches on 3 February 2023.

The train departs from Hyderabad at 22:35 and reaches Mumbai at 13:05 PM. From Mumbai the train departs at 14:10 and reaches Hyderabad Deccan at 04:30 AM. This train makes a total of 22 halts including the destination points during the journey.

== Traction ==
As the route is fully electrified it is hauled by WAP-4 of Vijayawada Shed from end to end.

== See also ==
- Andhra Pradesh Express
- Andhra Pradesh Sampark Kranti Express
- Hussainsagar Express
