= Andhra Pradesh Express (old) =

Train in India

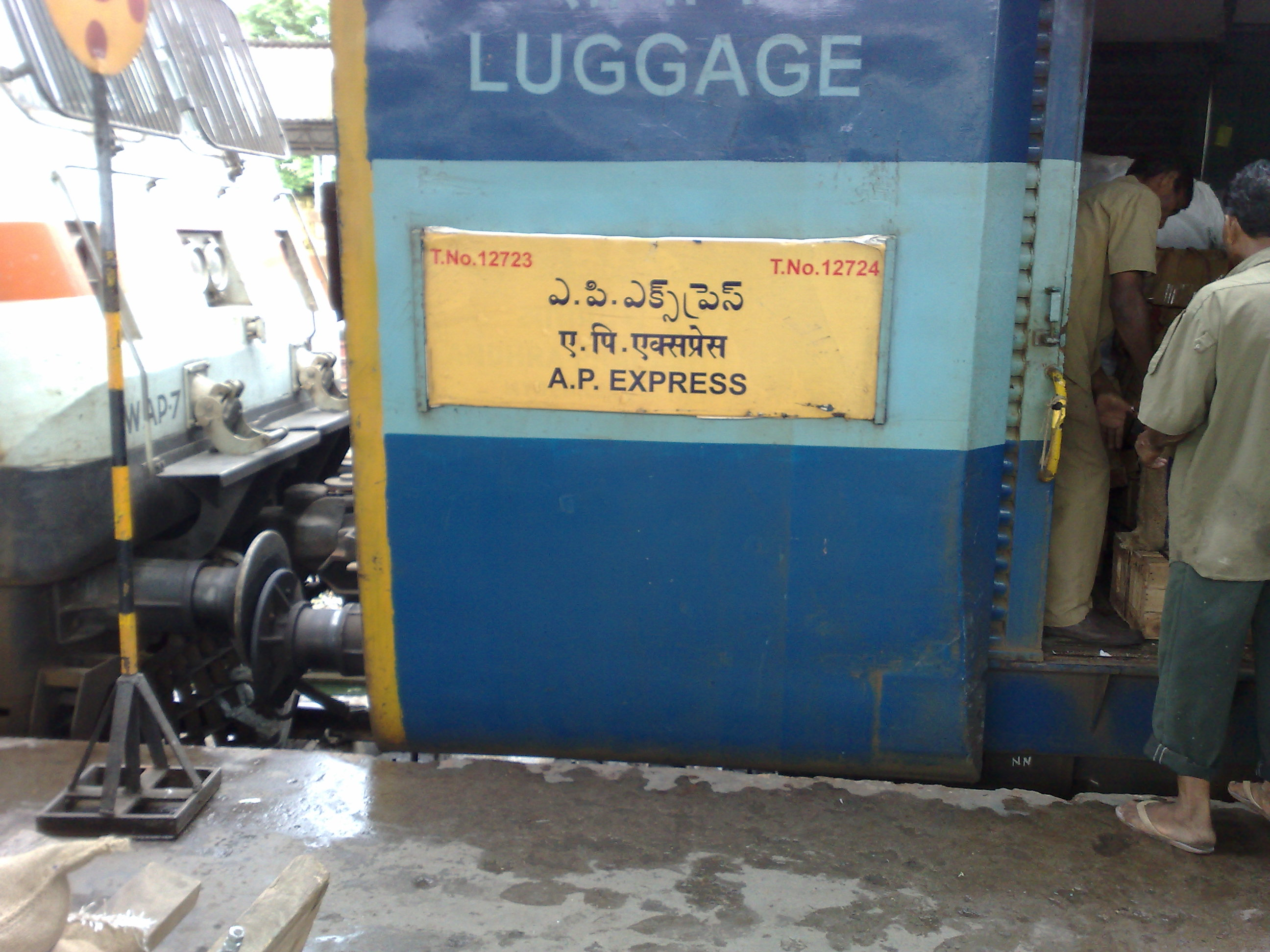

Overview
- Service type: Superfast Express
- Locale: Telangana, Maharashtra, Madhya Pradesh, Uttar Pradesh, Rajasthan, Uttar Pradesh, Delhi
- Current operator: South Central Railways

Route
- Termini: Hyderabad Deccan railway station New Delhi railway station
- Distance travelled: 1,677 km (1,042 mi)
- Average journey time: 26 hours 30 minutes
- Service frequency: Daily
- Train number: 12724 / 12723

On-board services
- Classes: AC first class, AC two tier, AC 3 tier, sleeper, pantry, unreserved
- Seating arrangements: Yes
- Sleeping arrangements: Yes
- Catering facilities: Yes

Technical
- Rolling stock: WAP7 Lallaguda Shed from Secunderabad to New Delhi
- Track gauge: 1,676 mm (5 ft 6 in)
- Operating speed: 63.28 km/h (39.32 mph) average with halts
Route map
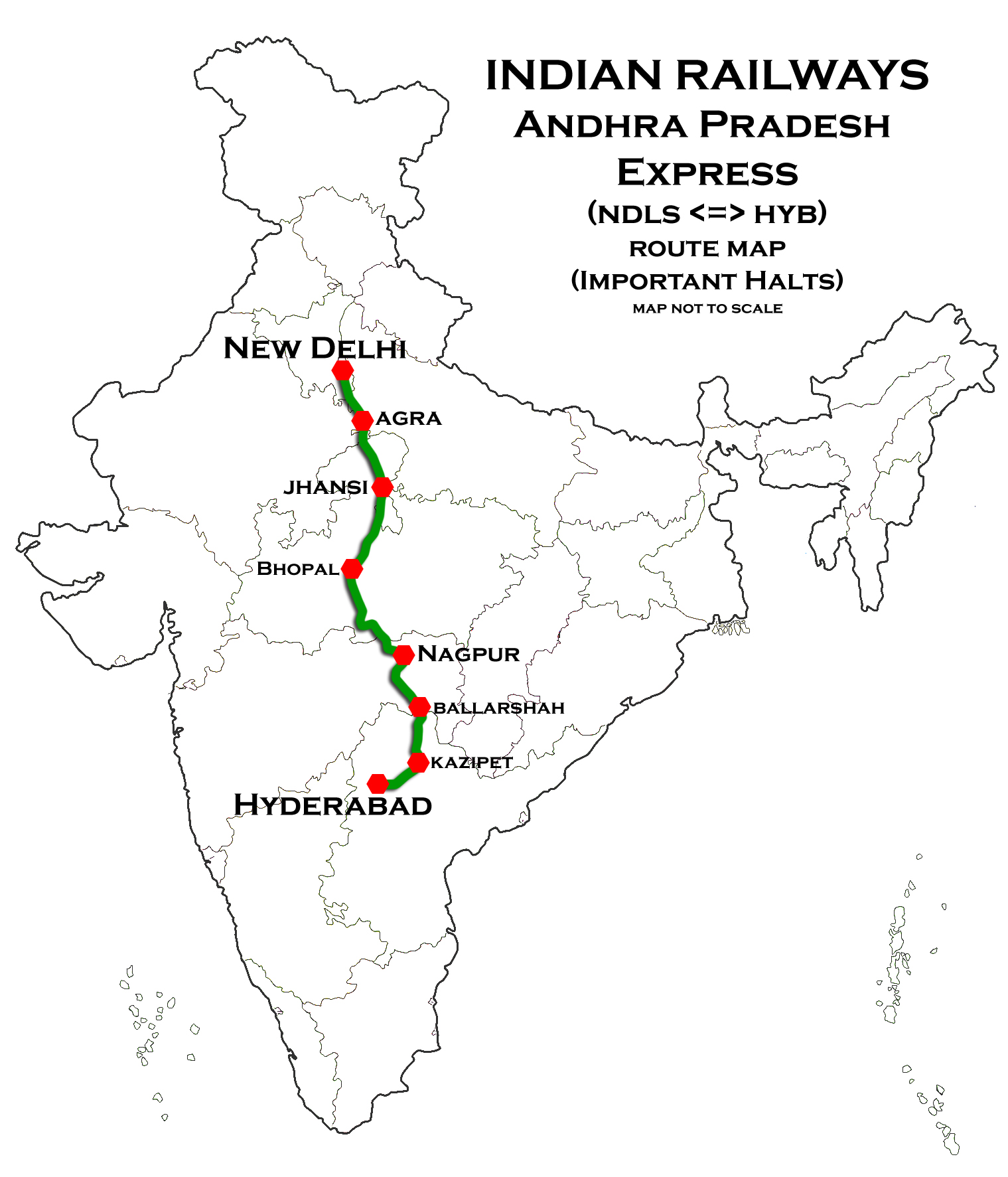

The Andhra Pradesh Express was a Superfast South Central Railway train that used to run between Hyderabad and New Delhi. It operated daily, taking around 27 hours to cover the distance while passing through the states of Andhra Pradesh (present-day Telangana), Maharashtra, Madhya Pradesh, Uttar Pradesh, Rajasthan, Haryana before reaching New Delhi.

Indian Railways had allocated the service number 12723 for the Hyderabad–New Delhi run, and service number 12724 for the New Delhi–Hyderabad run. The train service was first commissioned by Madhu Dandavate in 1976.

== Change of name ==
After the bifurcation of Andhra Pradesh, Andhra Pradesh Express runs from Telangana and hence, the name of the train was renamed as Telangana Express with effect from 15 November 2015. The new train between Visakhapatnam–Delhi via Vijayawada was named as Andhra Pradesh AC Express.

== See also ==
- Express trains in India
