= Charminar Express =

Train in India

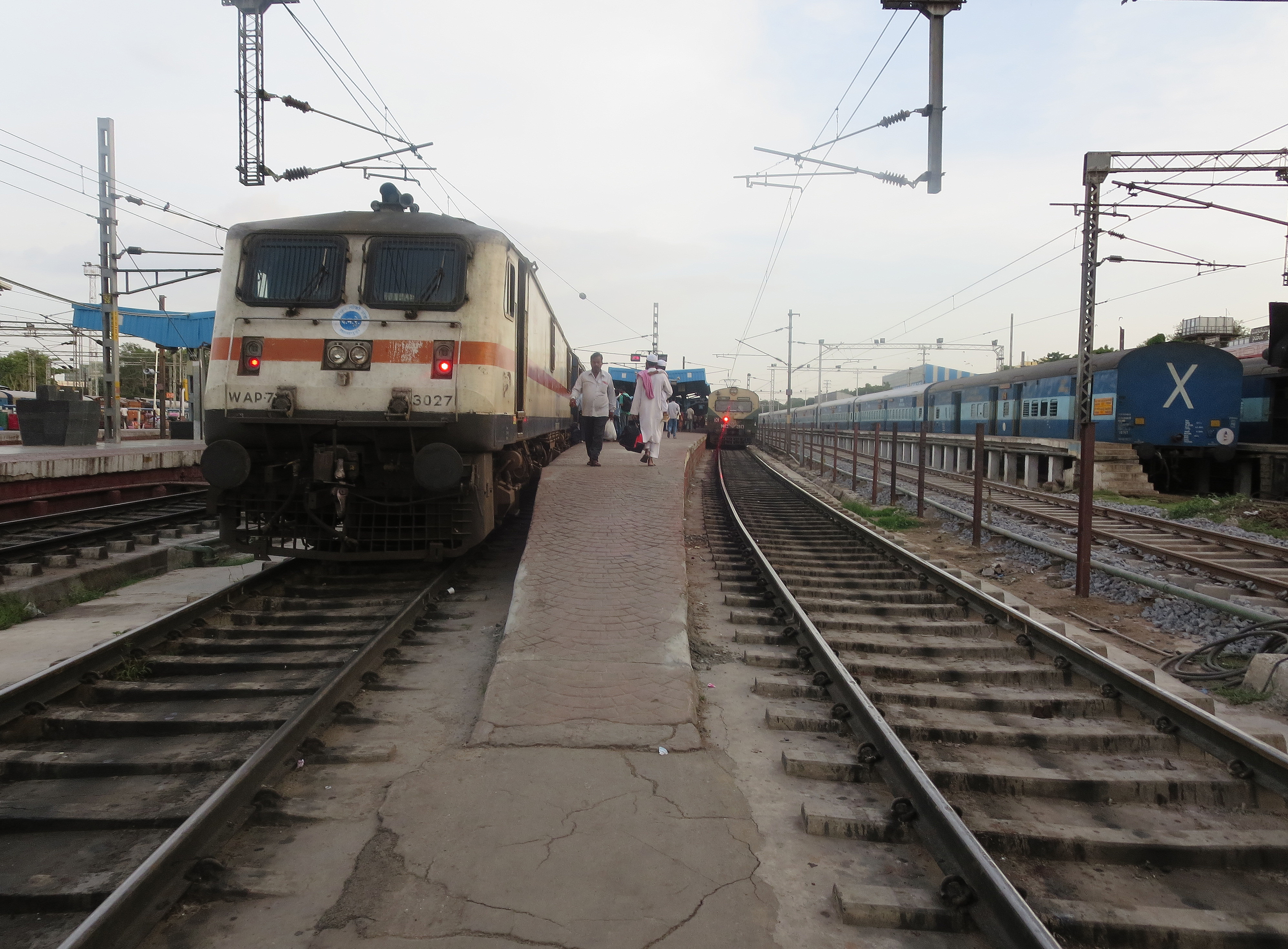
- Charminar Express at Nampally railway station

Overview
- Service type: Superfast
- Locale: Telangana, Andhra Pradesh & Tamil Nadu
- Current operator: South Central Railway

Route
- Termini: Hyderabad Deccan (HYB); Tambaram (TBM)
- Stops: 16
- Distance travelled: 818 km (508 mi)
- Average journey time: 14 hours 40 minutes
- Service frequency: Daily
- Train number: 12759 / 12760

On-board services
- Classes: AC First Class, AC 2 Tier, AC 3 Tier, Sleeper Class, General Unreserved
- Seating arrangements: Yes
- Sleeping arrangements: Yes
- Catering facilities: On-board catering, E-catering
- Observation facilities: Large windows
- Baggage facilities: Available
- Other facilities: Below the seats

Technical
- Rolling stock: LHB coach
- Track gauge: 1,676 mm (5 ft 6 in)
- Operating speed: 57 km/h (35 mph) average including halts.
Route map
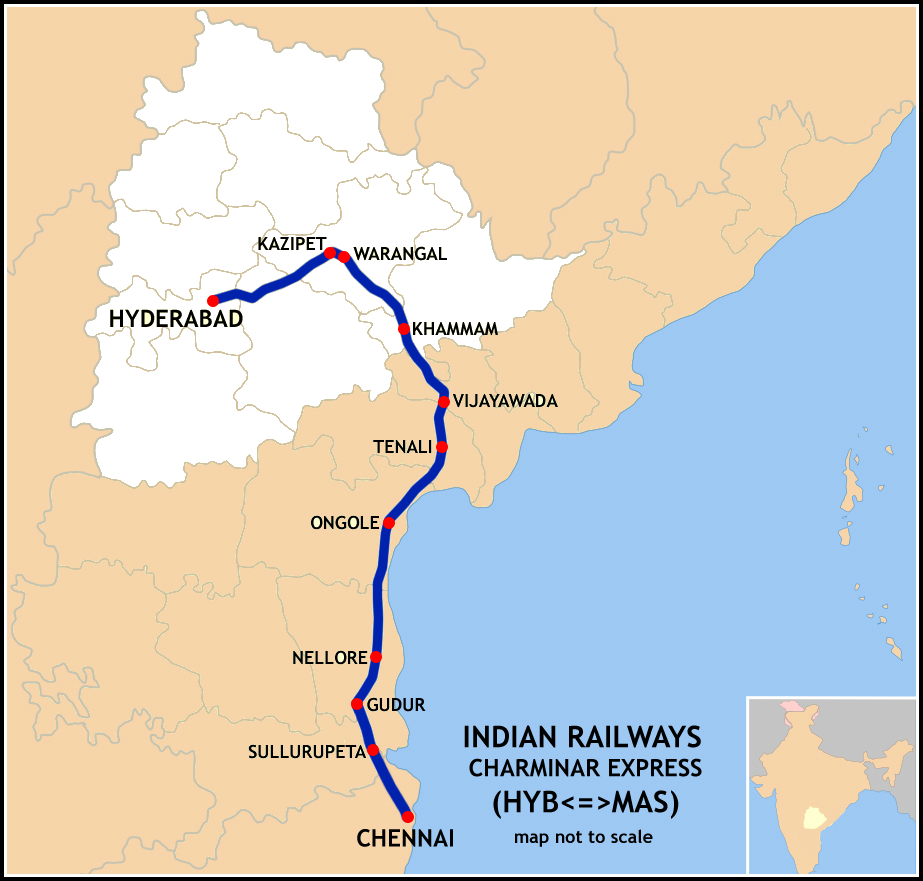

The 12759 / 12760 Charminar Express is an superfast express train that operates between Tambaram, a city in Chennai metropolitan area and Hyderabad. In 2020, the railway board approved the change of terminals from Chennai Central to Tambaram railway station, which is considered as the third railway hub of Chennai.

== Train schedule ==
Charminar is one of the most prestigious trains of SCR, with 24 coaches (first 24-coacher of SCR). After it got its LHB rakes it was reduced to 22 coaches.

- Train number 12759 runs from Chennai Tambaram to Hyderabad. It departs from Tambaram (TBM) at 17.30 Hrs and arrives at Hyderabad Deccan Nampally Station (HYB) at 08.10 Hrs the next day, with 16 intermediate halts.
- Train number 12760 runs from Hyderabad to Chennai Tambaram. It departs from Hyderabad Deccan Nampally Station (HYB) at 18.00 Hrs and arrives at Tambaram (TBM) at 08.00 Hrs next day.

== Coach composition & Rake Sharing ==
The train consists of 22 coaches.

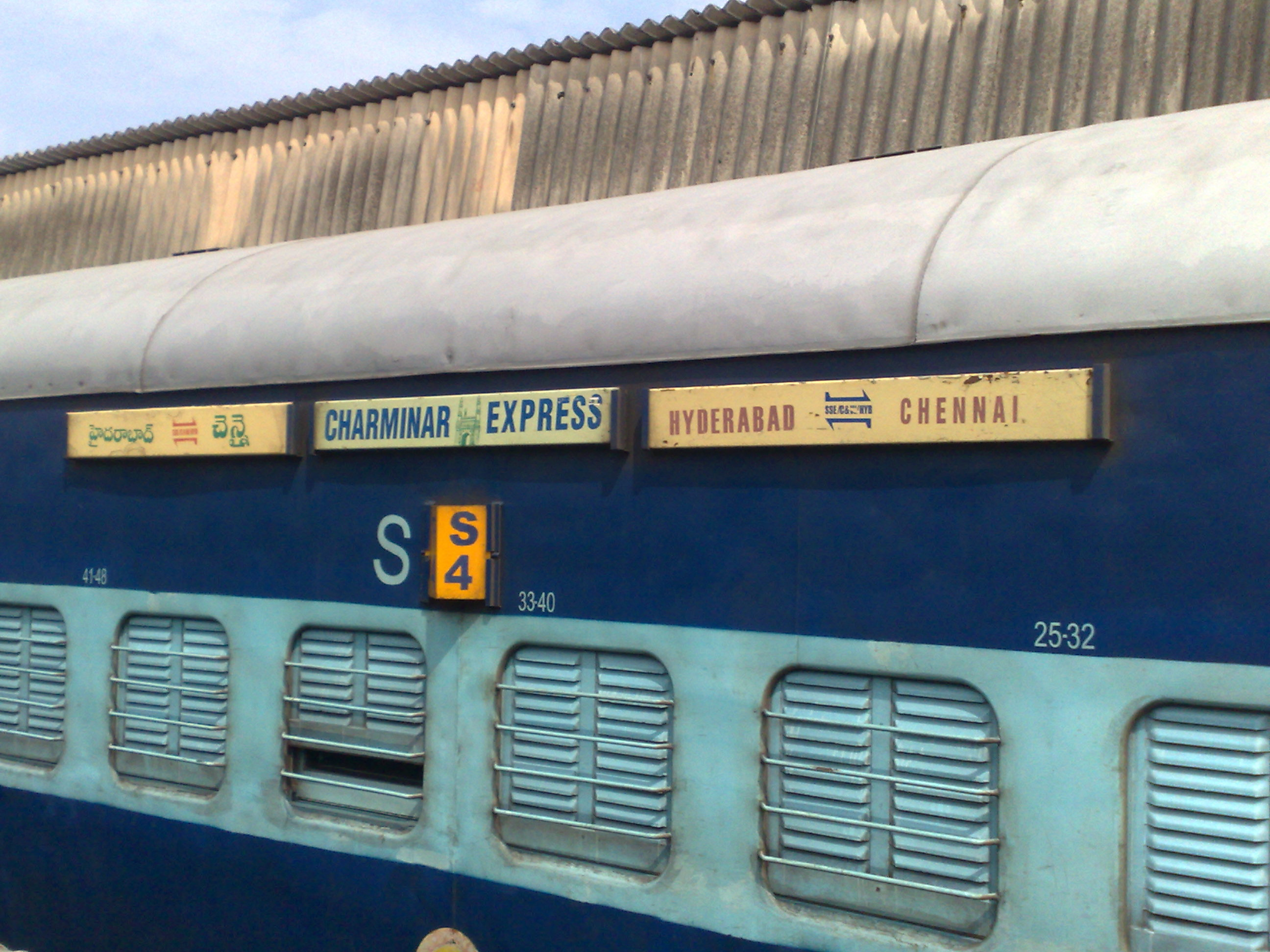
Name board of Charminar Express

- 1 AC First cum AC Two Tier,
- 3 AC Two Tier,
- 6 AC Three Tier,
- 6 Sleeper class,
- 4 General Unreserved,
- 1 Luggage Cum Divyangjan Car
- 1 End-on Generator cars (EOG).

Moreover, Charminar Express is one of the few trains of the country having CBC (Centre Buffer Coupling) rakes with GPS system. Also the first train to become a CBC. And first 24 coacher of SCR. From 5 November 2019, Charminar Express is being operated with LHB coach and coaches were reduced to 22.

- The Train Share its Rake with 17049/50 Hubballi–Hyderabad Express

== Relevance ==
This train is named after Charminar, an historical monument in Hyderabad built to mark the victory against the plague epidemic that haunted Hyderabad in the 15th century. "Charminar" refers to the four minarets of the monument on the top.

== Traction ==
It is hauled by a Lallaguda Loco Shed/ Vijayawada Loco Shed based WAP-7 electric locomotive on its entire journey.

== Route and halts ==
- Hyderabad Deccan
- Secunderabad Junction
- Kazipet Junction
- Warangal
- Dornakal Junction
- Khammam
- Vijayawada Junction
- Tenali Junction
- Chirala
- Ongole
- Kavali
- Nellore
- Gudur Junction
- Naidupeta
- Sullurupeta
- Chennai Egmore
- Tambaram

== See also ==
- Charminar
- Rail transport in India
- South Central Railway zone
- Rajkot–Secunderabad Express
