= Hussainsagar Express =

Train in India

Hussain Sagar Superfast Express
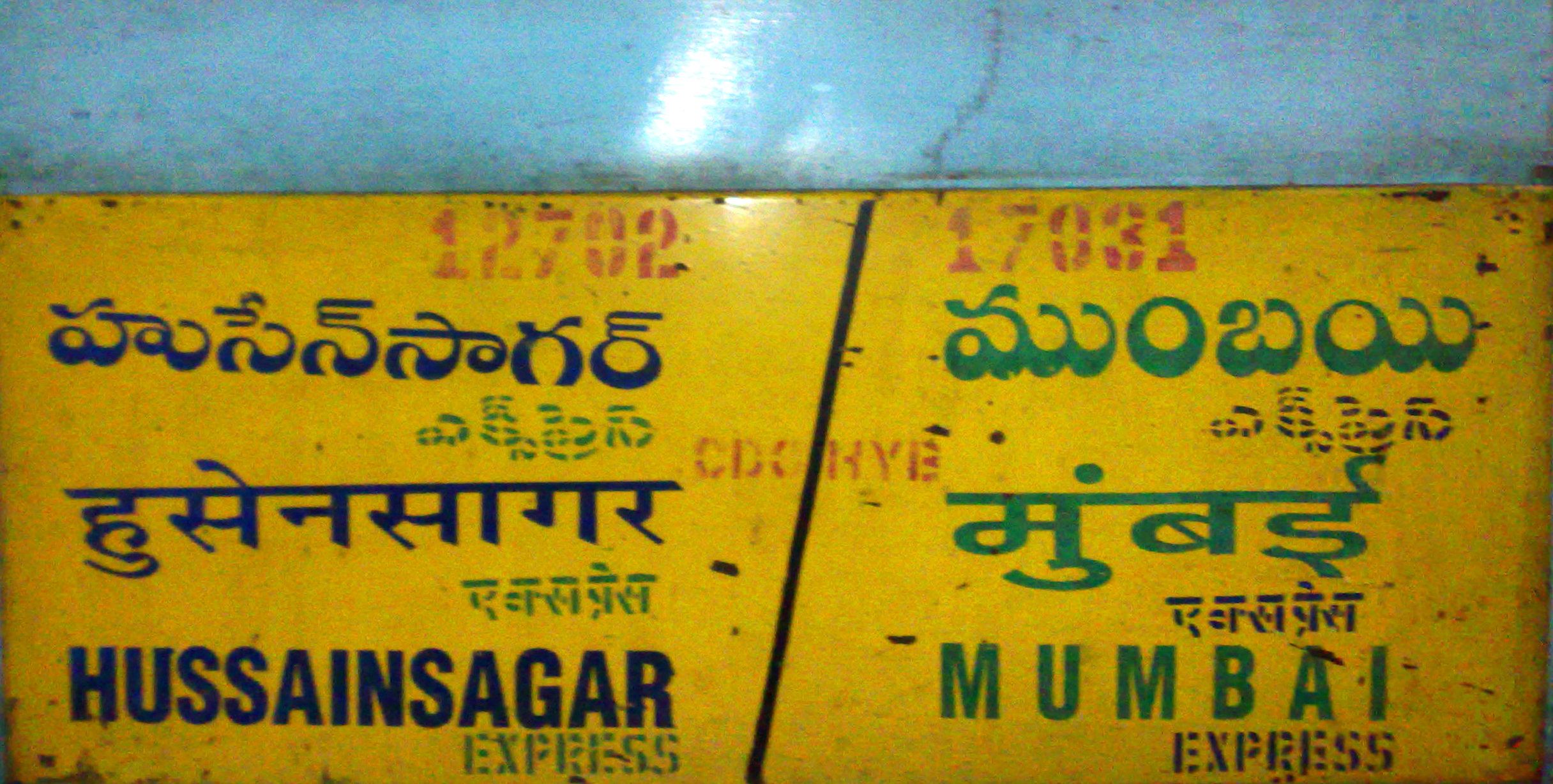
- Hussain Sagar Express train board.

Overview
- Service type: Superfast
- Locale: Telangana & Maharashtra
- First service: 1 October 1993; 32 years ago
- Current operator: South Central Railway

Route
- Termini: Hyderabad Deccan (HYB); CSMT Mumbai (CSMT)
- Stops: 15
- Distance travelled: 790 km (491 mi)
- Average journey time: 14 hours 10 minutes
- Service frequency: Daily
- Train number: 12701 / 12702

On-board services
- Classes: AC 2 Tier, AC 3 Tier, Sleeper Class, General Unreserved
- Seating arrangements: Yes
- Sleeping arrangements: Yes
- Catering facilities: On-board catering, E-catering
- Observation facilities: Large windows
- Baggage facilities: Available
- Other facilities: Below the seats

Technical
- Rolling stock: LHB coach
- Track gauge: Broad Gauge
- Operating speed: 56 km/h (35 mph) average including halts.
Route map
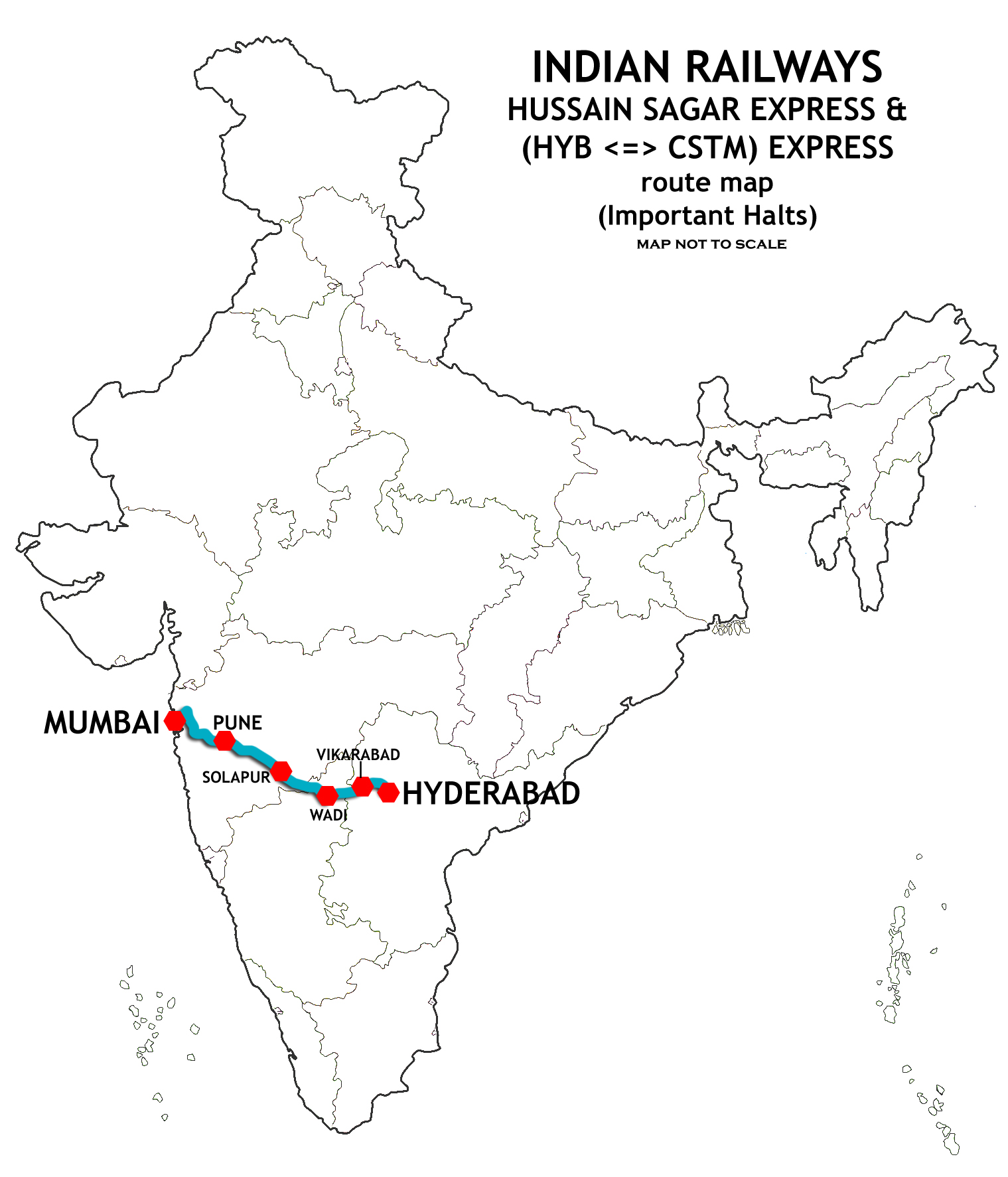

The 12701 / 12702 Hussain Sagar Superfast Express is a superfast express train operated by South Central Railway between Hyderabad and Mumbai CST. This train (then No. 7001/7002) was started on 17 October 1993 (from Hyderabad end and on 18 October 1993 from Mumbai end) as a tri-weekly train and was soon made a daily train in 1994 by shifting it to the time and slot of the 2101/2102 Minar Express which used to run between Bombay VT and Secunderabad Junction.

== Etymology ==
The train is named after the Hussain Sagar lake in Hyderabad, India built by Hussain Shah Wali in 1562, during the rule of Ibrahim Quli Qutb Shah.

The train was introduced as a replacement to the former Minar Express which operated between Secunderabad and Mumbai.

== Train number ==
12701: Mumbai CST–Hyderabad Deccan Hussainsagar express

12702: Hyderabad Deccan–Mumbai CST Hussainsagar express

The train travels a distance of 429 miles (790 km) in 13 hours 45 minutes at an average speed of 58.7 km/h.

== Composition ==
12701 Hussainsagar Express ENG-SLR-GEN-S10-S9-S8-S7-S6-S5-S4-S3-S2-S1-B2-B1-A1-HA1-GEN-SLR

12702 Hussainsagar Express ENG-SLR-GEN-A1-B1-B2-B3-S1-S2-S3-S4-S5-S6-S7-S8-S9-S10-GEN-SLR

The train has a rake-sharing arrangement (RSA) with the Hyderabad Mumbai Express.

== Locomotive ==
The Hussainsagar Express used to be hauled by WCM locomotive and later by WCAM-3 or WCG-2 locomotive of Kalyan shed between CSTM and Pune. After the start of DC to AC conversion of Pune to Kalyan stretch it was hauled by a single WDM-3A diesel locomotive from SCR's Diesel Loco Shed, Kazipet.

From mid 2013 onwards the loco links have been changed and it is now being hauled by Central Railway's Kalyan shed WDM-3A or WDM-3D or WDP-4D locomotive for its entire journey between Hyderabad and Mumbai CSMT.

However, with increase in the length of electrification between the entire section, it is now hauled by a Lallaguda Loco Shed-based WAP-7 electric locomotive on its entire journey.

== Time table ==
Station Code	Station Name	Arrival	Departure
CSMT	Chhtrapati Shivaji Maharaj Terminus	---	21:50
KYN	Kalyan Junction	22:37	22:40
KJT	Karjat Junction	23:18	23:21
LNL	Lonavala	00:01	00:03
PUNE	Pune Junction	01:20	01:25
KWV	Kurduwadi Junction	04:28	04:30
SUR	Solapur	05:30	05:35
GUR	Gangapur Road	06:48	06:50
KLBG	Kalaburagi Junction	07:37	07:40
SDB	Shahabad	08:10	08:11
WADI	Wadi Junction	08:35	08:40
CT	Chittapur	08:57	08:58
SEM	Sedam	09:14	09:15
TDU	Tandur	09:39	09:40
VKB	Vikarabad Junction	10:25	10:27
LPI	Lingampalli	11:05	11:08
BMT	Begumpet	11:20	11:21
HYB	Hyderabad Deccan Nampally	12:10	---

== Gallery ==
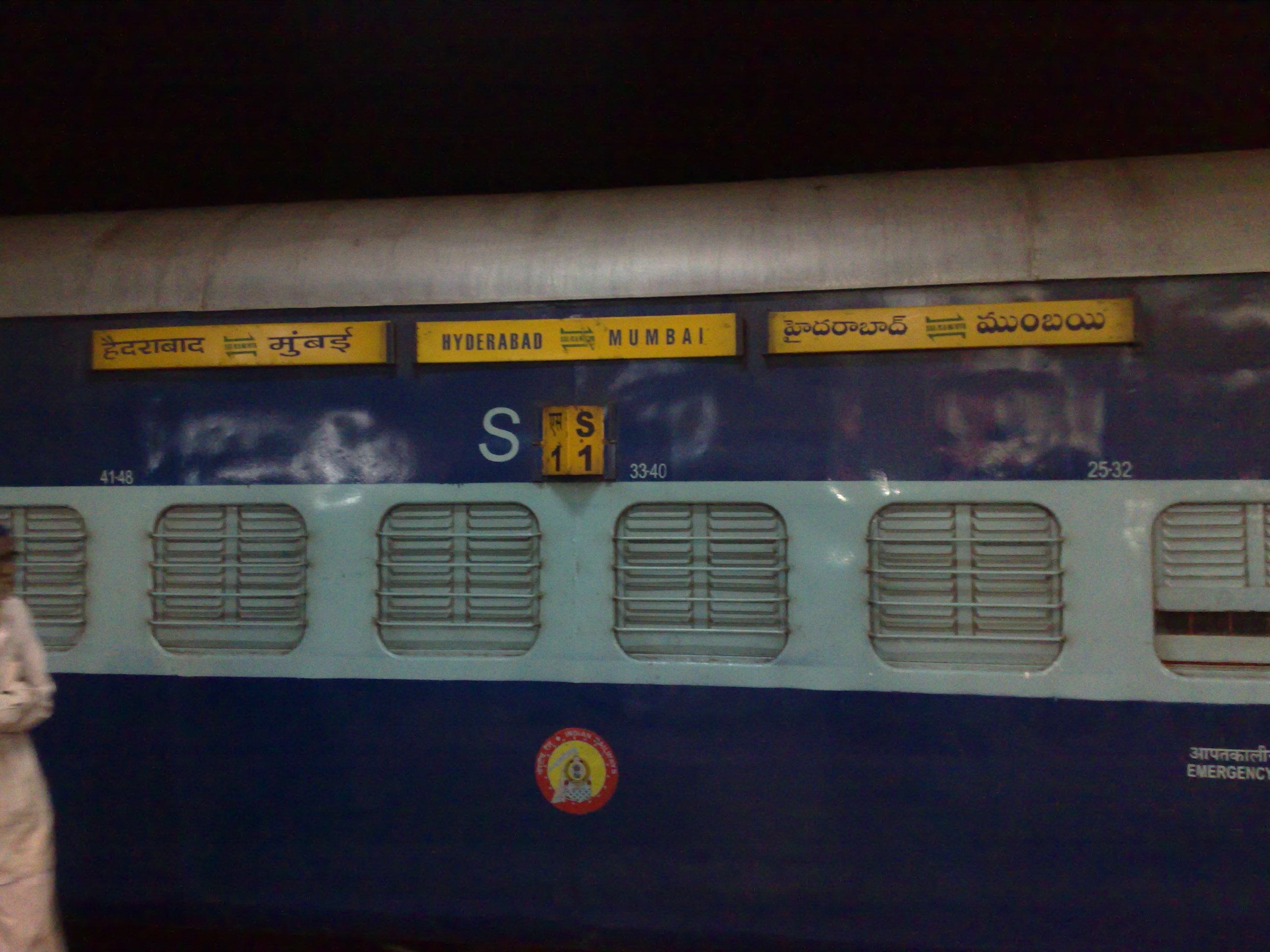
12702 Hussainsagar Express – Coach S1

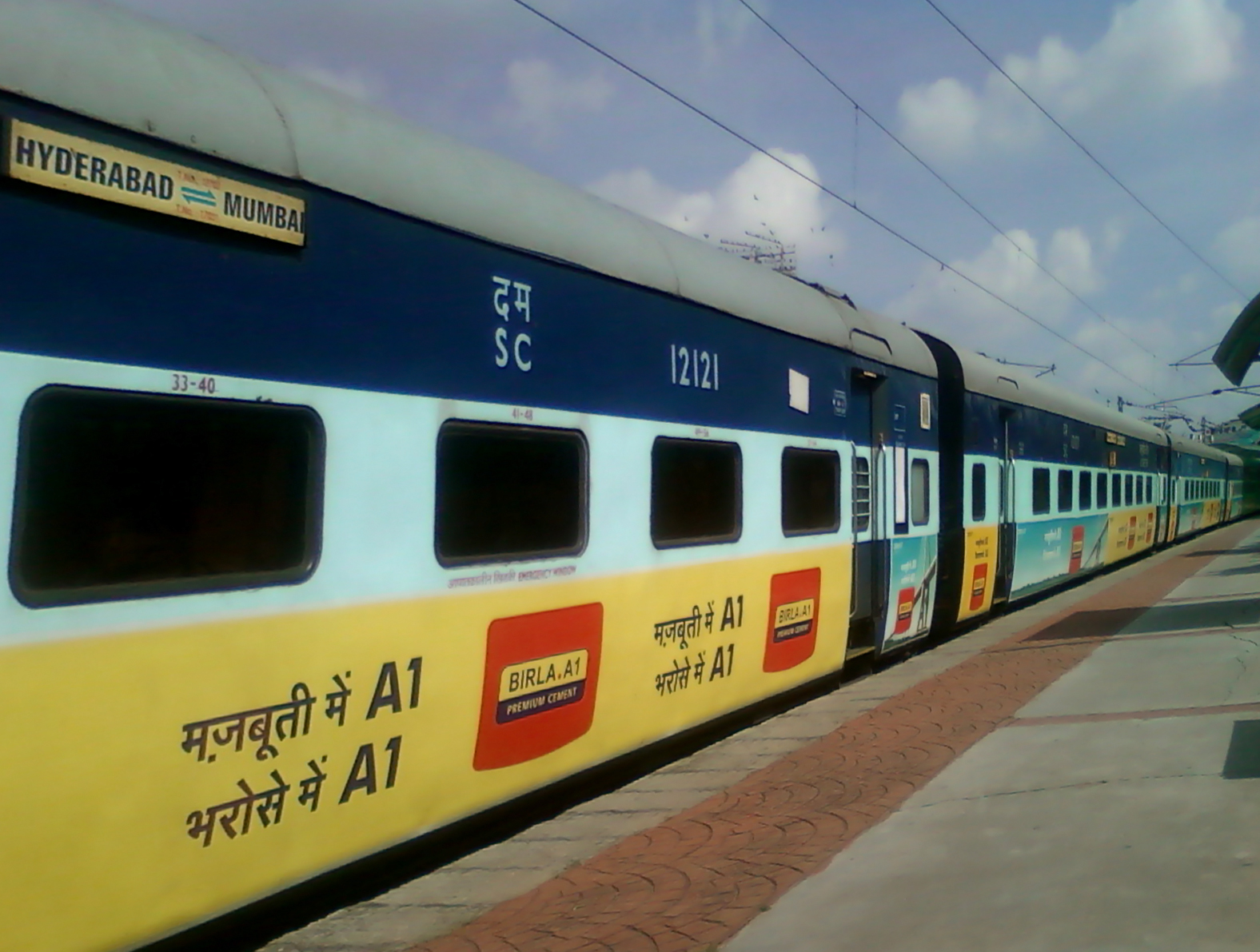
Hussainsagar Express – Coach B1

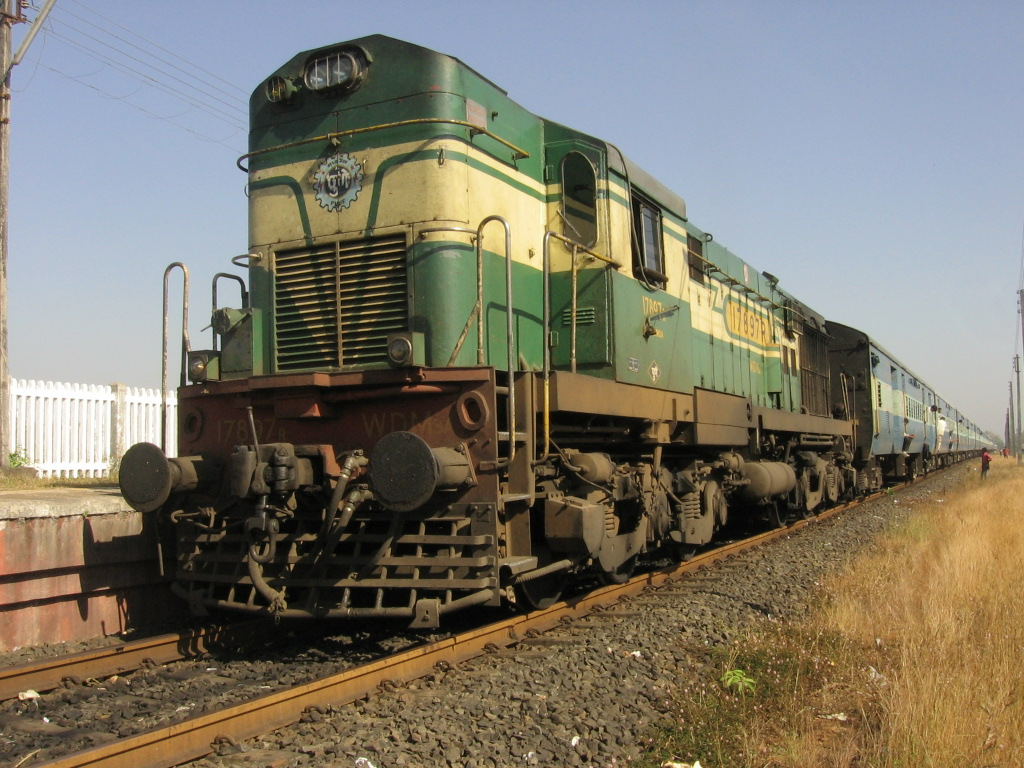
The diesel locomotive WDM-3A with Hussainsagar Express

== See also ==
- Rail transport in India
- South Central Railway
- Famous trains
- Hyderabad
- Husain Sagar
