= Dakshin Express =

Train in India

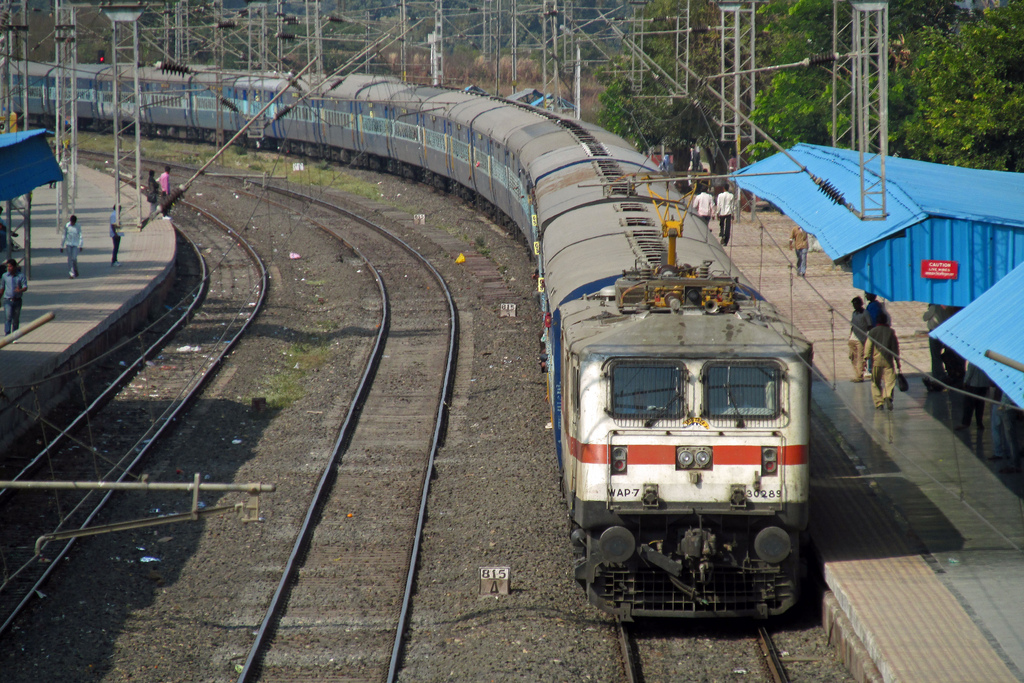
- Dakshin Express at Ghoradongri in Madhya Pradesh.

Overview
- Service type: Superfast
- Locale: Telangana, Maharashtra, Madhya Pradesh, Rajasthan, Uttar Pradesh, Haryana, & Delhi
- First service: 1 January 1968; 58 years ago
- Current operator: South Central Railway

Route
- Termini: Hyderabad Deccan (HYB); Hazrat Nizamuddin (NZM)
- Stops: 46
- Distance travelled: 1,673 km (1,040 mi)
- Average journey time: 28 hours 45 minutes
- Service frequency: Daily
- Train number: 12721 / 12722

On-board services
- Classes: AC First Class, AC 2 Tier, AC 3 Tier, Sleeper Class, General Unreserved
- Seating arrangements: Yes
- Sleeping arrangements: Yes
- Catering facilities: Available
- Observation facilities: Large windows
- Baggage facilities: Available
- Other facilities: Below the seats

Technical
- Rolling stock: LHB coach
- Track gauge: 1,676 mm (5 ft 6 in)
- Operating speed: 130 km/h (81 mph) maximum, 58 km/h (36 mph) average including halts.
Route map
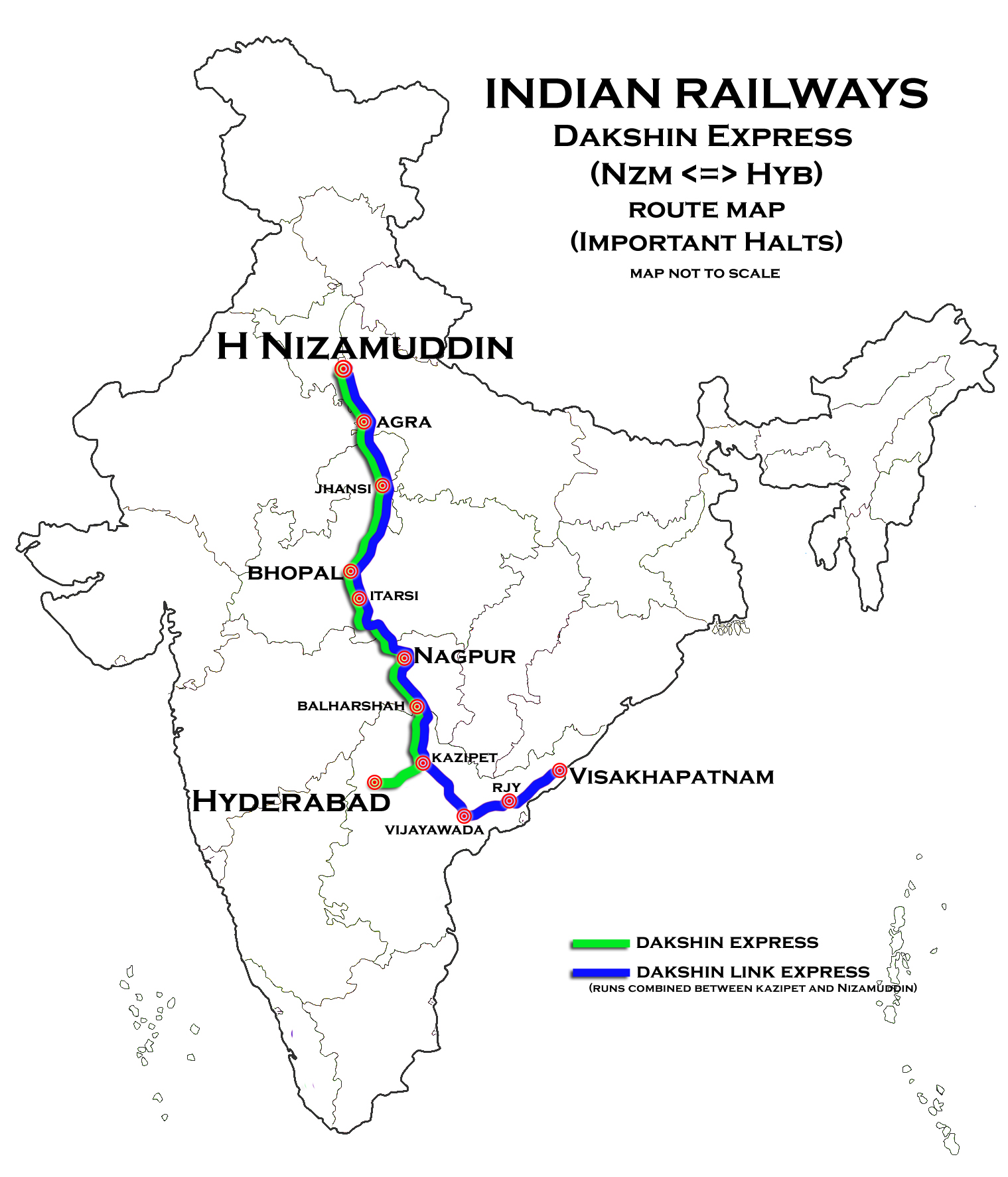

The 12721 / 12722 Dakshin Express is an superfast express train belonging to Indian Railways that runs between Hyderabad Deccan and Hazrat Nizamuddin in India. It is a daily service. It operates as train number 12721 from Hyderabad Deccan to Hazrat Nizamuddin and as train number 12722 in the reverse direction. Prior to introduction of Andhra Pradesh Express between New Delhi & Visakhapatnam in 2015, Dakshin Express used to have a link train to Visakhapatnam from Kazipet as 12861/12862 Link Express. But now Dakshin Express runs only between Hyderabad Deccan & Hazrat Nizamuddin

== History ==
Dakshin Express started its first run on 01/01/1968 numbered as 721 Up/722 Down New Delhi & Hyderabad Deccan. In 1985, the train was shifted to Hazrat Nizamuddin & Link service numbered as 861/862 to Visakhapatnam from Kazipet was started. It was a Mail Express train that time until 2009. Timings in 1985-2009 period were:- 721 UP(Later 7021 UP) Dakshin Express used to leave Hyderabad Deccan at 21.30 pm & reach Hazrat Nizamuddin on 3rd day at 05.00 am covering 1,673.2 kilometres (1,039.7 mi) in 31 hrs 30 mins running at 53 km/h (33 mph). In return journey 722 DN(Later 7022 DN) Dakshin Express used to leave Hazrat Nizamuddin at 21.45 pm & reach Hyderabad Deccan on 3rd day at 05.15 am covering 1,673.2 kilometres (1,039.7 mi) in 31 hrs 30 mins running at 53 km/h (33 mph) speed. Link service to Visakhapatnam timing was:- 861 UP(Later 8561 UP) used to leave Visakhapatnam at 14.00 pm, reaching Kazipet at 00.10 am & departing at 00.35 am after getting amalgamated with Dakshin Express. Return timings was:- Dakshin Express used to arrive Kazipet at 02.10 am for 25 mins stop. After bifurcation, the 862 DN(later 8562 DN) Link express used to depart Kazipet at 02.35 am & arrive Visakhapatnam at 12.45 pm. The 8561/8562 Link express used to cover 2,100.2 kilometres (1,305.0 mi) in 39 hrs running at 53.85 km/h (33 mph) speed. In 2010, Dakshin Express was renumbered 12721/12722 & Visakhapatnam Link Express was renumbered as 12861/62. Timings were speeded up with 12722 Dakshin Express departing Hazrat Nizamuddin at 23.00 hrs IST, reaching Hyderabad Deccan on 3rd day at 04.45 hrs IST & 12862 Link Express reaching Visakhapatnam on 3rd day 12.15 hrs IST. Return timings were also speeded up with 12721 departing Hyderabad Deccan at 22.45 hrs IST & 12861 Link Express departing Visakhapatnam at 15.15 hrs IST, both reaching Hazrat Nizamuddin at 04.30 hrs on 3rd day. 12721/12722 Dakshin Express was then covering 1,673.2 kilometres (1,039.7 mi) in 29 hrs 45 mins running at 56.25 km/h (35 mph) speed while 1861/62 Link Express was covering 2,100.2 kilometres (1,305.0 mi) in 37 hrs 15 mins running at 56.44 km/h (35 mph) speed. 12861/12862 Link Express was permanently made into Visakhapatnam - Kacheguda Express in 2015 after Andhra Pradesh Express was introduced between Visakhapatnam & New Delhi. 12861/12862 was extended to Mahbubnagar from 2021 onwards.

== Coaches ==
The 12721/2722 Dakshin Express presently has 1 AC 1st Class, 2 AC 2 tier, 6 AC 3 tier, 9 Sleeper class, 2 General Unreserved coaches & a Pantry car coach & 2 HCP (High Capacity Parcel) coaches. This Train has latest LHB coaches. This train consists of total 24 LHB coaches with 1 EOG (End of Generator) & 1 SLR (Sleeper cum Luggage Rake).

== Current Service ==
The 12721/12722 Dakshin Express covers the distance of 1673 kilometres in 28 hours 45 mins running at 58 km/h (36 mph) speed. As its average speed in both directions is above 55 km/h (34 mph) as per Indian Railways rules, its fare has a Superfast surcharge.

== Traction ==
It is hauled by a Lallaguda Loco Shed based WAP-7 electric locomotive on its entire journey.

== Current Timetable ==
- 12721 Dakshin Express leaves Hyderabad Deccan every day at 23:00 hrs IST and reaches Hazrat Nizamuddin at 03:45 hrs IST on the 3rd day.
- 12722 Dakshin Express leaves Hazrat Nizamuddin every day at 22:55 hrs IST and reaches Hyderabad Deccan at 03:40 hrs IST on the 3rd day.

== Route & halts ==
It runs from Hyderabad Deccan via Secunderabad Junction, Kazipet Junction, Peddapalli Junction, Ramagundam, Sirpur Kaghaznagar, Balharshah Junction, Sevagram Junction, Nagpur Junction, Betul, Itarsi Junction, Narmadapuram, Bhopal Junction, Jhansi Junction, Gwalior Junction, Morena, Agra Cantonment, Mathura Junction to Hazrat Nizamuddin.

== Gallery ==
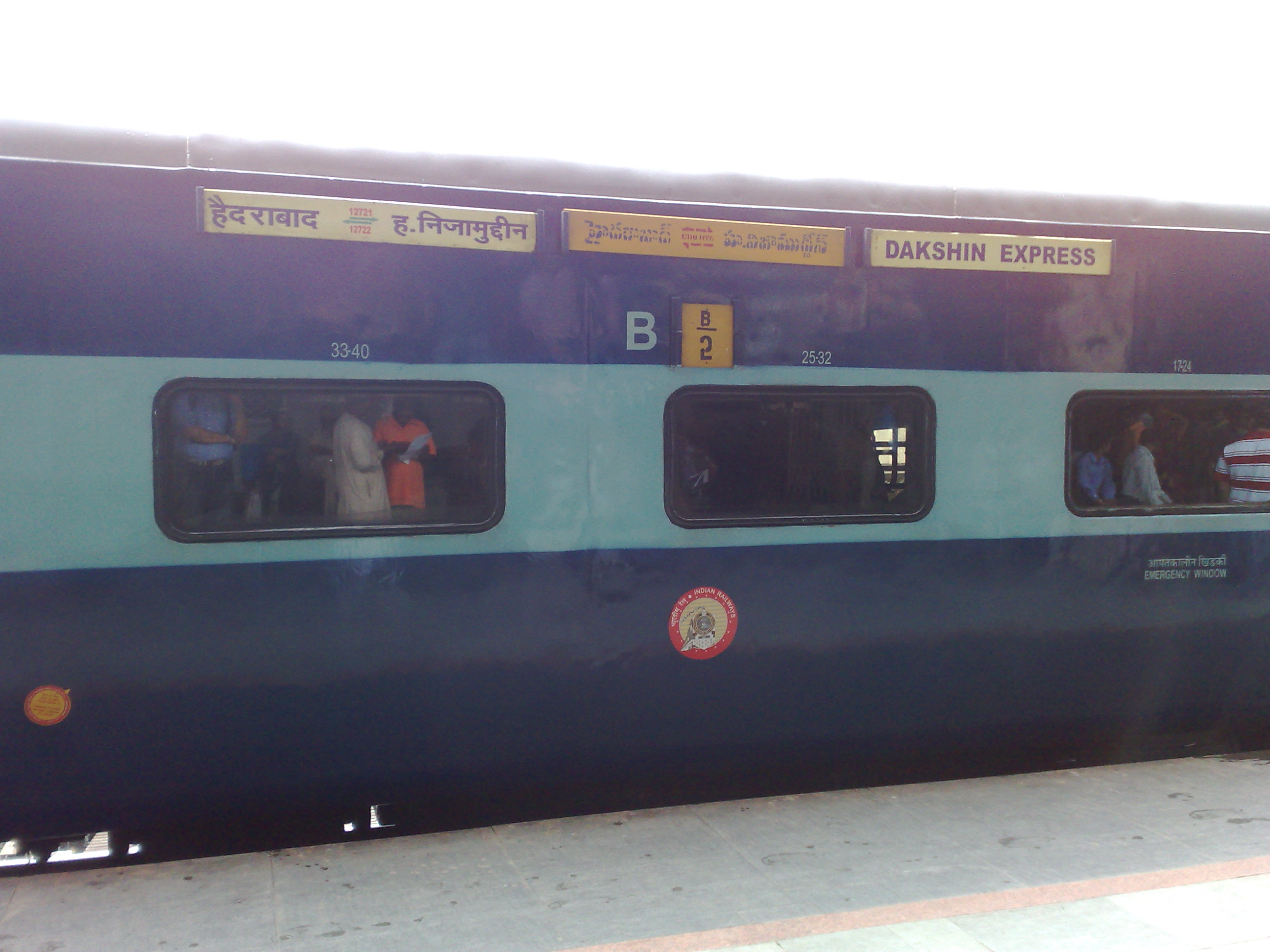
12721 Dakshin Express trainboard – AC 3 tier coach

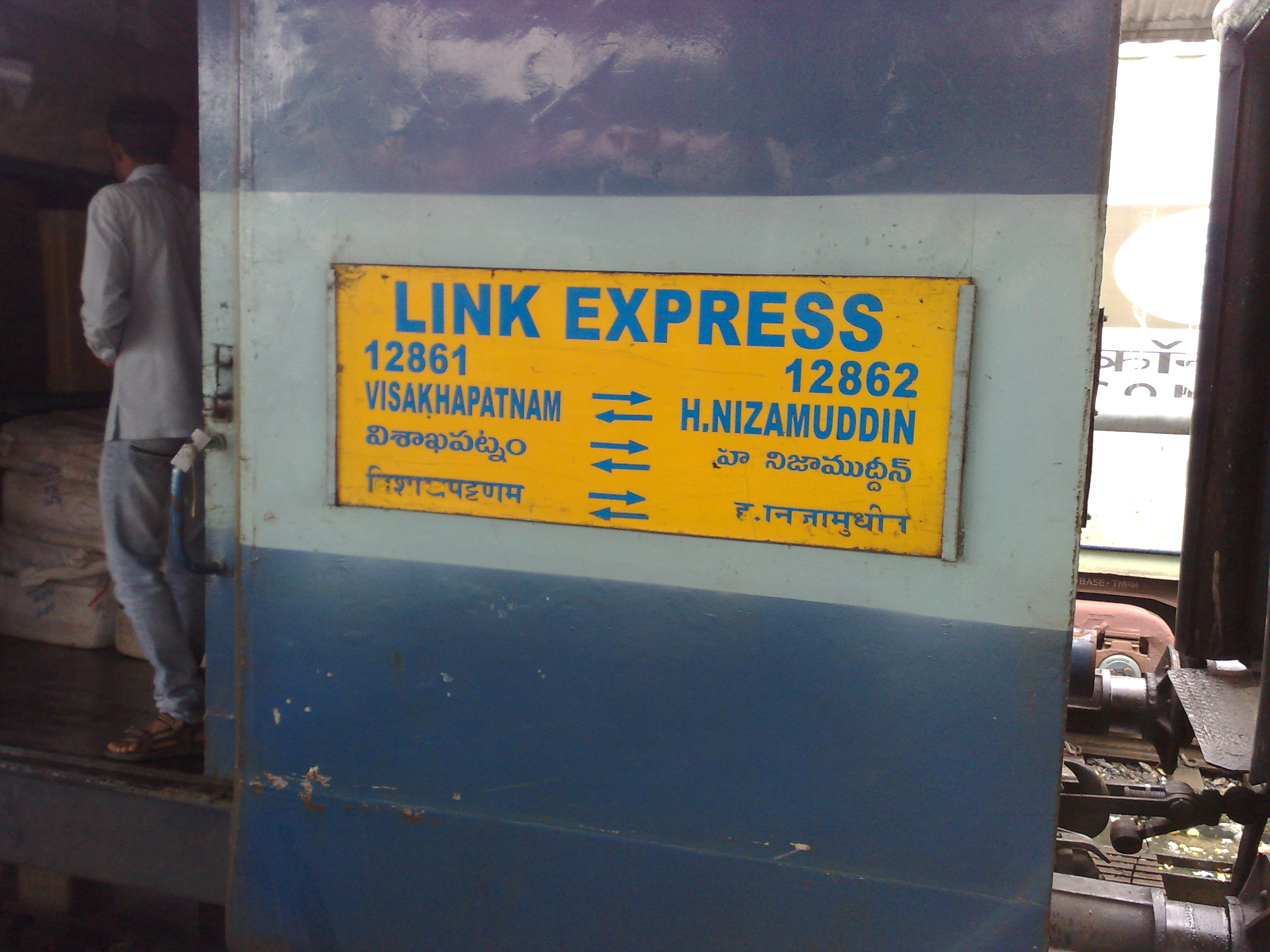
12862 Visakhapatnam Dakshin Link Express

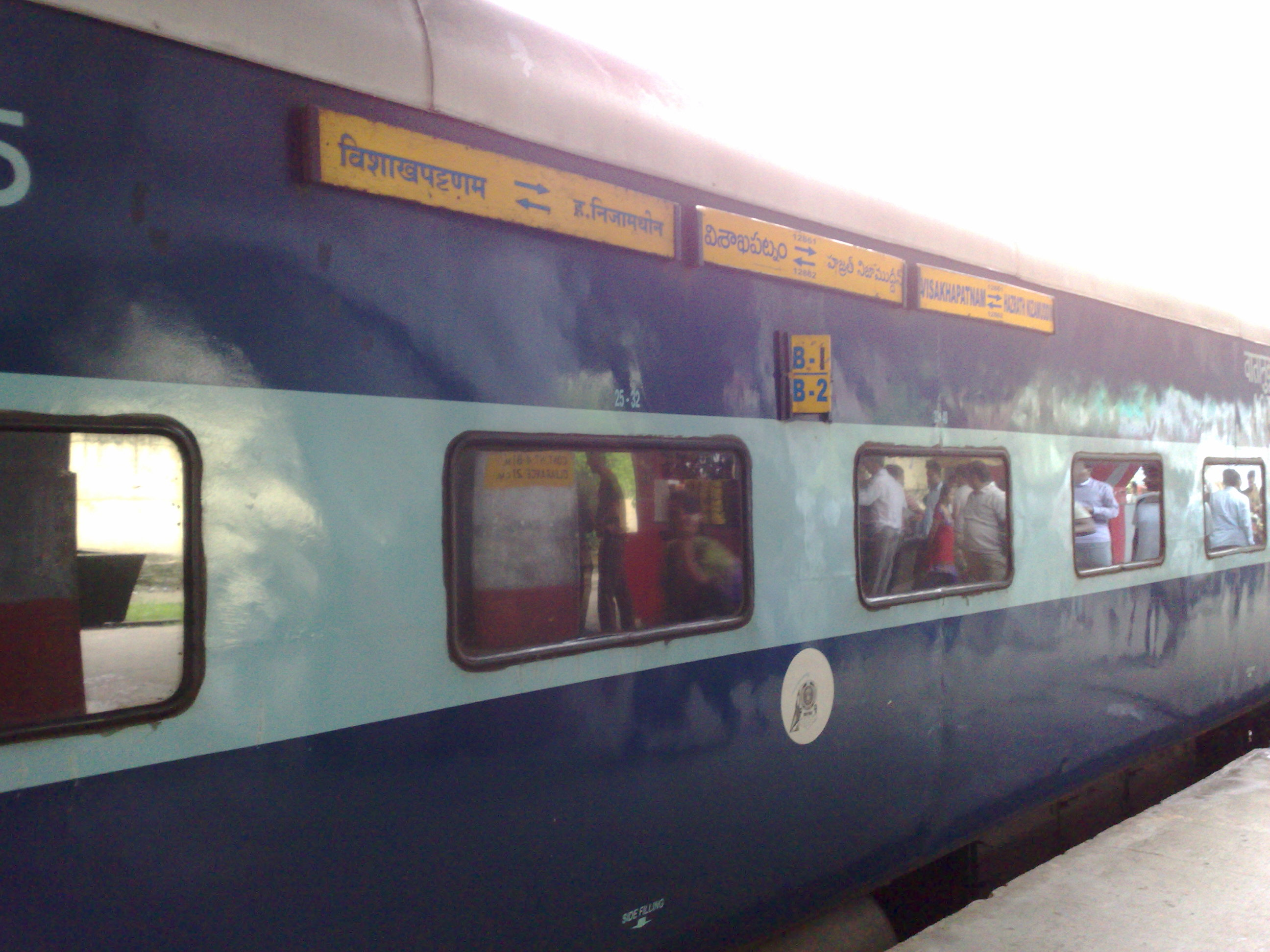
12862 Visakhapatnam Link Express – AC 3 tier coach
