= Hyderabad Deccan railway station =

Railway station in Nampally mandal, Telangana, India

Hyderabad Deccan Nampally, Hyderabad
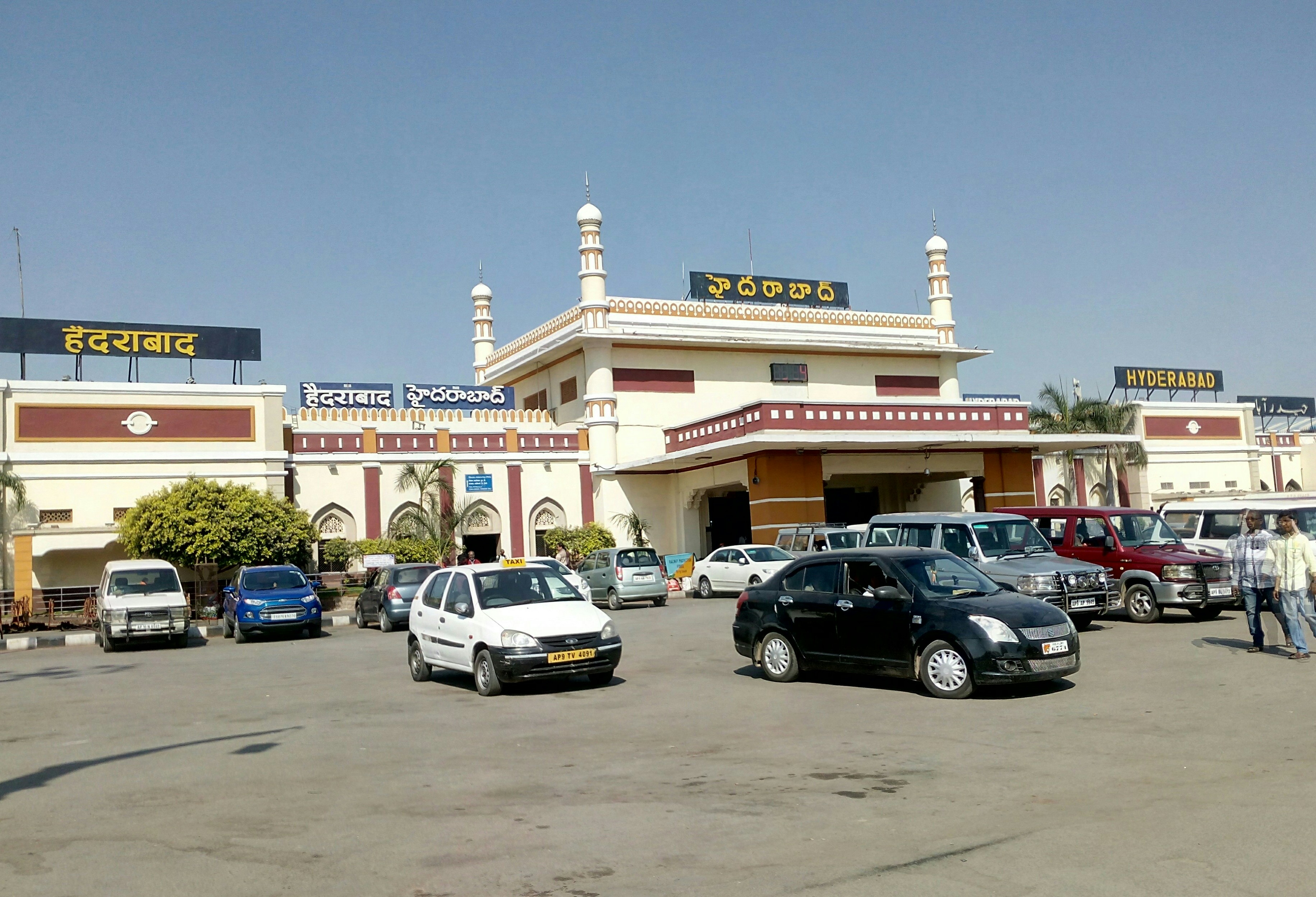
- Front view of the station

General information
- Location: Nampally, Hyderabad, Telangana; India
- Coordinates: 17°23′32.64″N 78°28′3″E
- Elevation: 536 m (1,759 ft)
- System: Indian Railways and Hyderabad MMTS station
- Owner: Indian Railways
- Operator: South Central Railways
- Platforms: 6
- Tracks: 22
- Connections: Red Line Nampally

Construction
- Structure type: At-grade
- Parking: Yes
- Accessible: Available

Other information
- Status: Functioning
- Station code: HYB
- Zone(s): South Central Railway zone
- Division(s): Secunderabad

History
- Opened: 1907; 119 years ago
Location
- Location within Hyderabad Location within Telangana Location within India
- Interactive map

Hyderabad Deccan railway station (station code: HYB) is a second grade non-suburban (NSG–2) category Indian railway station in Hyderabad railway division of South Central Railway zone. It was constructed and earlier run by the Nizam's Guaranteed State Railway of the Hyderabad State. It is located in Hyderabad of the Indian state of Telangana. It got selected as one of the 21 stations to be developed under Amrit Bharat Stations scheme.

== Introduction ==
Hyderabad Deccan railway station is a terminus, meaning the tracks go only in one direction. The station has 6 platforms. Platform No. 4 is the main platform that is directly located at the main entrance of the station, and is the first platform that one reaches after entering the station. Platform No. 4 is meant for trains departing from Hyderabad Deccan, such as Telangana Express, Charminar Express, Dakshin Express, Hyderabad–Visakhapatnam Godavari Express (PF. No. 5). Platform numbers 1, 2 and 3 are smaller platforms, and they are located on the "side" entrance of the station. These platforms are exclusively used for operating Hyderabad Multi Modal Transport System trains and the Warangal/ Kazipet Push-Pull Service, and other slow low priority trains. Platform number 5 is used for departure of trains and Platform No. 6 is exclusively used for the arrival and receival of incoming trains.

== Administration ==
It falls under the Secunderabad Division of South Central Railway. The station serves the city of Hyderabad by rail to and from many important towns and cities in the country.

== MMTS Rail ==
Hyderabad Deccan railway station is a train station in Hyderabad, Telangana, India. Localities like Salar Jung Museum, Charminar and Hyderguda are accessible from this station. MMTS trains run from Hyderabad Deccan to Lingampalli/Falaknuma.

== Developments ==
The station is powered by 228 kW (306 hp) solar power plant costing ₹1.3 crore (US$130,000) funded by Persistent Foundation and EPC completed by Sunshot Technologies. It is connected to Nampally Metro Station with a covered walkway and railing.

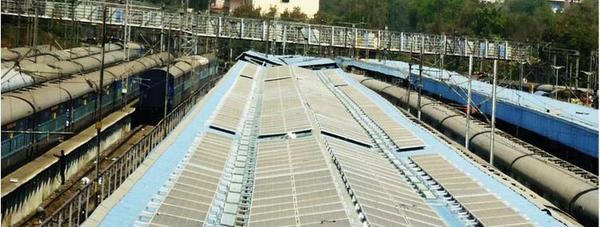
Solar power plant at Hyderabad railway station

== Lines ==
- Hyderabad Multi-Modal Transport System

== Originating express trains ==
Train No.	Train Name	Destination	Departure	Running	Route
17011	Sirpur Kaghaznagar Intercity Express	Sirpur Kaghaznagar	04:35	All Days	Secunderabad Jn., Kazipet Jn., Ramagundam
12723	Telangana Express	New Delhi	06:00	All Days	Secunderabad Jn., Kazipet Jn., Ramagundam, Balharshah, Nagpur, Bhopal Jn., Virangana Lakshmibai, Gwalior Jn., Agra Cantt., Mathura Jn., Hazrat Nizamuddin
17647	Hyderabad Deccan - Purna Express	Purna	08:40	All Days	Begampet, Vikarabad Jn., Bidar, Latur Road, Parbhani Jn.
17021	Vasco-da-Gama Weekly Express	Vasco-da-Gama	09:15	Thu	Secunderabad Jn., Kacheguda, Mahabubnagar, Kurnool City, Guntakal Jn., Bellary Jn., Hospet Jn., Gadag Jn., Hubli Jn., Castle Rock, Madgaon
12702	Hussainsagar SF Express	Chhatrapati Shivaji Maharaj Terminus (CSMT)	14:55	All Days	Begampet, Vikarabad Jn., Kalaburagi, Solapur Jn., Pune Jn., Kalyan Jn., Dadar
17020	Hyderabad Deccan - Hisar Weekly Express	Jaipur	15:10	Sat	Secunderabad Jn., Nizamabad, H.S. Nanded, Parbhani Jn., Jalna, Aurangabad, Manmad Jn., Bhusaval Jn., Itarsi Jn., Bhopal Jn., Ujjain Jn., Ratlam Jn., Chittaurgarh, Ajmer
17320	Hyderabad Deccan - SSS Hubli Express	SSS Hubli Jn.	15:50	All Days	Begampet, Vikarabad Jn., Kalaburagi, Bijapur, Badami, Gadag Jn.
12728	Hyderabad–Visakhapatnam Godavari Express	Visakhapatnam Jn.	17:05	All Days	Secunderabad Jn., Kazipet Jn., Vijayawada Jn., Eluru, Tadepalligudem, Rajamundry, Samalkot Jn., Tuni, Anakapalle
12760	Charminar Express	Tambaram	18:00	All Days	Secunderabad Jn., Kazipet Jn., Vijayawada Jn., Tenali Jn., Ongole, Nellore, Gudur Jn., Sullurupeta, Chennai Egmore
22731	Mumbai SF Express	Chhatrapati Shivaji Maharaj Terminus (CSMT)	22:35	All Days	Begampet, Vikarabad Jn., Kalaburagi, Solapur Jn., Daund Jn., Pune Jn., Kalyan Jn., Dadar
12721	Dakshin SF Express	Hazrat Nizamuddin	23:00	All Days	Secunderabad Jn., Kazipet Jn., Balharshah, Nagpur, Itarsi Jn., Bhopal Jn., Virangana Lakshmibai, Gwalior Jn., Agra Cantt., Mathura Jn., Faridabad
17005	Hyderabad Deccan - Raxaul Weekly Express	Raxaul	23:10	Thu	Secunderabad Jn., Kazipet Jn., Balharshah, Gondia Jn., Durg, Raupur Jn., Bilaspur Jn., Jharsuguda Jn., Rourkela, Bokaro Steel City, Dhanbad Jn., Jasidih Jn., Darbhanga Jn.

== Infrastructure ==
This station has 7 pit lines for primary maintenance of trains originating from here.

- Telangana Express to New Delhi
- Dakshin Express to Hazrat Nizamuddin
- Hyderabad–Visakhapatnam Godavari Express to Visakhapatnam
- Charminar Express to Tambaram ( Via Chennai Egmore )
- Hussainsagar Express to Mumbai
- Hyderabad–Mumbai Express
- East Coast Express to Kolkata Shalimar
- Hyderabad–Sirpur Kaghaznagar Intercity Express to Sirpur Kaghaznagar
- Hyderabad–Vasco da Gama Express to Vasco Da Gama
- Hyderabad–Pune Express
- Ajmer–Hyderabad Meenakshi Express to Jaipur { post extension to Jaipur }
- Narasapur–Hyderabad Express

And few weekly Express and Passenger trains are maintained here. Some of the trains which originating from Secunderabad will come to this station for primary maintenance.

== See also ==
- Nizam's Guaranteed State Railway
- Begumpet
- Kacheguda
- Malkajgiri
- Secunderabad
- South Central Railway
