= Andhra Pradesh Express =

Train in India

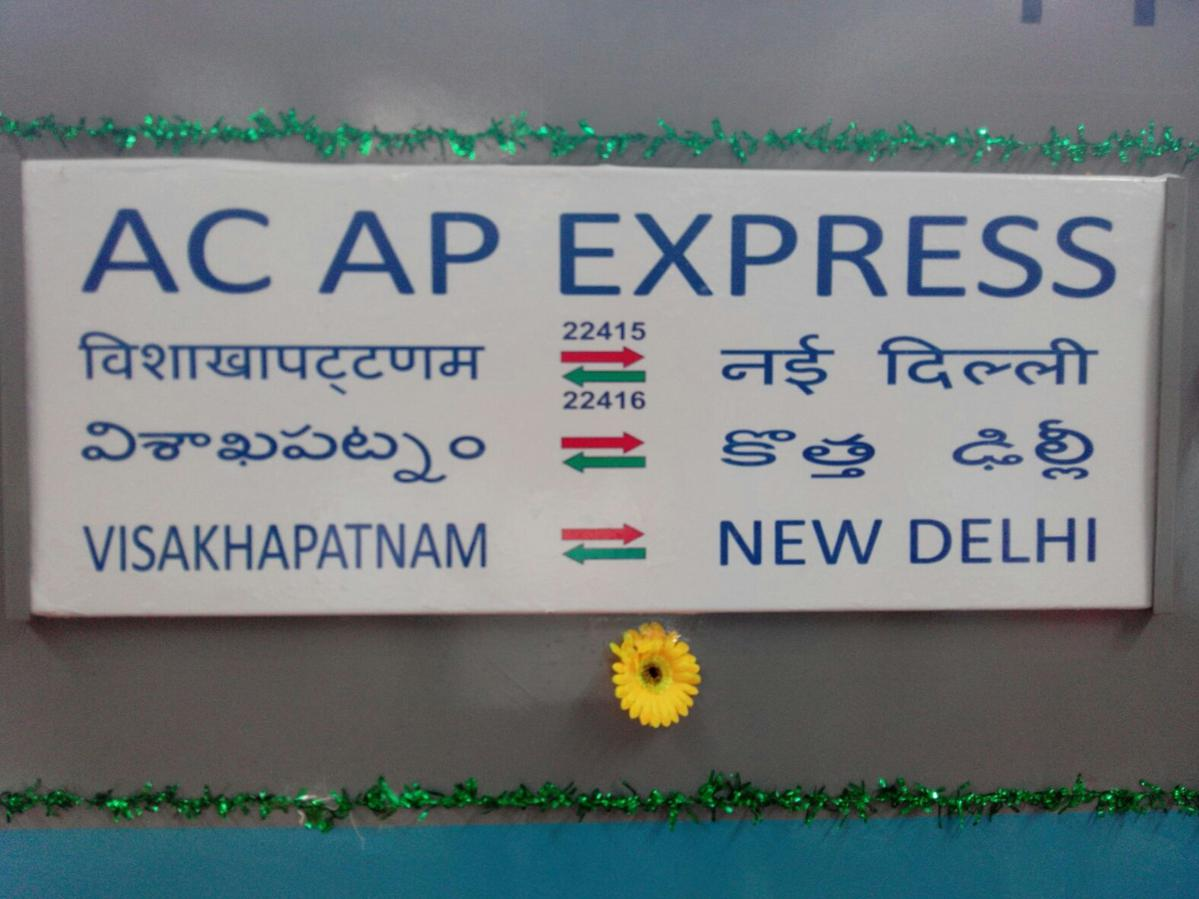
- Andhra Pradesh (A.P) Express train board

Overview
- Service type: Superfast Express
- Locale: Delhi, Haryana, Uttar Pradesh, Rajasthan Madhya Pradesh, Maharashtra, Telangana & Andhra Pradesh
- Predecessor: Andhra Pradesh Express
- First service: 12 August 2015; 11 years ago
- Current operator: South Coast Railway zone

Route
- Termini: New Delhi (NDLS); Visakhapatnam (VSKP)
- Stops: 19
- Distance travelled: 2,096 km (1,302 mi)
- Average journey time: 31 hours 40 minutes (20805); 32 hours 10 minutes (20806)
- Service frequency: Daily
- Train number: 20805 / 20806

On-board services
- Classes: 1 AC first class, 5 AC two tier, 7 AC three tier, 6 Sleeper class
- Seating arrangements: Yes
- Sleeping arrangements: Yes
- Catering facilities: Available
- Observation facilities: Large windows
- Baggage facilities: Available

Technical
- Rolling stock: LHB coach
- Track gauge: 1,676 mm (5 ft 6 in)
- Operating speed: 66 km/h (41 mph) Average Speed; 130 km/h (81 mph) Maximum Speed
Route map
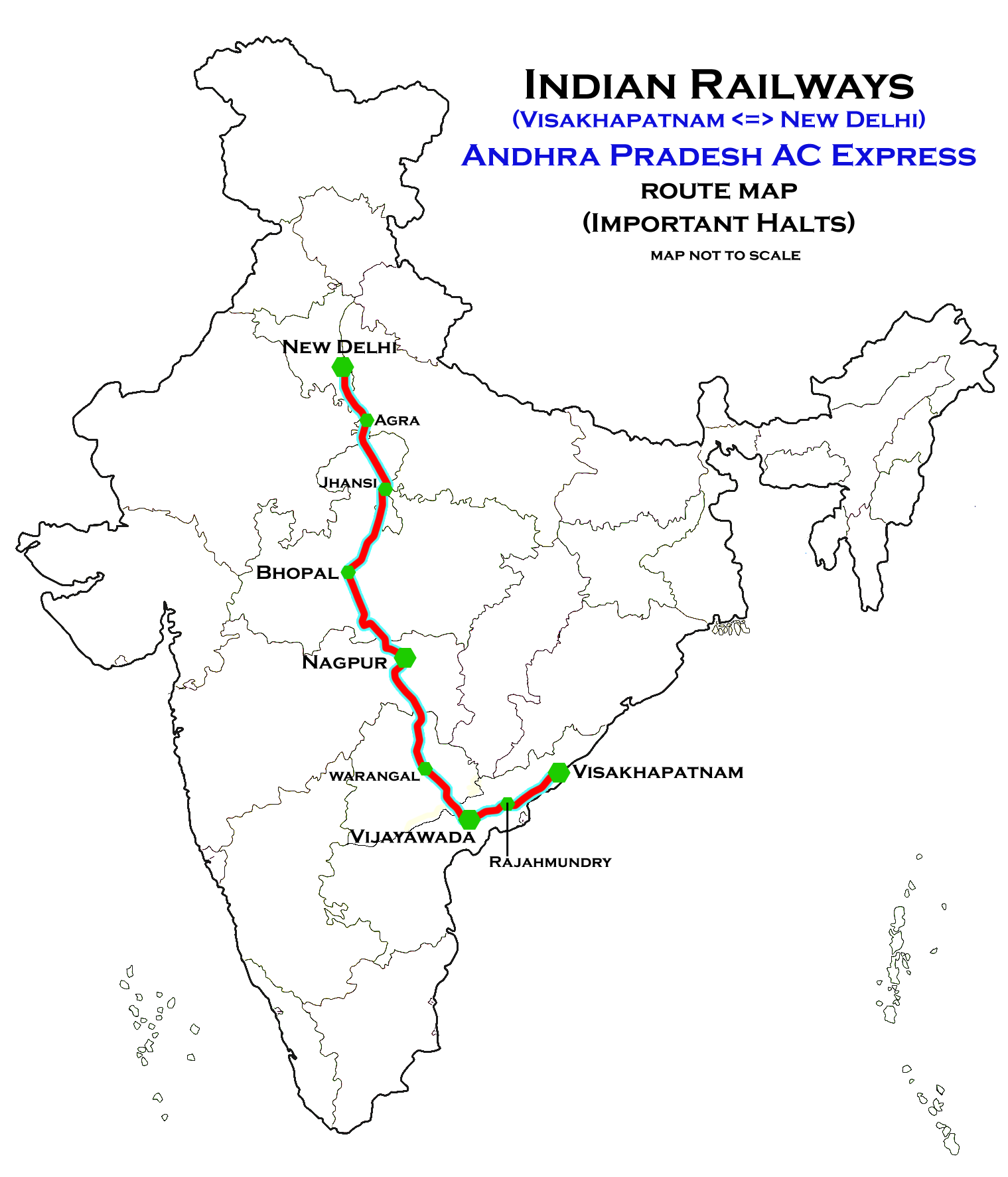

The Andhra Pradesh Express (Train numbers 20805 / 20806) is a daily Superfast Trains run by Indian Railways's South Coast Railway zone. It connects Visakhapatnam, the largest city in Andhra Pradesh, to India's capital, New Delhi. The train was first introduced in 2015 as the Andhra Pradesh AC Express. In 2020, Sleeper coaches were added, and it was renamed the Andhra Pradesh Express. Its name comes from the state of Andhra Pradesh. This is because, before the state of Telangana was formed, a train with the same name ran between Hyderabad (which was in combined Andhra Pradesh) and New Delhi. After the bifurcation, that train became the Telangana Express, and a new Andhra Pradesh Express with modern LHB coaches was started from Visakhapatnam.

It is the fastest and the only daily train between New Delhi and Visakhapatnam taking about 32.10 hours on average.

Also, it the fastest train between Delhi and Nagpur taking 14.25 hours while the Secunderabad Rajdhani Express, Chennai Rajdhani Express and Bangalore Rajdhani Express take 13.30 hours between Delhi and Nagpur.

== Operations ==
It is a train with LHB coach. The train runs daily, passing through the states of Haryana, Uttar Pradesh, Madhya Pradesh, Rajasthan, Maharashtra and Telangana, before reaching Andhra Pradesh. It has a single 1 AC first class coach, 5 AC 2 tier coaches, 7 AC 3 tier coaches, 6 Sleeper coaches, 1 AC pantry car and 2 guard cum generator cars. It starts from Visakhapatnam and reaches New Delhi by next day. Similarly, it starts from New Delhi and reaches Visakhapatnam on next day. The average speed of the train is 66 km/h (41 mph). Loco attached from Visakhapatnam to Vijayawada WAP-4 of Visakhapatnam/Vijayawada Shed or WAP-7 of Lallaguda/Visakhapatnam shed and Vijayawada shed to New Delhi WAP-4 or WAP-7 of Lallaguda/Ghaziabad shed.

Loco	1	2	3	4	5	6	7	8	9	10	11	12	13	14	15	16	17	18	19	20	21	22
	EOG2	S6	S5	S4	S3	S2	S1	B7	B6	B5	B4	B3	B2	B1	PC	A5	A4	A3	A2	A1	H1	EOG1

=== Schedule ===
Train runs daily from both the sides from 23.1.2020 in a new schedule and new train number with Sleeper coaches . There will be total 4 LHB rakes are dedicated to this train.

Train number	Station code	Departure station	Departure time	Arrival station	Arrival time
20805	VSKP	Visakhapatnam	10:00 pm (daily)	New Delhi	5:40 am (third day)
20806	NDLS	New Delhi	8:00 pm (daily)	Visakhapatnam	4:10 am (third day)

=== Reversals ===
Vijayawada Junction

=== Old schedule ===
Train used to run daily as AP AC Express from both the sides till January 22, 2020. There were total 4 rakes which were dedicated to this train.

Train number	Station code	Departure station	Departure time	Arrival station	Arrival time
22415	VSKP	Visakhapatnam	8:35 am (daily)	New Delhi	7:15 pm (next day)
22416	NDLS	New Delhi	6:25 am (daily)	Visakhapatnam	5:50 pm (next day)

== Route and halts ==
- New Delhi
- Agra Cantonment
- Gwalior Junction
- Jhansi Junction
- Bhopal Junction
- Nagpur Junction
- Chandrapur
- Balharshah Junction
- Sirpur Kaghaznagar
- Ramagundam
- Peddapalli Junction
- Warangal
- Khammam
- Vijayawada Junction
- Eluru
- Tadepalligudem
- Rajahmundry
- Samalkot Junction
- Anakapalle
- Duvvada
- Visakhapatnam

== Traction ==
Both trains are hauled by a Visakhapatnam Loco Shed / Lallaguda Loco Shed / Vijayawada Loco Shed based WAP-7 or WAP-4 electric locomotive from end to end.
