= Hval =

Hval is a surname. Notable people with the surname include:

- Jenny Hval (born 1980), Norwegian musician
- Jørgen Hval (1911–1992), Norwegian footballer

== Other ==
- Hval station, Railway station in Ringerike, Norway
- Hval (Ringerike)
- Hval's Codex, 1404 Bosnian illuminated manuscript
- Hval Sjokoladefabrikk, Norwegian confectionery company
