= Central Railway =

Central Railway or Central Railroad can refer to the following:

== Africa ==
- Central East African Railways, in Malawi
- Central South African Railways, in South Africa

== Asia ==
- Bombay, Baroda and Central India Railway, in India
- Central Asian Railway, also called the Trans-Caspian Railway, in Russia
- Central China Railway (華中鐵道股份有限公司, Huázhōng Tiědào Gǔfèn Yǒuxiàn Gōngsī), in east-central China
- Central Japan Railway Company (東海旅客鉄道株式会社, Tōkai Ryokaku Tetsudō Kabushiki-gaisha), in Chūbu (Nagoya) region, Japan
- Central Plains Metropolitan Region intercity railway, around Zhengzhou, China
- Central Railway (India), now the Indian Railways' Central Railway zone
- Central Railway Building, headquarters of the Bangladesh Railway, in India
- Central Salsette Tramway, also called the Salsette–Trombay Railway, in Mumbai, India
- Chennai Central–Bangalore City line, in India
- North Central Railway College, a school in Uttar Pradesh, India
- Sha Tin to Central Link, a rapid transit project in Hong Kong

== Europe ==
=== United Kingdom ===
- Anglesey Central Railway in Wales
- Belfast Central Railway, in Belfast, Northern Ireland
- Central London Railway, an underground railway in London, England
- Central Railway (UK), a proposed freight line
- Central railway station (London), in east London
- Central Trains, a train operating company
- Central Wales Extension Railway, in Wales
- Derry Central Railway, in County Londonderry, Northern Ireland
- East Fife Central Railway in Scotland
- Forest of Dean Central Railway, in Gloucestershire, England
- Glasgow Central Railway, in Scotland
- Great Central Railway
  - Great Central Railway, in England
  - Great Central Railway (heritage railway), in Leicestershire, England
  - Great Central Railway (Nottingham), in Nottinghamshire, England
  - Great Central Main Line, the historical route these companies follow(ed)
  - Great Western and Great Central Joint Railway, in south east England
  - Hull and Barnsley and Great Central Joint Railway, also called the Gowdall and Braithwell Railway, in England
- Isle of Wight Central Railway, in England
- Scottish Central Railway, in Scotland
- Waterford & Central Ireland Railway, in Northern Ireland

== Elsewhere ==
- Central Railway Metro station, in Sofia, Bulgaria
- Central Swabian Railway (Mittelschwabenbahn), in Bavaria, Germaqny
- Grand Crimean Central Railway, in Crimea, Russia
- Swiss Central Railway (Schweizerische Centralbahn), in Switzerland
- Württemberg Central Railway (Zentralbahn or Centralbahn), in Baden-Württemberg, Germany
- Zentralbahn, Switzerland

== North America ==
=== Canada ===
- Algoma Central Railway, in Ontario
- Canada Central Railway, in Ontario
- Cape Breton and Central Nova Scotia Railway, in Nova Scotia
- Central Maine and Quebec Railway, in Quebec and the Northeastern United States
- Central Manitoba Railway, in the Manitoba
- Central Ontario Railway, in Ontario
- Huron Central Railway, in Ontario
- Maine Central Railroad Company, in New Brunswick, Quebec, and the Northeastern United States
- Michigan Central Railroad, in Ontario and the Northern United States
- New York Central Railroad, in Ontario and the Northern United States
- Nipissing Central Railway, in Ontario
- Ottawa Central Railway, in Ontario
- Prairie Dog Central Railway, near Winnipeg, Manitoba
- Quebec Central Railway, in Quebec
- Waterloo Central Railway, in Ontario

=== Mexico ===
- Mexican Central Railway (Ferrocarril Central Mexicano)

=== United States ===
==== Alabama ====
- Alabama Central Railroad
- Central of Georgia Railway
- Illinois Central Railroad
- Illinois Central Gulf Railroad

==== Alaska ====
- Alaska Central Railroad

==== Arizona ====
- Arizona Central Railroad

==== Arkansas ====
- Illinois Central Railroad
- Illinois Central Gulf Railroad

==== California ====
- California Central Railway
- Central California Traction Company
- Central Oregon and Pacific Railroad
- Central Pacific Railroad

==== Colorado ====
- Argentine Central Railway
- Colorado Central Railroad

==== Connecticut ====
- Central New England Railway
- Central Vermont Railway
- New England Central Railroad

==== Delaware ====
- Delmarva Central Railroad

==== Florida ====
- Florida Central and Peninsular Railroad
- Florida Central Railroad (1868–1882)
- Florida Central Railroad (1907–1914)
- Florida Central Railroad (current)
- South Central Florida Railroad Florida

==== Georgia ====
- Central of Georgia Railway
- Georgia Central Railway

==== Illinois ====
- American Central Railway
- Central Illinois Railroad
- Chicago Central and Pacific Railroad
- Illinois Central Railroad
- Illinois Central Gulf Railroad
- Lee County Central Electric Railway
- Michigan Central Railroad
- New York Central Railroad
- Prairie Central Railway

==== Indiana ====
- Central Indiana and Western Railroad
- Central Railroad of Indiana
- Central Railroad of Indianapolis
- Illinois Central Railroad
- Illinois Central Gulf Railroad
- Indiana Central Railway
- Michigan Central Railroad
- New York Central Railroad

==== Iowa ====
- Central Iowa Railway Iowa
- Chicago Central and Pacific Railroad
- Illinois Central Railroad
- Illinois Central Gulf Railroad

==== Kansas ====
- Central Branch Union Pacific Railroad
- Central Kansas Railway

==== Kentucky ====
- Illinois Central Railroad
- Illinois Central Gulf Railroad

==== Louisiana ====
- Illinois Central Railroad
- Illinois Central Gulf Railroad

==== Maine ====
- Central Maine and Quebec Railway
- Maine Central Railroad Company

==== Maryland ====
- Delmarva Central Railroad
- Maryland Central Railroad
- Northern Central Railway
- Philadelphia and Baltimore Central Railroad
- West Virginia Central and Pittsburg Railway

==== Massachusetts ====
- Central Massachusetts Railroad
- Central New England Railway
- Central Vermont Railway
- New England Central Railroad
- New York Central Railroad

==== Michigan ====
- Central Michigan Railway
- Great Lakes Central Railroad
- Illinois Central Railroad
- Michigan Central Railroad
- New York Central Railroad

==== Mississippi ====
- Alabama Central Railroad
- Illinois Central Railroad
- Illinois Central Gulf Railroad
- Mississippi Central Railroad (1852-1874)
- Mississippi Central Railroad (1904-1967)

==== Missouri ====
- Central Midland Railway
- Illinois Central Railroad
- Illinois Central Gulf Railroad

==== Montana ====
- Central Montana Rail, Inc.
- Montana Central Railway

==== Nebraska ====
- Nebraska Central Railroad

==== Nevada ====
- Central Pacific Railroad
- Nevada Central Railroad

==== New Hampshire ====
- Central Vermont Railway
- Maine Central Railroad Company

==== New Jersey ====
- Central Railroad of New Jersey, also called the Jersey Central Railroad
- Jersey Central Traction Company
- New York Central Railroad

==== New York ====
- Central Branch (Long Island Rail Road)
- Central City Railway, in Syracuse
- Central New England Railway
- Central New York Railroad
- Central Vermont Railway
- New York Central Railroad
- Rockland Central Railroad

==== Ohio ====
- Central Ohio Railroad
- Central Railroad of Indiana
- New York Central Railroad
- Ohio Central Railroad (1988)
- Ohio Central Railroad System
- Toledo and Ohio Central Railway

==== Oklahoma ====
- Enid Central Railway
- North Central Oklahoma Railway
- Oklahoma Central Railway (1905-1914)
- Oklahoma Central Railroad (1914–1942)

==== Oregon ====
- Central Oregon and Pacific Railroad
- Columbia River and Oregon Central Railroad
- Oregon Central Rail Road

==== Pennsylvania ====
- Central New York Railroad
- Central Railroad of Pennsylvania
- Central Railroad of Pennsylvania (1891–1918)
- Central Railroad of New Jersey, also called the Jersey Central Railroad
- Maryland Central Railroad
- New York Central Railroad
- Northern Central Railway
- Ohio Central Railroad System
- Philadelphia and Baltimore Central Railroad

==== Tennessee ====
- Central of Tennessee Railway and Navigation Company
- Illinois Central Railroad
- Illinois Central Gulf Railroad
- Mississippi Central Railroad (1852-1874)
- Tennessee Central Railway

==== Texas ====
- Central Texas and Colorado River Railway
- Houston and Texas Central Railway
- Texas Central Railway

==== Utah ====
- Central Pacific Railroad
- Utah Central Railroad (1869–1881)
- Utah Central Railway (1992), in the Ogden area

==== Vermont ====
- Central Maine and Quebec Railway
- Central Vermont Railway
- Maine Central Railroad Company
- New England Central Railroad

==== Virginia ====
- Delmarva Central Railroad
- Virginia Central Railroad
- Virginia Central Railway

==== Washington ====
- Central Washington Railroad

==== West Virginia ====
- New York Central Railroad
- West Virginia Central and Pittsburg Railway

==== Wisconsin ====
- Wisconsin Central Railroad (1871–1899)
- Wisconsin Central Railway (1897–1954)
- Wisconsin Central Railroad (1954–1961)

==== Wyoming ====
- Colorado Central Railroad
- Wyoming Central Railway

== Oceania ==
- Central Australia Railway, in Australia
- Central Coast & Newcastle Line, a passenger route in New South Wales, Australia
- Central Highlands Tourist Railway, in Victoria, Australia
- Central Western railway line, Queensland, in Queensland, Australia
- Otago Central Railway, on the South Island of New Zealand

== South America ==
- Buenos Aires Central Railway (Ferrocarril Central Buenos Aires), in Argentina
- Central Argentine Railway, in Argentina
- Central Chubut Railway, in Argentina
- Central Entre Ríos Railway, in Entre Ríos Province, Argentina
- Central Northern Railway, in Argentina
- Central Uruguay Railway, in Uruguay
- Córdoba Central Railway, in Argentina
- Estrada de Ferro Central do Brasil (Central Railway of Brazil), in Brazil
- Ferrocarril Central Andino (Andean Central Railway), in Peru
- Nuevo Central Argentino, a train operating company in Argentina

== See also ==
- Central Railway Station (disambiguation)
- Central Line (disambiguation)
- Great Central Railway (disambiguation)
- Grand Central (disambiguation)
