= 1900 in the United Kingdom =

Events from the year 1900 in the United Kingdom.

== Incumbents ==
- Monarch – Victoria
- Prime Minister – Robert Gascoyne-Cecil, 3rd Marquess of Salisbury (Coalition)

== Events ==
=== January ===
- 3 January – Royal Yacht Victoria and Albert capsizes while being floated out of dry dock at Pembroke Dock on completion of her construction.
- 9 January – influenza outbreak in London.
- 24 January – Second Boer War: Boers repel British troops under General Sir Redvers Buller at the Battle of Spion Kop.
- 31 January – the Gramophone Company copyrights the His Master's Voice illustration.

=== February ===
- 5 February – the UK and the United States sign a treaty for the building of a Central American shipping canal through Nicaragua.
- 6 February – a House of Commons vote of censure over the government's handling of the Second Boer War is defeated by a majority of 213.
- 8 February – Second Boer War: British troops are defeated by Boers at Ladysmith, South Africa.
- 12 February – meeting held at Mile End in London to protest against the Boer War ends in an uproar.
- 14 February – Second Boer War: 20,000 British troops invade the Orange Free State in South Africa.

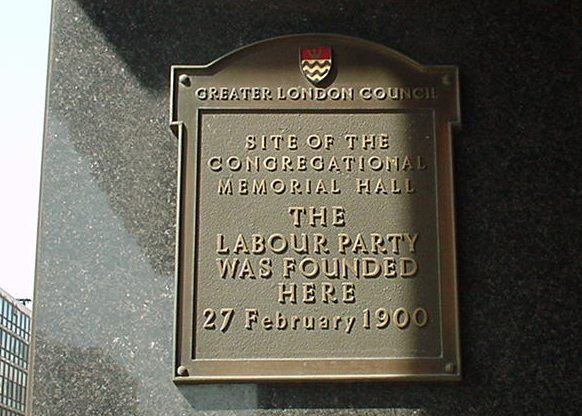
Plaque recording the location of the formation of the Labour Party

- 27 February
  - Second Boer War: British military leaders in South Africa receive an unconditional notice of surrender from Boer General Piet Cronjé.
  - Creation of the Labour Party; Ramsay MacDonald is appointed its first secretary.
- 28 February – Second Boer War: the 118-day Siege of Ladysmith is lifted.

=== March ===
- 3 March – official inauguration of the Boundary Estate, Shoreditch, London; Britain's first council estate to be commenced (10 years previously).
- March–September – War of the Golden Stool fought against the Ashanti Empire.

=== April ===
- 1 April – Irish Guards formed by Queen Victoria.
- 4 April
  - An anarchist shoots at the Prince of Wales during his visit to Belgium for the birthday celebrations of the King of Belgium.
  - Queen Victoria arrives in Dublin on her fourth and last visit to Ireland.
- 23 April–12 May – the Automobile Club of Great Britain stages a Thousand Mile Trial, a reliability motor rally over a circular route between London and Edinburgh.
- 24 April – the Daily Express newspaper is published for the first time.

=== May ===
- 14 May–28 October – Great Britain and Ireland compete at the Olympics in Paris and win 15 gold, 6 silver and 9 bronze medals.
- 17 May – Second Boer War: Siege of Mafeking ends.
- 18 May – the UK proclaims a protectorate over Tonga.

=== June ===
- 5 June – Second Boer War: British soldiers take Pretoria, South Africa.

=== July ===
- 19–21 July – Bernard Bosanquet first bowls a googly in first-class cricket, playing for Middlesex against Leicestershire at Lord's.
- 27 July – Louise, Princess Royal, a granddaughter of Queen Victoria, marries Alexander Duff, Earl of Fife, in the private chapel of Buckingham Palace, London; 2 days later he is created Duke of Fife, the last Dukedom created in Britain for a person who is not a son, grandson or consort of the Sovereign.
- 30 July
  - The Duke of Albany becomes Duke of Saxe-Coburg and Gotha as Carl Eduard following the death of his uncle, Duke Alfred, a son of Queen Victoria who is the third of the reigning monarch's children to die.
  - Mines (Prohibition of Child Labour Underground) Act prohibits children under the age of thirteen from working in mines.

=== August ===
- 8 August – Great Britain loses to the United States in the first Davis Cup tennis competition.
- 14 August – an international contingent of troops under British command invades Peking and frees Europeans taken hostage during the Boxer Rebellion.
- 27 August – British defeat Boer commandos at Bergendal.

=== September ===
- 3 September – West Bromwich Albion F.C. move into The Hawthorns, a new stadium on the border of West Bromwich and Handsworth.
- 12 September – The Prince of Wales's horse Diamond Jubilee completes the English Triple Crown by finishing first in the 2,000 Guineas, Epsom Derby and St Leger, ridden by Herbert Jones.

=== October ===
- 3 October – Edward Elgar's choral work The Dream of Gerontius receives its first performance, in Birmingham Town Hall.
- 25 October – Second Boer War: United Kingdom annexes Transvaal.

=== November ===
- 22–14 November 1903 – strike of Welsh slate workers at Penrhyn Quarry.

=== December ===
- 3 December – the Conservative Party under Lord Salisbury wins the 'Khaki' general election. Winston Churchill becomes a Member of Parliament for the first time, elected for Oldham; and two Labour candidates are successful: Keir Hardie in Merthyr Tydfil and Richard Bell in Derby.
- 15 December – the three lighthouse keepers on Flannan Isle disappear without a trace
- 28 December – the Liverpool barque Primrose Hill is wrecked on South Stack off Holyhead with the loss of 33 lives.
- 31 December – a storm causes a stone and a lintel to fall at Stonehenge; they are restored in 1958.

=== Undated ===
- Beer Scare: beer drinkers in North West England suffer poisoning from arsenic in brewing sugars: 6,000 people affected and 70 killed.
- Associated Portland Cement Manufacturers formed by the amalgamation of 24 cement companies.
- William Harbutt of Bathampton begins commercial production of Plasticine modelling clay.

== Publications ==
- Ernest Bramah's oriental fantasy stories The Wallet of Kai Lung.
- Joseph Conrad's novel Lord Jim.
- Maurice Hewlett's historical novel The Life and Death of Richard Yea-and-Nay.
- Gertrude Jekyll's book Home and Garden: notes and thoughts, practical and critical, of a worker in both.
- Arthur Quiller-Couch's anthology The Oxford Book of English Verse 1250–1900.
- H. G. Wells' novel Love and Mr Lewisham.

== Births ==
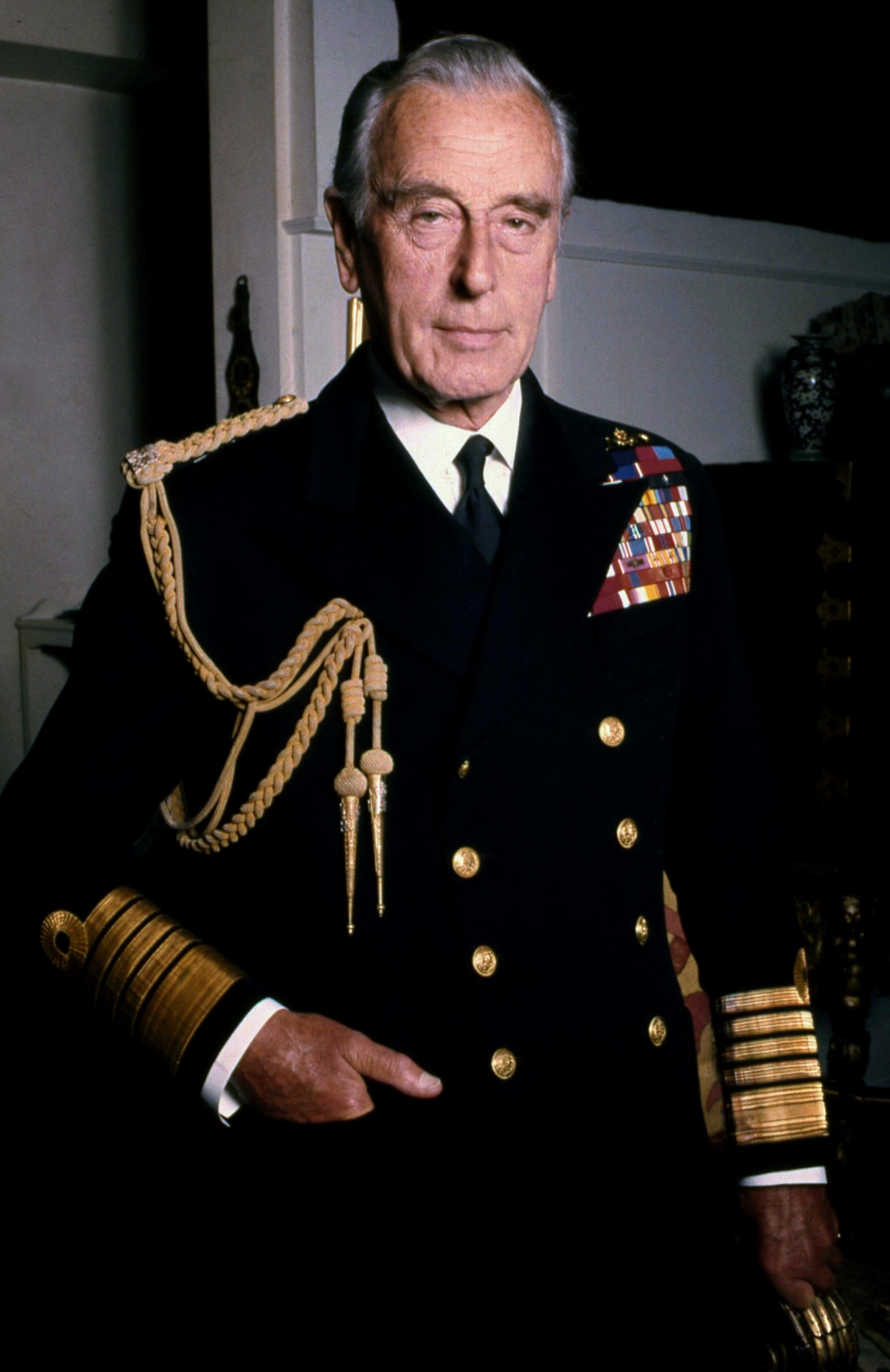
Louis Mountbatten, 1st Earl Mountbatten of Burma

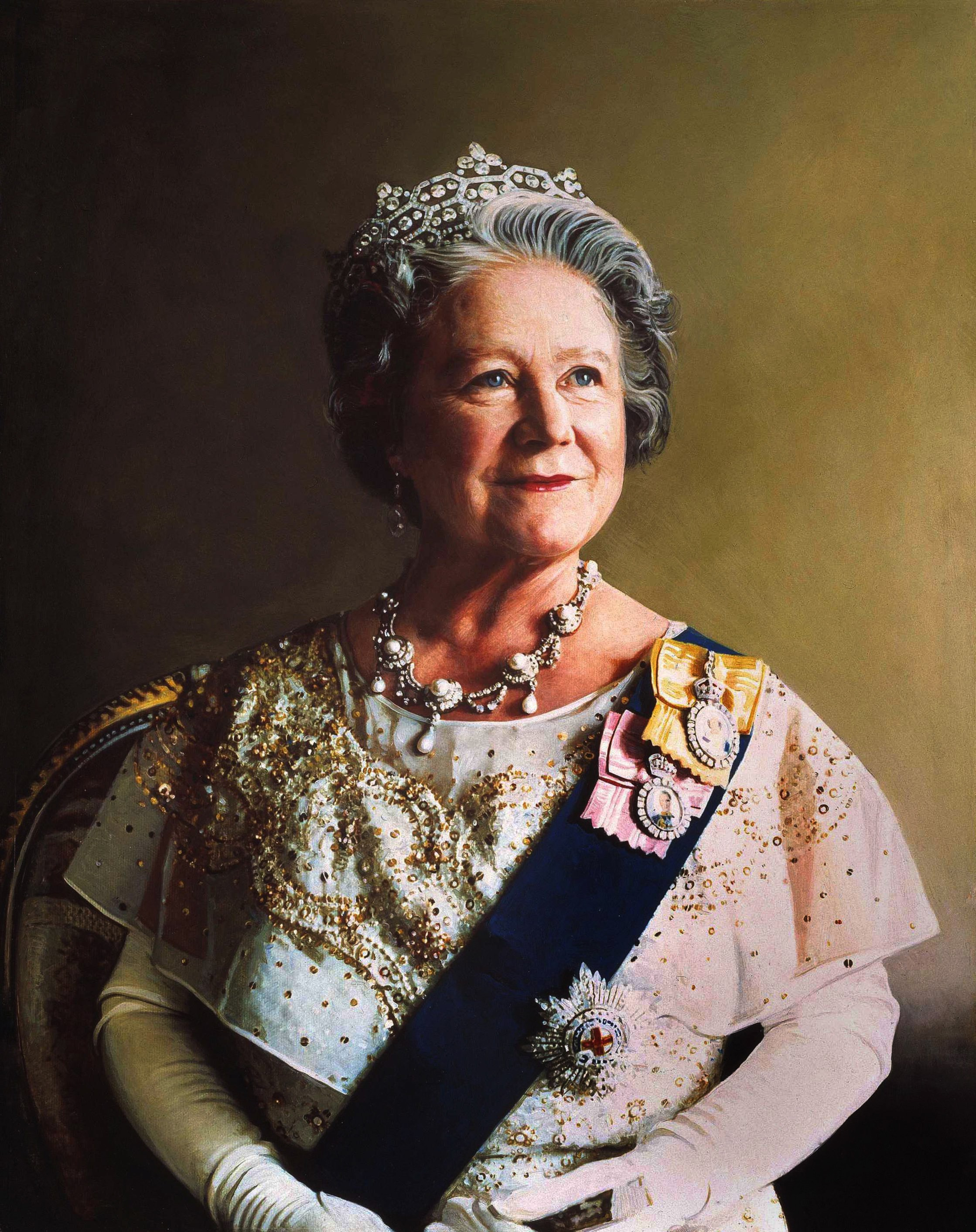
Queen Elizabeth The Queen Mother

- 1 January
  - Roger Maxwell, film actor (died 1971)
  - Lillian Rich, silent film actress (died 1954)
- 2 January – Una Ledingham, physician, specialist in diabetes mellitus and pregnancy (died 1965)
- 4 January – William Young, World War I veteran (died 2007)
- 9 January – Eve Garnett, writer and illustrator (died 1991)
- 20 January – Dorothy Annan, painter, potter and muralist (died 1983)
- 23 January – William Ifor Jones, composer (died 1988)
- 6 February – Guy Warrack, Scottish-born conductor (died 1986)
- 12 February
  - Robert Boothby, politician (died 1986)
  - Fred Emney, comic performer (died 1980)
- 20 February – Bernard Knowles, cinematographer and screenwriter (died 1975)
- 1 March – Keith Falkner, singer and director of the Royal College of Music (died 1994)
- 3 March
  - Edna Best, stage, film and early television actress (died 1974 in Switzerland)
  - Basil Bunting, modernist poet (died 1985)
- 15 March – Frances Partridge, writer (died 2004)
- 29 March – Margaret Sinclair, Scottish-born nun (died 1925)
- 31 March – Prince Henry, Duke of Gloucester (died 1974)
- 3 April – Albert Ingham, mathematician (died 1967)
- 9 April – Mary Potter, painter (died 1981)
- 19 April – Richard Hughes, novelist (died 1976)
- 22 April – Nellie Beer, Conservative politician, Lord Mayor of Manchester (died 1988)
- 24 April – Elizabeth Goudge, novelist (died 1984)
- 25 April – Gladwyn Jebb, acting Secretary-General of the UN (died 1996)
- 30 April – Cecily Lefort, World War II heroine, spy for SOE (executed 1945 in Germany)
- 2 May – A. W. Lawrence, Classical archaeologist (died 1991)
- 5 May – Harold Tamblyn-Watts, comic strip artist (died 1999)
- 10 May – Cecilia Payne-Gaposchkin, astronomer and astrophysicist (died 1979 in the United States)
- 27 May – Ethel Lang, supercentenarian (died 2015)
- 29 May – David Maxwell Fyfe, 1st Earl of Kilmuir, Scottish-born politician, lawyer and judge, Lord Chancellor (died 1967)
- 30 May – Gerald Gardiner, Lord Chancellor (died 1990)
- 6 June
  - Arthur Askey, comedian (died 1982)
  - Lester Matthews, actor (died 1975)
- 17 June – Evelyn Irons, Scottish-born journalist, war correspondent (died 2000)
- 25 June
  - Philip D'Arcy Hart, medical researcher, pioneer in tuberculosis treatment (died 2006)
  - Louis Mountbatten, 1st Earl Mountbatten of Burma, Admiral of the Fleet and last Viceroy of India (assassinated 1979 in Ireland)
- 26 June – John Benham, 400m runner (died 1990)
- 30 June – James Stagg, Scottish-born meteorologist (died 1975)
- 2 July
  - Tyrone Guthrie, theatre director (died 1971 in Ireland)
  - Sophie Harris, theatre and opera costume and scenic designer (died 1966)
- 10 July – Evelyn Laye, actress (died 1996)
- 4 August – Elizabeth Bowes-Lyon, queen consort of George VI and later Queen Elizabeth The Queen Mother (died 2002)
- 17 August – Vivienne de Watteville, adventurer (died 1957)
- 19 August – Gilbert Ryle, philosopher (died 1976)
- 23 August – Bella Reay, footballer (died 1979)
- 25 August – Isobel Hogg Kerr Beattie, Scottish architect (died 1970)
- 27 August – Frank Moody, Welsh boxer (died 1963)
- 31 August – Roland Culver, actor (died 1984)
- 4 September – Maxwell Knight, spymaster and naturalist (died 1968)
- 8 September – Tilly Devine, organised crime boss (died 1970 in Australia)
- 9 September – James Hilton, novelist and screenwriter (died 1954 in the United States)
- 11 September – Jimmy Brain, footballer (died 1971)
- 12 September – Eric Thiman, composer (died 1975)
- 1 October – Tom Goddard, cricketer (died 1966)
- 2 October – Isabella Forshall, paediatric surgeon (died 1989)
- 6 October – Stan Nichols, cricketer (died 1961)
- 8 October – Geoffrey Jellicoe, landscape architect (died 1996)
- 9 October – Alastair Sim, character actor (died 1976)
- 14 October – Roland Penrose, Surrealist painter and art collector (died 1984)
- 16 October – Edward Ardizzone, painter, printmaker and author (born in Vietnam; died 1979)
- 5 November – Ethelwynn Trewavas, ichthyologist (died 1993)
- 18 November – Mercedes Gleitze, distance swimmer (died 1981)
- 20 November – Helen Bradley, painter (died 1979)
- 22 November – Tom Macdonald, Welsh journalist and novelist (died 1980)
- 30 November – Geoffrey Household, novelist (died 1988)
- 4 December – John Axon, railwayman hero (killed in accident 1957)
- 16 December – V. S. Pritchett, short story writer (died 1997)
- 17 December – Mary Cartwright, mathematician (died 1998)
- 22 December – Alan Bush, pianist, composer and conductor (died 1995)
- 26 December – Evelyn Bark, humanitarian, leading member of the Red Cross, first female recipient of the CMG (died 1993)
- Robina Addis, psychiatric social worker (died 1986)
- Saira Elizabeth Luiza Shah, born Elizabeth Louise MacKenzie, Scottish writer as Morag Murray Abdullah (died 1960)

== Deaths ==
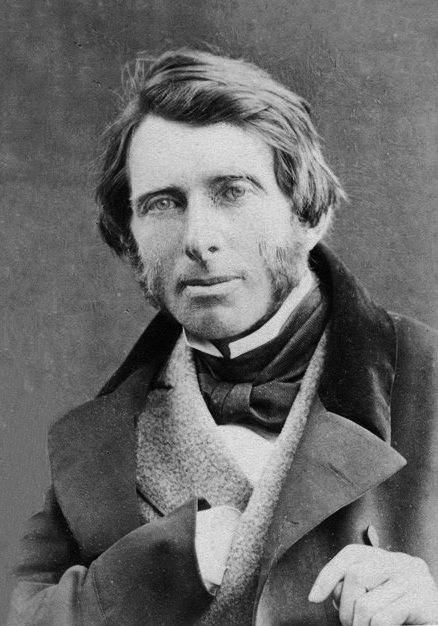
John Ruskin

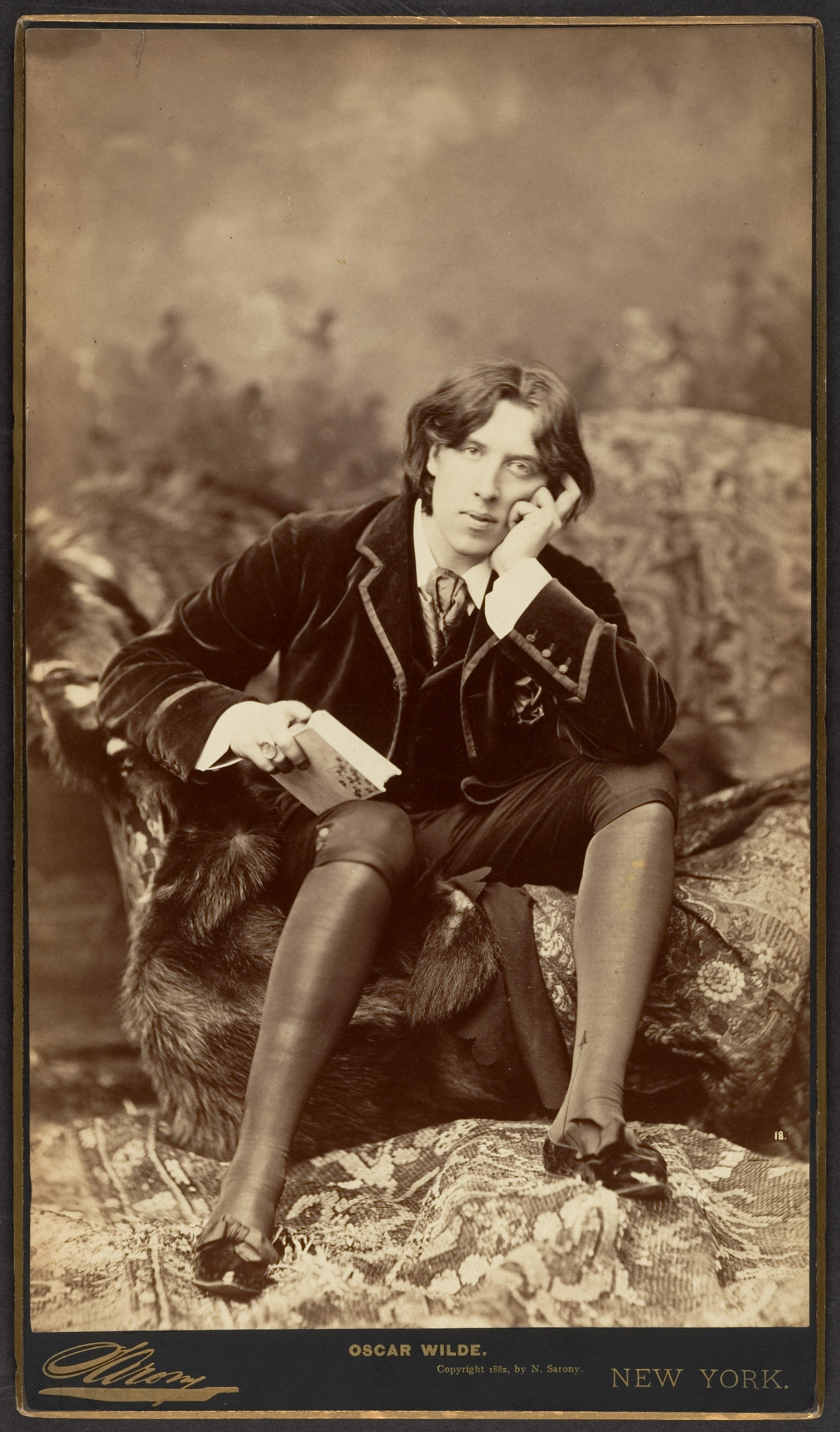
Oscar Wilde

- 20 January
  - R. D. Blackmore, novelist (born 1825)
  - John Ruskin, writer and social critic (born 1819)
- 21 January – Francis, Duke of Teck, a cousin-in-law of Queen Victoria (born 1837)
- 22 January – David Edward Hughes, musician and professor of music (born 1831)
- 31 January – John Sholto Douglas, 9th Marquess of Queensberry, nobleman and boxer (born 1844)
- 6 February – Sir William Wilson Hunter, colonial administrator, statistician and historian (born 1840 in Scotland)
- 23 February
  - William Butterfield, architect (born 1814)
  - Ernest Dowson, poet (born 1867)
- 6 March – Ada Williams, baby farmer and murderer, hanged (born c.1875)
- 10 March – George James Symons, meteorologist (born 1838)
- 16 March – Sir Frederic William Burton, painter and curator (born 1816 in Ireland)
- 24 April – George Douglas Campbell, 8th Duke of Argyll, politician (born 1823)
- 4 May – Augustus Pitt Rivers, ethnologist and archaeologist (born 1827)
- 12 May – Frederika Perceval, last surviving child of assassinated Prime Minister Spencer Perceval (born 1805)
- 28 May – Sir George Grove, writer on music and the Bible and civil engineer (born 1820)
- 3 June – Mary Kingsley, explorer, in Cape Colony (born 1862)
- 14 June – Catherine Gladstone, widow of Prime Minister W. E. Gladstone and philanthropist (born 1812)
- 30 July – Alfred, Duke of Saxe-Coburg and Gotha (Duke of Edinburgh), second eldest son of Queen Victoria, in Germany (born 1844)
- 28 August – Henry Sidgwick, philosopher (born 1838)
- 31 August – Sir John Bennet Lawes, agricultural scientist (born 1814)
- 19 September – Anne Beale, novelist (born 1816)
- 9 October – John Crichton-Stuart, 3rd Marquess of Bute, landed aristocrat, industrial magnate, antiquarian, scholar, philanthropist and architectural patron (born 1847)
- 16 October – Sir Henry Acland, physician (born 1815)
- 22 November – Sir Arthur Sullivan, composer (born 1842)
- 29 December – John Henry Leech, entomologist (born 1862)
- 30 November – Oscar Wilde, playwright, writer and poet, in France (born 1854 in Ireland)

== See also ==
- List of British films before 1920
