= Timeline of train radio in Norway =

The Norwegian railway network has used two types of train radio, Scanet and GSM-R. A train radio is a mobile telecommunications network that allows a train driver, maintenance crews and other rail transport officials to communicate with a dispatcher or each other. Scanet was an analog radio system installed on the main lines, limited to electrified lines with automatic train protection, between 1995 and 1999. The implementation left out many lines, which were instead covered by Nordic Mobile Telephone (NMT 450) network.

The lack of a train radio on the Røros Line was a contributing factor to the Åsta accident. This spurred the demand for full coverage. At the same time, the European Union required new systems to use the GSM-R standard, which will be implemented throughout Europe. GSM-R was rolled out between 2004 and 2007 and covers almost the entire network. It was also built to have 100% coverage in all tunnels, which was not achieved with Scanet. GSM-R was first rolled out on lines without Scanet, and then replaced the older system right-out. Both Scanet and GSM-R consist of mobile station in the trains, base stations along the track, and a core network connected to the central traffic control centers. The implementation of GSM-R cost 1.8 billion Norwegian krone.

== List ==
The following is a list of all railway lines with train radio. It includes the date of opening of the train radio, including the affected section, and the standard used. Freight-only lines are excluded from the list, even if they may have had Scanet or have GSM-R.

Date	Line	Section	System
7 May 1995	Sørlandet	Drammen–Hokksund	Scanet
7 May 1995	Randsfjorden	Hokksund–Hønefoss	Scanet
17 December 1996	Sørlandet	Sira–Stavanger	Scanet
7 May 1997	Drammen	Oslo S – Drammen	Scanet
7 May 1997	Bergen	Hønefoss–Bergen	Scanet
16 May 1997	Sørlandet	Hokksund–Kristiansand	Scanet
17 December 1997	Sørlandet	Kristiansand–Stavanger	Scanet
9 July 1998	Gjøvik	Oslo S – Roa	Scanet
9 July 1998	Roa–Hønefoss	Roa–Hønefoss	Scanet
9 July 1998	Østfold	Oslo S – Kornsjø	Scanet
9 July 1998	Trunk	Lillestrøm–Eidsvoll	Scanet
9 July 1998	Dovre	Eidsvoll–Trondheim	Scanet
9 July 1998	Kongsvinger	Lillestrøm–Magnor	Scanet
9 July 1998	Vestfold	Drammen–Porsgrunn	Scanet
9 July 1998	Bratsberg	Nordagutu–Porsgrunn	Scanet
8 October 1998	Gardermoen	Lillestrøm–Eidsvoll	Scanet
22 August 1999	Gardermoen	Oslo S – Lillestrøm	Scanet
15 May 2004	Nordland	Rognan–Bodø	GSM-R
1 December 2004	Nordland	Trondheim S – Rognan	GSM-R
1 December 2004	Meråker	Hell–Storlien	GSM-R
1 December 2004	Stavne–Leangen	Stavne–Leangen	GSM-R
1 December 2004	Røros	Hamar–Støren	GSM-R
1 December 2004	Dovre	Dombås – Trondheim S	GSM-R
1 May 2005	Flåm	Myrdal–Flåm	GSM-R
1 November 2005	Gjøvik	Roa–Gjøvik	GSM-R
1 November 2005	Eastern Østfold	Ski–Sarpsborg	GSM-R
2 January 2007	Østfold	Oslo S – Kornsjø	GSM-R
2 January 2007	Gardermoen	Oslo S – Eidsvoll	GSM-R
2 January 2007	Trunk	Oslo S – Eidsvoll	GSM-R
2 January 2007	Kongsvinger	Lillestrøm–Charlottenberg	GSM-R
2 January 2007	Dovre	Eidsvoll–Dombås	GSM-R
2 January 2007	Gjøvik	Oslo S – Roa	GSM-R
2 January 2007	Drammen	Oslo S – Drammen	GSM-R
2 January 2007	Asker	Sandvika–Asker	GSM-R
2 January 2007	Spikkestad	Asker–Spikkestad	GSM-R
2 January 2007	Sørlandet	Drammen–Stavanger	GSM-R
2 January 2007	Randsfjorden	Drammen–Hønefoss	GSM-R
2 January 2007	Bergen	Hønefoss–Bergen	GSM-R
2 January 2007	Roa–Hønefoss	Roa–Hønefoss	GSM-R
2 January 2007	Vestfold	Drammen–Porsgrunn	GSM-R
2 January 2007	Bratsberg	Nordagutu–Porsgrunn	GSM-R
