= Hval station =

Railway station in Ringerike, Norway

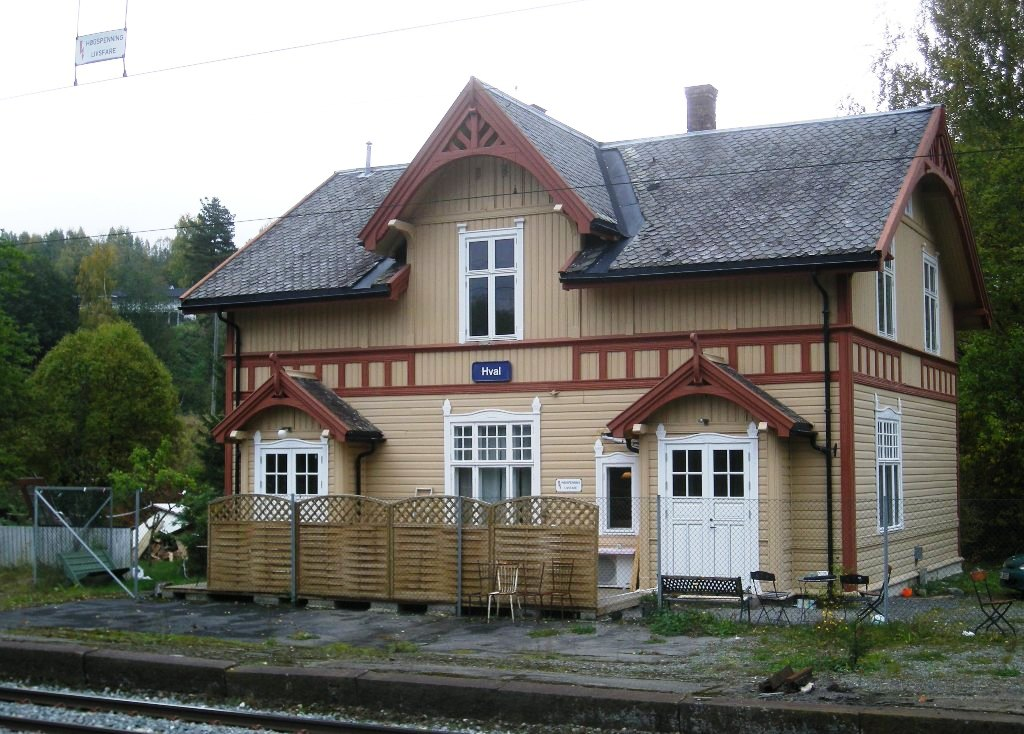
- Hval station in 2010

General information
- Location: Ringerike; Norway
- Coordinates: 60°11′18″N 10°18′23″E
- Distance: 85.42 km (53.08 mi)

History
- Opened: 1 December 1909
- Closed: 1 November 1990
Location

Hval station (Hval stasjon) is a railroad station on the Roa–Hønefoss Line, near Hval in Ringerike, Buskerud, Norway. The station opened in 1909 when the Bergen Railway was expanded from Hønefoss to Roa.

In the 1950s and 60s the station was important for the military staff working at Hvalsmoen and Eggemoen, both of which lay nearby. In 1973 the station became remote controlled. Passenger traffic ended on 1 November 1990, after the remote traffic to Bergen started to go through Drammen instead. Today the station is used as crossing tracks, but it also has separate side tracks. The station building is of the Sirnes-type, has drying loft and is protected.

== Station details ==
Hval station
Elevation	91.6 mabmsl
Architect	Paul Armin Due
