= Hval (Ringerike) =

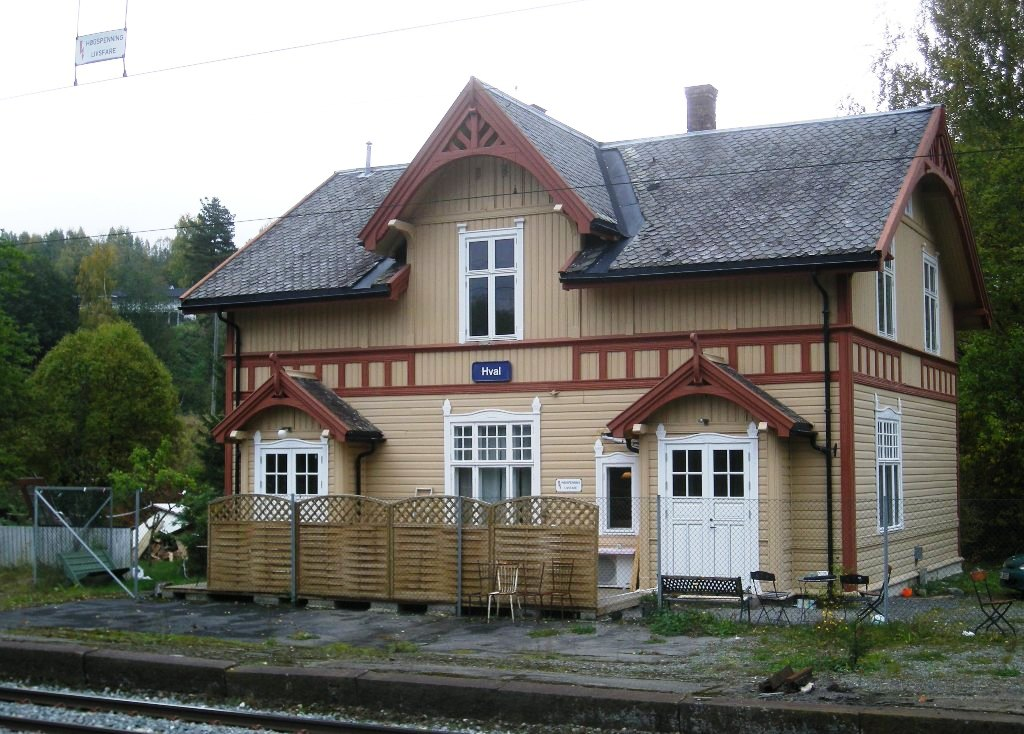
Hval Station on the Roa–Hønefoss Line

Hval is a village in Ringerike in Buskerud, Norway. The area lies north of Haugsbygd and east of Hønefoss. The old road Hvalsveien runs from Haugsbygd to Hval station, where it changes into Viulsveien in a junction between Hvalsmoveien (E16) and Viul.

Hval existed as a farm in the area since the early Middle Ages. In the 17th century the farm was split into several lesser farms including Nedre Hval and Søndre Hval. In the area lies both the former military camp of Hvalsmoen and the now closed Hval station.

In 1893 the Norwegian Storting decided to acquire the area around Hvalsmoen, as a drill ground for the Royal Norwegian Army Engineering Regiment (Den kongelige norske ingeniørbrigade). When the Bergen Railway was extended from Hønefoss to Roa in 1909, Hval station was built on the Roa–Hønefoss Line (Roa-Hønefosslinjen). The station was built based upon designs of architect Paul Armin Due. The station had significance for the military personnel at nearby Hvalsmoen. Passenger traffic stopped during 1990. The station is currently operative as crossing tracks. The station building is of the Sirnes-type, and is protected. Hvalsmoen military camp was operative for over 100 years before it closed down in 2001.
