= Central Station =

Central station is a common name for a railway station.

Central Station may also refer to:

== Railway stations ==
=== Africa ===
- Maputo Central Railway Station, Mozambique

=== Asia ===
==== Hong Kong ====
- Central station (MTR), on the MTR metro system

==== India ====
- Central metro station (Kolkata), on the Blue Line of the Kolkata Metro
- Central Park metro station, on the Green Line of the Kolkata Metro
- Chennai Central railway station
  - Chennai Central metro station
- Mangalore Central railway station
- Mumbai Central railway station
  - Mumbai Central metro station

==== Japan ====
- Kagoshima-Chūō Station

==== Malaysia ====
- Kuala Lumpur Central Railway Station (LRT, MRT, Airport Line, bus and monorail)
- Putrajaya Central Station (MRT, Airport Line, bus and proposed tram)
- Kepong Central Station (Commuter and MRT)
- Penang Central Station (Bus, ferry and proposed LRT and HSR)
- Johor Bahru Central Railway Station (RTS, BRT, bus and CIQ to Singapore)
- Kwasa Sentral MRT station (MRT and bus hub)

==== Philippines ====
- Central Terminal station (Line 1), in Manila

==== Taiwan ====
- Central Signal railway station, in Shihzih Township, Pingtung County

==== Thailand ====
- Krung Thep Aphiwat Central Terminal, also known as Bang Sue Grand Station, the current central station of Bangkok
- Hua Lamphong railway station, the former central station of Bangkok until 19 January 2023

=== Europe ===
==== Belgium ====
- Antwerpen-Centraal railway station, in Antwerp
- Brussels Central Station

==== Denmark ====
- Aarhus Central Station, in Aarhus
- Copenhagen Central Station, in Copenhagen

==== Finland ====
- Helsinki Central railway station
- Central Railway Station metro station (Helsinki)

==== Netherlands ====
- Amsterdam Centraal station
- Amersfoort Centraal railway station
- Arnhem Centraal railway station
- Den Haag Centraal railway station (line E)
- Eindhoven Centraal railway station
- Leiden Centraal railway station
- Rotterdam Centraal station (lines D and E)
- Utrecht Centraal railway station

==== Norway ====
- Oslo Central Station, in Oslo
- Trondheim Central Station, in Trondheim

==== United Kingdom ====
- Belfast Central railway station, now named Lanyon Place railway station
- Belfast Grand Central station
- Birkenhead Central railway station
- Burnley Central railway station
- Cardiff Central railway station
- Central railway station (London), closed
- Coatbridge Central railway station
- Dumbarton Central railway station
- Exeter Central railway station
- Finchley Central tube station
- Folkestone Central railway station
- Gainsborough Central railway station
- Glasgow Central station
- Gravesend railway station, once called Gravesend Central
- Greenock Central railway station
- Hackney Central railway station
- Hamilton Central railway station
- Heathrow Central railway station
- Helensburgh Central railway station
- Hendon Central tube station
- Hounslow Central tube station
- Hyde Central railway station
- Leicester Central railway station
- Lincoln Central railway station
- Liverpool Central railway station
- Manchester Central railway station
- Milton Keynes Central railway station
- New Mills Central railway station
- Newcastle railway station, formerly Newcastle Central
  - Central Station Metro station (Tyne and Wear Metro)
- Partick Central railway station, (closed)
- Redcar Central railway station
- Rugby Central railway station, (closed)
- Rotherham Central railway station
- St Helens Central railway station
- St Helens Central (GCR) railway station
- Southend Central railway station
- Southampton Central railway station
- Telford Central railway station
- Tunbridge Wells railway station, once called Tunbridge Wells Central
- Walthamstow Central station
- Warrington Central railway station
- Wembley Central station
- Windsor & Eton Central railway station
- Wrexham Central railway station

=== North America ===
==== Canada ====
- Central station (Edmonton), Alberta
- Coquitlam Central station, British Columbia
- Kitchener Central Station, Ontario
- Ottawa Central Station, a former intercity bus station (closed 2021 and demolished)
- Montreal Central Station, Quebec
- Pacific Central Station, Vancouver, British Columbia
- Surrey Central station, British Columbia

==== Cuba ====
- Havana Central railway station

==== Mexico ====
- Central metro station (Monterrey)
- Eje Central metro station, Mexico City

==== United States ====
===== Arizona =====
- Central Station, in Phoenix

===== California =====
- Central Station (Los Angeles), in Los Angeles

===== Florida =====
- Central station (Jacksonville), in Jacksonville

===== Illinois =====
- Central Station, Chicago, a neighborhood in Chicago
  - Central Station (Chicago terminal), in Chicago
  - Central station (CTA Green Line), in Chicago
  - Central station (CTA Congress Line), in Chicago
  - Central station (CTA Purple Line), in Evanston
  - Grand Central Station (Chicago), a station for Baltimore and Ohio and other railroads, to 1969
  - Great Central Station, a station in Chicago for Illinois Central and other railroads in the latter half of the nineteenth century

===== Kentucky =====
- Central Station (Louisville), in Louisville

===== Massachusetts =====
- South Station, in Boston, (at one point called South Central Station)
- Central Station, a proposed station in Boston
- Central station (MBTA), in Cambridge
- Central Avenue station (MBTA), in Milton

===== Minnesota =====
- Central station (Metro Transit), in St. Paul

===== Michigan =====
- Michigan Central Station, in Detroit

===== New York =====
- Buffalo Central Terminal, in Buffalo
- Grand Central Terminal, in New York City
- Central Avenue station (BMT Myrtle Avenue Line), in Brooklyn

===== Tennessee =====
- Memphis Central Station, in Memphis

===== Texas =====
- Fort Worth Central Station, in Fort Worth
- Central Station (Houston), in Houston

=== Oceania ===
==== Australia ====
- Central railway station, Brisbane
- Central railway station, Sydney
- Gawler Central railway station, Adelaide
- Melbourne Central railway station
- Springfield Central railway station, Ipswich
- Wynnum Central railway station, Brisbane

=== South America ===
==== Argentina ====
- Central Station (Buenos Aires), former railway station

==== Brazil ====
- Central station (Belo Horizonte Metro)
- Central station (Federal District Metro)

== Other structures and establishments ==
- Central Station (Sebring, Florida), U.S., a historic fire station
- Central Police Station (Hong Kong) or Tai Kwun, a cultural and shopping destination
- Alarm monitoring center, also called a central monitoring station
- Power stations used to be referred to as central stations, particularly in the US
- Central Station (gay club, Moscow, Russia), a bar and night club in Moscow
- Central Station (gay club, Saint-Petersburg, Russia), a bar and night club in Saint Petersburg

== Arts and media ==
- Central Station (film), a 1998 Brazilian film by Walter Salles
- Central Station (online service), a network gaming portal for the PlayStation 2
- "Central Station", a song by May-a from the 2021 EP Don't Kiss Ur Friends
- "Central Station", a song by the Boat People from the 2005 album Yesyesyesyesyes
- "Central Station", a song by Skipping Girl Vinegar from the 2011 album Keep Calm Carry the Monkey
- Central Station, a 2016 novel by Lavie Tidhar
- Central Station Records, an Australian dance music label

== Other uses ==
- Central Station, Chicago, a neighborhood in Chicago
- Central Station Design, a design company in Manchester, England

== See also ==
- Central Bus Station (disambiguation), a list of bus stations containing the word "Central"
- Grand Central Station (disambiguation)
- Central Terminal (disambiguation)
