= Grand Central =

Grand Central may refer to:

== Buildings ==
- Grand Central (store), former discount department store bought out by Fred Meyer in 1984
- Grand Central, Birmingham, a shopping centre that is part of New Street railway station in Birmingham, England
- Grand Central, Manchester, a public house in Manchester, England
- Grand Central Hall, a building in Liverpool, England
- Grand Central Hotel Belfast, two hotels in Belfast, Northern Ireland
- Grand Central Stockport, entertainment and leisure complex in Greater Manchester, England
- Unite Grand Central, student halls of residence in Liverpool

== Transportation ==
- Grand Central Terminal, train terminal in Manhattan, New York City:
  - Grand Central Madison station, a Long Island Rail Road station complex under Grand Central Terminal
  - Grand Central–42nd Street (New York City Subway), a New York City Subway station complex adjacent to Grand Central Terminal, consisting of:
    - Grand Central – 42nd Street (IRT Lexington Avenue Line), serving the 4, 5, 6, and <6> trains
    - Grand Central (IRT Flushing Line), serving the 7 and <7> trains
    - Grand Central (IRT 42nd Street Shuttle), serving the S (42nd Street Shuttle) train
- Grand Central (train operating company), British train operator running services between London, and Sunderland and Bradford
- Grand Central Airport, Midrand, South Africa
- Grand Central Airport (California), United States
- Grand Central Parkway, Queens, New York City
- Grand Central Station (Chicago), former train station in Chicago, Illinois
- Grand Central tram stop, Birmingham, England
- Belfast Grand Central station, County Antrim, Northern Ireland

== Other uses ==
- Grand Central, St. Petersburg, Florida, a district
- Grand Central (film), a 2013 French film
- Grand Central Band, New Zealand Band
- Grand Central Dispatch, computing technology from Apple Inc.
- Grand Central Records, independent record label based in Manchester, England
- Grand Central Station (radio series), 1937–1954
- Grand Central Publishing, a division of the Hachette Book Group
- "Grand Central", a song by No Devotion from Permanence
- Hotel Grand Central Ltd, a Singaporean-based company that owns the Hotel Grand Chancellor group
- GrandCentral, a voice over IP service that was acquired by Google and rebranded Google Voice

== See also ==
- Grand Central Station (disambiguation)
- Great Central (disambiguation)
