= Grand station =

Grand station may refer to:

- Grand station (CTA Blue Line), a Chicago 'L' station
- Grand station (CTA North Side Main Line), a former Chicago Transit Authority station
- Grand station (CTA Red Line), a Chicago 'L' station
- Grand station (MetroLink), in St. Louis, Missouri
- Grand Avenue Arts/Bunker Hill station, a Los Angeles Metro Rail station
- Grand Boulevard station, a QLine stop in Detroit, Michigan
- Grand/LATTC station, formerly Grand station, a Los Angeles Metro Rail station

== See also ==
- Grand (disambiguation)
- Grand Central Station (disambiguation)
- Gran Station, a railroad station in Gran, Norway
