= Lunner Station =

Railway station in Lunner, Norway

Lunner
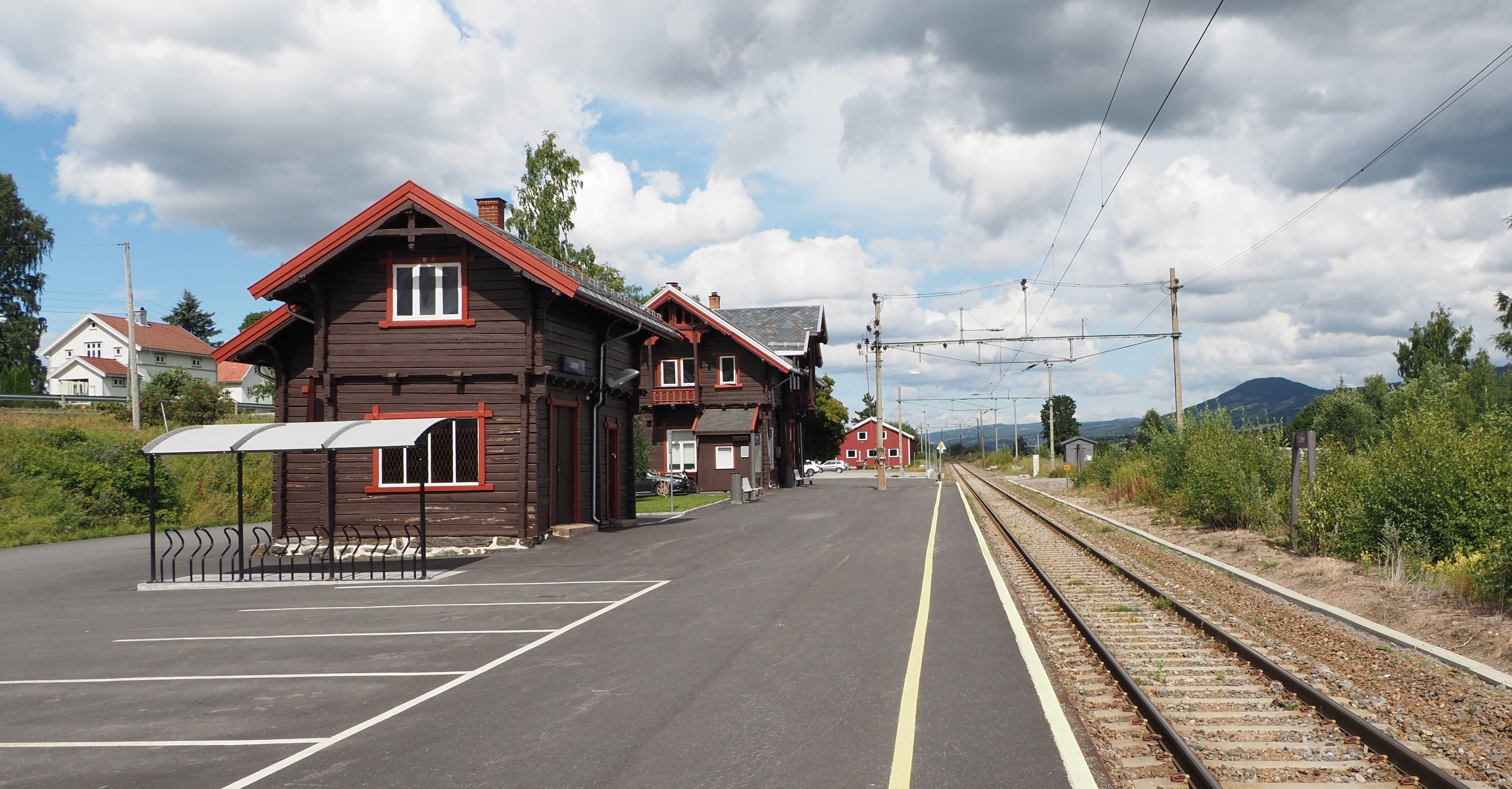

General information
- Location: Lunner, Norway
- Coordinates: 60.305272°N 10.584707°E
- Elevation: 280.9 m (922 ft)
- Owner: Bane NOR
- Operator: Vy Gjøvikbanen
- Line: Gjøvik Line
- Distance: 61.13 km
- Platforms: 2

History
- Opened: 20 December 1900
Location

Lunner Station (Norwegian: Lunner stasjon) is located on the Gjøvik Line at Lunner in Norway. The railway station was opened on 20 December 1900.

Preceding station			Following station
Roa	Gjøvik Line		Gran
Preceding station	Regional trains		Following station
Roa	RE30	Oslo S–Gjøvik	Gran
Preceding station	Local trains		Following station
Roa	R31	Oslo S–Jaren	Gran
