= Sift the Noise =

Sift The Noise

Studio album by Skipping Girl Vinegar
- Released: 18 September 2008 (Australia)
- Recorded: Various locations, Victoria, Australia, 2005–2008
- Genre: Indie rock, acoustic, folk
- Length: 31:59
- Label: Secret Fox (Australia), Popboomerang, MGM
- Producer: Greg Arnold, Caleb James, Mark Lang

Skipping Girl Vinegar chronology
| Sift The Noise (2008) | Keep Calm Carry The Monkey (2011) |

Singles from Sift the Noise
- 1. "One Chance" Released: 15 September 2007; 2. "Sift the Noise" Released: 30 August 2008

Sift the Noise is the debut album by Australian indie rock band Skipping Girl Vinegar. It was "recorded in living rooms, bedrooms, kitchens and studios across Melbourne – as well as ‘The Lookout’, a beach shack in Aireys Inlet". The album was mixed and mastered in London by Adrian Bushby, New York City by Greg Calbi and Nashville by Brad Jones.

The album was one of the first to be released on the short-lived DDA format in 2008.

Sift the Noise is dedicated to Norman and Lorna Lang, the grandparents of Mark and Sare Lang, who died during its creation.

== Critical reception ==
Sift the Noise received wholly positive reviews upon its late 2008 Australian release, and quickly established them as an important Australian independent band. Rip It Up magazine in Adelaide and Rave Magazine in Brisbane both made the second single and title track their respective "single of the week".

JMag and the Music Australia Guide both gave the album 4.5 stars . The title track was added to high rotation on Triple J and ABC Radio and Regional Content nationwide in February 2009. The accompanying animated clip for the single "Sift The Noise" also received critical acclaim with Rage featuring it as the band's second "indie clip of the week".

== Album packaging ==
The packaging of the album.

Many reviews of the album commented on the packaging. Early releases came packaged in a library-style, printed drawstring bag. All copies come in a triptych-fold sleeve with 'library card' naming those involved in the album's creation as 'borrowers' and distressed textured cover.

== Associated tours ==
Following the extensive national 'Sift The Noise' promotional tour, which garnered further positive reviews, Skipping Girl Vinegar embarked on another nationwide tour entitled 'Songs From Cold Places', previewing songs from their forthcoming album of the same name, due to be recorded early 2010.

== Personnel ==
- Chris Helm - Drums, backing vocals, melodica, banjo
- Mark Lang - Vocals, guitars, banjo
- Sare Lang - Bass guitar, backing vocals
- Amanthi Lynch - Piano, keyboards, backing vocals
- Greg Arnold, Caleb James & Mark Lang - Producers
- Caleb James, Mark Lang & David Cluney (at The Cottage; The Boat; Atlantis Studios, Melbourne; The Palace, Brisbane; except drums for tracks 2, 3, 8), Dave Car (at The Lookout; Aireys Inlet) - Recorders
- Scott Mullane (at Harmony, Brisbane) - Additional keyboards
- David Pitoto (at Mainstage, Croydon) - Additional editing and mix preparation
- Brad Jones (at Alx the Great, Nashville; except track 1), Adrian Bushby (at Rak Studios, London) - Mixers
- Jim DeMain (at Yes, Master!, Nashville, TN)
