= Roa Station =

Railway station in Lunner, Norway

Roa
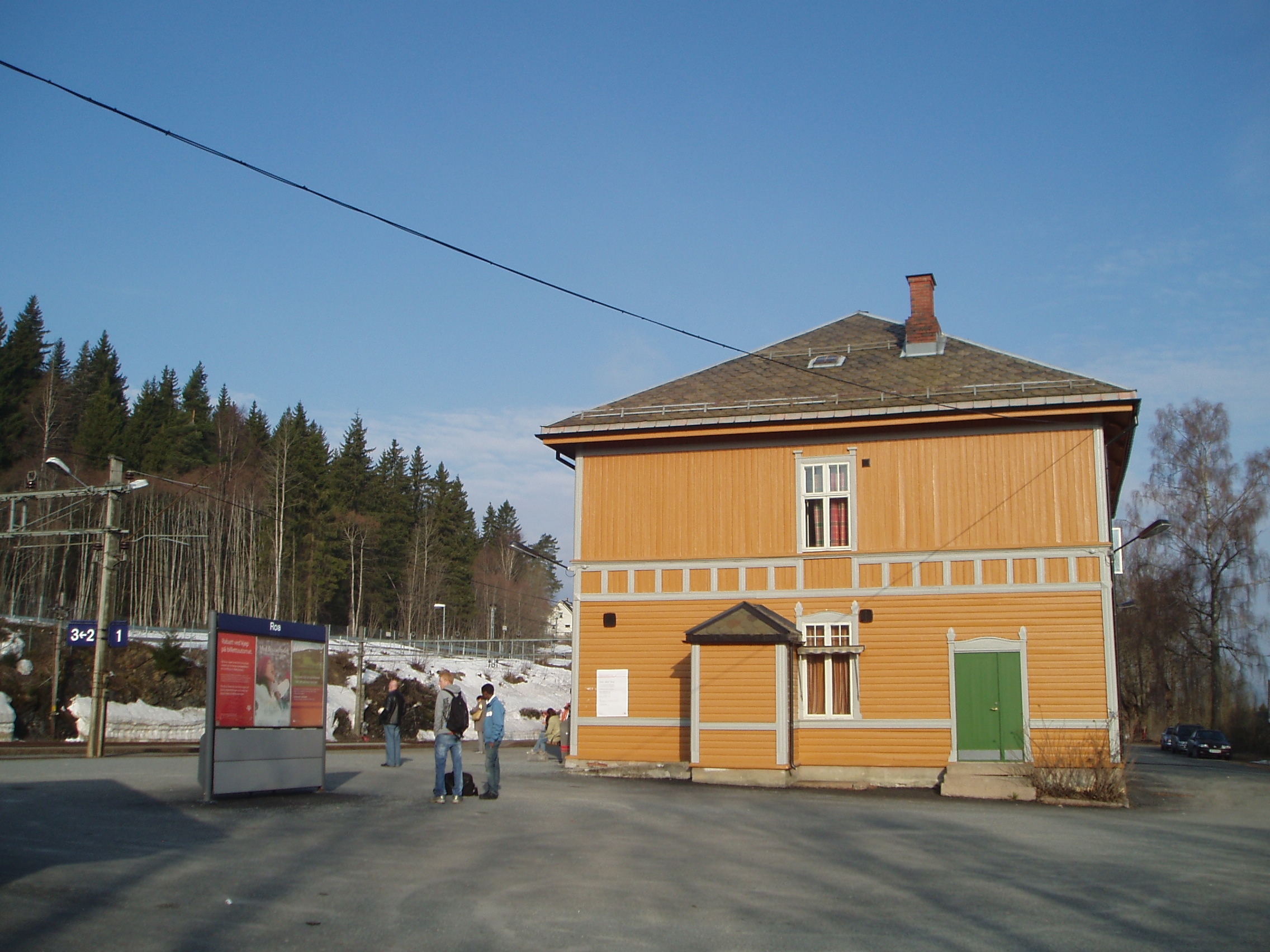

General information
- Location: Roa, Lunner; Norway
- Coordinates: 60.283549°N 10.6203°E
- Elevation: 313.2 m (1,028 ft)
- Owner: Bane NOR
- Operator: Vy Gjøvikbanen
- Lines: Gjøvik Line; Roa–Hønefoss Line
- Distance: 57.74 km
- Platforms: 2

Other information
- Station code: ROA

History
- Opened: 1 December 1909
Location

Roa Station (Norwegian: Roa stasjon) is a railway station in Roa, Norway on the Gjøvik Line. It is served by Oslo Commuter Rail line trains operated by Vy Gjøvikbanen. The station was opened in 1909 as part of the new Roa–Hønefoss Line that connects the Bergen Line to the Gjøvik Line.

The restaurant was taken over by Norsk Spisevognselskap on 1 January 1926. They originally had plans to expand the restaurant, but this was later terminated.

Preceding station			Following station
Grua	Gjøvik Line		Lunner
—	Roa–Hønefossbanen		Hønefoss
Preceding station	Regional trains		Following station
Grua	RE30	Oslo S–Gjøvik	Lunner
Preceding station	Local trains		Following station
Grua	R31	Oslo S–Jaren	Lunner
