= Scanet =

Norwegian train radio system

- Type: Train radio
- Location: Norway
- Protocols: Analog
- Use: Norwegian railway network
- Owner: Norwegian National Rail Administration
- Established: 1993
- Closed: 2007

Scanet is a defunct, analog train radio system used by the Norwegian State Railways (NSB) and later the Norwegian National Rail Administration. The system was developed by Ascom Radiocom and was installed on the primary railways in Norway between 1993 and 1996. The system allows radio communication between a train dispatcher, and train drivers and other users involved in railway operations. Scanet has three main components: the central traffic control, base stations which are located along the railway lines, and mobile station located in the trains. The system is further connected to the internal railway telephone network, where it functions like a regular telephone. Scanet is also connected to the automatic train control system.

However, several lines lack the system, including the Arendal Line, the Flåm Line, the Meråker Line, the Nordland Line, the Rauma Line, the Røros Line, the Eastern Østfold Line, the northern part of the Gjøvik Line, and several tunnels along the Bergen Line and the Sørlandet Line. The Åsta accident in 2000 spurred the need to give all parts of the railway coverage with train radio. On these lines, the dispatcher and drivers must communicate using the Nordic Mobile Telephone (NMT 450) standard, which by 2002 was being planned terminated by Telenor.

Scanet was replaced by Global System for Mobile Communications – Railway (GSM-R) in 2007. The system, delivered by Nokia Siemens Networks, was on time and on budget, and made Norway one of the first countries to fully implement the system throughout Europe. After GSM-R was fully implemented on 1 November, Scanet was gradually closed. The new system has been characterized as simpler to use and giving better audio quality than Scanet.

== See also ==
- Timeline of train radio in Norway
