= Nathan Haines =

New Zealand-British musician (born 1972)

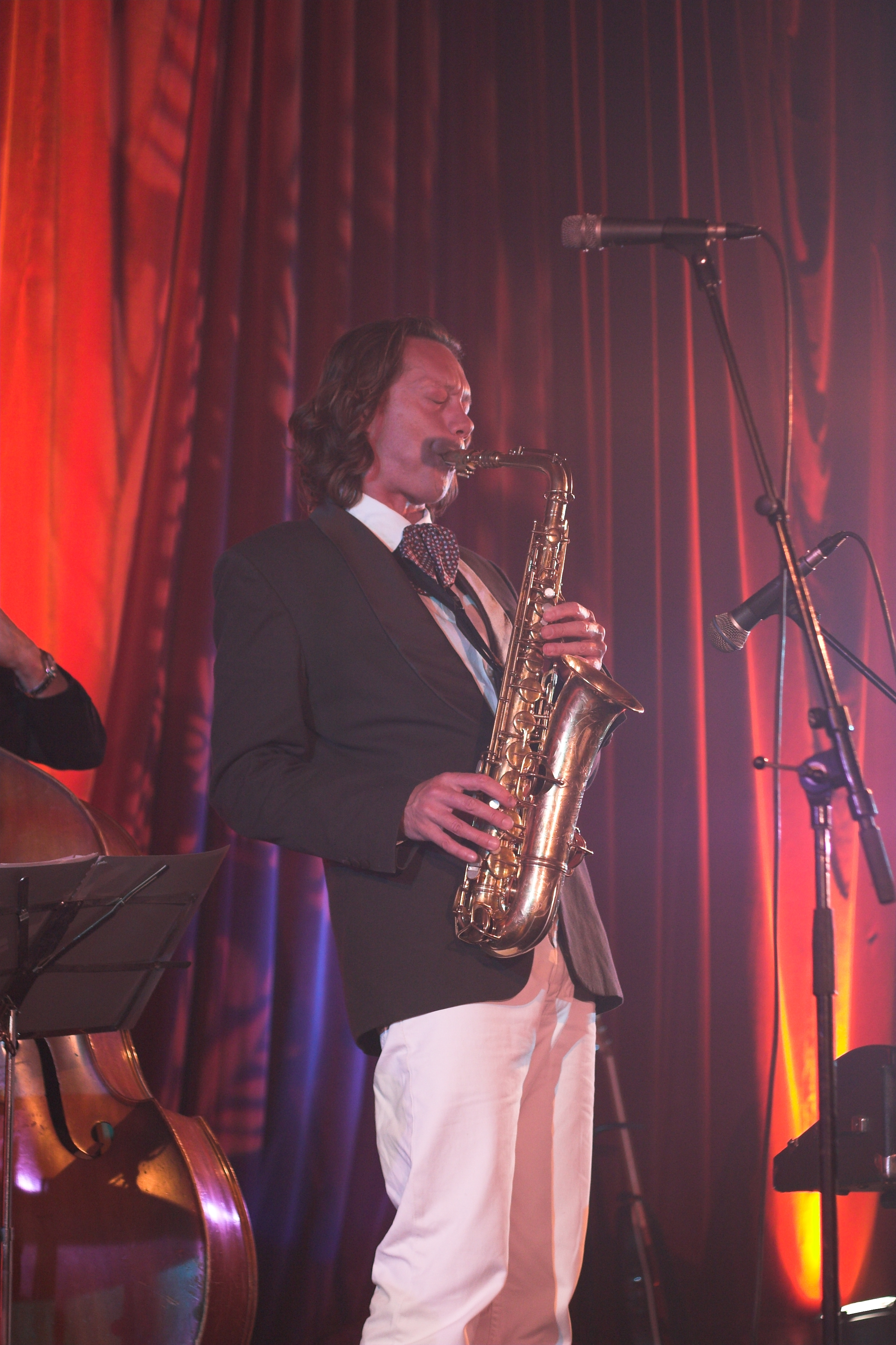

Background information
- Born: 1972 (age 53–54); Auckland, New Zealand
- Genres: Jazz
- Instruments: Flute, saxophone, keyboards, vocals
- Years active: 1992–present
- Website: nathanhaines.com

Nathan Haines (born 1972) is a New Zealand-born producer/vocalist/saxophonist based between London (since 1995) and his native Auckland.

== Life and career ==
Haines was born in 1972 in Takapuna on Auckland's North Shore. His father, Kevin was one of New Zealand's leading jazz bassists and with his guitarist brother Joel, they were playing International Jazz Festivals by the time they were in their early teens. Haines played gigs with Joel across New Zealand, before moving to New York City in 1991 to study jazz music. He returned in 1994 and recorded and released his first solo record Shift Left in April 1995, also released in the UK on the Verve Records label.

In 1995, he moved to London. His first release was a co-written 12-inch single on Metalheadz with drum and bass producer Jason Cambridge (DJ name A-Sides) in 1997. The pair had several follow-up singles. In 2000, his first UK based solo record Sound Travels, produced by Phil Asher was released on the now defunct UK label Chillifunk Records, and in 2003 the follow-up Squire for Hire was released featuring Marlena Shaw, Damon Albarn, Vanessa Freeman, Rich Medina, keyboardists Kaidi Thatham, Mike Patto, Mark de Clive Lowe, and many others, and was certified gold for album sales in New Zealand. Both albums featured Haines singing self-penned jazz ballads including the popular "Impossible Beauty" featured on Sound Travels.

New Zealand-based albums since 2005 have included Life Time, recorded with the 100-piece New Zealand Symphony Orchestra with arrangements by ex-pat US based Alan Broadbent, Right Now produced with Chris Cox and released in the UK on Freestyle Records and featuring vocalists Marlena Shaw and Ty, and Heaven and Earth. The straight to analog two-track album The Poet's Embrace recorded in 2013 and released on Warner Classics and Jazz in the UK and Germany was followed up with Vermillion Skies, both of which won the Tui New Zealand Jazz Album of the Year Award. Both albums were released on limited edition vinyl.

Haines spent most of 2014 recording 5 A Day in rural Buckinghamshire with writing and production partner Mike Patto. It was released in New Zealand in November 2014 on both CD, download and vinyl formats and features vocalists Vanessa Freeman, Kevin Mark Trail with Mike and Nathan on recording and production duties with drum programming from 4hero producer Marc Mac.

== Discography ==
Title	Album details	Peak NZ chart position
Shift Left	Released: 1995	32
Soundkilla Sessions Volume 1	Released: 1996	—
Sound Travels	Released: 2000; Format: CD	39
Squire for Hire	Released: 2003; Label: Formats: CD, LP	13
My London Friends (Marco Di Marco featuring Nathan Haines)	Released:1 October 2004	—
Life Time	Released: 2005	34
Right Now	Released: 3 December 2007; Formats: CD, download	—
Music for Cocktail Lovers	Released: 5 November 2008	—
Heaven and Earth	Released: 15 March 2010	13
Notes	Released: 9 August 2024	39

== See also ==
- Grand Central Band
