= Skipping Girl Vinegar =

Australian indie rock band

- Origin: Melbourne, Victoria, Australia
- Genres: Indie rock, acoustic, folk, indie pop
- Years active: 2004–present
- Labels: Popboomerang, MGM
- Members: Chris Helm; Mark Lang; Sare Lang; Amanthi Lynch; Kelly Lane
- Website: www.skippinggirlvinegar.com

Skipping Girl Vinegar are an Australian indie rock band from Melbourne formed in 2004, named after the Audrey the Skipping Girl Vinegar sign, located in Abbotsford, Victoria.

== History ==
=== 2004–2007: Formation and One Chance ===
Forming in 2004 the quartet wrote and rehearsed solidly before debuting live in 2006. Once playing they soon secured support slots opening for larger acts such as Bob Evans, Shout Out Louds, The Lemonheads and Something For Kate before releasing the single "One Chance" and its filmclip later in the year. The single received high rotation on Triple J radio, and drew the attention of several major record labels which the band negotiated with before choosing to take their own business Secret Fox to the smaller, independent label Popboomerang with distribution through MGM Records.

=== 2008–2009: Sift The Noise ===
Skipping Girl Vinegar recorded their debut album Sift the Noise over a 14-month period "in living rooms, bedrooms, kitchens and studios across Melbourne, as well as a beach shack in Aireys Inlet". Sift the Noise was produced and recorded by Greg Arnold, Brisbane-based producer Caleb James and Mark Lang. The album is notable for its intricate library-book-style packaging.

Upon release the album garnered positive reviews. Rip It Up magazine in Adelaide and Rave Magazine in Brisbane both made the "Sift The Noise" single their respective "Single of the Week".

JMAG and the Music Australia Guide (MAG) both gave the album 4.5 stars. The title track was added to high rotation on Triple J and ABC local radio nationwide in February 2009. The accompanying animated clip for 'Sift The Noise' also received critical acclaim with Rage featuring it as the band's second 'indie clip of the week'.

=== 2010–2013: Keep Calm Carry the Monkey ===
March 2010 saw the release of the band's first single, "One Long Week", which heralded a harder and more dynamic sound. New member, violinist and keyboard player Kelly Lane was brought into the band in early 2010.

Skipping Girl Vinegar opened the Splendour in the Grass festival, before releasing the singles "Wasted", "Chase the Sun", and "You Can", all taken from third album "Keep Calm Carry The Monkey".

Following a tour with Irish band Ash, the single "Making Our Way" was released to radio in mid 2013.

=== 2015: The Great Wave ===
Their 2013 single "Making Our Way" was taken from the band's most recent album The Great Wave, released in May 2015.

Preceding the release of the album was single Dance Again.

== Members ==
- Chris Helm – drums, vocals
- Mark Lang – guitars, banjo, vocals
- Sare Lang – bass, vocals
- Amanthi Lynch – keyboards, vocals
- Kelly Lane – violin, keyboards

== Discography ==
=== Singles ===
- 2008 - "One Chance"
- 2009 - "Sift The Noise"
- 2009 - "Sinking"
- 2010 - "One Long Week"
- 2010 - "Wasted"
- 2011 - "Here She Comes"
- 2011 - "You Can"
- 2011 - "Chase the Sun"
- 2013 - "Making our Way"
- 2015 - "Dance Again"

=== Albums ===
- 2008 - Sift the Noise
- 2011 - Keep Calm Carry The Monkey
- 2015 - The Great Wave

=== Compilation albums ===
- 2010 - Key of Sea
