= Bleiken Station =

Railway station in Gran, Norway

Bleiken
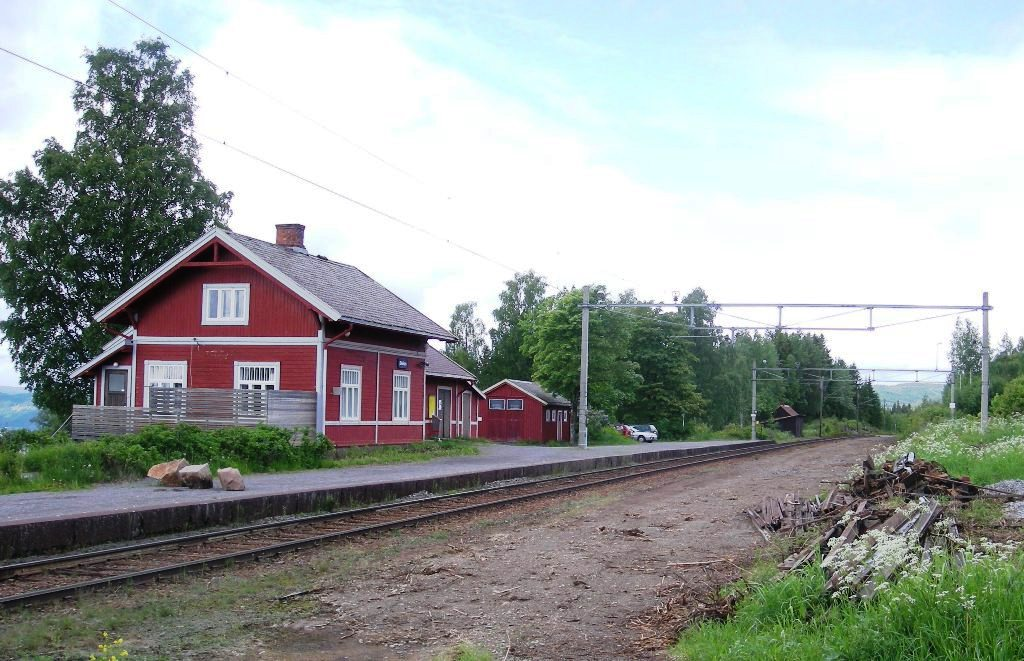
- Bleiken station (2010)

General information
- Location: Bleiken, Gran Municipality; Norway
- Coordinates: 60.46832°N 10.50031°E
- Elevation: 355.2 m (1,165 ft)
- Owner: Bane NOR
- Operator: Vy Gjøvikbanen
- Line: Gjøvik Line
- Distance: 81.23 km (50.47 mi)
- Platforms: 2

History
- Opened: 23 December 1901
Location

Bleiken Station (Norwegian: Bleiken stasjon) is located on the Gjøvik Line at Bleiken in Gran Municipality, Norway. The railway station was opened on 23 December 1901.

Preceding station			Following station
Jaren	Gjøvik Line		Eina; Hennung
Preceding station	Regional trains		Following station
Jaren	RE30	Oslo S–Gjøvik	Eina
