= Central Terminal =

Central Terminal may refer to:

- Central Terminal LRT station, a light rail transit station in Manila, Philippines
- Buffalo Central Terminal, a historic former railroad station in Buffalo, New York, United States
- Grand Central Terminal, in New York City, New York, United States

== See also ==
- Central Station (disambiguation)
