= Keep Calm Carry the Monkey =

Studio album by Skipping Girl Vinegar
- Released: 7 May 2011 (Australia)
- Recorded: Various locations, Victoria, Australia; Nashville Tennessee 2010–2011
- Genres: Indie rock, acoustic, folk
- Length: 33:17
- Labels: Secret Fox (Australia), Popboomerang, MGM
- Producers: Greg Arnold, Caleb James, Nick Huggins, Mark Lang

Skipping Girl Vinegar chronology
Sift the Noise (2009)	Keep Calm Carry the Monkey (2011)	'The Great Wave' (2015)

Singles from Keep Calm Carry the Monkey
- 1. "One Long Week" Released: 11 March 2011; 2. "Wasted" Released: 1 May 2011; 3. "You Can" Released: 14 July 2011; 4. "Chase the Sun" Released: 22 October 2011

Keep Calm and Carry the Monkey is the second album by Australian rock band Skipping Girl Vinegar.

The first single from the album, "One Long Week", was released in March 2011. This heralded a harder and more dynamic sound. The song was playlisted by Triple J and other Australian radio stations. The album was released two months later.

Skipping Girl Vinegar opened the 2011 Splendour in the Grass festival. Days after the festival the band released another single, "Wasted". This also achieved widespread radio airplay and heralded the beginning of their Drown It Out tour, as did following singles "Chase the Sun", and "You Can", taken from their third album "Keep Calm Carry the Monkey".

In March 2012, the band performed on the Australian television programme Adam Hills' In Gordon Street Tonight with their single "Chase the Sun".

== Chase the Sun filmclip ==
The music video for single Chase the Sun involved a toy monkey the band found in hard rubbish and creating a small spacecraft made from foam, gaffa tape and a weather balloon. The monkey (Baker) was sent into the atmosphere with an onboard camera, reaching 110,000 feet and the resulting footage was incorporated into the filmclip.

== Reception ==
Reviews for the album were uniformly positive, with many noting the guest appearance of Canadian singer-songwriter Ron Sexsmith on the closing track 'Heart Does Ache'.

The national 'Drown it Out' tour followed, promoting the album.

== Track listing ==
All songs written by Skipping Girl Vinegar

1. Chase the Sun
2. You Can
3. Hand To Hold
4. Central Station
5. Hell Out Of Town
6. Moose Took Me Deep
7. Castles Full Of Storms
8. One Long Week
9. Wasted
10. Slow Steady Hand
11. Here She Comes
12. Heart Does Ache
