= Central Station (nightclub) =

Nightclub in Moscow, Russia

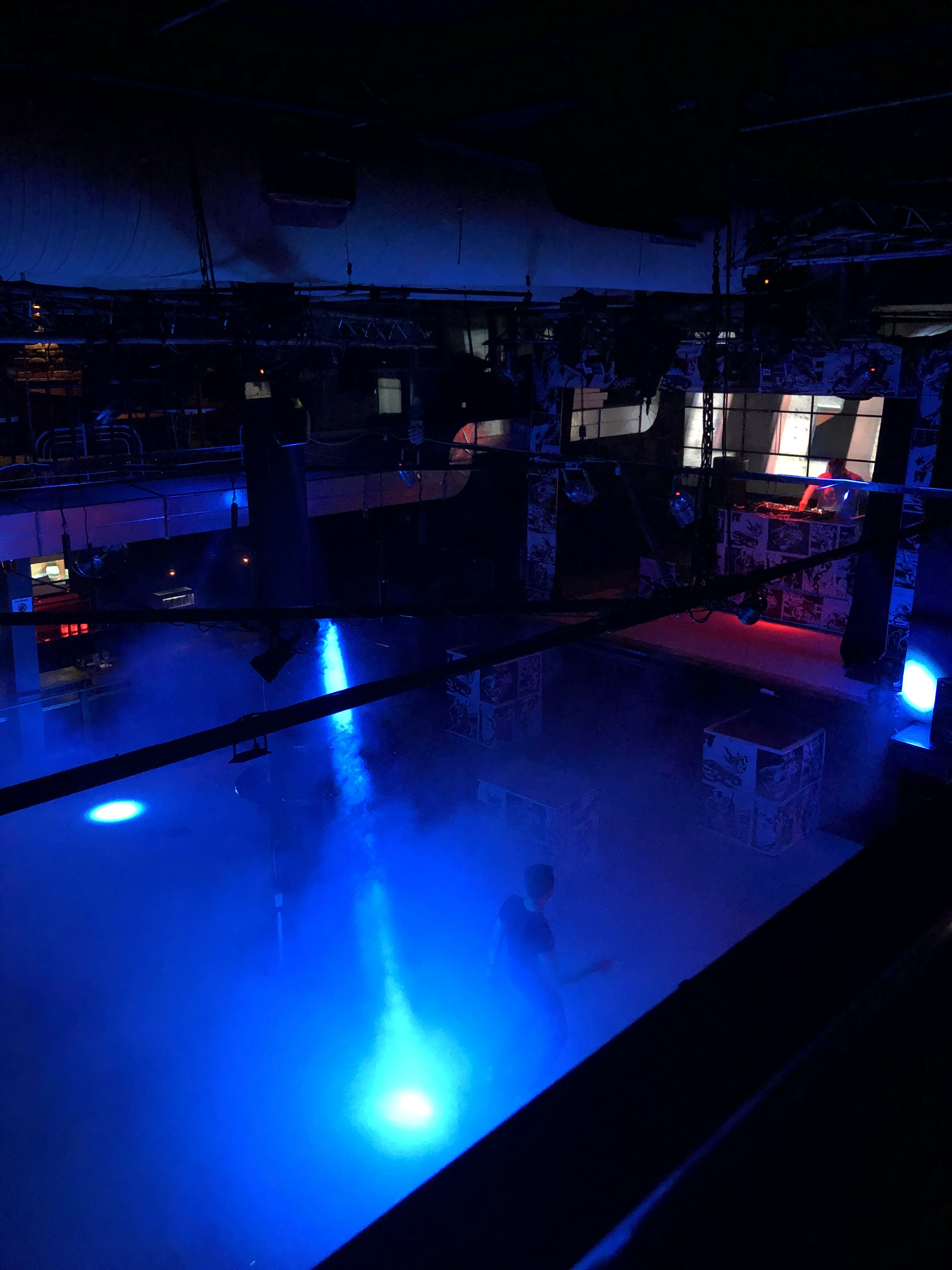
- The main dance floor of the Moscow venue
- Interactive map of Central Station
- Address: Leninskaya Sloboda 19 building 2
- Location: Moscow
- Coordinates: 55.7071499°N 37.6490591°E
- Type: Nightclub

Website
- www.mcentralstation.com/new

Central Station (Russian: Центральная Станция, romanized: Tsentralnaya Stantsya) is a nightclub (formerly a gay club) in Moscow, Russia. It had a venue in Saint Petersburg, but it was closed after the Supreme Court of Russia designated the "international LGBT movement" as "extremist".

== Moscow ==
Central Station was the largest gay bar and night club in Moscow, Russia. Before 2014 the club was located in the several places in the center of Moscow, but closed in March 2014 in part due to a series of violent attacks, which included a shooting, gas and water attacks. It was later re-opened at a new location.

Central Station is open daily from 10pm until the morning. The entrance is free for both men and women on most days, but a cover charge may exist at weekends and some other days. It has two halls dance floors and three bars; the larger hall has a gallery and a lounge area with a dark labyrinth. The club also has a fenced summer terrace outside with a separate bar. Central Station was known for its colorful drag shows and the afterparty, which were held on Saturdays and Sundays. There is face control.

Central Station in Moscow was raided by authorities in an anti-LGBTQ+ crackdown in 2024, and over 50 people were detained.

== Saint-Petersburg ==
Central Station was the biggest gay bar and nightclub in Saint-Petersburg. It was branch of the Moscow club. The bar was open daily from 10pm until the morning. The entrance was restricted for women on most days and there was tight face control. Central Station had several bars situated on three floors, a restaurant with karaoke, a dance floor, a lounge area and a dark labyrinth. There was an after-party on Saturdays and Sundays.

There was also companion sauna called Voda located in the same building. Central Station held a regular cruising party called Hunters Party. Following the Supreme Court of Russia designating the "international LGBT movement" as an "extremist" organization in 2023, Central Station in Saint Petersburg was closed.
