= Gran Station =

Railway station in Gran, Norway

Gran
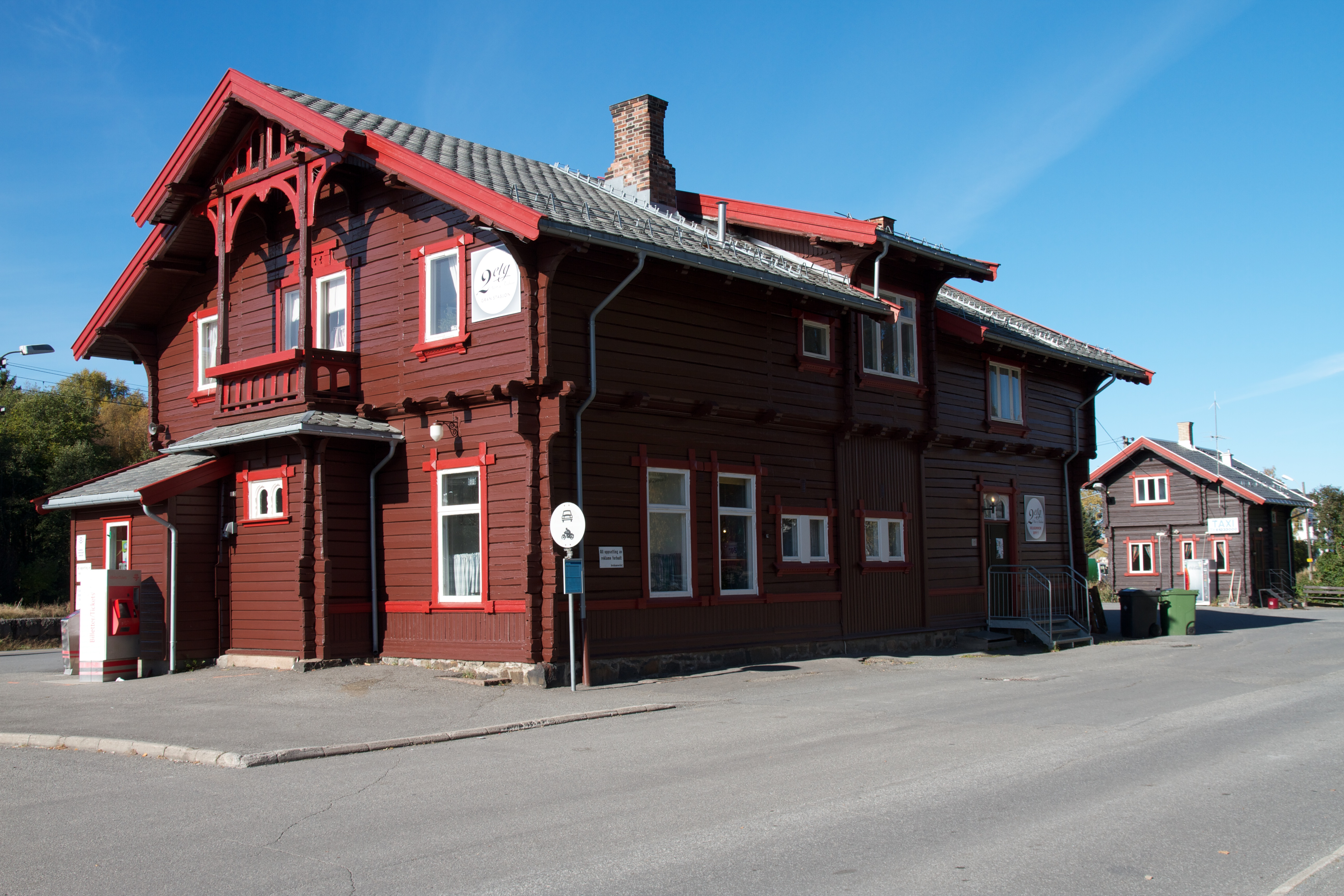
- File:Gran stasjon - 2012-09-30 at 12-52-07.jpg

General information
- Location: Gran, Gran Municipality; Norway
- Coordinates: 60.359065°N 10.569606°E
- Elevation: 205.2 m (673 ft)
- Owner: Bane NOR
- Operator: Vy Gjøvikbanen
- Line: Gjøvik Line
- Distance: 67.66 km
- Platforms: 2

Construction
- Architect: Paul Due

History
- Opened: 20 December 1900
Location

Gran Station (Norwegian: Gran stasjon) is located on the Gjøvik Line in the village of Gran in Gran Municipality in Norway. The station was opened on 20 December 1900. It is served by the Oslo Commuter Rail, operated by Vy Gjøvikbanen, twice each two hours.

Preceding station			Following station
Lunner	Gjøvik Line		Jaren; Nordtangen
Preceding station	Regional trains		Following station
Lunner	RE30	Oslo S–Gjøvik	Jaren
Preceding station	Local trains		Following station
Lunner	R31	Oslo S–Jaren	Jaren
