= Grand Central Band =

New Zealand band

The Grand Central Band was a New Zealand-based band formed in 1997 by Chris Melville. The band moved through several different line-ups, and over the years employed and guested around 70 different musicians, and esteemed local celebrities including Nathan Haines, Midge Marsden, Maria Paterson (bassist for Dave Dobbyn/Neil Finn), and Kim Willoughby (from When The Cat's Away).

The band's regular performance at the Grand Central Bar in Ponsonby, Auckland, extended to 17 years, earning them a reputation as a 'go-to gig' for other musicians and music students.

The Grand Central Band released their first album Cook Street Sessions (Rhythmworks) in 2000, produced by Eddie Rayner, formerly from the iconic kiwi band Split Enz and had favourable writeups. The album sold out. The band then self-produced their second album Brightest Star (Rhythmworks) and again had some great local reviews. They sold out of this album too.

They were seen in Vanuatu at the inaugural jazz festival in Port Vila.

They disbanded in August 2014.

Their two albums Cook Street Sessions and Brightest Star were made available on streaming services on 27 July 2018.

== Members ==
- Chris Melville – vocals
- Alan Brown – Rhodes piano, clavinet and melodica
- Karika "Junior" Turua – bass
- Josh Sorenson – drums
- Dixon Nacey – guitar

The band also allowed a variety of local students and working musicians onstage as part of the 'extended' band.
