= Evelyn Bark =

Humanitarian aid worker

Evelyn Elizabeth Patricia Bark, CMG OBE (1900 - 1993) was a leading member of the British Red Cross.

== Biography ==
Bark was born on 26 December 1900.

Bark joined a Voluntary Aid Detachment at the outbreak of WWII. In 1944 she moved to the Foreign Relations Department and then to the British Red Cross Commission in Europe which entered the newly liberated areas in Belgium, the Netherlands and Germany. She was one of the first to enter the Bergen-Belsen concentration camp, By first helping cut the mortality rate, and then establishing a tracing service for the survivors which evolved into the International Committee of the Red Cross's International Tracing Service. She stayed in Germany until 1949, including organising the Bad Pyrmont Hospital and Rehabilitation Centre.

Evelyn Bark returned to London, eventually becoming Director of International Affairs, and helped establish Red Cross and Red Cresecent societies across the world, responding to successive crises. In 1956 she co-ordinated relief for Hungarian refugees in Austria for the League of Red Cross Societies.

She was awarded an OBE in 1952. On 23 January 1964 she was the subject of an episode of This Is Your Life. After the Order of St Michael and St George was opened to women in 1965, she became the first female CMG in the 1967 New Year Honours.

Bark died on 7 June 1993.
