= Grand Central Station (disambiguation) =

Grand Central Station, officially Grand Central Terminal, is a major station in New York City.

Grand Central Station may also refer to:

== New York City ==
- Grand Central–42nd Street (New York City Subway), a New York City Subway station complex at Grand Central Terminal
- Grand Central Madison station, a Long Island Rail Road station complex under Grand Central Terminal
- Grand Central Station (1900–1910), a station that was located on the site of Grand Central Terminal from 1900 to 1910
- Grand Central station (IRT 42nd Street Branch), a former New York City elevated station (1878–1923)

== Other places ==
- Birmingham New Street railway station, England, also known as Grand Central station
- Grand Central Station (Chicago), a former train station (1890–1969)
- Belfast Grand Central station, railway station in Belfast, Northern Ireland

== Other uses ==
- Grand Central Station (radio series), a radio series running from 1937–1954

== See also ==
- Grand Central (disambiguation)
- Grand station (disambiguation)
- Graham Central Station
