= Harold Tamblyn-Watts =

British wildlife and comic strip artist

Harold William Tamblyn Watts (5 May 1900 – 1999) was a British wildlife and comic strip artist who contributed to TV Comic, Jack and Jill, TV Playland and various annuals, including Eagle and Girl Annuals.

Harold Tamblyn-Watts was the son of Thomas Tamblyn-Watts, an author and publisher. Educated at Southend School of Art, he worked as a manager for the Emmett Group in 1935–48.

As a comics artist, he is best remembered for his brief time illustrating Supercar in TV Comic in 1961, although he also illustrated such features as 'On the Danger Trail with Grahame Dangerfield' in TV Comic Annual and 'Out and About with Uncle Ben' in Jack and Jill. His longest-running strip work was for 'Katie Country Mouse' in Jack and Jill which he took over from Philip Mendoza in 1964.

Tamblyn-Watts also illustrated a number of books and exhibited watercolours.
