= Great Central =

Great Central or Great Central Railway may refer to:

== Railways ==
- Great Central Railway, a historical railway company in the United Kingdom
- Great Central Railway (heritage railway), a modern heritage railway in Leicestershire, England
- Great Central Railway (Nottingham), a modern heritage railway in Nottinghamshire, England
- Great Central Main Line, the historical route these companies follow(ed)
- Great Lakes Central Railroad, a short line in Michigan, United States
- Great Western and Great Central Joint Railway, a main line in south east England
- Hull and Barnsley and Great Central Joint Railway, also known as the Gowdall and Braithwell Railway
- Great Central tube station, the former name of Marylebone London Underground station, in England

== Other ==
- Great Central Lake, lake in British Columbia, Canada
- Great Central League, baseball league in the Upper Midwest United States
- Great Central Mines, a defunct mining company in Australian
- Great Central Road, in Australia

== See also ==
- Grand Central (disambiguation)
