= Roa–Hønefoss Line =

Railway line in Norway

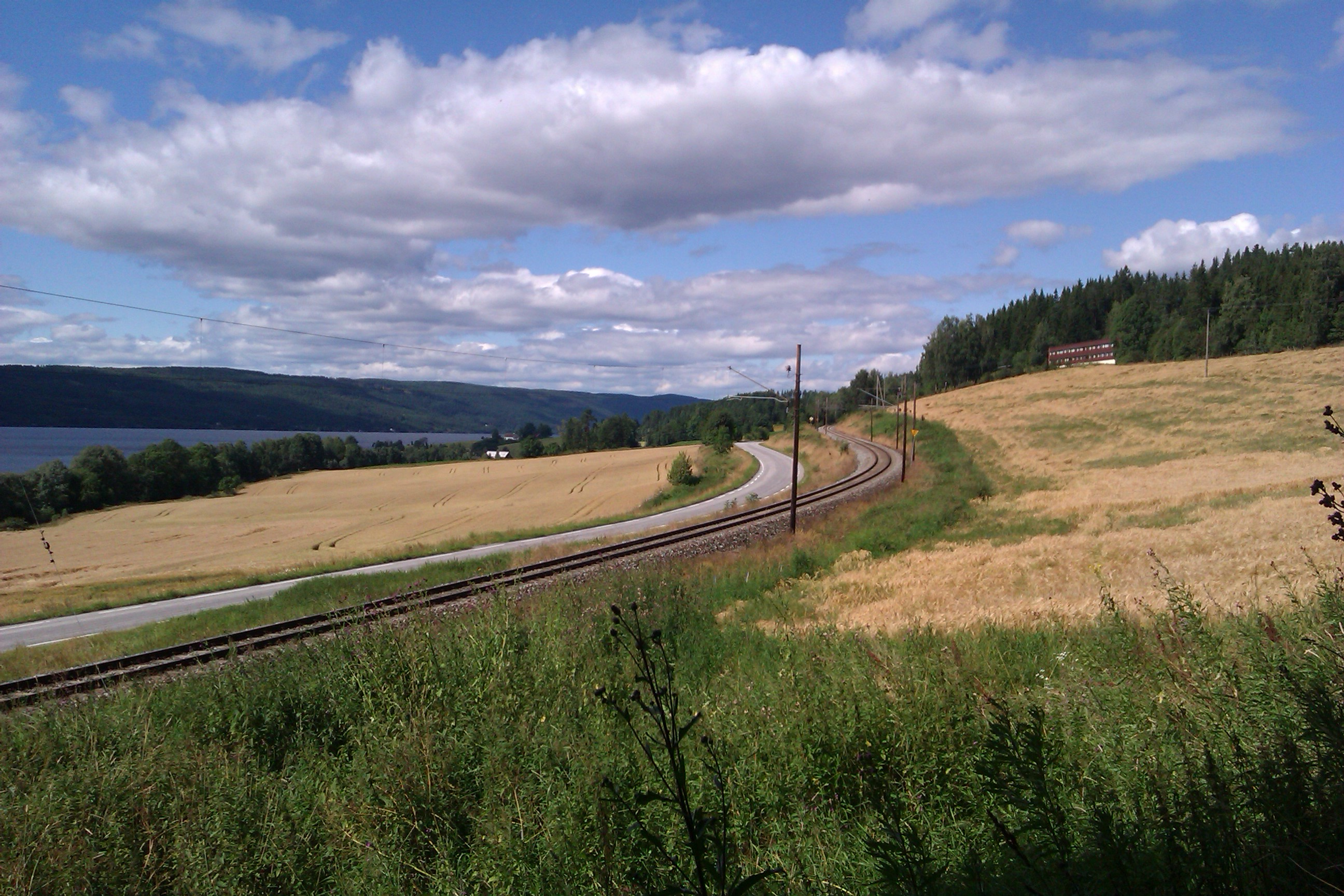
- The line through Jevnaker along Randsfjorden

Overview
- Native name: Roa–Hønefossbanen
- Owner: Norwegian National Rail Administration
- Termini: Roa Station; Hønefoss Station
- Stations: 7

Service
- Type: Railway
- System: Norwegian railway
- Operator(s): CargoNet

History
- Opened: 1 December 1909

Technical
- Line length: 31.83 km (19.78 mi)
- Number of tracks: Single
- Character: Freight
- Track gauge: 1,435 mm (4 ft 8 1/2 in)
- Electrification: 15 kV 16.7 Hz AC
- Highest elevation: 313.2 m (1,028 ft) amsl

The Roa–Hønefoss Line (Norwegian: Roa–Hønefossbanen, formerly Roa–Hønefosslinjen) is a 32-kilometer (20 mi) long, single track railway line between Roa and Hønefoss in Norway. At Roa Station, the line connects to the Gjøvik Line, while at Hønefoss Station, it connects to the Randsfjorden Line and the Bergen Line. The line runs through Akershus and Buskerud counties and allowed the Bergen Line access to Oslo at Oslo East Station.

The Line was built by the Norwegian State Railways (NSB) and opened on 1 December 1909, along with the last part of the Bergen Line. The line was electrified in 1961. Until 1989, nearly all Oslo–Bergen trains used the line to terminate at Oslo East Station. It was also possible to reach Oslo from Hønefoss via the Randsfjord Line, albeit terminating at Oslo West Station. NSB also ran a local service between Hønefoss and Oslo along the Roa–Hønefoss Line. Oslo–Bergen trains ran via the Randsfjord Line after 1989 and local train services have been terminated. However, the line remains in use for freight trains along the Oslo–Bergen route.

== Route ==
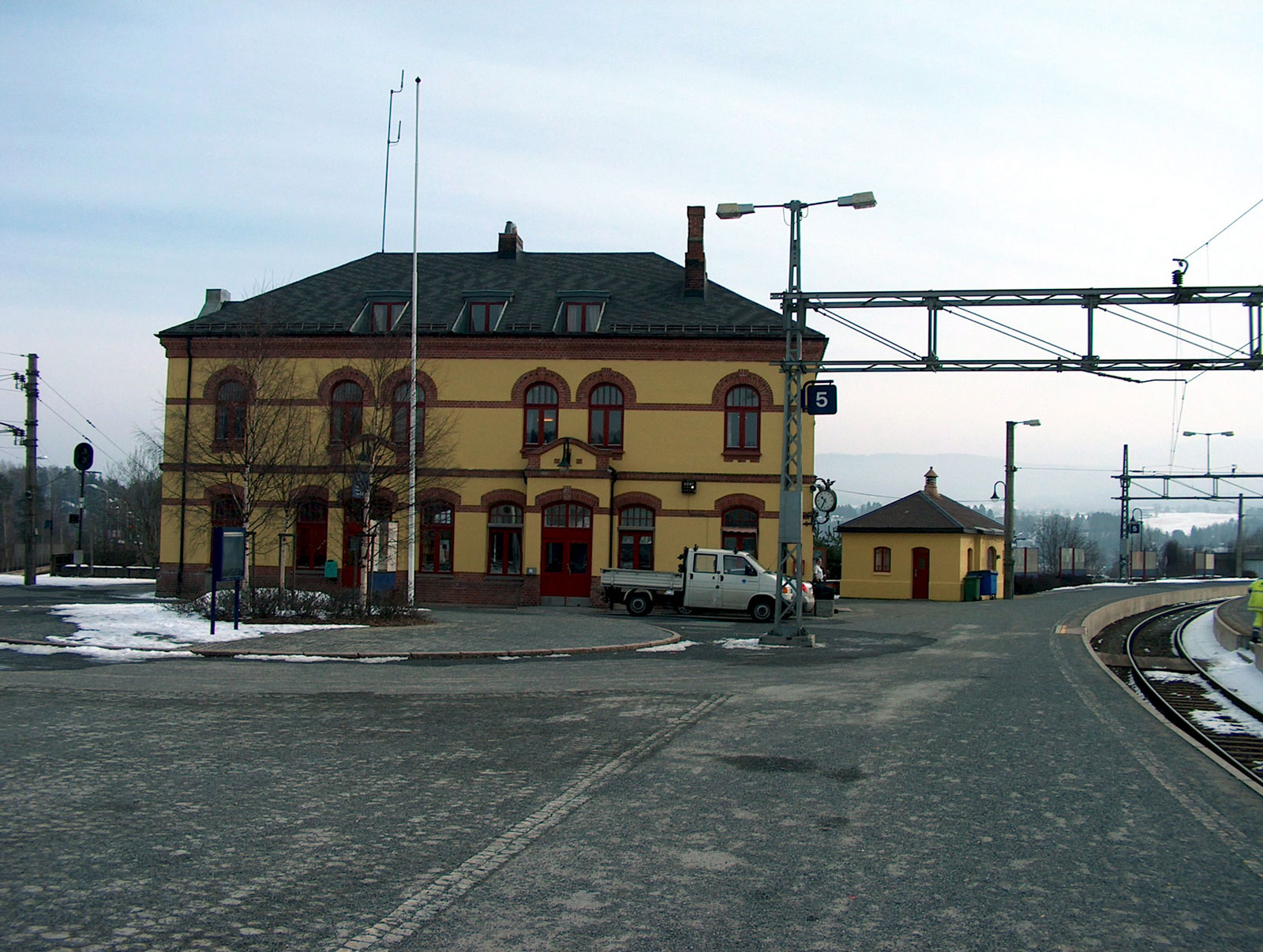
Hønefoss Station, the western terminus of the Roa-Hønefoss Line

The line starts at Roa Station, which is also located on the Gjøvik Line and is 57.54 kilometers (35.75 mi) from Oslo Central Station (Oslo S). Located at 313.2 meters (1,028 ft) above mean sea level, Roa has the highest elevation on the whole line. The line runs first west, then south to Jevnaker Station, passing Kalvsjø Station, Grindvoll Station, Gunstad Station, Bjellum Tunnel and Kvellsrud Station, before reaching Jevnaker, which is 19 kilometers (12 mi) from Roa. For a long time, Jevnaker had two separate stations located at each end of the town, with the other station serving as the terminus of the Randsfjord Line.

The line then runs south-west, past Bergerfoss and Kistefoss, before reaching Viul. There, there is a branch to a lumber mill. After Viul, the line runs through two tunnels, 95 and 185 meters (312 and 607 ft) long. At Hval, located 27 kilometers (17 mi) from Roa, there was formerly a spur to a military camp. The line then runs over a 55-meter-long (180 ft) bridge over Randselva before passing Hønen and a spur at Hønen and to a Goman bakery. Just before reaching Hønefoss Station, the line runs on a 216-meter-long (709 ft) bridge over Begna. At Hønefoss, the Roa–Hønefoss Line and the Randsfjord Line come in from the east while the Randsfjord Line and the Bergen Line continue to the west. Hønefoss is 89.57 kilometers (55.66 mi) from Oslo via Roa and 124.21 kilometers (77.18 mi) via Drammen.

== History ==
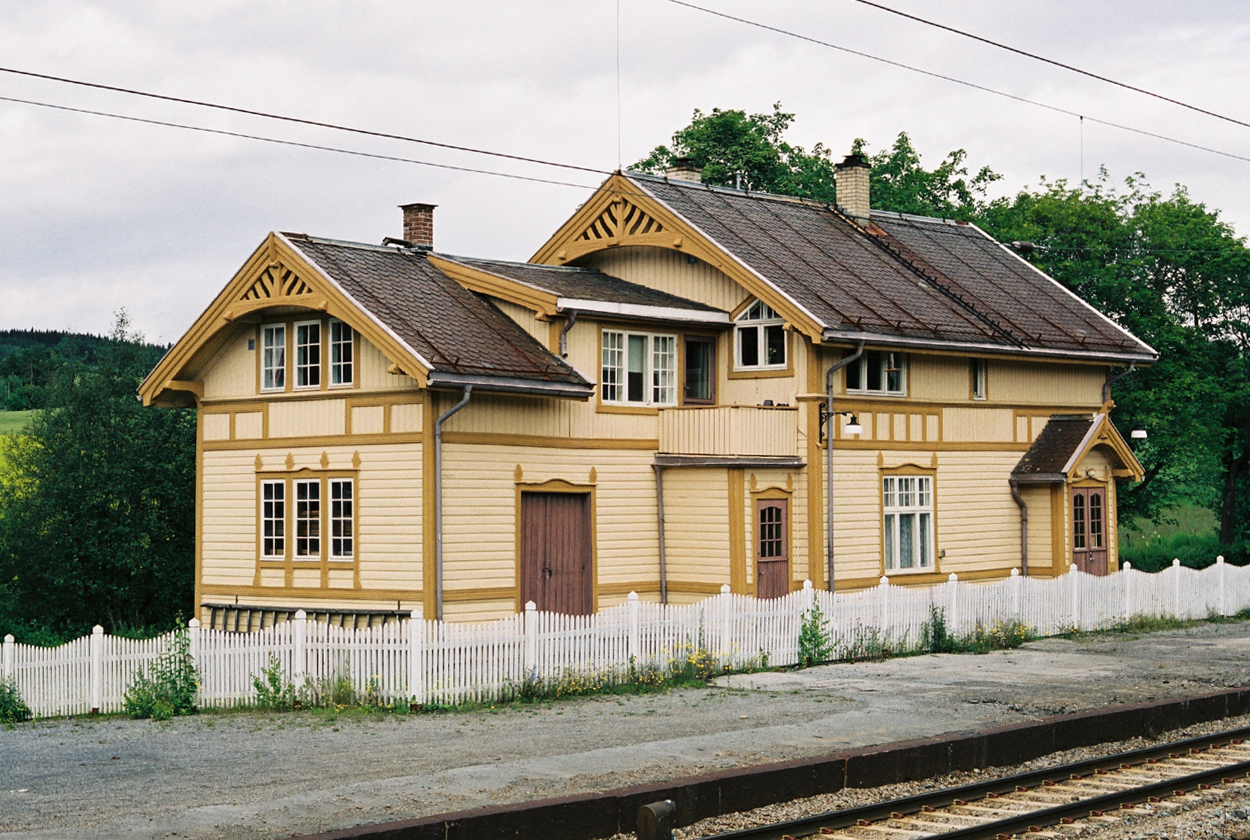
Grindvoll Station

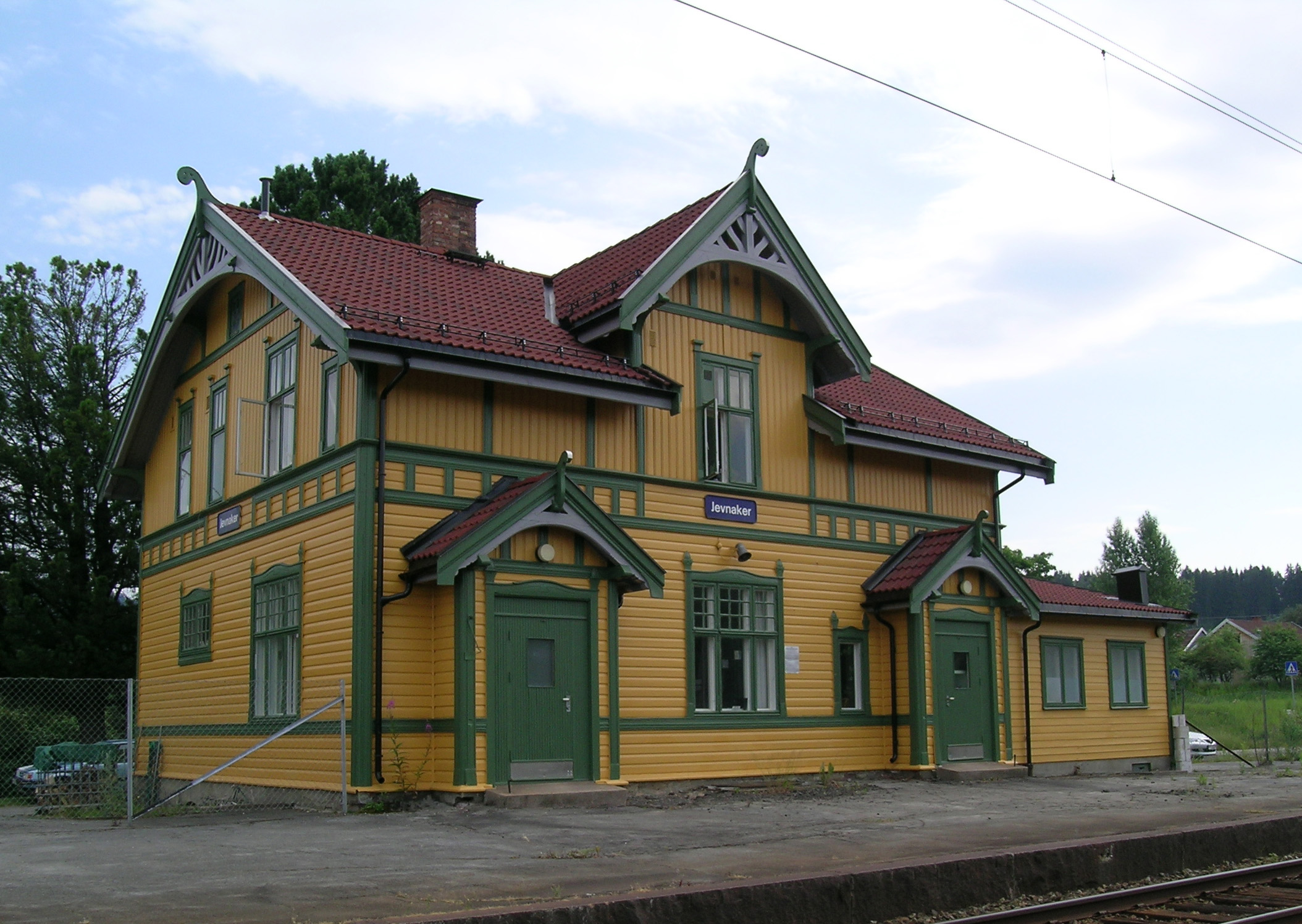
Jevnaker Station

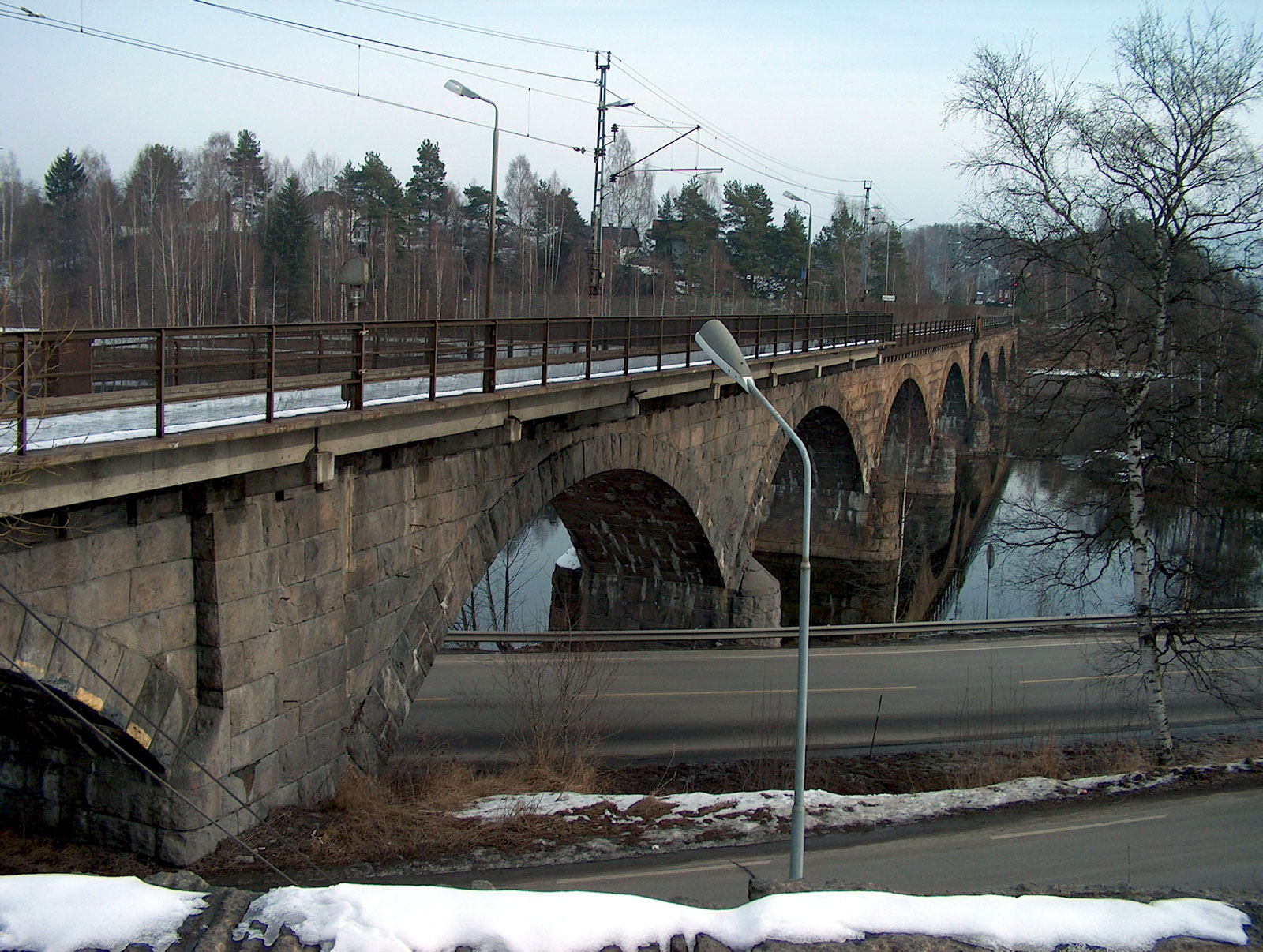
The bridge over Begna, next to Hønefoss Station

Hønefoss Station opened on 13 October 1868 as an intermediate station on the Randsfjord Line which connects Randsfjorden to Drammen. The initial proposals for the Bergen Line route went from Hønefoss via Sandvika to Oslo West Station (Oslo V). However, this was met with a combination of political opposition and technical restrictions. During the 1880s and 1890s, all lines that did not connect to Sweden were to be built with 1,067 mm (3 ft 6 in) narrow gauge. The Drammen Line, which connected Sandvika to Oslo, was narrow gauge, as were the rest of the lines west of Oslo. During the planning of the Gjøvik Line (at the time known as the North Line), military considerations eventually led to the decision to build it with standard gauge. Eventually it was decided that the Bergen Line would also be built with standard gauge. However, to reach Oslo from Hønefoss, a longer route to connect to the Gjøvik Line would have to be built, allowing the line to connect to the more important Oslo East Station. The construction of the Roa–Hønefoss Line and the Bergen Line from Hønefoss to Taugevatn was passed by the Parliament of Norway on 2 June 1898.

The line was built by NSB as part of the Bergen Line project, for which construction across the mountain had commenced in 1895. Construction of the Roa–Hønefoss Line started in 1903. This section is relatively flat and was the easiest part of the project to build. The line was officially opened along with the section of the Bergen Line from Gulsvik to Hønefoss, by King Haakon VII on 27 November 1909. It was taken into ordinary use on 1 December. At the time the line opened, there were stations at Roa, Grindvoll, Jevnaker, Hval and Hønefoss.

To begin with, the line had a single through train from Oslo to Bergen, with an additional summer express—with a limited number of stops. In addition, there were two additional trains from Hønefoss to Oslo. From 1 May 1912, a night train was also introduced and the same year mixed passenger and freight trains were introduced from Ål on the Bergen Line to Oslo. A station was opened at Viul on 16 August 1915, and another at Kistefoss on 1 October. Because of economic impact of World War I, the night train services was reduced to only twice a week from 20 May 1917 until 7 June 1919. In 1930, new stations were established at Kalvsjø, Gunstad, Bergerfoss and Hønen. During World War II from 1940 to 1945, the frequency was reduced to no more than one train per day. During parts of 1940, the Oslo–Bergen line was instead run via the Drammen and Randsfjord Lines. However, two local trains were kept on the route from Hønefoss to Roa.

From 18 November 1945, the daily Oslo–Bergen trains again ran via Roa, while the local trains from Oslo to Hønefoss increased to three daily round trips. Three weekly night trains were introduced from 1946. From 2 January to 1 May 1947, there was four weekly express services from Oslo to Geilo on the Bergen Line. By 1950, the situation had normalized and there were daily day and night trains and three weekly express trains—the latter with no stops between Hønefoss and Oslo. Kvellsrud Station opened on 18 August 1952.

In the 1930s, it was decided that the Bergen Line was to be electrified. After the first section, from Bergen to Voss, was completed in 1954, the Gjøvik Line and the Roa–Hønefoss Line were the next to be electrified. The sections Oslo–Jaren and Roa–Hønefoss opened with 15 kV 16.7 Hz AC electric traction on 1 February 1961. Automatic signaling was put into service on 10 December 1973 and automatic train stop was put into operation on 27 October 1987.

From 3 June 1984, the day train was moved to run via Drammen. Until 1989, the Roa–Hønefoss Line had four daily round trips with a local train from Hønefoss via Roa to Oslo, normally a Class 65 or Class 67 unit. From 1989, this was reduced to a single round trip, with a morning train from Hønefoss to Oslo and a return in the afternoon. Eventually this was taken over by a Class 69 unit and by the late 1990s taken out of service. The Roa–Hønefoss Line remains a pure freight track for long-haul freight trains on the Bergen Line. After the opening of the Oslo Tunnel and Oslo Central Station in 1989, passenger trains run via Drammen; however, the Roa–Hønefoss Line is used as a reserve line for passenger trains when the Drammen Line or Randsfjord Line is out of service.
