= Hval Sjokoladefabrikk =

Norwegian confectionery company

- Type: Aksjeselskap (ASA)
- Industry: Chocolate factory
- Founded: 26 February 1996
- Founder: Rolf Rune Forsberg
- Headquarters: Sandefjord, Norway
- Area served: Norway, Sweden, Denmark
- Products: Chocolate, marzipan, confectionery, sweets
- Revenue: NOK 31 million (2015)
- Number of employees: 11 (2015)
- Website: hvalsjokolade.no

Hval sjokoladefabrikk is a chocolate factory in Sandefjord, Norway. It manufactures and markets confectionery made of chocolate and marzipan. It was established by Rolf Rune Forsberg at Pindsle in 1995 as Vestfold County’s only chocolate factory. The factory distributes its products throughout Norway along with some export abroad.

== History ==
In 1999, Hval Sjokoladefabrikk established its first distribution deal with a major grocery store chain in Norway, ICA Gruppen. Roughly 100 ICA grocery stores began selling their products. The products were also sold in Color Line ferries. Prior to 1999, their products were only found in Narvesen convenience stores and Esso gas stations. Other special distribution deals have included a local distribution agreement with Meny in Sandefjord. As of 2015, products were sold at a variety of stores, including Nille and Europris.

In 2000, investor Christen Sveaas purchased stocks making him the second-largest owner of Hval Sjokoladefabrikk ASA. Its founder, Rolf Rune Forsberg, remained the largest shareholder with 15 percent. Sveaas purchased 11.1 percent for NOK 2.7 million.
