= Grand Central, Manchester =

Pub and music venue in Manchester, England

Grand Central
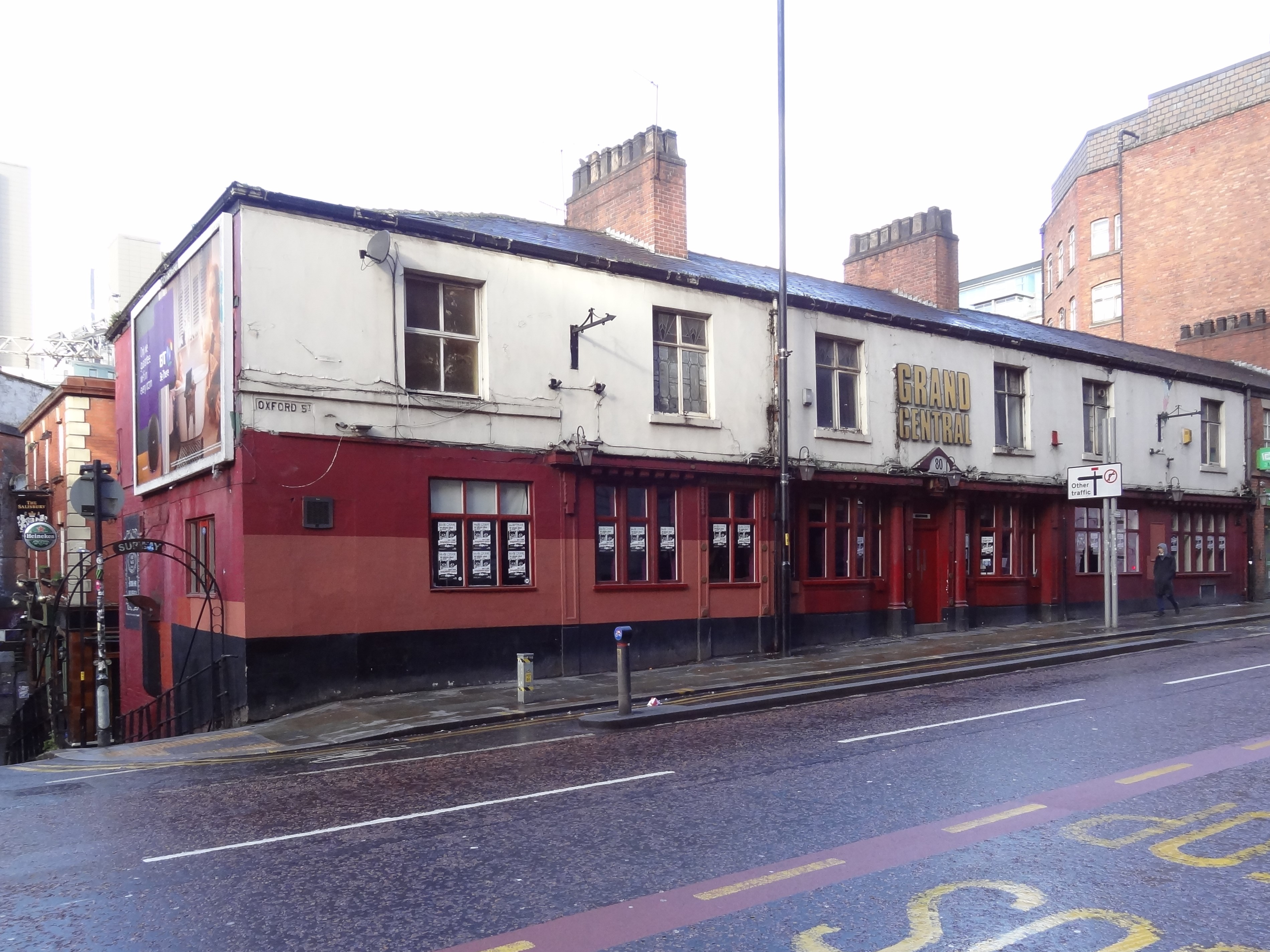
- The pub in 2019
- Former names: Beef & Barley; Oxford Bar; Cork & Screw; Shady Lady

General information
- Type: Public house
- Location: Oxford Street, Manchester, England
- Coordinates: 53.4740°N 2.2409°W

Technical details
- Floor count: 3

Other information
- Public transit: Oxford Road station

Website
- grandcentralmanchester.com

Grand Central is a rock and metal pub and music venue on Oxford Street, near Oxford Road station and opposite The Principal Manchester hotel, in Manchester city centre, England. It occupies a three‑storey building with a cellar which is typical of buildings that were originally houses in the late 18th and early 19th centuries. Wakefield Street on the south side leads to the station via a pedestrian stairway.

== History ==
The name "Grand Central" is relatively new and was adopted because of the nearness of Oxford Road station, alluding to New York's Grand Central Station. Until the renaming the pub was the Beef & Barley and included a separate steak bar, having been modernised in the late 1960s. The beer stocked at that time was Watney/Wilsons from Wilsons Newton Heath Brewery. Earlier still the pub was called the Oxford Bar.

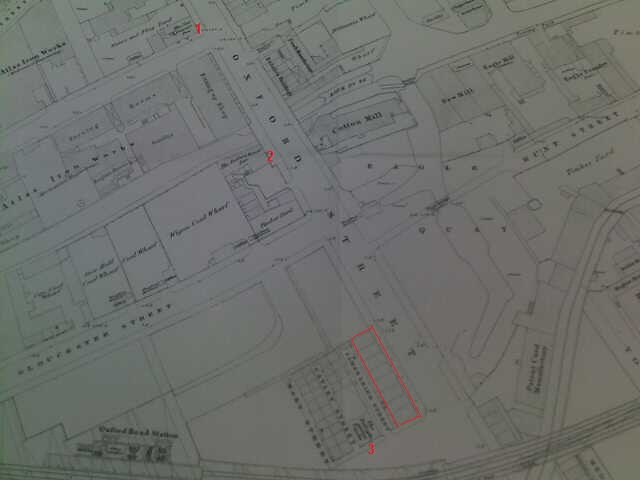
1849 Map of Oxford Street: 1) New Concert Inn, 2) Oxford Road Inn, 3) Tulloghgorum Vaults, Outline) Grand Central site (houses)

The oldest records found featuring Grand Central suggest that it was originally eight separate residential properties. This is shown in an 1849 map of Oxford Street.

Nineteenth‑century directories and census returns record a mixture of uses at the site, including eating houses, dining rooms and domestic accommodation. By the 1860s the premises were run by Peter and Hannah Bostock, who remained associated with the property for several decades. Later records list a succession of residents, servants and tradespeople, reflecting the building's mixed commercial and residential character before its development as licensed premises in the early 20th century.

First-hand accounts recall 80 Oxford Street being known as The Oxford Wine Bar in 1953, and later in 1960 as simply The Oxford. In 1970 it became the Beef & Barley, a steak house, and a year later in 1971 A Schooner Inn was added to the Beef & Barley pub sign. Between 1977 and 1978 it was known as the Cork & Screw and it became The Shady Lady in the late 1970s.

The pub was refurbished in 2004 and has since hosted Carved Photography's exhibition of work by Sabrina Ramdoyal, featuring bands from Manchester's rock and metal scene as well as touring acts. The venue currently offers a pool table, jukebox and two fruit machines. A downstairs club called Subway formerly operated on the premises, but closed before 2002.

The pub was formerly used as a meeting point for customers on their way to Jilly's Rockworld (originally Rafters nightclub) in St James Buildings at 65A Oxford Street. Since Rockworld's closure in early 2010, this association has ended.

Every Thursday night the pub hosts live music in partnership with Rocksector Records, usually featuring three or four bands, with free entry. Grand Central has also hosted the annual Battle for Bloodstock competition, in which 36 local bands compete over several heats and finals for a performance slot at the Bloodstock Open Air Festival in Derby.

=== The Beer Scare of 1900 ===
Peter Bostock was among several licensees in this area of Manchester who were suspected of unknowingly selling adulterated beer in 1900. The poisoned beer resulted in outbreaks of peripheral neuritis caused by arsenic poisoning that was traced by the Royal Commission to the raw materials found in brewing sugars at a refiners in Liverpool called Bostock & Co. of Garston (not thought to be a relation of the licensee). The company used a process involving sulphuric acid (made from arsenical iron pyrites) to manufacture glucose. Upon these findings, the Royal Commission recommended that 'a legal maximum of not more than one-hundredth of a grain of arsenic per gallon of liquid per pound of solid food be enforced'. By this point the damage had been done and up to four grains of arsenic were being found per pound of brewing sugar. The beer scare of 1900 has been mentioned in various articles on medical science, such as the Journal of the American Medical Association, where it was stated that over 2,000 people received medical treatment for peripheral neuritis. It is widely believed that the scare affected 6,000 people and killed 70.

=== Ghosts ===
Most residents of 80 Oxford Street are buried in Manchester's Southern Cemetery. There have only been two deaths recorded at this address; Peter Bostock in 1904 and Hannah Bostock in 1893, and one listed birth; Mabel Lewis in 1910. However, many customers and staff have reported apparent ghost sightings over the years at the pub.

=== Little Ireland ===
Grand Central exists on the periphery of what was once known as 'Little Ireland'. Containing mainly poorly skilled Irish immigrants it became Manchester's oldest, smallest and most short-lived Irish slum, where people lived in cramped, unhygienic conditions. In the 1820s the first immigrants moved there, and lived in the small streets off the main thoroughfare such as James Leigh Street which is located behind Grand Central. By the mid-1840s they were moved on and the area was demolished to make way for the industrious Victorian capitalists in their attempts to build the Manchester South Junction Railway line, which remains there to this day. In his book titled The Condition of the Working Class in England in 1844 social scientist Friedrich Engels wrote unfavourably about his experience of Little Ireland in Manchester in his book, claiming it was a 'horrid little slum'. Regardless of this, Little Ireland became world-famous, and the term itself became a generic shorthand for Irish living in slum housing throughout the 19th century industrial world.
