= Hvalsmoen =

Former military camp in Buskerud County, Norway

Coordinates: 60°12′N 10°18′E

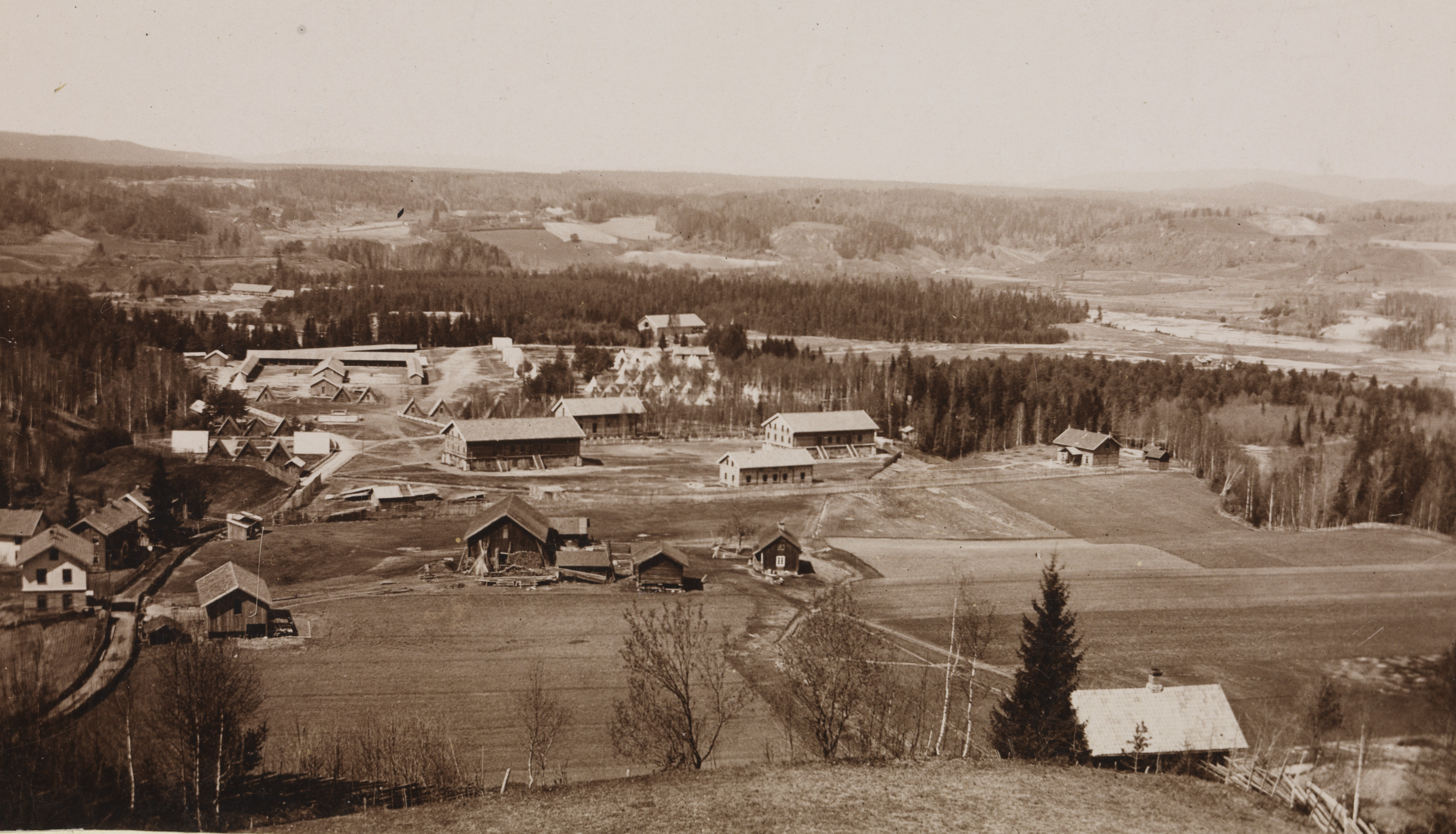
No-nb bldsa 5e015

Hvalsmoen was the site of a former military camp to the north of Hønefoss in Ringerike in Buskerud county, Norway.

In 1893, the Norwegian Parliament resolved to establish a military training camp to train engineer troops for the national Army. The camp was the base for the Army engineering regiment (Hærens ingeniørregiment). There were formerly a total of three military camps around Hønefoss: Hvalsmoen, Helgelandsmoen and Eggemoen. All were closed on June 13, 2001. In 2005, the camp was sold to local investment firm Røysi Invest for 52 million kroner.
