= Jaren Station =

Railway station in Gran, Norway

Jaren
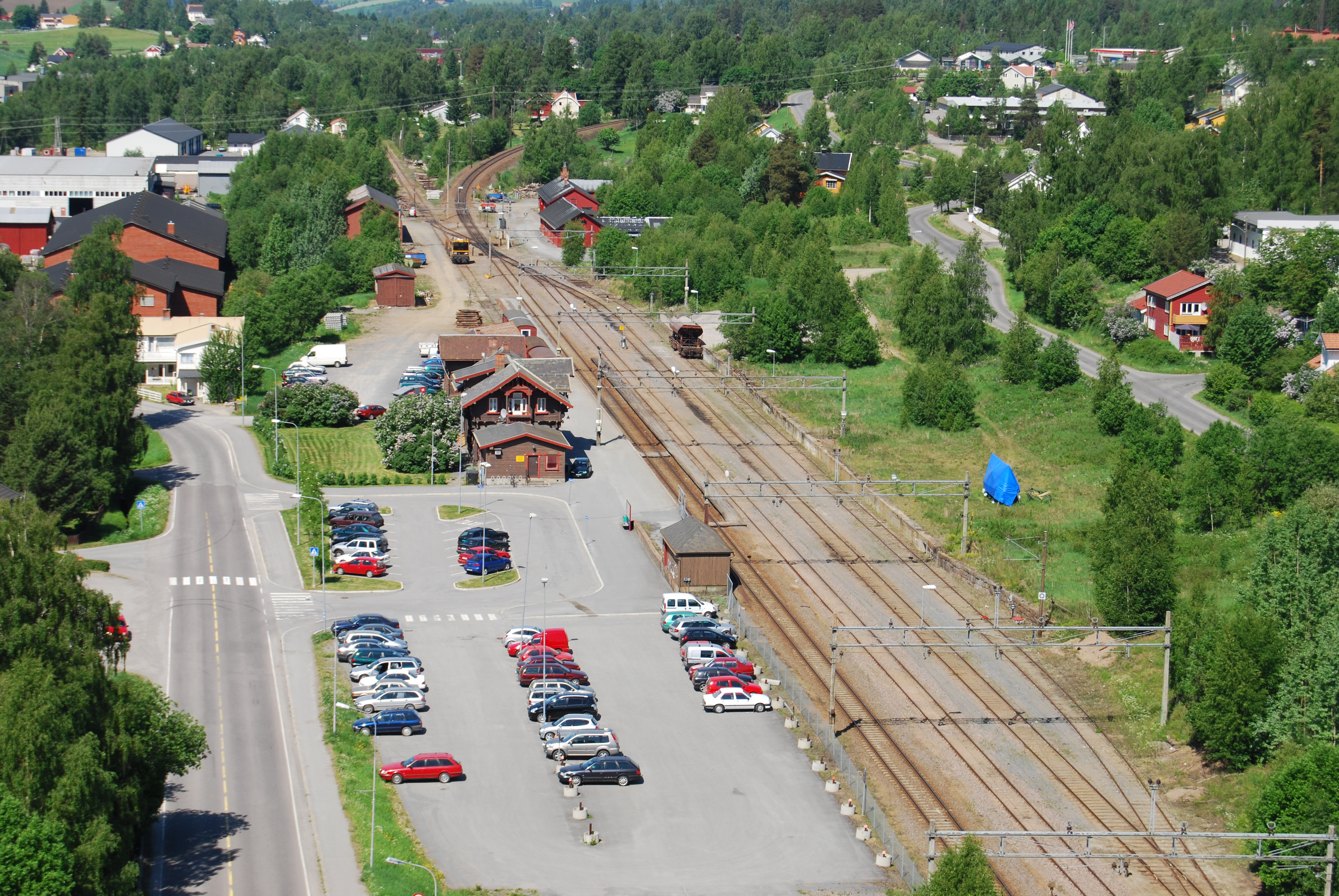

General information
- Location: Jaren, Gran Municipality; Norway
- Coordinates: 60.392975°N 10.555758°E
- Elevation: 207.2 m (680 ft) AMSL
- Owner: Bane NOR
- Operator: Vy Gjøvikbanen
- Line: Gjøvik Line
- Distance: 71.92 km (44.69 mi)
- Platforms: 2
- Connections: Bus: Innlandstrafikk

Other information
- Station code: JAR

History
- Opened: 20 December 1900
Location

Jaren Station (Norwegian: Jaren stasjon) is a railway station located at Jaren in Gran Municipality, Innlandet county, Norway. The station is the terminus for the Oslo Commuter Rail, but is also served by regional trains that continue to Gjøvik. Both services are provided by Vy Gjøvikbanen.

== History ==
The station was opened in 1900 as a station on the North Line between Grefsen and Røykenvik. In 1902 the extension from Jaren to Gjøvik was finished, and the line changed name to the Gjøvik Line. The branch line to Røykenvik too the name Røykenvik Line. The branch was abandoned in 1957.

The restaurant was taken over by Norsk Spisevognselskap on 15 January 1930, but was privatized again from 15 October 1944.

Preceding station			Following station
Gran	Gjøvik Line		Bleiken
Preceding station	Regional trains		Following station
Gran	RE30	Oslo S–Gjøvik	Bleiken
Preceding station	Local trains		Following station
Gran	R31	Oslo S–Jaren	—
