= Roa, Norway =

Administrative centre of Lunner Municipality, Norway

Coordinates: 60°17′17″N 10°36′42″E

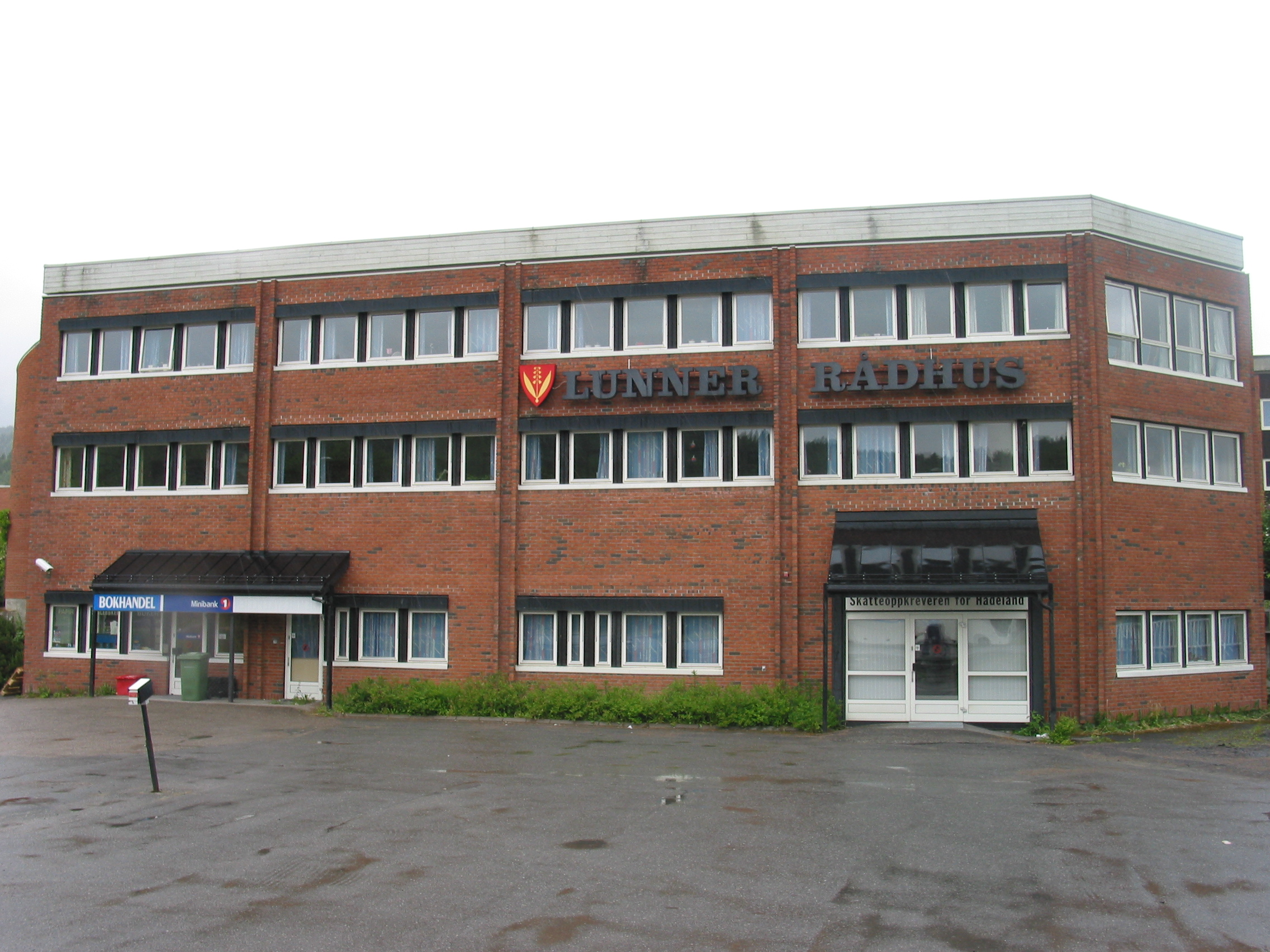
Lunner town hall.

Roa is the administrative centre of the Lunner municipality, in Akershus, Norway. Together, with the village Lunner, it forms an urban area with a population of 1,576. The Gjøvik Line goes through Roa, with trains stopping at Roa Station.
