= Harestua Station (1901–2012) =

Former railway station in Norway

Harestua
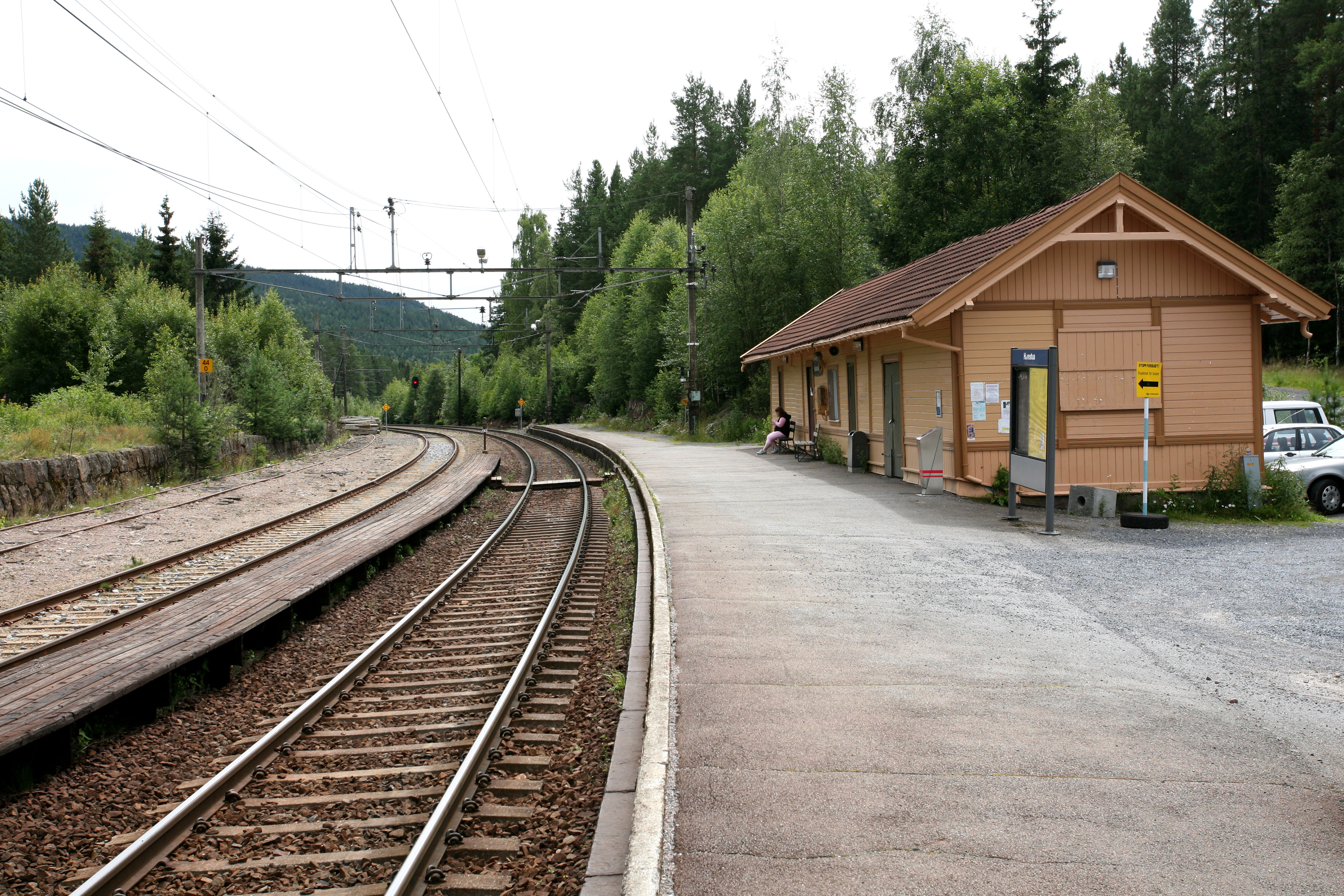

General information
- Location: Harestua, Lunner; Norway
- Coordinates: 60.192444°N 10.723085°E
- Elevation: 261.4 m (858 ft)
- Owner: Norwegian National Rail Administration
- Operator: NSB Gjøvikbanen
- Line: Gjøvik Line
- Distance: 44.03 km
- Platforms: 2

Construction
- Architect: Paul Armin Due

History
- Opened: 1 September 1901
- Closed: 2012
Location

Harestua Station (Norwegian: Harestua stasjon) was located on the Gjøvik Line at Harestua in Norway. The station was opened as Harestuen in 1901 as a stop for passengers and freight one years ahead of the opening of the Gjøvik Line in 1902. In 1971, the station became fully automatized and remote controlled. There were no ticket machines at the station.

The railway station closed on 9 December 2012 when the new station was opened.

Preceding station		Following station
Stryken	Gjøvik Line	Furumo
