= Grua Station =

Railway station in Lunner, Norway

Grua
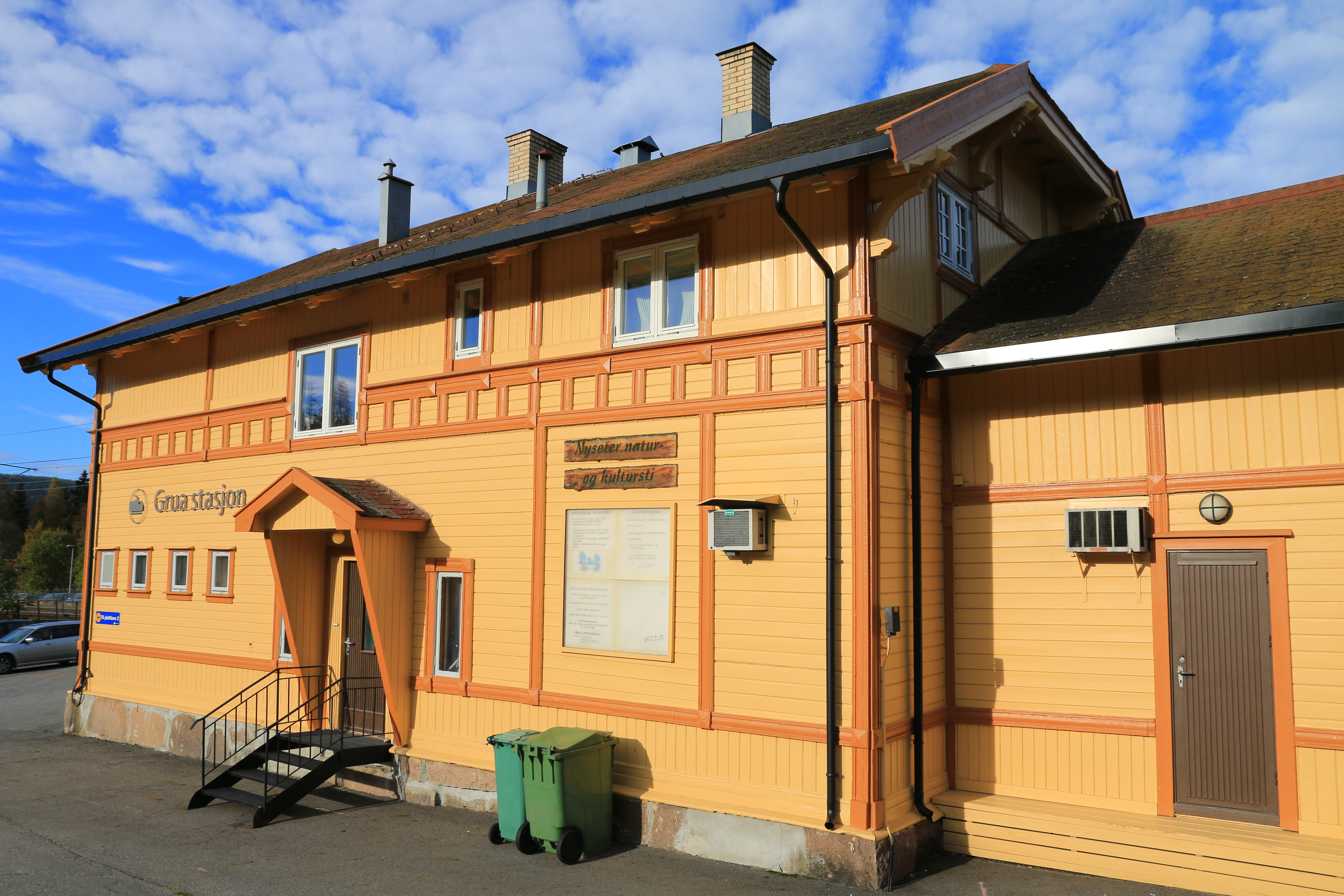
- Grua Station

General information
- Location: Grua, Lunner; Norway
- Coordinates: 60.258413°N 10.664463°E
- Elevation: 371.1 m (1,218 ft)
- Owner: Bane NOR
- Operator: Vy Gjøvikbanen
- Line: Gjøvik Line
- Distance: 53.39 km
- Platforms: 2

Construction
- Architect: Paul Armin Due

History
- Opened: 1 September 1901
Location

Grua Station (Norwegian: Grua stasjon) is located on the Gjøvik Line at Grua in Norway. The station was opened in 1901 as part of the line.

| Preceding station | | | Following station |
|---|---|---|---|
| Furumo; Rundelen | Gjøvik Line | | Roa |
| Preceding station | Regional trains | | Following station |
| Harestua | RE30 | Oslo S–Gjøvik | Roa |
| Preceding station | Local trains | | Following station |
| Furumo | R31 | Oslo S–Jaren | Roa |
