= Reinsvoll Station =

Railway station in Vestre Toten, Norway

Reinsvoll
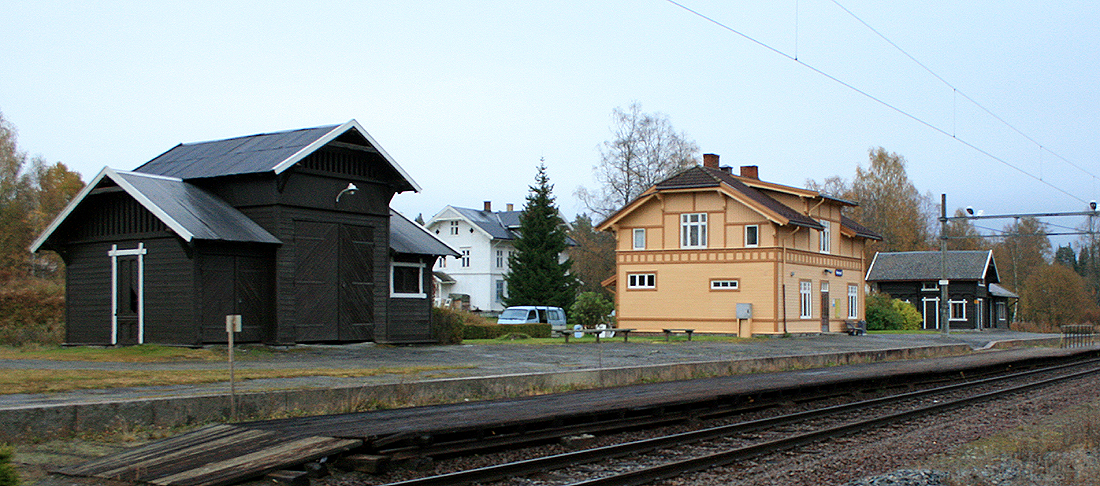

General information
- Location: Reinsvoll, Vestre Toten Municipality; Norway
- Coordinates: 60.678663°N 10.61651°E
- Elevation: 356.1 m (1,168 ft)
- Owner: Bane NOR
- Operator: Vy Gjøvikbanen
- Line: Gjøvik Line
- Distance: 106.65 km (66.27 mi)
- Platforms: 2

History
- Opened: 23 December 1901
Location

Reinsvoll Station (Norwegian: Reinsvoll stasjon) is located on the Gjøvik Line at Reinsvoll in Vestre Toten Municipality, Norway.

The station was opened on 23 December 1901 as Reinsvolden. From 28 November 1902 it was renamed Reinsvold, and from April 1921 it received the current name. Until 1987, it also served as the terminal station of the Skreia Line. It has a waiting room with limited open hours.

| Preceding station | | | Following station |
|---|---|---|---|
| Eina | Gjøvik Line | | Raufoss |
| — | Skreia Line | | Bøverbru |
| Preceding station | Regional trains | | Following station |
| Eina | RE30 | Oslo S–Gjøvik | Raufoss |
