= Elnes Station =

Railway station in Nittedal, Norway

Elnes
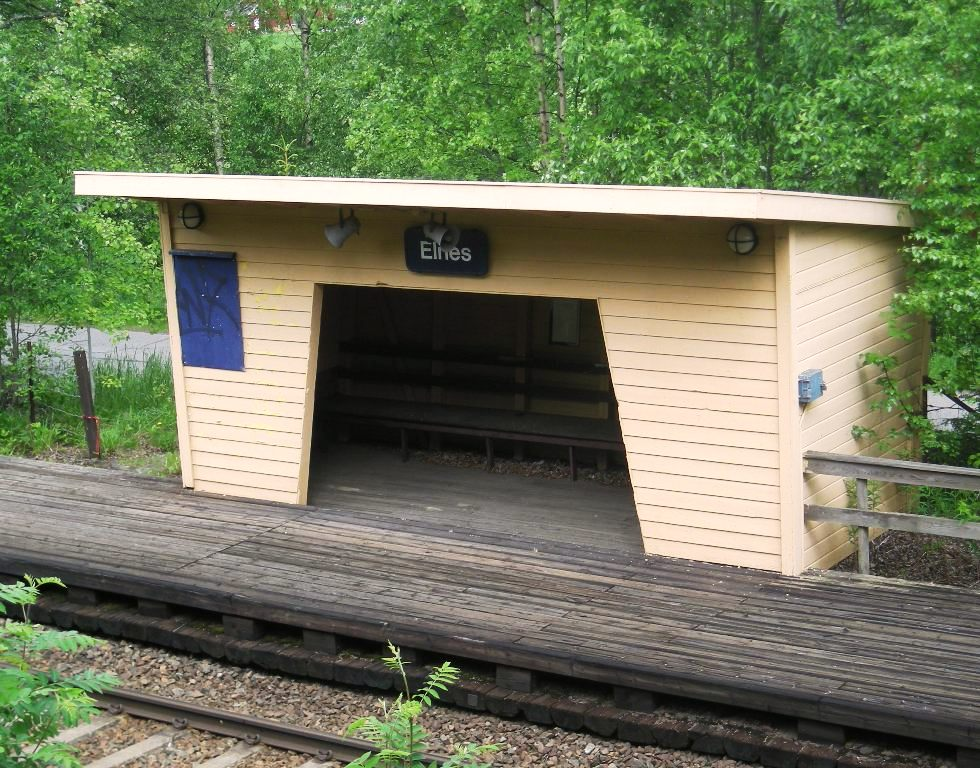

General information
- Location: Elnes, Nittedal; Norway
- Coordinates: 60°07′49″N 10°47′44″E
- Elevation: 238.8 m (783 ft)
- Owner: Norwegian National Rail Administration
- Operator: NSB Gjøvikbanen
- Line: Gjøvik Line
- Distance: 34.48 km
- Platforms: 1

History
- Opened: 1932
Location

Elnes Station (Norwegian: Elnes holdeplass) is an abandoned railway station on the Gjøvik Line at Elnes in Lunner, Norway. The station opened in 1932. After NSB Gjøvikbanen took over operations of the line on 11 June 2006, services to the station were terminated and it was closed.

Preceding station		Following station
Hakadal	Gjøvik Line	Stryken
