= Eina Station =

Railway station in Vestre Toten, Norway

Eina
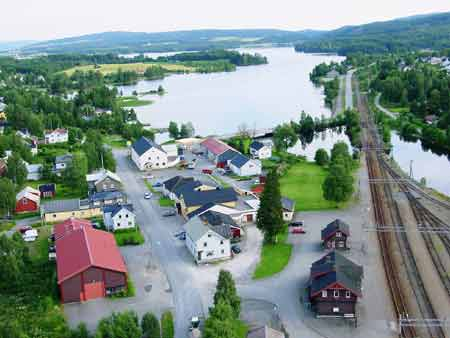

General information
- Location: Eina, Vestre Toten Municipality; Norway
- Coordinates: 60.630516°N 10.597463°E
- Elevation: 401.3 m (1,317 ft)
- Owner: Bane NOR
- Operator: Vy Gjøvikbanen
- Lines: Gjøvik Line; Valdres Line
- Distance: 100.89 km (62.69 mi)
- Platforms: 3
- Connections: Bus: Innlandstrafikk

History
- Opened: 23 December 1901
Location

Eina Station (Norwegian: Eina stasjon) is located in Eina in Vestre Toten Municipality, Norway. The station is located on the Gjøvik Line, in addition to being the terminus of the now abandoned Valdres Line. It was opened on 23 December 1901 with the opening of the North Line (now Gjøvik Line).

The station is served by local trains to Oslo Central Station and Gjøvik Station by Vy Gjøvikbanen.

Preceding station			Following station
Bleiken; Hågår	Gjøvik Line		Reinsvoll
—	Valdres Line		Hov
Preceding station	Regional trains		Following station
Bleiken	RE30	Oslo S–Gjøvik	Reinsvoll
