= Norwegian National Road 4 =

Road in Norway

Coordinates: 60°27′21″N 10°38′40″E

National Road 4
- Bokmål: Riksvei 4 Nynorsk: Riksveg 4

Route information
- Maintained by Norwegian Public Roads Administration
- Length: 137 km (85 mi)

Major junctions
- North end: Biri, Gjøvik Municipality
- E6 – Hamar, Lillehammer; E16 – Jessheim, Hønefoss; Rv150 (Ring 3) – Oslo
- South end: Sinsen, Oslo Municipality

Location
- Country: Norway

Highway system
- Roads in Norway; National Roads; County Roads
← Rv3	→ Rv5

Norwegian National Road 4 (Norwegian: Riksvei 4, Rv4) is a national road in Norway which is the main route north from the capital city of Oslo to the junction with the European route E6 highway at the village of Biri in Gjøvik Municipality. The road runs through Nittedal, Hadeland, and Toten to its terminus on the shore of the lake Mjøsa. In 2021, the government began studying ways to improve the road to allieviate traffic problems.

== Route ==
The southern terminus of the road is at a roundabout intersection where the roads Trondheimsveien and Fagerheimsgata meet in the Sinsen neighborhood of the city of Oslo. The road heads north and continues to be called the Trondheimsveien. The Sinsenkrysset intersection with the Ring 3 highway is less than 1 kilometre (0.62 mi) north of the start of this road. The road continues to the northeast through Groruddalen to Gjelleråsen where it turns to the north-northwest. From Gjelleråsen, it heads through a 2.8-square-kilometre (1.1 sq mi) long underground tunnel that runs under Slattum. The road continues northward through Nittedal Municipality, including the villages of Rotnes, Hakadal, and Harestua. The road follows the western shoreline of the lake Harestuvatnet. In Hadeland, the road joins the European route E16 highway and runs conncurrently with that road through Grua and Roa. On the north side of Roa, the E16 heads east and National Road 4 heads north to Gran and Jaren (a new roadway is under construction in this stretch in 2022). From Jaren, the road runs to the northeast to Lygna where it meets County Road 180. From there, the road runs north to Einavoll and along the east side of the lake Einavatnet to the village of Eina. There is a newly built portion of the highway that has a toll that runs from Reinsvoll centre, past Raufoss to the junction with County Road 33 in Hunndalen. The road continues into the town of Gjøvik, right down to the shores of the lake Mjøsa. From Gjøvik, the road runs along the west side of Mjøsa to the Mjøsa Bridge at Moelv where it joins the European route E6 highway.
