= Nittedal Station =

Railway station in Nittedal, Norway

Nittedal
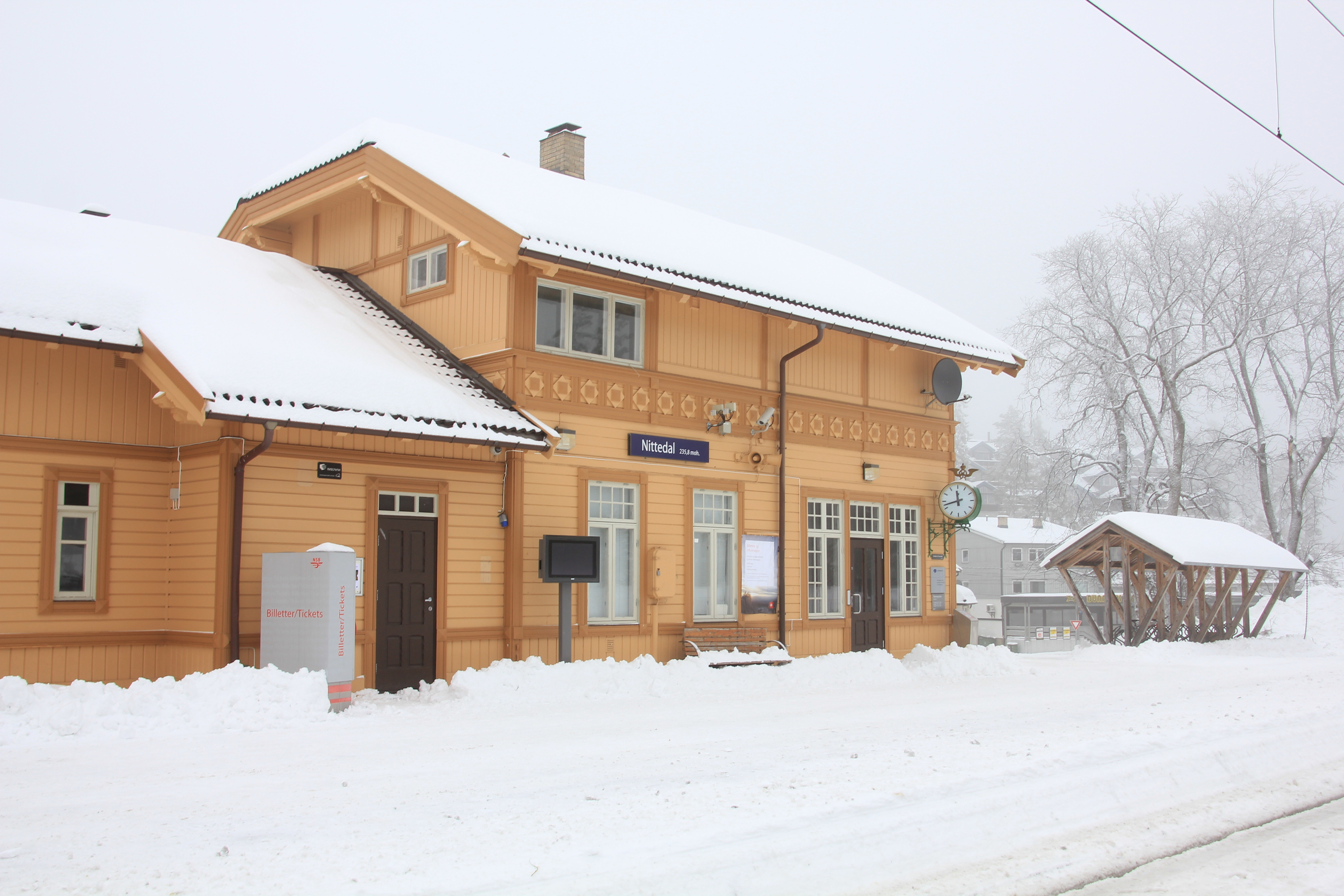

General information
- Location: Rotnes, Akershus, Nittedal; Norway
- Coordinates: 60°03′29″N 10°51′55″E
- Elevation: 235.8
- Owner: Bane NOR
- Operator: Vy Gjøvikbanen
- Line: Gjøvik Line
- Distance: 24.26 km
- Platforms: 2

Construction
- Architect: Paul Armin Due

History
- Opened: 1900
Location

Nittedal Station (Norwegian: Nittedal stasjon) is a railway station on the Gjøvik Line at Rotnes in Akershus county, Norway. The station was opened in 1900 as a stop for passengers and freight two years ahead of the opening of the Gjøvik Line in 1902.

In 1907 Nittedal was upgraded from a stop to a station staffed to expedite trains, passengers and freight. In the years in between a station building was also erected that had been drawn by architect Paul Armin Due. In 1971, after almost 70 years of being in service, the station became fully automated and remotely controlled. In 2022, further upgrades were made to the station.

Today the station is unstaffed and furnished with ticket machines. Its elevation is 235.8 m AMSL and the distance to Oslo Central Station is 24.26 km. The main building now serves as a café.

The station is reportedly haunted, and it was featured on the Norwegian television show "Åndenes Makt", a show about paranormal activities.

Preceding station			Following station
Movatn	Gjøvik Line		Åneby
Preceding station	Regional trains		Following station
Kjelsås	RE30	Oslo S–Gjøvik	Harestua
Preceding station	Local trains		Following station
Movatn	R31	Oslo S–Jaren	Åneby
