= Varingskollen =

Mountain in Norway

Coordinates: 60°06′N 10°50′E

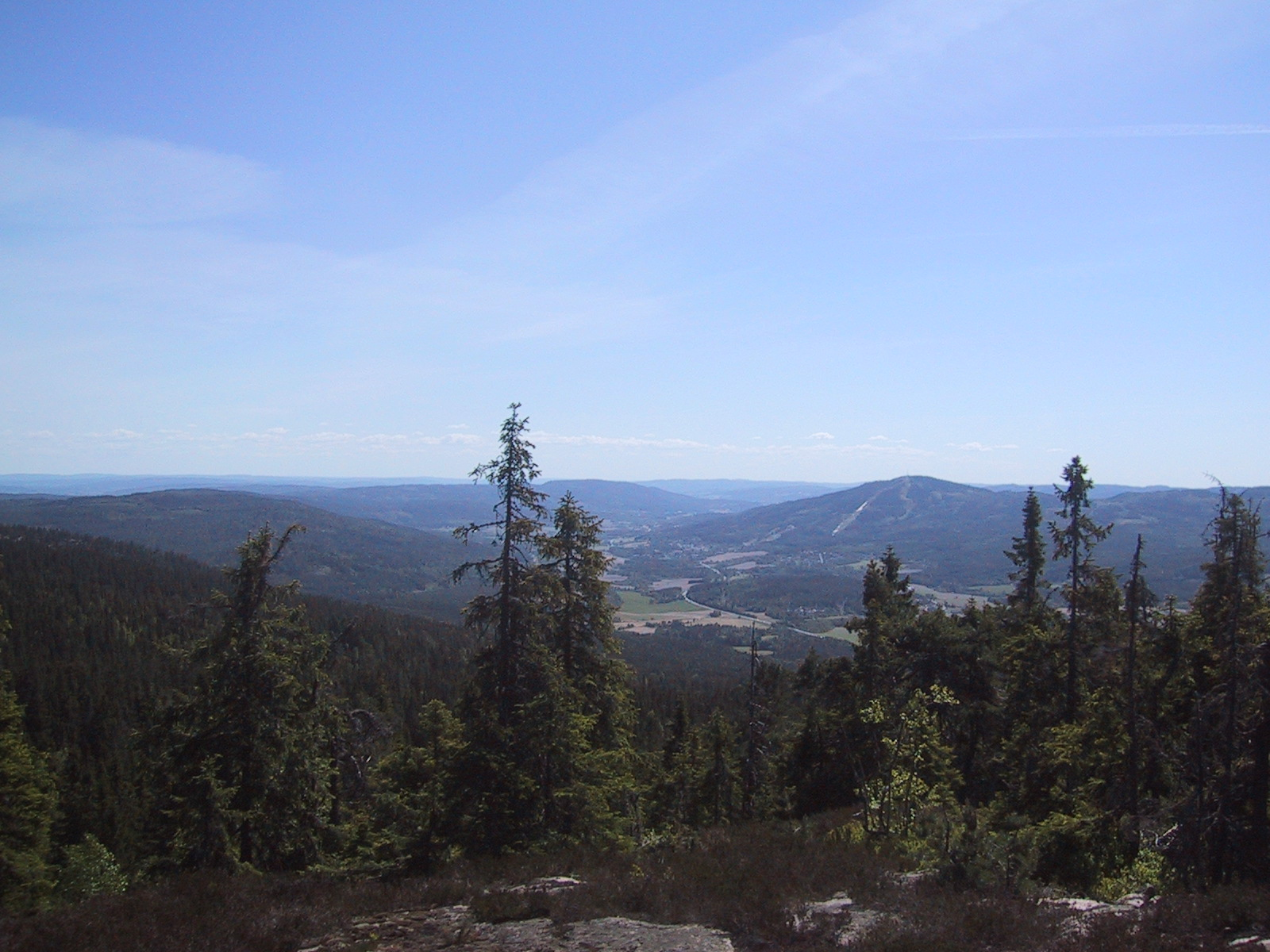
- View of Hakadal from Rundkollen. The varnish on the right of the image.

Highest point
- Elevation: 546 m (1,791 ft)

Geography
- Location: Akershus, Norway

Varingskollen is a mountain of Akershus, Norway. It is situated above the village of Hakadal in Nittedal. it is the site of the Varingskollen ski resort located 25 minutes by train from Oslo on the Gjøvik Line with exit at the Hakadal Station.

Varingskollen ski resort consists of six slopes in total, with a FIS approved Giant Slalom / Slalom course called Olaløypa (black course) as the main feature. This slope is 1250 metres long, descending 350 metres from the Varingskollen summit to the valley below. In addition, there are two red courses (Kariløypa - 1600 metres, Terrengparken - 400 metres), one blue course (Hakkebakken, 500 metres), and two green courses (Trollparken - 500 metres, Barnebakken - 100 metres).

Varingskollen ski resort has three cafeterias, slopes for cross country skiing and ski rental possibilities. In the summer, the mountain is used for mountain biking, hiking and wildlife spotting.
