= Åneby Station =

Railway station in Nittedal, Norway

Åneby
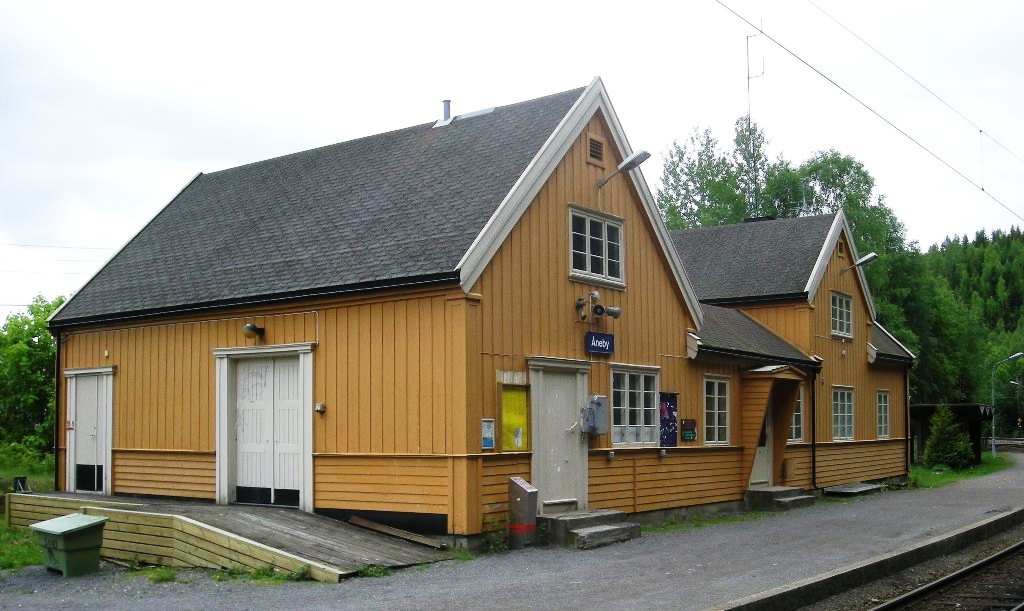

General information
- Location: Åneby, Nittedal, Akershus; Norway
- Coordinates: 60°05′09″N 10°51′46″E
- Owner: Bane NOR
- Operator: Vy Gjøvikbanen
- Line: Gjøvik Line
- Platforms: 2

History
- Opened: 1905
Location

Åneby Station is a railway station on the Gjøvik Line at Nittedal in Akershus, Norway. The station was opened in 1905 as a stop, three years after the line's opening in 1902. In 1945, the stop was upgraded to a station, but since 1972 the station has been unstaffed and remote controlled.

Although there are no ticket sales at the station fares may be purchased on the train.

| Preceding station | | | Following station |
|---|---|---|---|
| Nittedal | Gjøvik Line | | Varingskollen |
| Preceding station | Local trains | | Following station |
| Nittedal | R31 | Oslo S–Jaren | Varingskollen |
