= Hakadal Station =

Railway station in Hakadal, Norway

Hakadal/Varingskollen
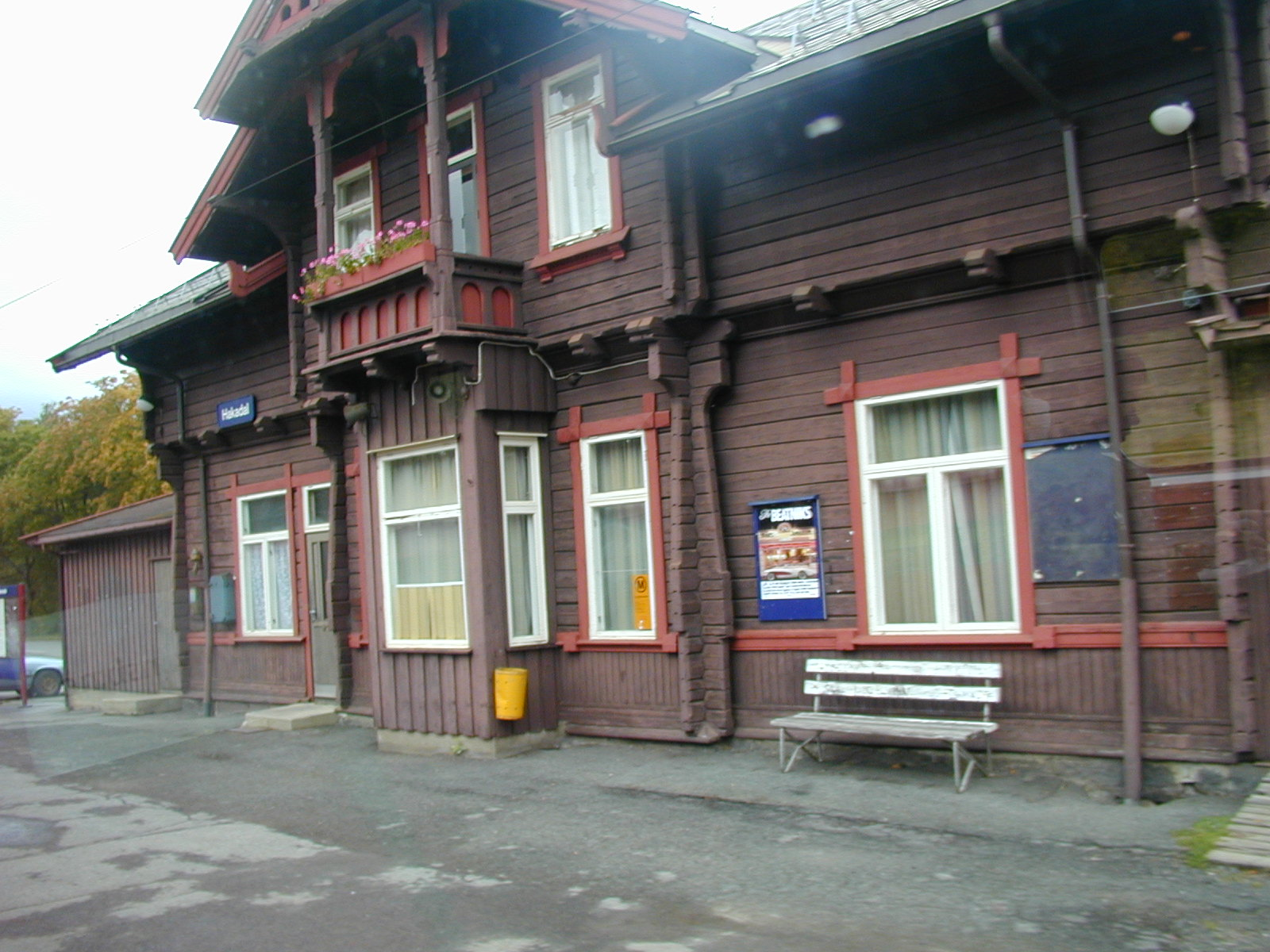

General information
- Location: Hakadal, Nittedal; Norway
- Coordinates: 60.117327°N 10.829356°E
- Elevation: 166.6 m (547 ft)
- Owner: Bane NOR
- Operator: Vy Gjøvikbanen
- Line: Gjøvik Line
- Distance: 32.07 km
- Platforms: 2

Construction
- Architect: Paul Armin Due

Other information
- Station code: HAK

History
- Opened: 20 December 1900
Location

Hakadal/Varingskollen Station (Norwegian: Hakadal stasjon) is located on the Gjøvik Line at Hakadal in Norway. The station was opened as Hakedal in 1900 as a stop for passengers and freight, two years ahead of the opening of the Gjøvik Line in 1902. In 1971, the station became fully automatized and remote controlled. There is no ticket machine at the station.

== Sources ==
- Entry at Jernbaneverket (in English)
- Entry at the Norwegian Railway Club (in Norwegian)

| Preceding station | | | Following station |
|---|---|---|---|
| Åneby | Gjøvik Line | | Harestua; Stryken |
| Preceding station | Local trains | | Following station |
| Nittedal | R31 | Oslo S–Jaren | Harestua |
