= Hadeland (newspaper) =

Norwegian local newspaper

- Owner(s): Amedia (100%)
- Founded: 1918
- Headquarters: Grua, Norway
- Website: hadeland.net

Hadeland is a daily, regional newspaper published in Grua, Norway since 1918. With a circulation of 7,481, it covers the region of Hadeland, including Gran Municipality, Lunner Municipality, and Jevnaker Municipality. The newspaper is owned by A-Pressen.
