= Harestua Station =

Railway station in Lunner, Norway

Harestua
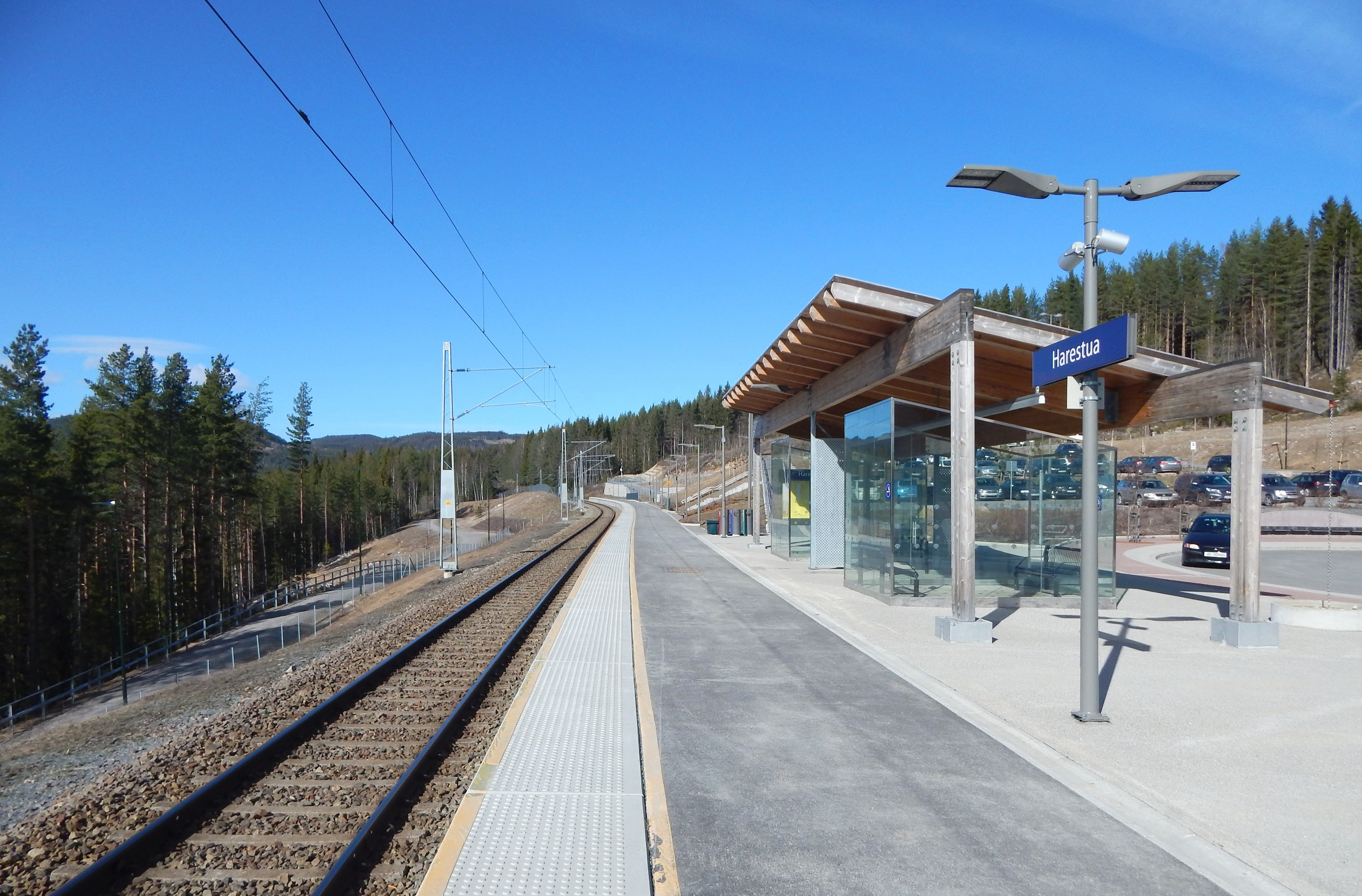

General information
- Location: Piperveien; Harestua, Lunner; Norway
- Coordinates: 60.1924°N 10.7231°E
- Owner: Bane NOR
- Operator: Vy Gjøvikbanen
- Line: Gjøvik Line
- Distance: 45.5 km (28.3 mi) from Oslo S
- Platforms: 1 side platform
- Tracks: 1

History
- Opened: 3 June 1984
- Rebuilt: 9 December 2012
Location
- Location within Oppland Location within Norway

Harestua Station (Norwegian: Harestua holdeplass) is a railway station on the Gjøvik Line at Harestua in Lunner, Norway. Situated at 45.5 kilometers (28.3 mi) from Oslo Central Station (Oslo S), it consists of a side platform along a section of single track. It is served by line L1 of the Oslo Commuter Rail and regional trains on line R30, both operated by Vy Gjøvikbanen, each operating every two hours.

The station opened about 200 meters (660 ft) to the north on 3 June 1984 and was originally named Furumo. In 2012 work started on building a new station, which would replace both the old Furumo Station and the old Harestua Station. The new Furumo Station opened on 9 December 2012 and took the name Harestua on 15 December 2013.

== History ==
The Gjøvik Line through Lunner opened on 20 December 1900. The southern part of the municipality was originally served by Harestua Station, a station situated at 44.03 kilometers (27.36 mi) from Oslo. The Furumo area started receiving new single dwelling residential construction through the 1960s. With the construction of Furumo II and III, it became common for people to commute to the capital. The largest project was Furumo IV, where construction commenced in 1978. This was instrumental for NSB to decide to establish a second station at Harestua, to serve the new residential area. Furumo Station opened on 3 June 1984. The same day Viubråten Station, situated 1.4 kilometers (0.9 mi) to the north, was closed. The original location of Furumo Station was at 45.74 kilometers (28.42 mi) from Oslo S, and was in a curve.

A 2012 report showed that there were about 600 people living within 1-kilometer (0.62 mi) of Harestua Station and 900 within the same radius from Furumo. The old Furumo Station had 1,500 people living within 2 kilometers (1.2 mi). Furumo had 38,300 passengers per year while Harestua had 89,200. Part of the traffic to Harestua was generated by the good access to the wilderness. However, it was in poor technical condition and had a requirement to receive a new and longer platform. The Norwegian National Rail Administration therefore decided to merge the two stations and located it at a new site. This new site is planned as the new community and commercial center for Harestua. The passing loop would be retained at the old station, so the merger would not cut running times.

Construction commenced in April 2012, when the old Furumo Station was closed and work on the new station could begin. the main contractor was Peab. In addition to a new platform, the work consists of 1.1 kilometers (0.68 mi) of new county road, to culverts under the track, ramps allowing wheeled access the platform area, new parking places including a kiss and ride and a new waiting room. To install the culverts all train traffic past the stop had to cease. Total price for the project was 40 million Norwegian krone. The new Furumo Station opened on 9 December 2012 alongside the closure of the old Harestua Station. The new station took the name Harestua on 15 December 2013.

== Facilities ==
Harestua Station is situated on the Gjøvik Line, 45.5 kilometers (28.3 mi) from Oslo Central Station, at an elevation of 154.6 meters (507 ft) above mean sea level. The line past Høybråten is single track and electrified and the station does not have a passing loop. The station features a side platforms with a heated shed. The platform is 220 meters (720 ft) long and 76 centimeters (30 in) tall. There are 95 parking spaces at the station, including charging stations for electric cars and disabled parking, a halt for buses and a park and ride. The station is built according to standards for accessibility.

Harestua is a predominantly residential area with a high proportion of commuters. In addition to this, the station also is located near an access point to the ski trail network of the Association for the Promotion of Skiing in Nordmarka, making it attractive to serve people for skiing outings.

== Service ==
The station is served by lines L3 of Oslo Commuter Rail and R30 regional trains, both operated by NSB Gjøvikbanen using Class 69 trains. The lines operate every twice every two hours, with 40 and 80 minutes between departures. Both operate southwards to Oslo Central Station; L3 operates north to Jaren Station while R30 runs the entire length of the line to Gjøvik Station. Harestua is 44 minutes from Oslo S and 1 hour and 14 minutes from Gjøvik.

== Bibliography ==
- Bjerke, Thor; Holom, Finn (2004). Banedata 2004 (in Norwegian). Hamar / Oslo: Norsk Jernbanemuseum / Norsk Jernbaneklubb. ISBN 82-90286-28-7.
- Ekeberg, Magnus (1997). Harestuas historie (in Norwegian). Lunner: Harestua Vel. ISBN 82-994484-0-9.

Preceding station			Following station
Stryken; Harestua	Gjøvik Line		Grua; Viubråtån
Preceding station	Regional trains		Following station
Stryken	RE30	Oslo S–Gjøvik	Grua
Preceding station	Local trains		Following station
Stryken	R31	Oslo S–Jaren	Grua
