= Bjørgeseter Station =

Railway station in Lunner, Norway

Bjørgeseter
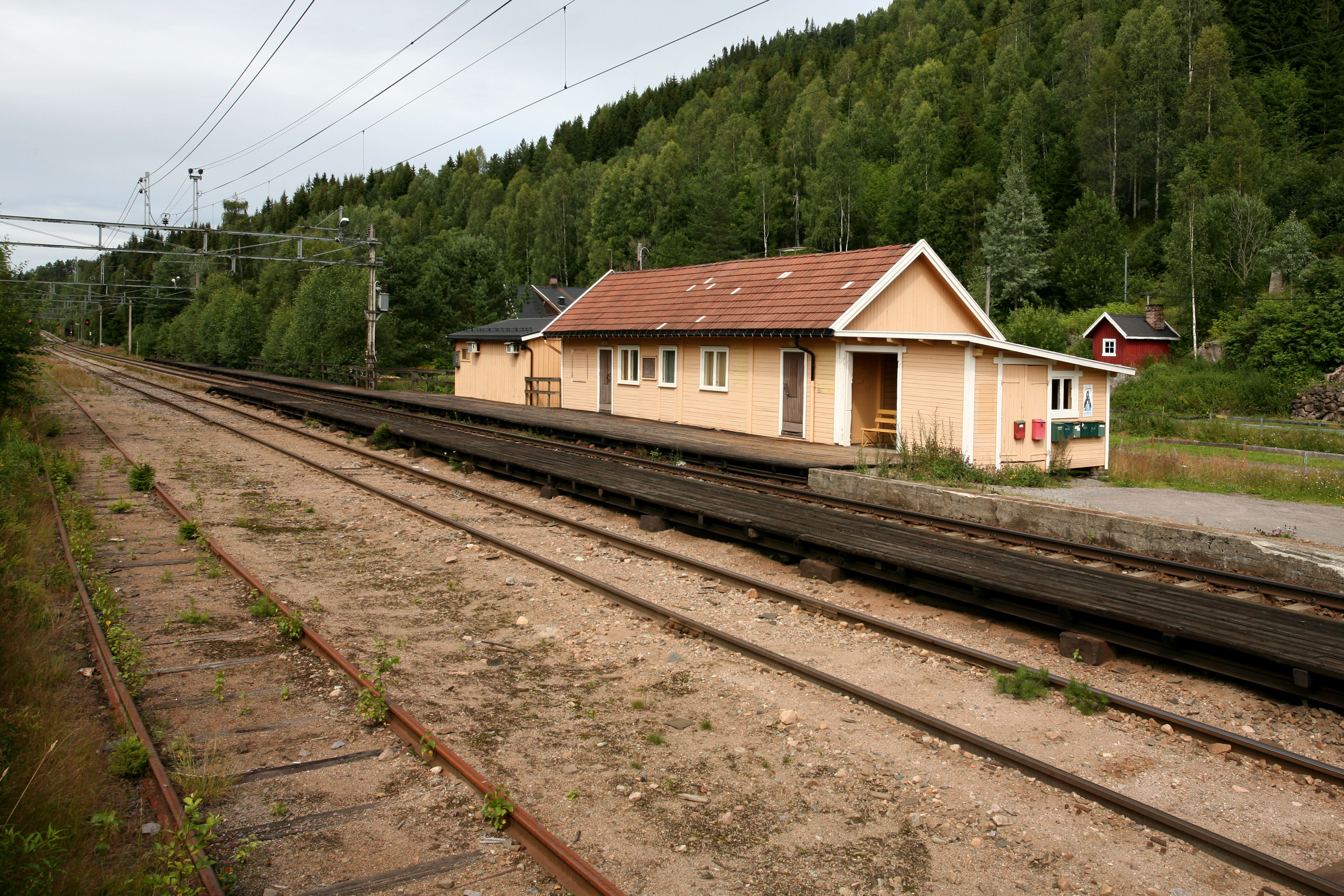

General information
- Location: Bjørgeseter, Lunner; Norway
- Coordinates: 60°14′1″N 10°42′48″E
- Elevation: 322.0 m (1,056.4 ft)
- Owner: Norwegian National Rail Administration
- Line: Gjøvik Line
- Distance: 49.11 km
- Platforms: 2

History
- Opened: 1902
- Closed: 2006
Location

Bjørgeseter Station (Norwegian: Bjørgeseter stasjon) is an abandoned railway station on the Gjøvik Line at Bjørgeseter in Lunner, Norway. The station was opened in 1902 as Bjørgesæter, and received its current name in 1921. The station was closed following NSB Gjøvikbanen taking over operations of the line on 11 June 2006.

Preceding station		Following station
Viubråtån	Gjøvik Line	Rundelen
