= Raufoss Station =

Railway station in Vestre Toten, Norway

Raufoss
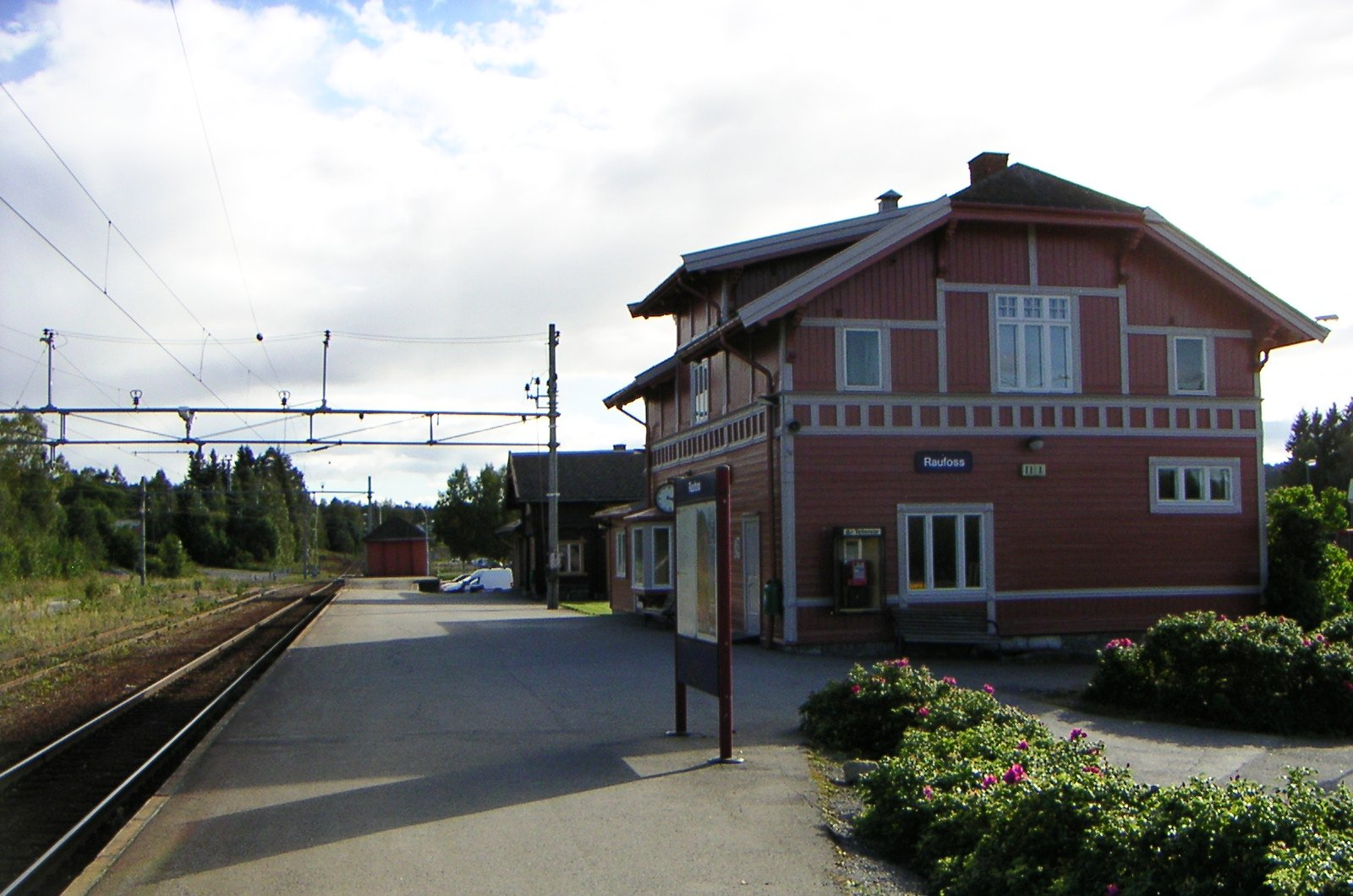

General information
- Location: Raufoss, Vestre Toten Municipality; Norway
- Coordinates: 60.722144°N 10.613617°E
- Elevation: 317.4 m (1,041 ft)
- Owner: Bane NOR
- Operator: Vy Gjøvikbanen
- Line: Gjøvik Line
- Distance: 111.70 km (69.41 mi)
- Platforms: 2

History
- Opened: 23 December 1901
Location

Raufoss Station (Norwegian: Raufoss stasjon) is located on the Gjøvik Line at Raufoss in Vestre Toten Municipality, Norway. The station was opened on 23 December 1901 as Raufossen, and received its current name on 28 November 1902. It is served by the R30 line by Vy Gjøvikbanen.

Preceding station			Following station
Reinsvoll	Gjøvik Line		Gjøvik; Breiskallen
Preceding station	Regional trains		Following station
Reinsvoll	RE30	Oslo S–Gjøvik	Gjøvik
