= Stryken Station =

Railway station in Lunner, Norway

Stryken
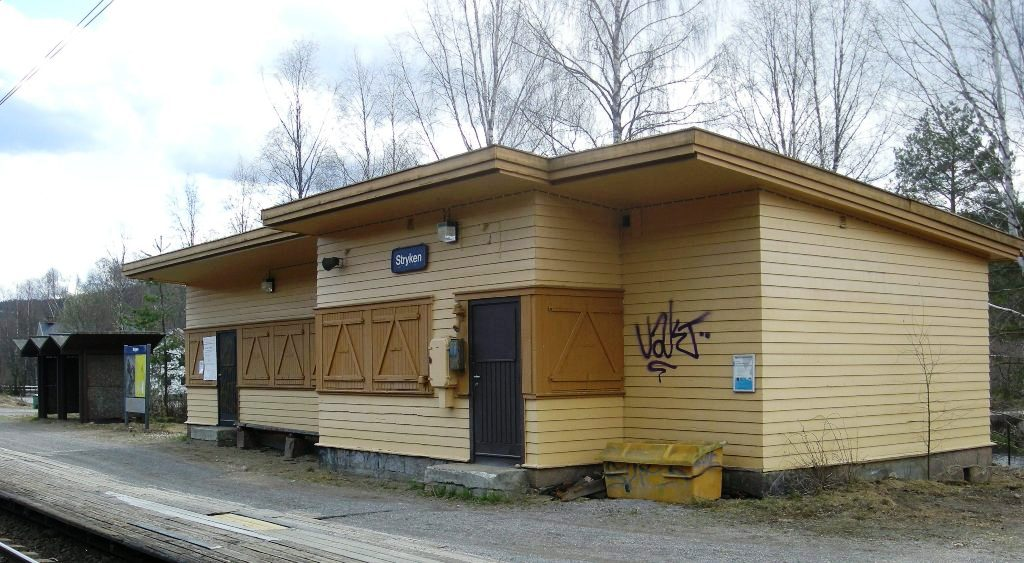

General information
- Location: Stryken, Lunner; Norway
- Coordinates: 60.165783°N 10.720091°E
- Elevation: 238.8 m (783 ft)
- Owner: Bane NOR
- Operator: Vy Gjøvikbanen
- Line: Gjøvik Line
- Distance: 40.83 km
- Platforms: 1

History
- Opened: 1 November 1917
Location

Stryken Station (Norwegian: Stryken stasjon) is located on the Gjøvik Line at Stryken, Lunner, Norway. The station was opened on 1 November 1917, after Vy Gjøvikbanen stated operating of the line on 11 June 2006, but the station has a very limited service, with only selected trains stopping on Saturdays and Sundays during the winter to provide access to the Association for the Promotion of Skiing's extensive ski trail network in Nordmarka.

Preceding station			Following station
Hakadal	Gjøvik Line		Harestua; Elnes
Preceding station	Local trains		Following station
Nittedal	R31	Oslo S–Jaren	Harestua
