= Josef Monsrud =

Norwegian resistance member (1922–2009)

Josef Monsrud (29 May 1922, in Lunner, Oppland – 12 December 2009) was a Norwegian forester and resistance member during World War II.

He hailed from Harestua in Lunner. At the age of twenty he joined the resistance Osvald Group. He went through some initial training and performed sabotage missions in Hadeland before being hired as a guard in the Communist Party of Norway. The party was strictly illegal, and had a secret base in Hemsedal. On 30 October 1942 the guard hut was attacked by German soldiers and Monsrud and fellow resistance fighter Finn Eriksen were captured. Monsrud was incarcerated at Grini from 2 to 24 November, then at Møllergata 19 until February 1943. He went through torture, but survived. Finn Eriksen, who had suffered a gunshot wound, died of the trauma three months later.

The Osvald Group later split with the Communist Party, and Monsrud joined Milorg, working for the Secret Intelligence Service with the illegal radio transmitter Gullfaks. Named after Gullfaxi of Norse mythology, Gullfaks was operated from different places in Bærumsmarka and Nordmarka until the liberation of 8 May 1945. For his efforts the mountain Monsrudnabben in the Heimefrontfjella range in Antarctica was named in his honour.

After the war Monsrud took forester's education at Kongsberg. In 1949 he started working as a forester for Oslo municipality. He was eventually promoted to municipal consultant for wild game. He lived in Maridalen.

He struggled throughout his life with nightmares caused by war and torture, and died in December 2009.
