= Harestua Solar Observatory =

Solar Observatory at Harestua
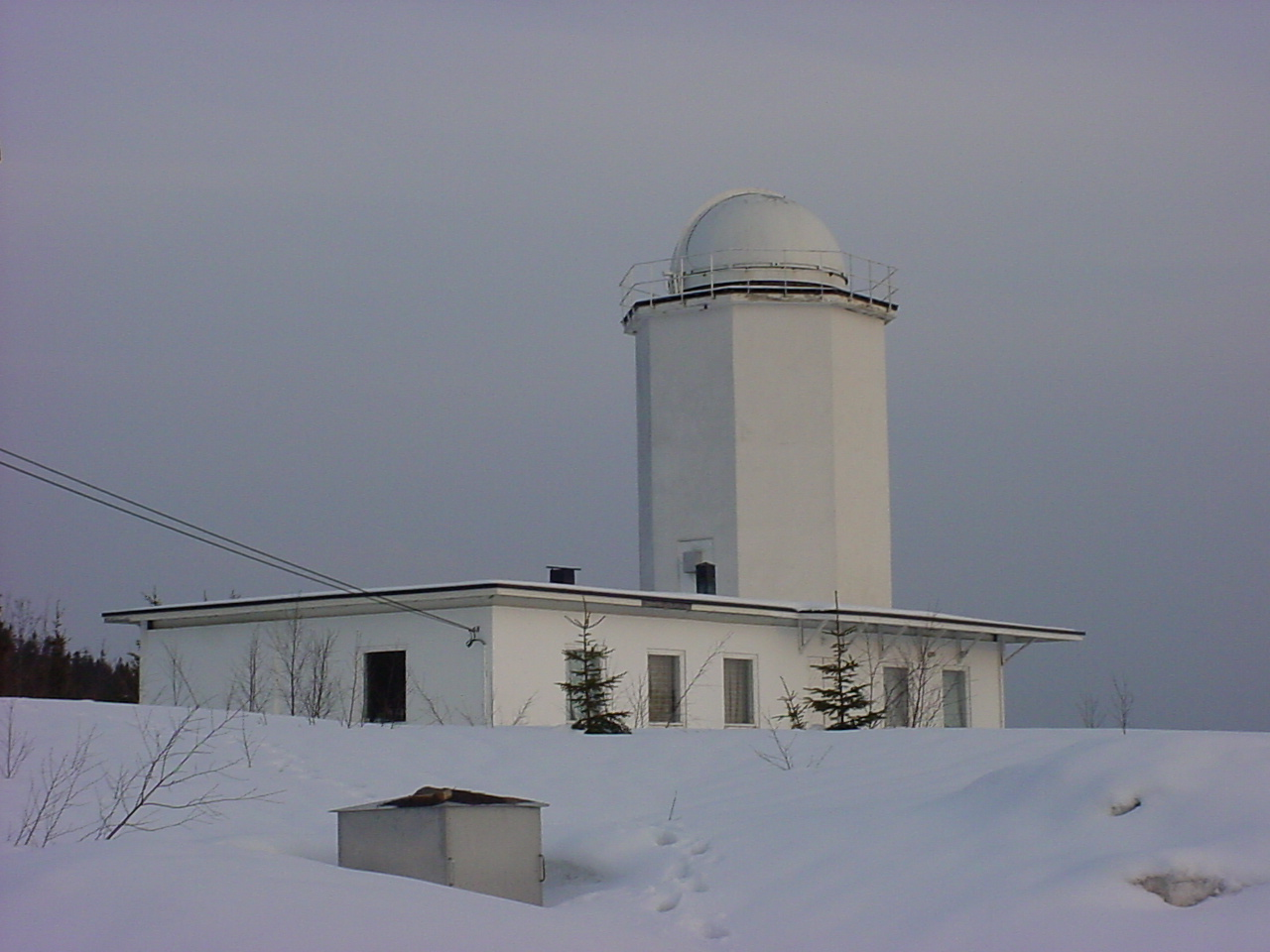
- The solar observatory at Harestua.
- Organization: Tycho Brahe Instituttet AS
- Location: Harestua, Lunner, Oppland, Norway
- Coordinates: 60°12′36″N 10°45′1″E
- Altitude: 588
- Established: 1954
- Website: Official site
- Related media on Commons

Harestua Solar Observatory (Norwegian: Solobservatoriet på Harestua) is a solar observatory near Harestua in the municipality of Lunner, Oppland, Norway.

It was used for solar research purposes from 1954 to 1986, and was subordinated the University of Oslo. From 1987 it has been a dedicated science centre for astronomy education for Norwegian schools and public science events. Since 2008, the Solar Observatory has been run by Tycho Brahe Instituttet AS extending the educational activities to incorporate natural sciences as a whole.

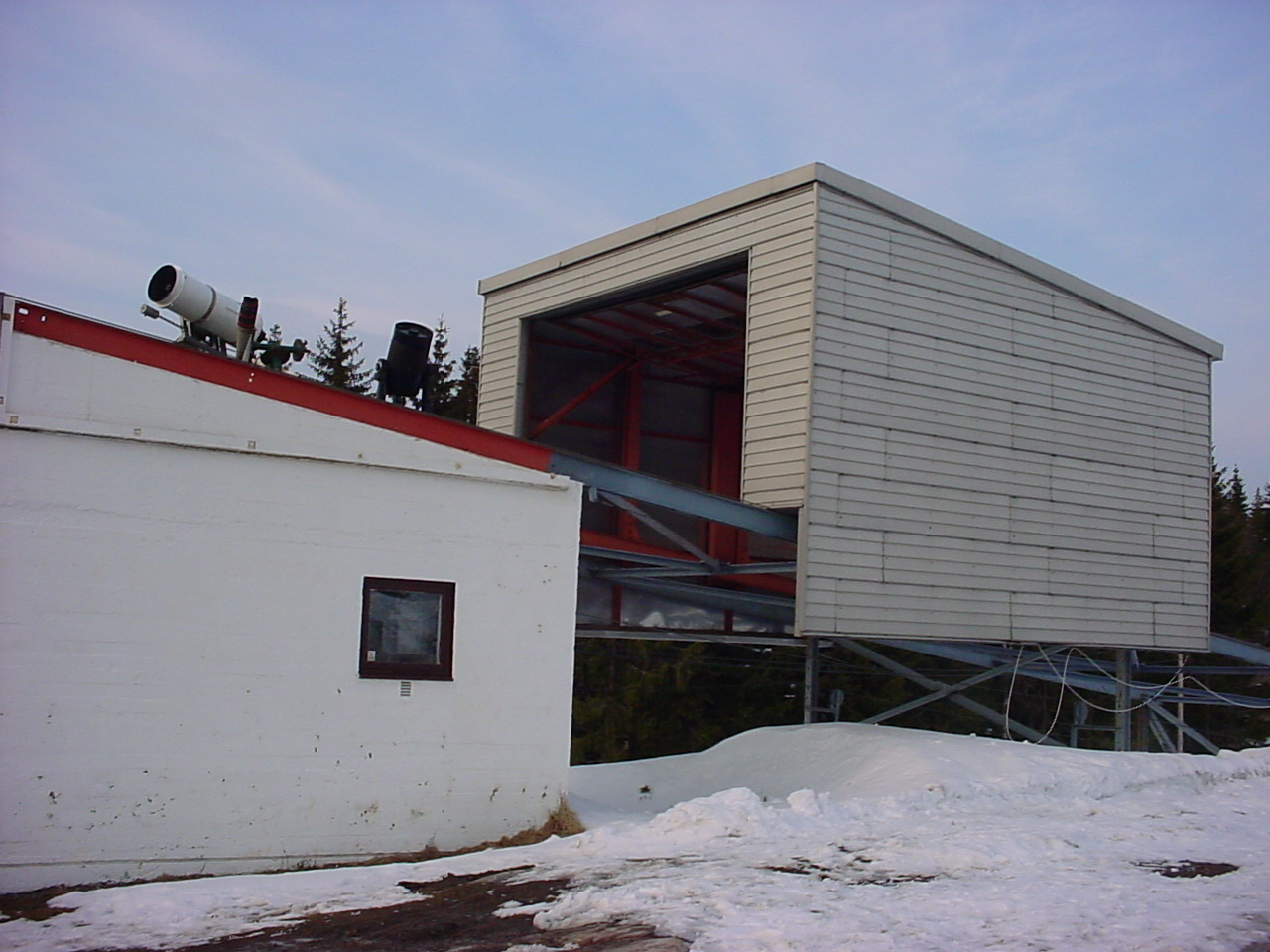
Lesser telescopes at the solar observatory at Harestua.
