= Avalsjøen =

Lake in Norway

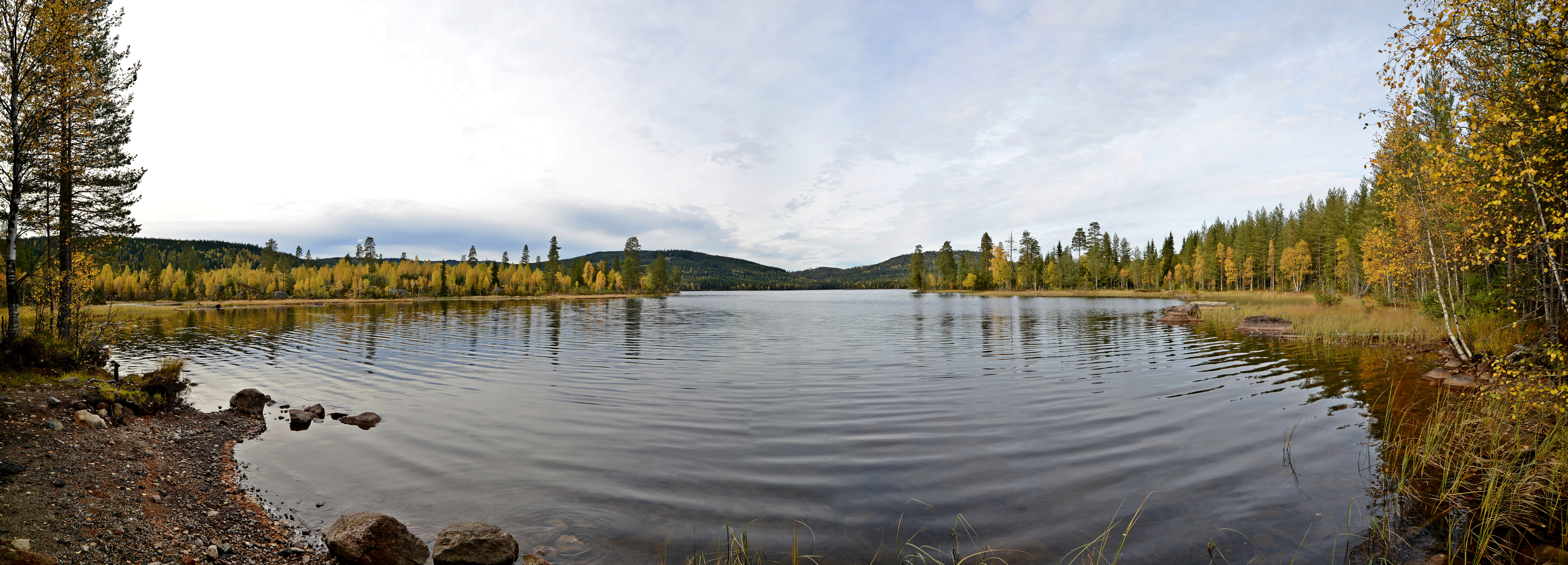

- Location within Akershus Location within Norway
- Location: Lunner (Akershus)
- Coordinates: 60°17′21″N 10°45′53″E
- Basin countries: Norway
- Surface area: 0.90 km^{2} (0.35 sq mi)
- Shore length^{1}: 7.85 km (4.88 mi)
- Surface elevation: 346 m (1,135 ft)
- References: NVE
- ^{1} Shore length is not a well-defined measure.

Avalsjøen is a lake in the municipality of Lunner in Akershus county, Norway.

== See also ==
- List of lakes in Norway
