= Hakadal =

Coordinates: 60°06′N 10°52′E

Hakadal Nittedal
- Village
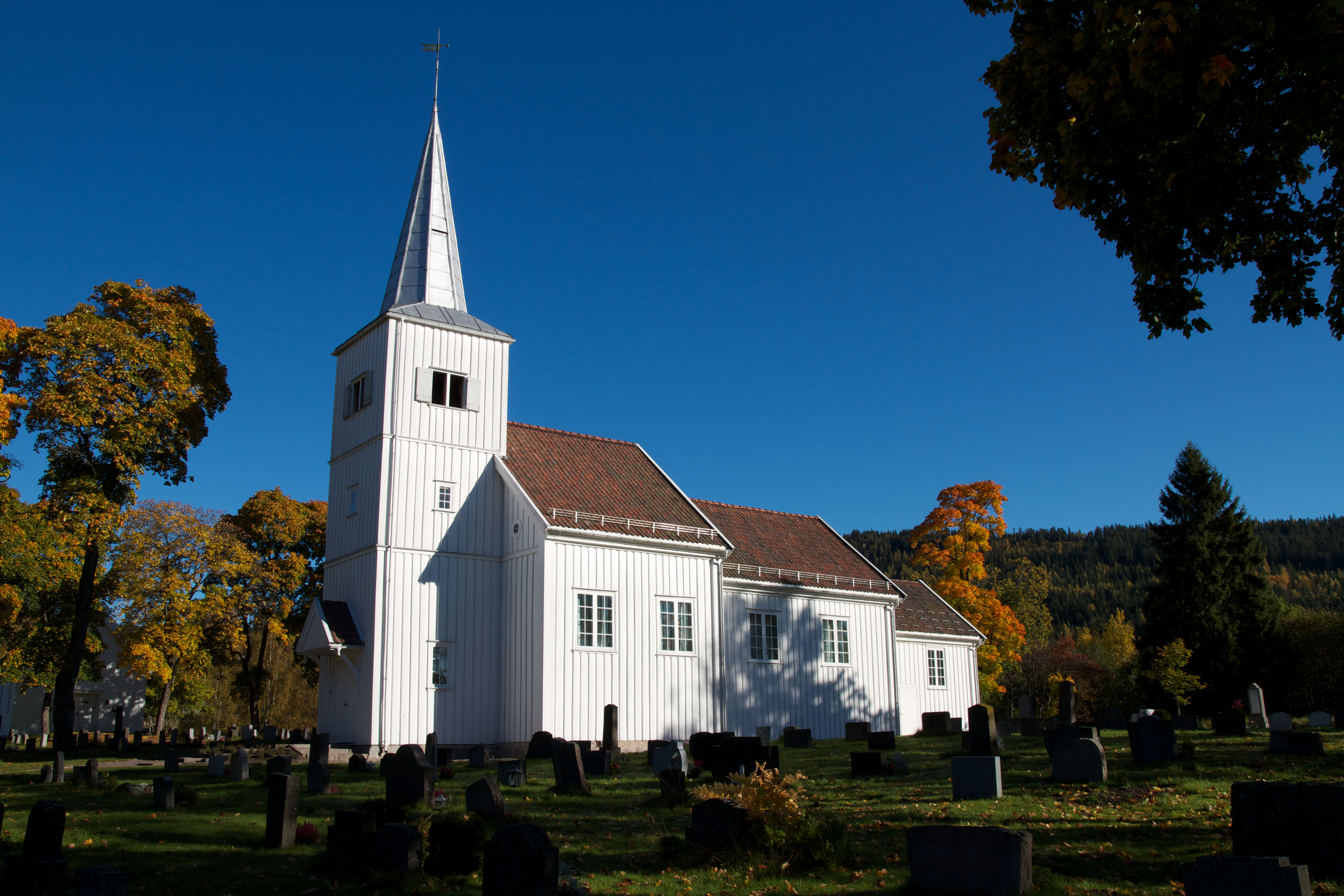
- Hakadal Church

- Location in Akershus
- Country: Norway
- Region: Østlandet
- County: Akershus
- Municipality: Nittedal
- Time zone: UTC+01:00 (CET)
  - Summer (DST): UTC+02:00 (CEST)

Hakadal is a village in the northern part of Nittedal municipality in Akershus, Norway.

The village and parish is the site of Hakadal Church (Hakadal Kirke). Hakadal Church dates to around 1610 and was originally constructed in a rectangular shape of timber. The church was restored in 1684, 1732, 1849 and 1890. In 1732, church was extended to the west. In 1849, the church's expansions included the addition of a church tower. The church has two church bells; one dating to 1839. The altarpiece was carved by Johan Jørgen Schramn in 1732.

The parish was also the site of the Hakadals verk iron works which dated from around 1550. Ore originally came from mines in Hakadal and Gjerdrum. After these sources were exhausted in the early 1800s, ore from Bærum and Dikemark. There was also ore from Nes Jernverk. The ironworks was shut down in 1869.

Hakadal Station (Hakadal stasjon) is located on the Gjøvik Line (Gjøvikbanen). The station was opened in 1900 prior to the opening of the Gjøvik Line in 1902. In 1971, the station became fully automatized and remote controlled.

== See also ==
- Varingskollen
