= Rotnes =

- Village
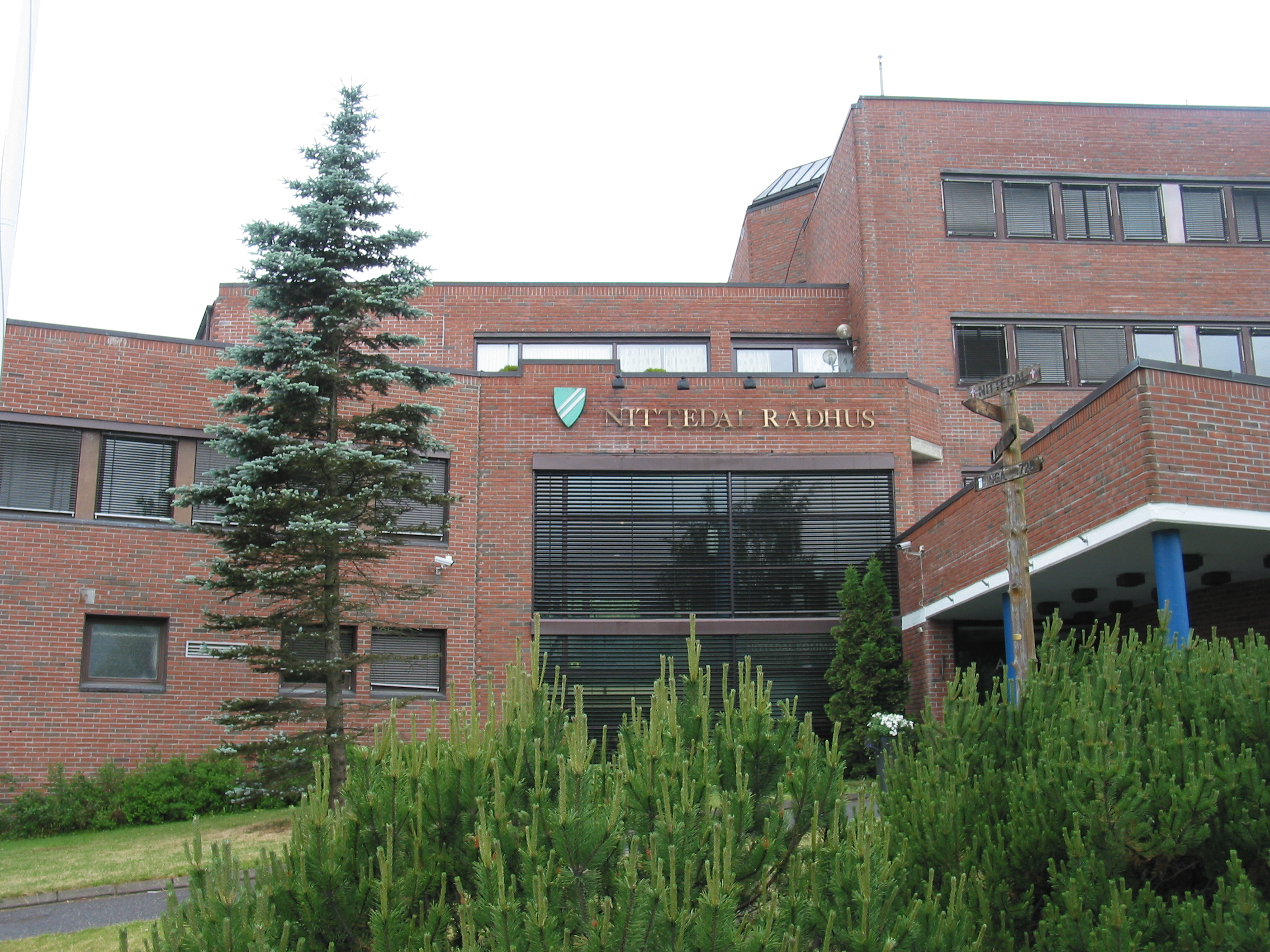
- Nittedal town hall.

- Location in Akershus
- Coordinates: 60°03′N 10°53′E
- Country: Norway
- Region: Østlandet
- County: Akershus
- Municipality: Nittedal
- Time zone: UTC+01:00 (CET)
  - Summer (DST): UTC+02:00 (CEST)

Rotnes is the administrative centre of Nittedal municipality, Norway. Its population (2010) is 20 939. It is located by the Norwegian National Road 4.
