= Åneby =

- Village
- Location in Akershus
- Coordinates: 60°05′N 10°52′E
- Country: Norway
- Region: Østlandet
- County: Akershus
- Municipality: Nittedal
- Time zone: UTC+01:00 (CET)
  - Summer (DST): UTC+02:00 (CEST)

Åneby is a village in the municipality of Nittedal, Norway. Its population in 2006 was 1,356.
