= Harestua =

Settlement in Lunner Municipality, Norway

Coordinates: 60°12′8″N 10°42′51″E

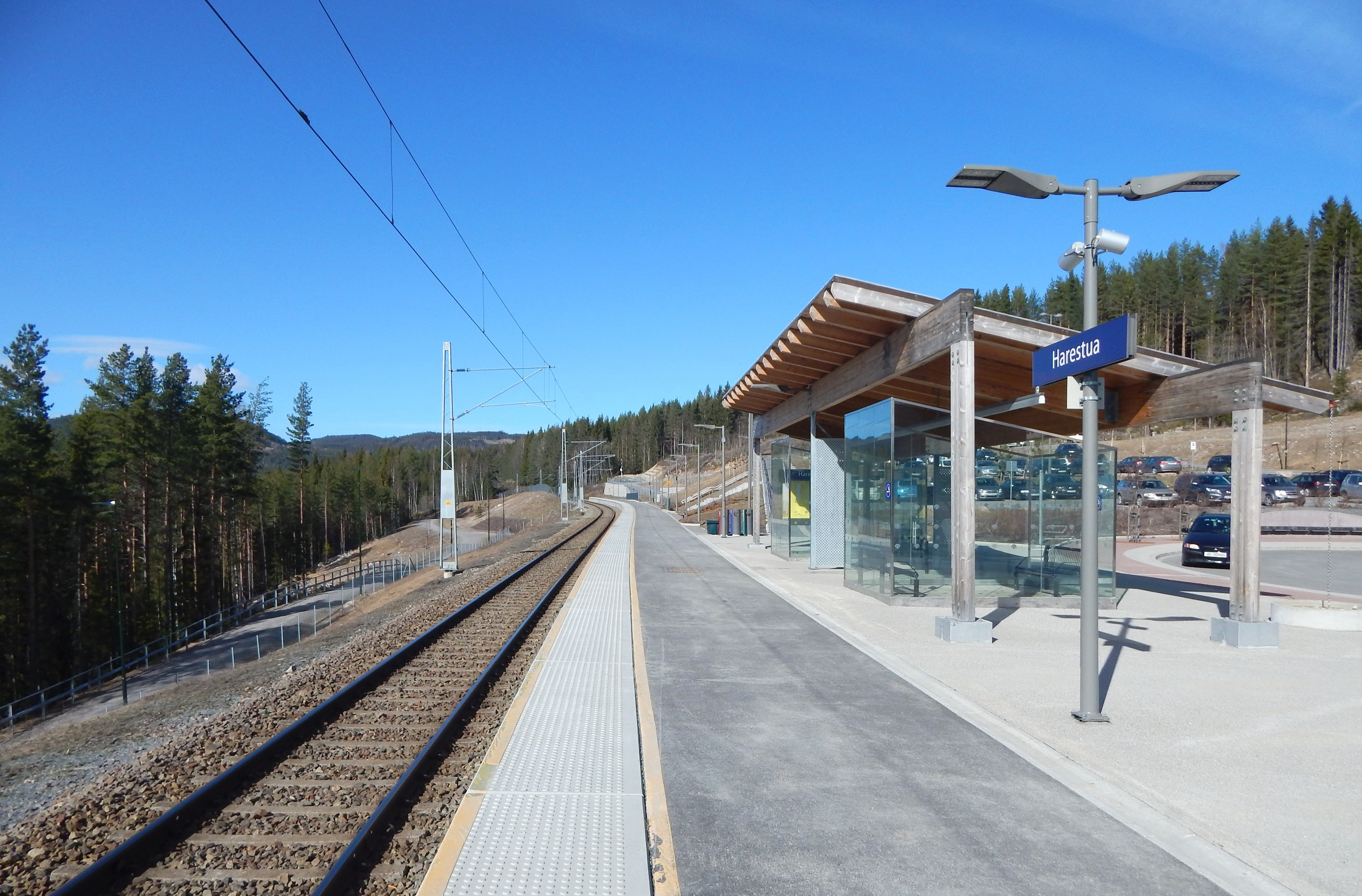
Harestua Station

Harestua is a town in Lunner kommune, Akershus county, Norway. It has 2,318 inhabitants. Harestua is located 46 kilometeres north of Oslo, and functions as a commuter town for the capital. It is served by Harestua Station on the Gjøvik Line.

Harestua maintains 6 neighbourhoods; Gamlefeltet, Nyfeltet, Vestbygda, Bjørgeseter, Haneknemoen, Haganskogen and Stryken. Harestua has a small town centre with services such as a petrol station, grocery stores and fast food outlets.

== History ==
During the 1940 German invasion of Norway, Harestua was the location of several skirmishes between German and Norwegian forces.

== Education ==
Harestua also has a combined elementary-junior high school. The school has approximately 400 pupils.

== Buildings ==
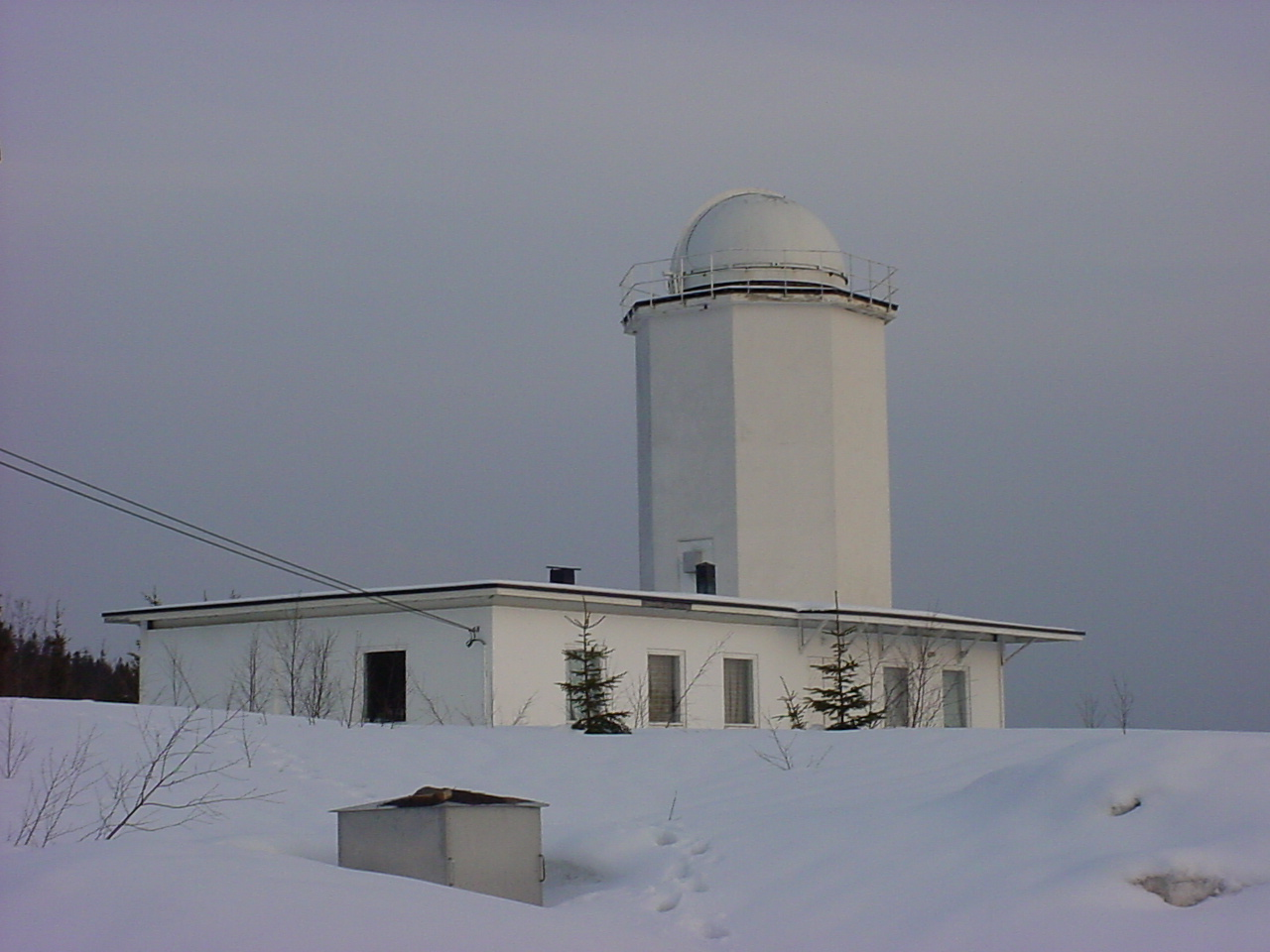
The Harestua Solar Observatory

The Harestua Solar Observatory is located nearby.

== Sport ==
The Lunner Motorsport on Hadelandsvegen 11, to the south of the town, is a prominent motor sport venue. It includes a motorcycle speedway track that held the final of the Norwegian Individual Speedway Championship in 1998, 2000, 2009, 2018 and 2020.
