= Grua =

Village in Lunner Municipality, Norway

Coordinates: 60°16′N 10°40′E

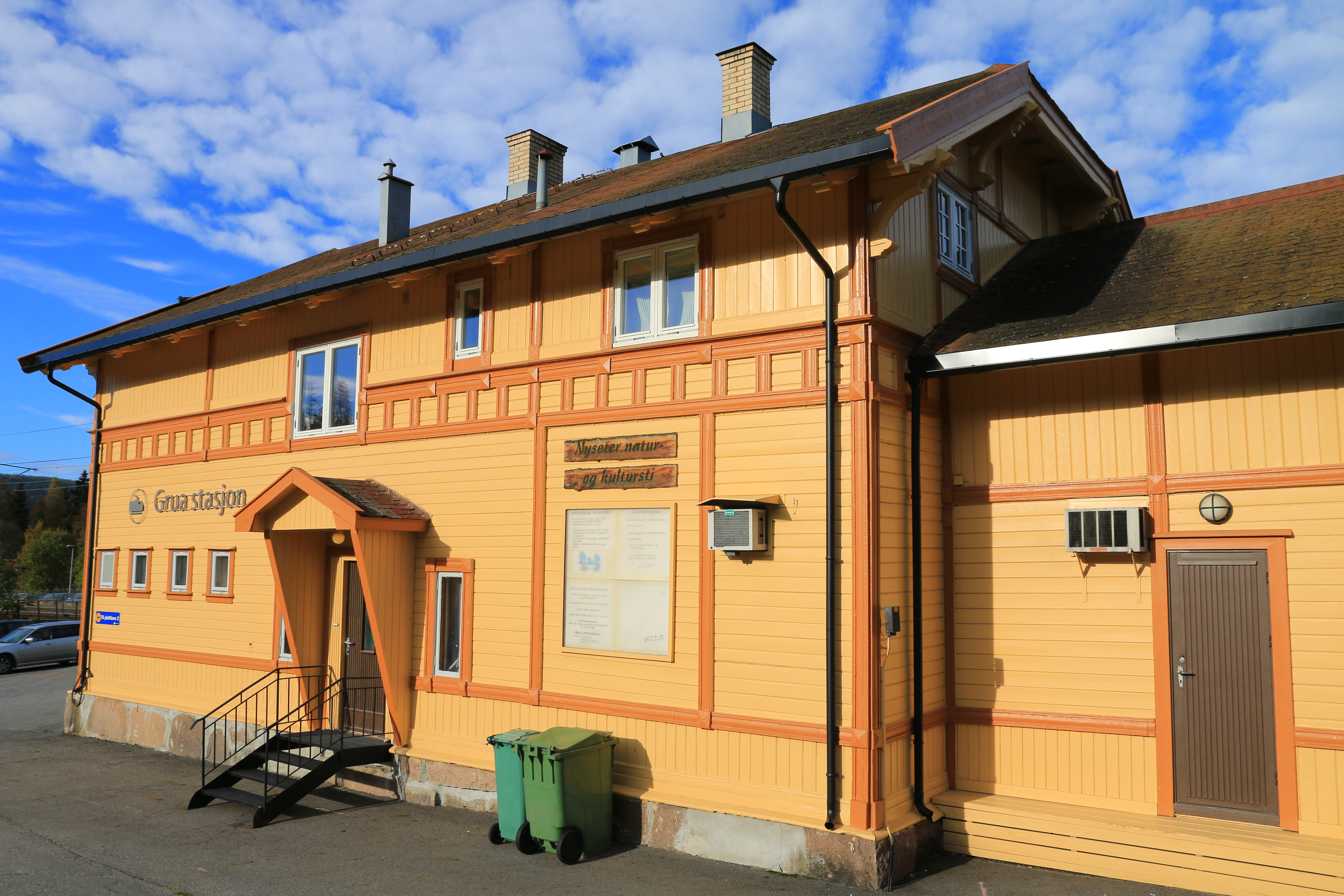
Grua Train Station

Grua is a village in the municipality of Lunner municipality, Akershus, Norway. Its population (2023) is 1,587. Mining is historically important, and Norway's oldest registered iron mine (from 1538) is located here.
