= Gjøvik Station =

Railway station in Gjøvik, Norway

Gjøvik
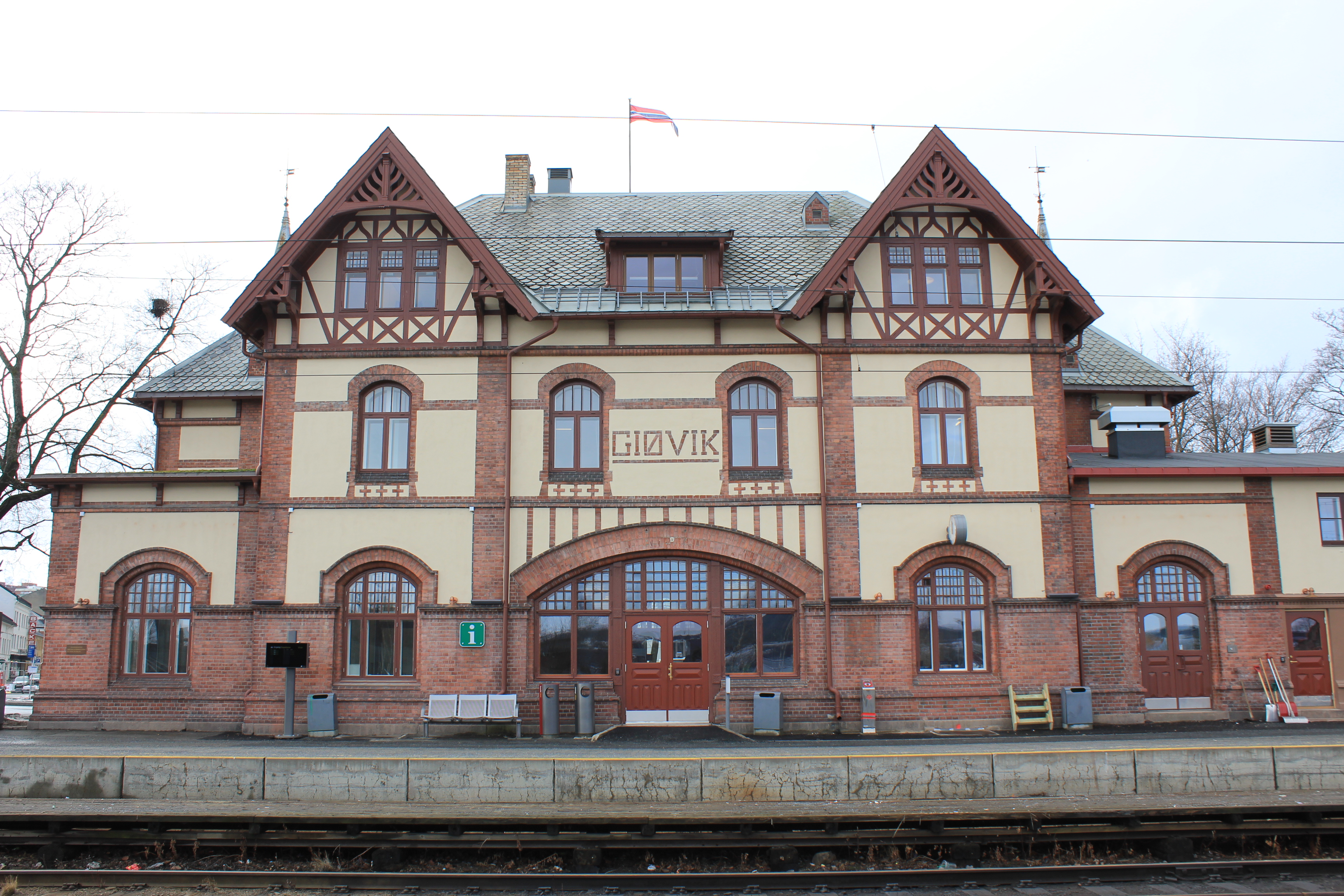

General information
- Location: Gjøvik; Norway
- Coordinates: 60.797154°N 10.694246°E
- Elevation: 129.2 m (424 ft)
- Owner: Bane NOR
- Operator: Vy Gjøvikbanen
- Line: Gjøvik Line
- Distance: 123.83 km (76.94 mi)
- Platforms: 1
- Connections: Bus: Innlandstrafikk

Construction
- Architect: Paul Armin Due

Other information
- Station code: GJØ

History
- Opened: 28 November 1902
Location

Gjøvik Station (Norwegian: Gjøvik stasjon) is a railway station located in downtown Gjøvik in Oppland Norway. The station is the terminus of the Gjøvik Line. It is located 123.83 km from Oslo Central Station and at 129.2 meters above sea level. Gjøvik is served by regional trains by Vy Gjøvikbanen, a subsidiary of Vy.

== History ==
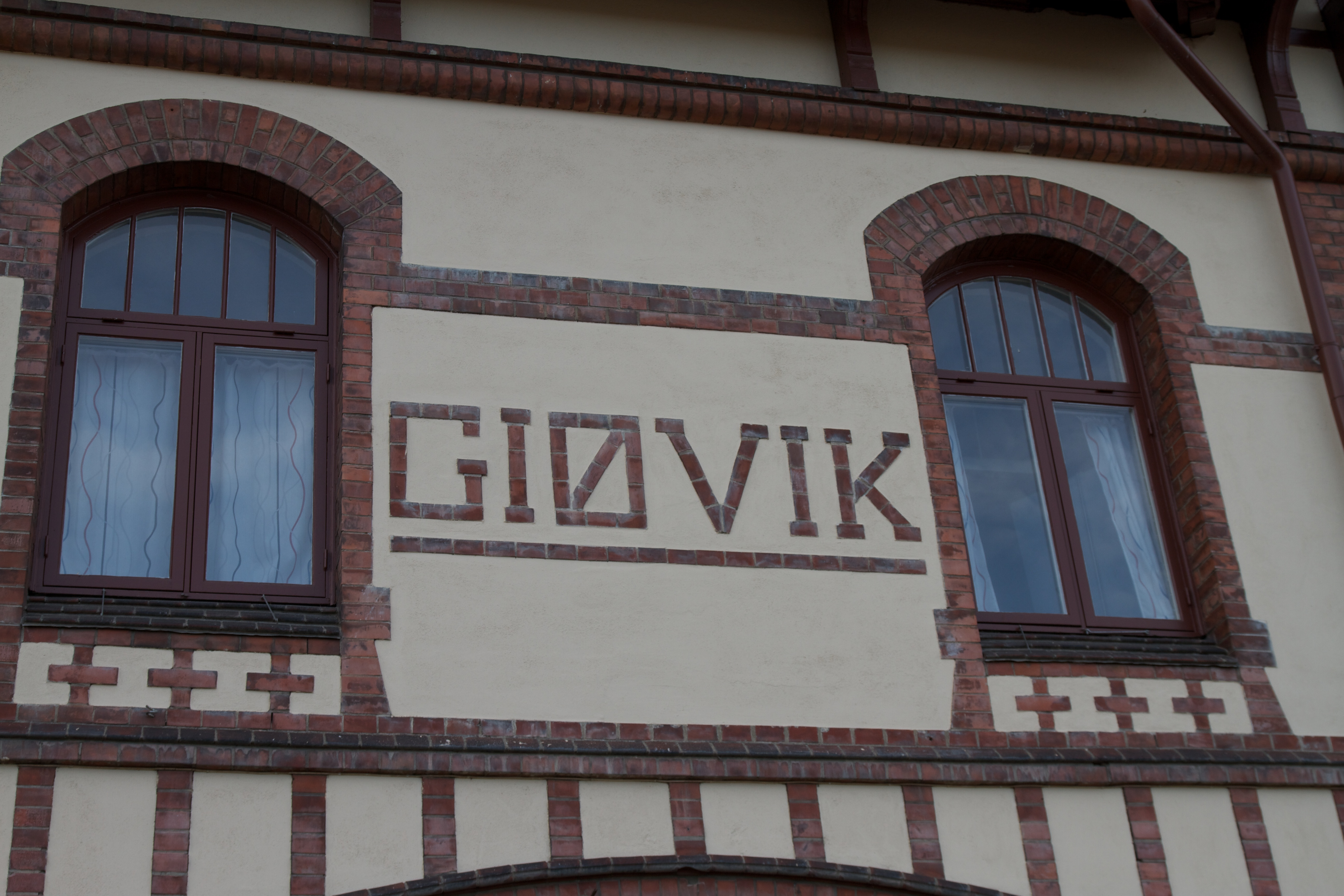
Gjøvik railway sign

The station was opened 28 November 1902. The station building was designed by the railroad architect Paul Armin Due. It was built in a tiled brick. It was expanded in 1937 and 1952. The building was extended heritage protection by Riksantikvaren in 2002. The station building currently houses the tourist information center for Gjøvik.

| Preceding station | | | Following station |
|---|---|---|---|
| Raufoss | Gjøvik Line | | — |
| Preceding station | Regional trains | | Following station |
| Raufoss | RE30 | Oslo S–Gjøvik | — |
