= Lunner =

Lunner Municipality Lunner kommune
- Municipality
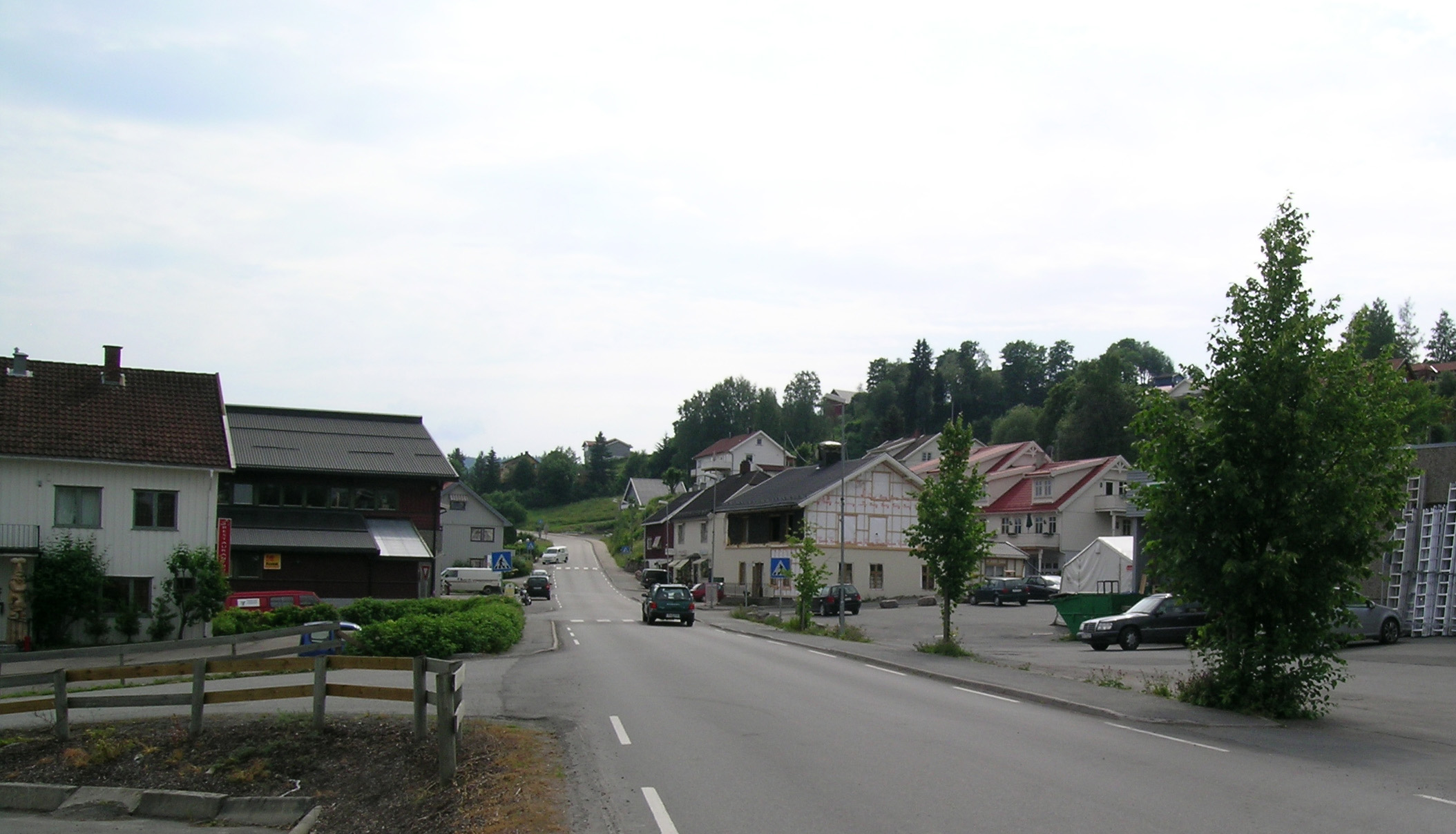

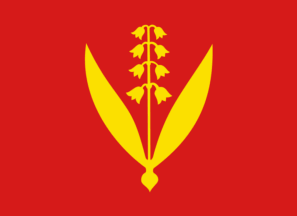
- Flag Coat of arms

- Akershus within Norway

- Lunner within Akershus
- Coordinates: 60°15′10″N 10°40′2″E
- Country: Norway
- County: Akershus
- District: Hadeland
- Administrative centre: Roa

Government
  - Mayor (2015): Harald Tyrdal

Area
  - Total: 292 km^{2} (113 sq mi)
  - Land: 272 km^{2} (105 sq mi)
  - Rank: #281 in Norway

Population (2015)
  - Total: 9,003
  - Rank: #121 in Norway
  - Density: 31/km^{2} (80/sq mi)
  - Change (10 years): ▲ +4.6%
- Demonym(s): Lynnersokning; Lynbying; Lunbying

Official language
  - Norwegian form: Bokmål
- Time zone: UTC+01:00 (CET)
  - Summer (DST): UTC+02:00 (CEST)
- ISO 3166 code: NO-3234
- Website: Official website

Lunner is a municipality in Akershus county, Norway. It is part of the traditional region of Hadeland. The administrative centre of the municipality is the village of Roa. Lunner was established when it was separated from Jevnaker Municipality on 1 January 1898. From 1 January 2020 the municipality belonged to Viken county and afterwards it was handed over to its successor Akershus. It was in Oppland before that.

== General information ==
=== Name ===
The municipality (originally the parish) is named after the old Lunner farm (Old Norse: Lunnar), since the first church was built here. The name is the plural form of lunnr "log". (The farm and the church are located on a long hill which was probably compared to a log.)

=== Coat-of-arms ===
The coat-of-arms is from modern times. They were granted on 4 April 1986. The arms show a Lily of the Valley, as a symbol for the forests in the area. The Lily of the Valley is a very common flower in the meadows and forests. The flowers also symbolize the eight schools in the municipality.

Number of minorities (1st and 2nd generation) in Lunner by country of origin in 2017
Ancestry	Number
Eritrea	148
Lithuania	136
Somalia	56
Poland	47
Sweden	47
Thailand	46
Denmark	34
Chile	34

== Geography ==
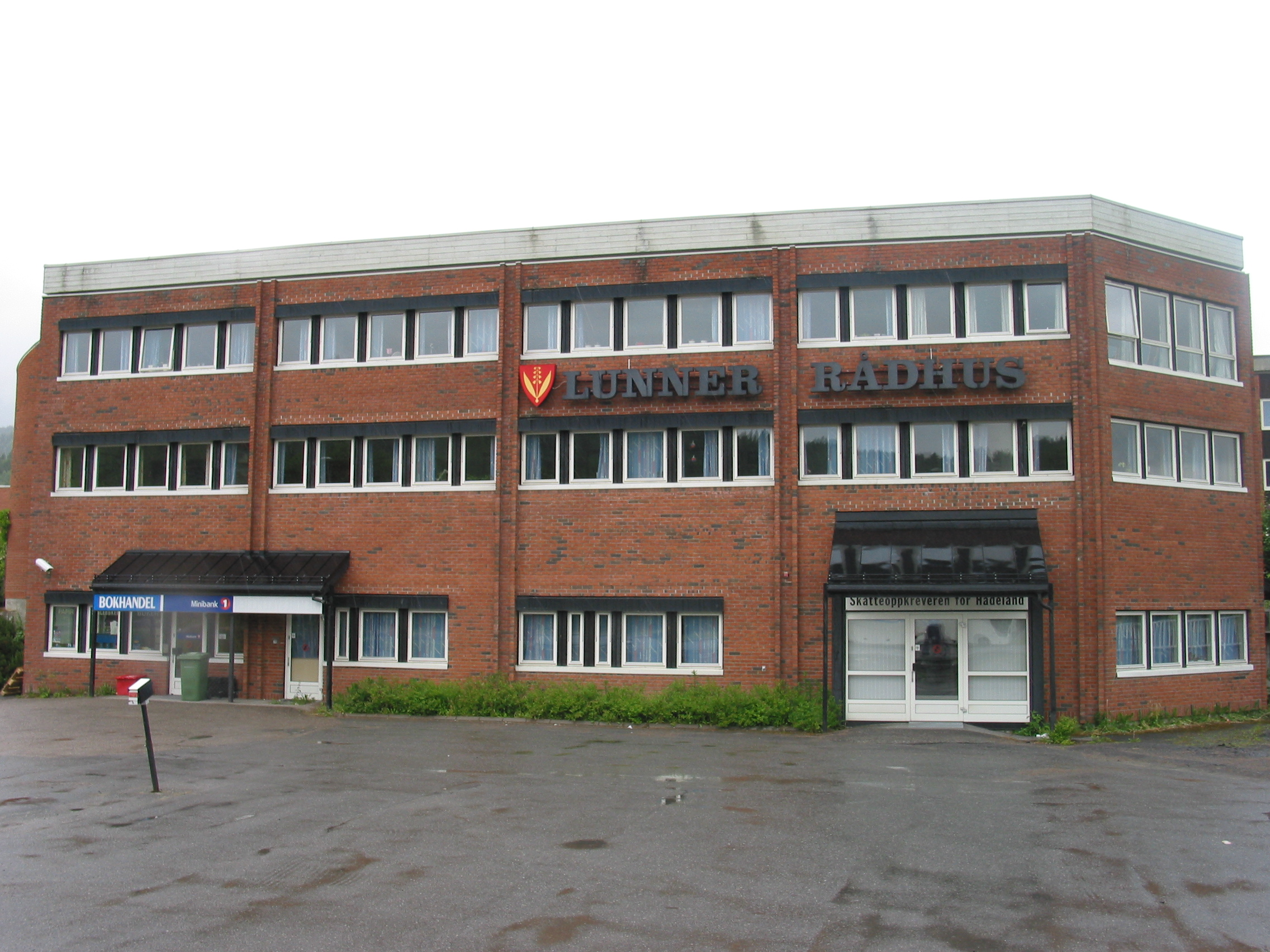
Lunner town hall

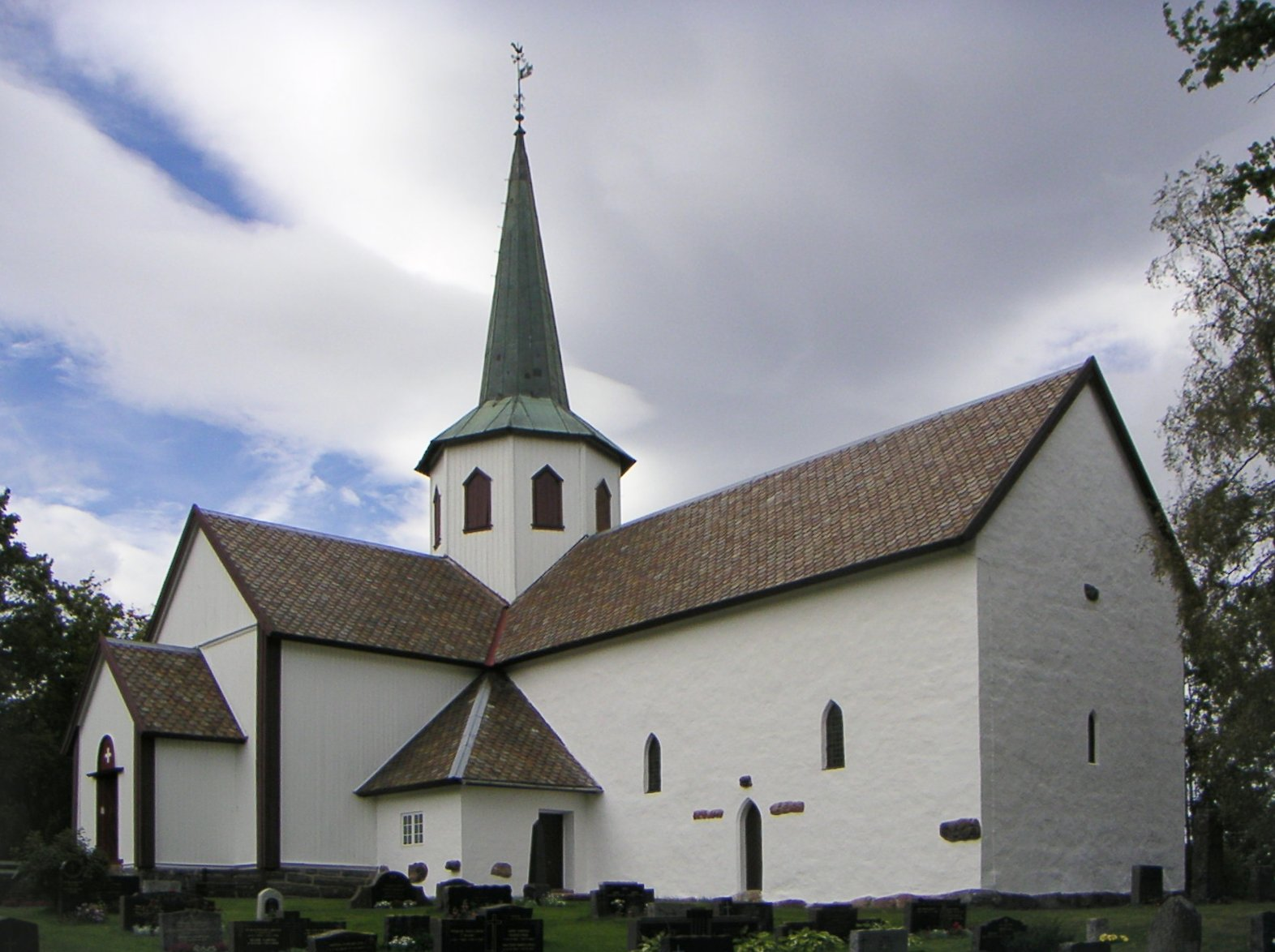
Lunner church

Lunner is bordered to the north by Gran Municipality, to the east by Nannestad Municipality, to the south by Nittedal Municipality and Oslo Municipality, and to the west by Jevnaker Municipality. There are several population centers in the municipality. Amongst these are: Harestua, Grua, Roa, and the village of Lunner.

Lunner is 23 kilometres (14 mi) on a north–south axis (23.1 km with water included) and 16.2 kilometres (10.1 mi) on an east–west axis. It lies at the southern end of Oppland county. The highest point is the Bislingflaka with a height of 691 metres (2,267 ft). Lakes in the region include Avalsjøen.

== Transportation ==
The Gjøvikbane and Bergensbane railway lines pass through the municipality.

== Attractions ==
- Lunner church
- Hadeland Mining Museum at Grua
- Harestua Solar Observatory, near Piperen
- Kloppstock Music Festival used to be held every summer at Harestua

== Notable residents ==
- Trond Halvorsen Wirstad (1904 in Lunner – 1985) politician, Mayor of Lunner, 1947–1951
- Ivar Ballangrud (1904 in Lunner - 1969), a speed skater, triple gold medalist at the 1936 Winter Olympics
- Josef Monsrud (1922 in Harestua – 2009) a forester and resistance member during WWII
- Jorun Askersrud Nygaard (1929 in Lunner – 2012) a cross-country skier and track and field athlete
- Knut Schreiner (born 1974) stage name "Euroboy" from the punk rock band Turbonegro, grew up in Harestua
- Ivar Rønningen (born 1975 in Lunner) a former footballer with over 200 club caps
- Steinar Strømnes (born 1987 in Roa) a footballer with over 300 club caps

== Sister cities ==
The following cities are twinned with Lunner:

- - Frederikssund, Region Hovedstaden, Denmark
- - Keila, Harju County, Estonia
- - Loppi, Etelä-Suomi, Finland
- - Vetlanda, Jönköping County, Sweden
