= Vy Gjøvikbanen =

Norwegian railway company, part of the Vy Group

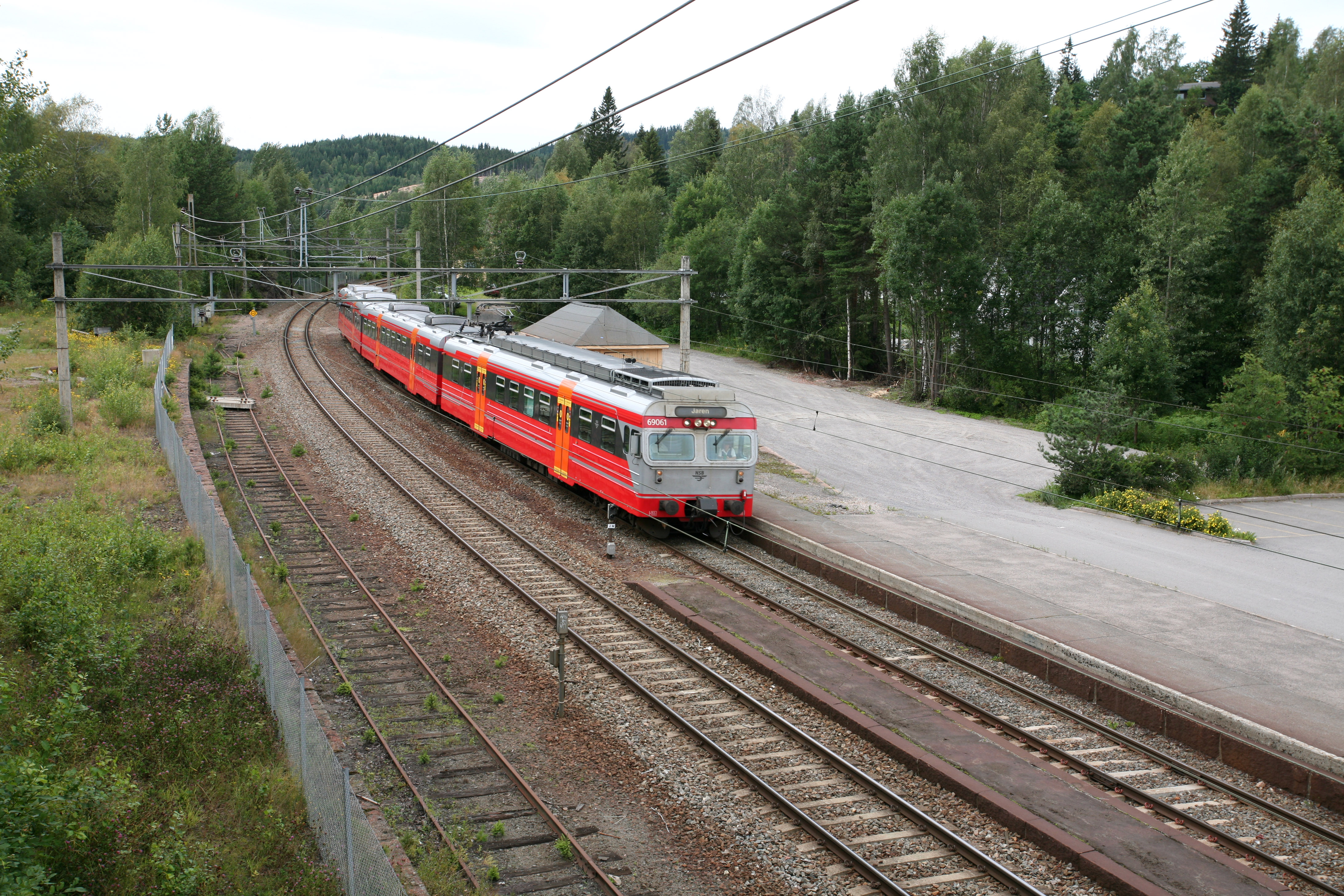
- Franchise: Gjøvik Line (2006–16)
- Main routes: Skøyen – Jaren; Oslo S – Gjøvik
- Fleet: 9 Class 69g
- Stations called at: 23
- Parent company: Vygruppen AS

Other
- Website: www.vy.no

Vy Gjøvikbanen AS (formerly NSB Gjøvikbanen AS) is a Norwegian railway company that operates the passenger train service on the Gjøvik Line. A subsidiary of the state-owned Vy, it operates a fleet of nine Class 69g three-car electric multiple units. NSB Gjøvikbanen provides two different services: the Skøyen – Oslo S – Jaren service is part of the Oslo Commuter Rail; while Oslo S – Gjøvik is a regional service, with only limited stops on the route until Grua. Departures are each 40 minutes, with every third train running to Gjøvik.

The company was created in 2004 as NSB Anbud AS to compete for the tender bid for a ten-year public service obligation (PSO) contract with the Norwegian Ministry of Transport and Communications on the Gjøvik Line. The company won the bid and operations started on 11 June 2005, with newly renovated trains. Following the September 2005 election, all further PSO offerings for railway operations were terminated, and the company was left with the single service, subsequently changing its name to reflect the single route.

== Operations ==
The company operates both regional trains to Gjøvik, as well as Line R31, the Regonial Commuter Rail, to Hakadal or Jaren. Most north-bound trains originate at Oslo Central Station (Oslo S), but some rush-hour services start at Skøyen, and operate through the Oslo Tunnel to Oslo S, to serve large working districts of Oslo. Vy Gjøvikbanen has a train leave and depart Oslo S every 40 minutes; however, the trains have three different stopping patterns and termini, giving each of the three services a two-hour headway. Two services are commuter trains, and stop at all stations. The one operates until Hakadal, while the other operates until Jaren. In addition, there is a regional services that operates to Gjøvik. The regional service only calls at the major stations until Grua, but serves all stations after that. Travel time from Oslo S to Hakadal is 40 minutes, to Jaren it is 1 hour 22 minutes, while it is 1 hour 55 minutes to Gjøvik. The Gjøvik Line accounts for six percent of passenger transport on the national rail network.

Vy Gjøvikbanen has a staff of five in administration, 36 engineers and 32 conductors. Their offices are located at Jaren Station and Oslo S. This results in the Gjøvik Line being served by the same pool of train drivers and conductors, unlike the other commuter train services around Oslo, who use stock and staff interchangeably. In 2007, the company had a revenue of 132 million kr, and a net profit of NOK 7 million.

=== Rolling stock ===
Vy Gjøvikbanen operates nine Class 69g three-car electric multiple unit. They were originally built by Strømmens Værksted in 1983 and 1984, and delivered as part of the D-series to Vy. They have since been operating as commuter trains. Prior to the PSO process, the trains were rebuilt by Danske Statsbaner in Denmark, and were completely renovated and refurbished, at the expense of the Ministry of Transport. The refurbishments included a new color design, where the deep red exterior was supplemented with details in silver and orange. The interior was also replaced, and consists of a silver scheme. Part of the end cars were converted into quiet zones, while another section is a comfort zone (first class), which has a NOK 90 price supplement. Beverages are available from vending machines. The trains were also fitted with two wheelchair lifts and a wheelchair accessible toilet.

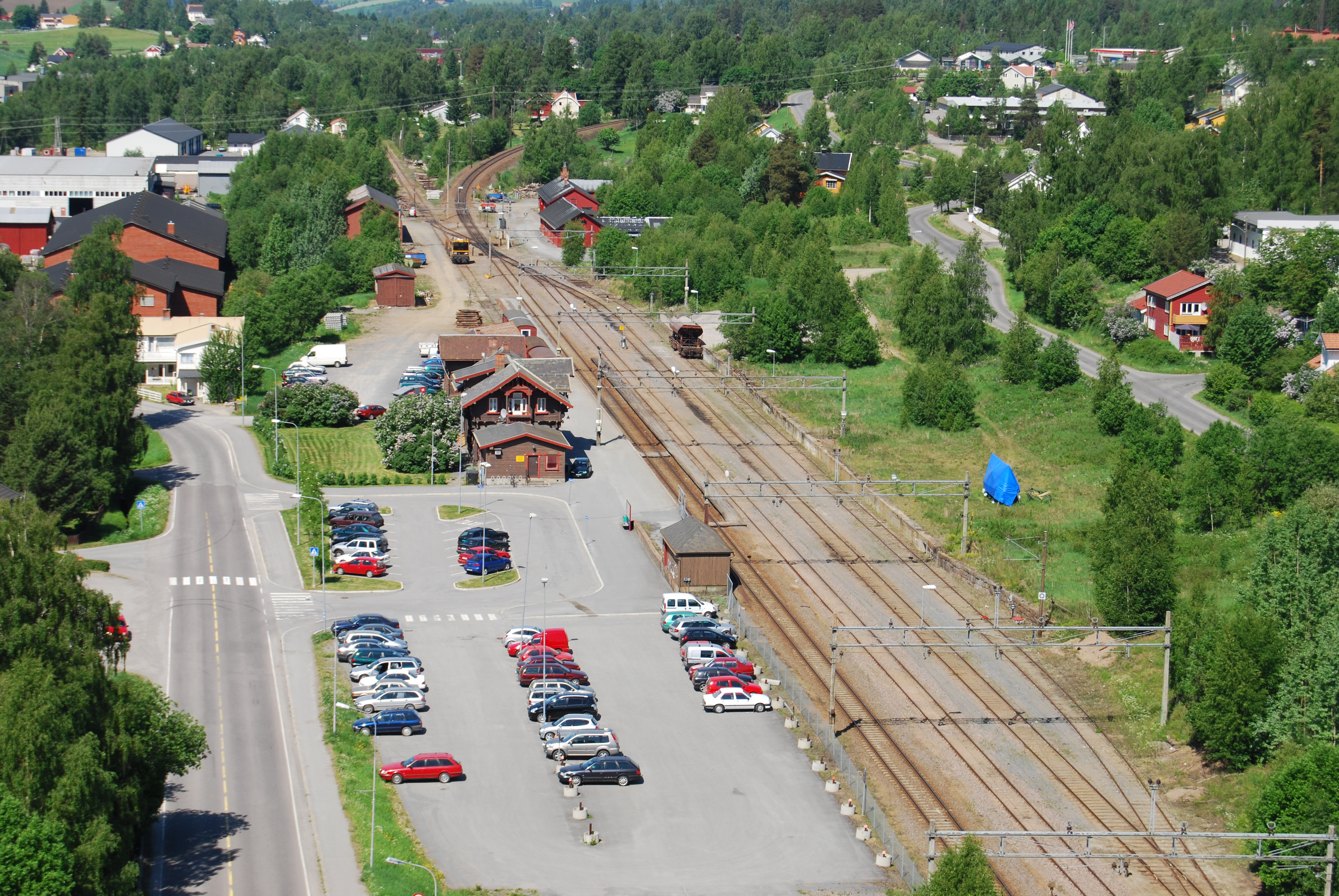
Every third train terminates at Jaren Station

The trains have a capacity for 270 passengers. Each car has a Bo'Bo' wheel arrangement, and the train has a power output of 1,188 kW (1,593 hp). Maximum permitted speed is 130 km/h (81 mph), though there are few places along the Gjøvik Line that allow such high speeds. Due to restriction on the catenary north of Roa, only one train can be on the northern section at any given time.

=== Route ===
The Gjøvik Line (Norwegian: Gjøvikbanen) is a 123-kilometre (76 mi) railway line between Oslo Central Station and Gjøvik Station. Originally named the North Line, the first section from Grefsen to Røykenvik opened on 20 December 1900. On 28 November 1902, the section from Grefsen to Oslo S and from Jaren to Gjøvik opened. The section from Jaren to Røykenvik then became the branch Røykenvik Line. The line was electrified at 15 kV 16.7 Hz AC north to Jaren in 1961, and to Gjøvik two years later. At the same time, the section from Oslo S to Grefsen was rebuilt to double track. The rest of the line remains single track. There are 21 stations on the line, all served by NSB Gjøvikbanen. The southern part of the line, from Oslo to Roa, is also used by freight trains, who branch off on the Roa–Hønefoss Line to connect to the Bergen Line.

== History ==
=== Background ===
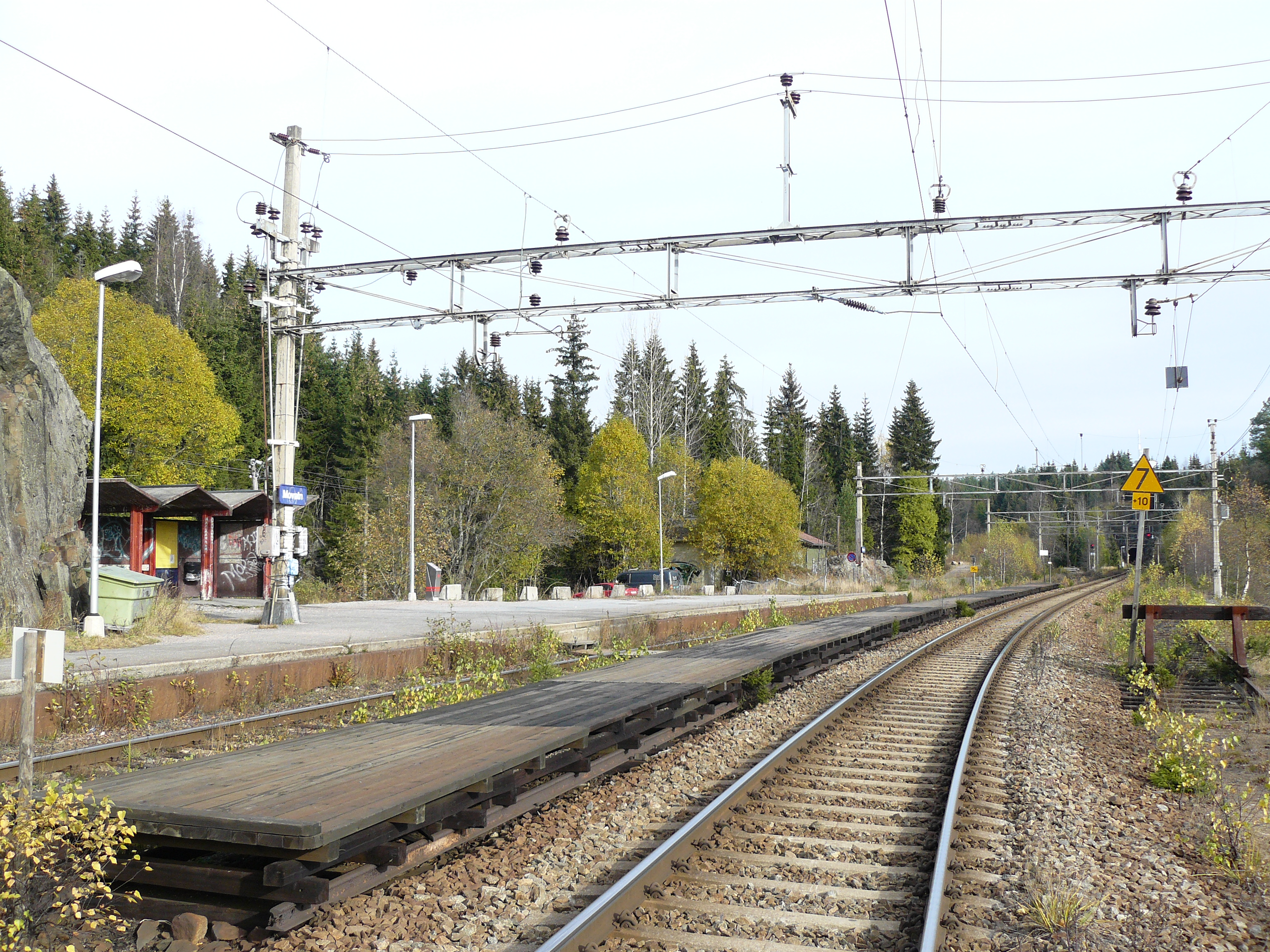
Movatn is the northernmost station within the limits of Oslo

Following the right-winged Second cabinet Bondevik victory in the 2001 parliamentary election, Minister of Transport, Torild Skogsholm from the Liberal Party announced that the government would make all subsidized passenger trains services in the country subject to public service obligation (PSO). This had previously been done in several other European countries, such as Sweden and Germany. The initial plans launched in 2002 called for three routes to be subject to PSO: the Gjøvik Line, the Bratsberg Line and the Bergen Commuter Rail. These are the commuter train services least passengers, and the purpose was to use the initial tenders as a "learning exercise" and to create a more efficient system to implement in future tenders. The plans also called for transferring the responsibility for managing and financing the PSO contracts on commuter rail services to the counties, but this was not followed, in part because of a report from the Institute of Transport Economics, which concluded that this would provide a worse service.

At the time, the government was spending NOK 1.4 billion annually on purchasing passenger transport from NSB. By introducing PSO, Skogsholm stated that she hoped the costs would be reduced, and that quality and safety levels would remain, or even improve. The counties have been allowed to issue PSO contracts on bus transport since 1994; and Skogsholm saw the competition in rail transport as a continuation of this. Following the announcement of the competition, CEO of NSB, Einar Enger, said that he did not see competition as a threat, but instead that NSB would introduce means to rationalize costs. In November 2002, NSB laid off 100 employees, and reduced its administration by a third. The administration of all local and regional trains was reallocated to Oslo. Skogsholm stated that the government had no plans to sell NSB.

=== Bid process ===
In 2003, Telemark County Municipality had attempted to create a PSO contract for the operation of the Bratsberg Line, that had been transferred from the state to the county. Five private companies had bid, but all five had been disqualified and the county was forced to sign a concession contract with NSB instead, despite NSB not having bid in the tender. The same year, the national process was delayed one year. However, the government announced that the bidding would happen in three stages; first the Gjøvik Line and Bergen Commuter Rail, second the long-distance trains as well as the Trøndelag Commuter Rail, and finally the rest of the Oslo Commuter Rail, as well as the Jæren Commuter Rail. Among the challenges was the ownership of the rolling stock and depots. The department considered creating a separate government-owned company that would own these. Since NSB had been converted to a limited company, it would be necessary for the state to purchase the trains and depots for full price from NSB. With 69 multiple units delivered within the past five years, this could become an expensive transaction for the state. An alternative was launched were NSB would have to lease locomotives, carriages and multiple units to the winner, and also sell tickets for them at railway stations, a solution that was later chosen. In September 2004, it was announced that current employees working for NSB along the Gjøvik Line would have the right to work for the winner, and could demand the same wage and pension rights as before.

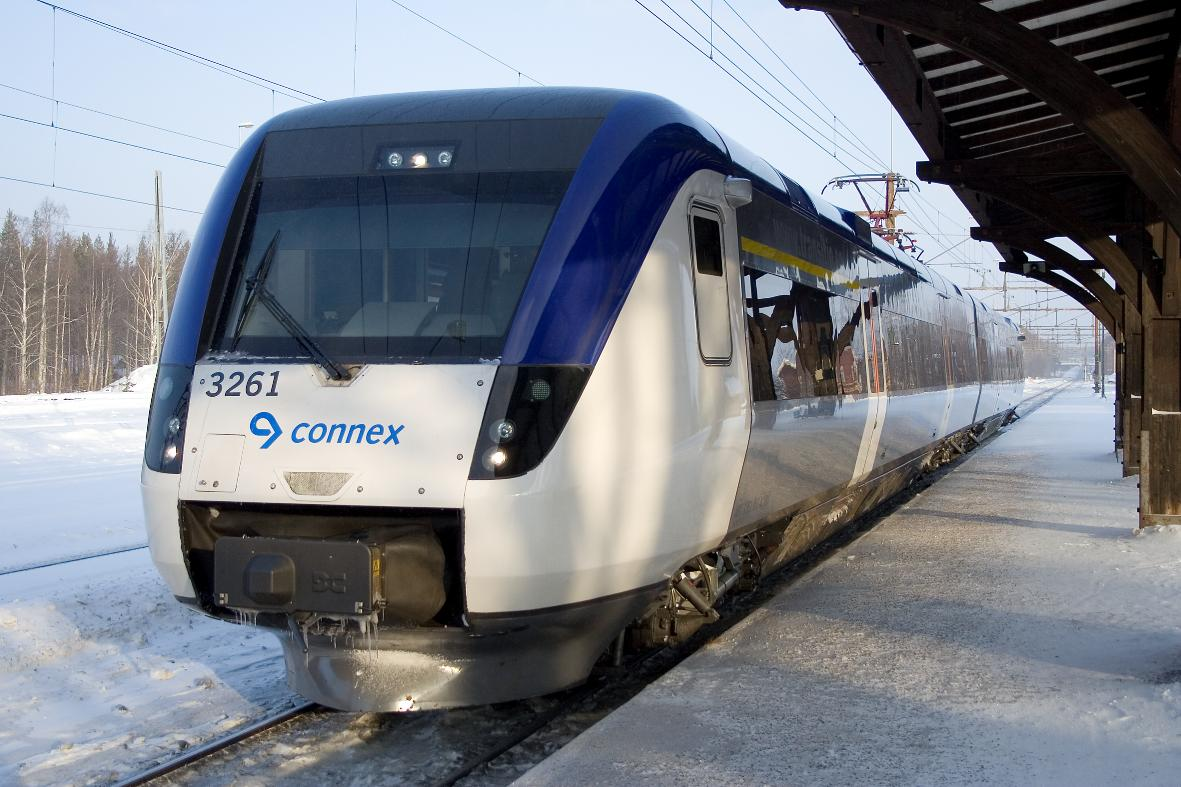
While Veolia has been successful at winning PSO contracts in Sweden, they failed to offer the lowest bid for operating the Gjøvik Line.

The Gjøvik Line was chosen as the first service to be subject to PSO. The deadline for applying for prequalification was on 1 April 2004, and seven companies applied. These were Norges Statsbaner, Ofotbanen, Arriva, Veolia, Danske Statsbaner (DSB) and Keolis. The companies were required to document their competency to be qualified for security and operation permits from the Norwegian Railway Inspectorate; and were not allowed to subsidize the operations from activities that were not subject to competition. To participate in the bid, NSB established the subsidiary NSB Anbud AS in 2004.

By the time the tenders were submitted, it turned out only NSB, DSB and Veolia had chosen bid. The tender was won by NSB Anbud on 30 May 2005, wanting NOK 70 million annually for the contract, ten million less than with the former agreement. After the contract was won, NSB Anbud announced the schedule for the Gjøvik Line. The number of train services would increase by 40%. Three stations serving the recreational area Nordmarka outside Oslo would be dropped—Elnes, Stryken and Bjørgeseter. Skogsholm tried to make an agreement with NSB to not abandon all the stations, but since this had not been part of the PSO tender, an agreement could not be made and the service was canceled.

After the tender, 80 employees were transferred to the subsidiary, including the director, chartered engineer Arne Fosen. To the press he said that the increased efficiency in the organization was related to a small administration, and being able to use uniform trains. Previously both locomotive-hauled trains, as well as Class 70 and Class 69 trains had been used. Following the PSO, NSB Anbud would operate nine Class 69g trains, which are somewhat smaller than the locomotive-hauled and Class 70 trains. These would be owned by NSB, but rented by the subsidiary. The ministry would pay for a NOK 40 million overhaul of the stock. Representatives from the labor union said they feared for the flexibility of NSB, since 80 employees were now bound up in serving only a single line. Margareth Nordby replaced Fosen as director in August.

=== Operation ===
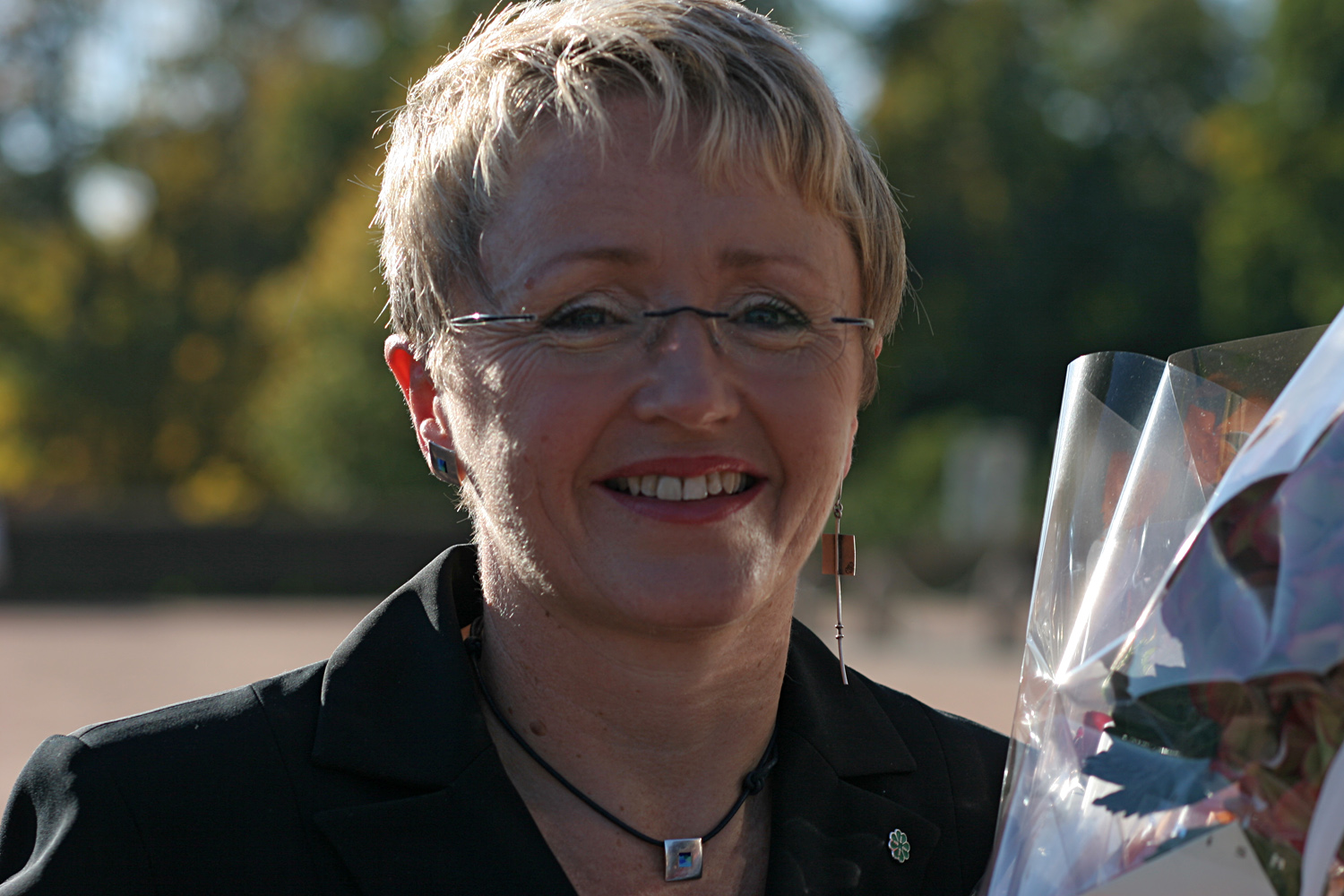
Minister of Transport Liv Signe Navarsete (Centre) cancelled the PSO process in 2005, following the Second cabinet Stoltenberg's election victory.

Service was introduced on 11 June 2006, with a contract lasting ten years. Along with the change of operator and stock, the Norwegian National Rail Administration, who owns the stations and tracks, did an overhaul of maintenance on many of the stations, in particular removing years of vandalism. In August, the company did a minor upgrade to the trains. The quiet sections were doubled from one to two sections, and new window shades for NOK 650,000 were purchased. By August, the ridership on the Gjøvik Line had increased by 8%, compared to the previous year.

In January 2007, all the trains were equipped with weapons so the drivers could kill animals hit by the trains. About 100 game are killed each year along the line. In September, NSB Anbud launched a service allowing passenger riding from the Gjøvik and Toten areas to transfer to a coach at Roa Station, and continue onwards to Oslo Airport, Gardermoen. Since the establishment, NSB Anbud has requested an additional passing loop on the Gjøvik Line. This will allow more freight trains on the line, and reduce travel time for the passenger trains by four minutes. The investment would cost NOK 50 to 70 million. During 2007, the company also accused the Norwegian National Rail Administration of giving the Gjøvik Line less priority in maintenance just because NSB Anbud had their train run more on time than trains operated by other companies.

=== Aftermath ===
The PSO project cost the ministry at least 25 million. Millions were needed for external consultant fees to prepare the contracts, in addition to the cost of upgrading the rolling stock. The exact fees paid were not disclosed to the public. Following the left-winged Stoltenberg's Second Cabinet's victory in the 2005 parliamentary election, the new Minister of Transport, Liv Signe Navarsete from the Centre Party, announced that there would be no more public tenders in the railway sector. The government stated that experience from Sweden and the United Kingdom showed that employees rights and safety was reduced after privatization was introduced.
