= Gjøvik Line =

Norwegian railway line between Oslo and Gjøvik

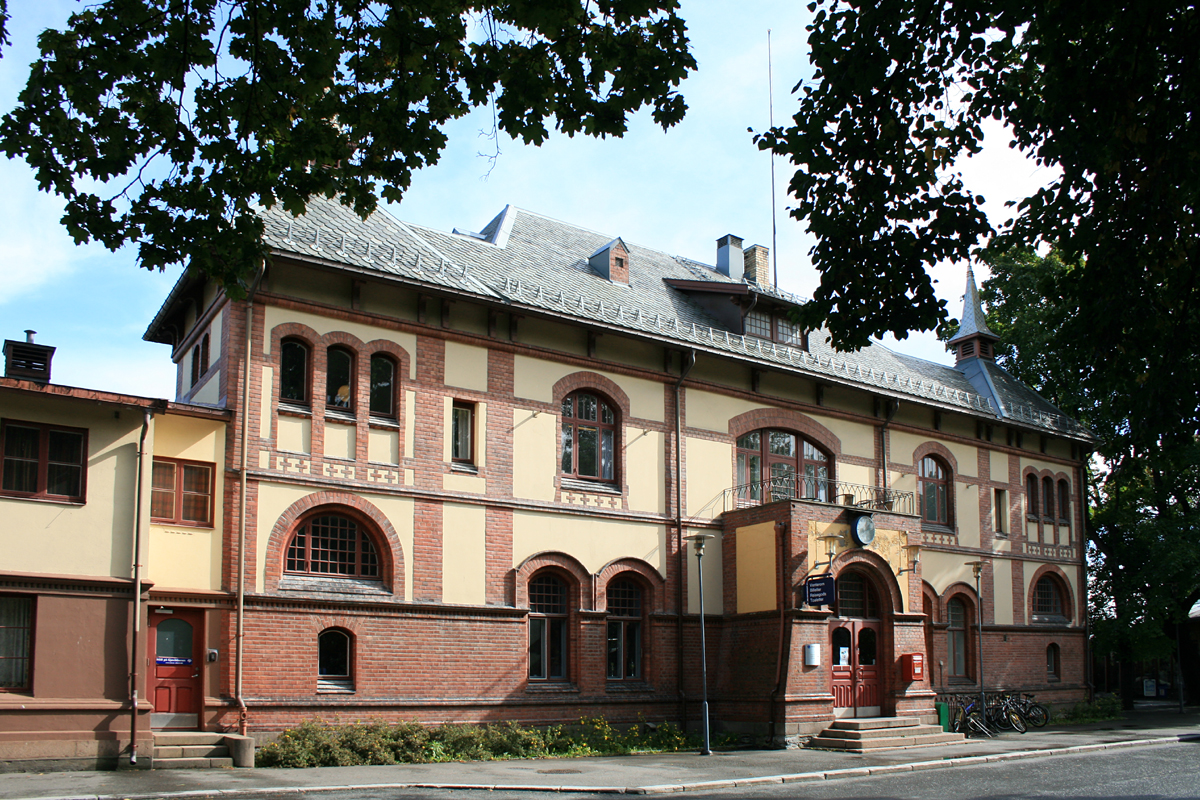
- Gjøvik Station

Overview
- Native name: Gjøvikbanen
- Owner: Bane NOR
- Termini: Oslo Central Station; Gjøvik Station
- Stations: 31

Service
- Type: Railway
- System: Norwegian railways
- Operator: Vy Gjøvikbanen
- Rolling stock: Class 75-2

History
- Opened: 1902

Technical
- Line length: 124 km
- Number of tracks: Single
- Character: Passenger trains
- Track gauge: 1,435 mm (4 ft 8 1/2 in)
- Electrification: 15 kV 16.7 Hz AC
- Operating speed: Max. 130 kilometres per hour (81 mph)

The Gjøvik Line (Norwegian: Gjøvikbanen) is a Norwegian railway line between Oslo and Gjøvik. It was originally named the North Line (Nordbanen) and ran between Grefsen and Røykenvik. The line was completed to Gjøvik in 1902. The Gjøvik Line was one of the first lines of the Norwegian railway system which was to be contracted on public service obligation, but it was the state owned Norges Statsbaner which won, operating it through its subsidiary Vy Gjøvikbanen.

== The line ==
The lines is the smallest and least trafficked railway line from Oslo, and the only single track line in the capital. Like most other Norwegian railway lines, the entire 124 km long line is electrified at 15 kV 16.7 Hz AC.

It serves some of the northern neighborhoods of Oslo, and has a few stations in the woods of Nordmarka. Further north the line serves the municipality of Nittedal. At Roa, the Roa–Hønefoss Line branches off to Hønefoss, where it continues as the Bergen Line. Formerly, most trains between Oslo and Bergen used this route, but nowadays most passenger trains run on the route through Drammen, which is slightly longer but which runs through more densely populated areas. Freight trains use the line over Roa, and sometimes passenger trains also use this line as a reserve line if the route from Hønefoss to Oslo via Drammen is temporarily closed. Further north, the Gjøvik Line runs through the district of Toten before ending at Gjøvik.

The Gjøvik Line formerly had three branch lines, the Røykenvik Line, the Valdres Line and the Skreia Line. All these lines are now closed.

Most of the service on the Gjøvik Line is provided by electric multiple units. The passenger routes are served by the newly (2006) redesigned Type 69D multiple units named Type 69G, rebuilt in Denmark by Danske Statsbaner (DSB).
