= Skipping Girl Sign =

Neon sign in Abbotsford, Melbourne, Australia

Coordinates: 37.8113°S 145.0108°E

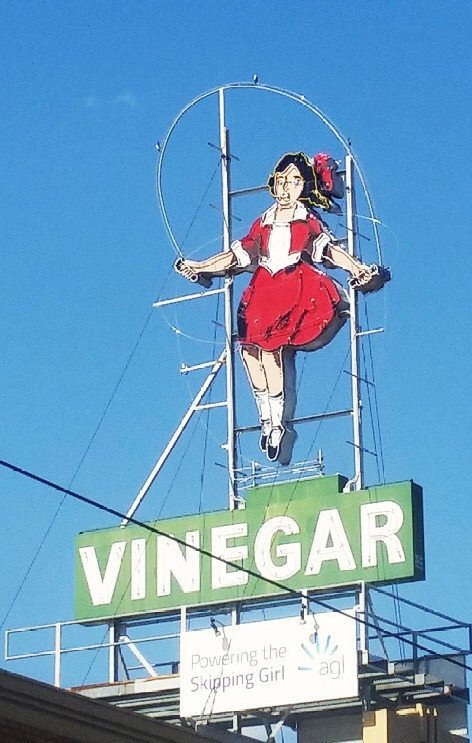
View of the Skipping Girl sign

The Skipping Girl Sign or Skipping Girl Vinegar Sign, colloquially known as Little Audrey is a historic animated neon sign in the inner Melbourne suburb of Abbotsford, and was possibly the first animated neon sign in Australia when first erected in 1936. It advertised the Skipping Girl Vinegar brand, and was placed on top of the factory at 627 Victoria Street, Abbotsford. Removed in 1968, a reproduction was placed on a nearby factory at 651 Victoria Street in 1970 following a public outcry. In April 2026, the Skipping Girl sign was temporarily switched off and a new neon Scrolling Girl sign, was switched on as part of a campaign to get kids active.

== Construction ==
The sign consists of a painted metal structure outlined in neon tubing depicting a little girl skipping rope. At night the sign's outlines are illuminated, the skipping rope being displayed in four sequential positions to give the appearance of motion.

== First version ==
Skipping Girl brand vinegar was produced by the Nycander & Co, established by Swedish immigrant and prominent bacteriologist, Oscar Emile Nycander (1859-1927), who established Australia's first yeast manufactory and vinegar brewery. The large Nycander factory housed 17 fermentation vats, each with a capacity of 35,000 gallons,

The sign was designed in 1936 for the Nycander factory premises by artist Jim Minogue (who would go on to build the Nylex Clock in 1961), employed by Electric Signs, later called Whitewall Neon, then Claude Neon (after Georges Claude). As was usual practice, Electric Signs built and operated the sign, for which Nycander paid an annual rent. The sign advertising their "Skipping Girl" brand of vinegar was immediately popular, becoming a well loved landmark.

The origin of the connection between vinegar and a skipping girl is a skipping rhyme, usually "salt, vinegar, mustard, pepper, if I dare, I can do better..." to which the rope would be spun faster. In 1938, the company promoted its product with a girls' skipping competition.

== Removal ==
In the 1950s, Nycander & Co was taken over by direct competitors Mauri Brothers & Thompson, resulting in closure of the Abbotsford works in the mid-1960s. When the building was demolished in 1968 the sign was removed. Neon Electric attempted to reacquire 'Little Audrey', but the demolition company Whelan the Wrecker claimed ownership and sold it to CE Haywwood, a used car dealership.

== 1970s version ==
Following public outcry, John (Jack) Benjamin, director of the nearby electroplating factory Crusader Plate, worked with the local council to acquire and reinstate the sign on his company's own roof. Since the original had been sold, a smaller, updated version was built and placed on the roof of the electroplating factory at 651 Victoria Street in 1970. The 1970 version was listed by the National Trust in 2000, and has also been listed on the Victorian Heritage Register.

The sign was illuminated until 2002 when the sign's owners (by then the owners of the building) decided to cease funding of the power and maintenance required for operation.

== Restoration ==
In May 2008 an appeal was launched for public donations to restore the sign by the National Trust, at the instigation of the group 'Friends of Audrey', and with the cooperation of the sign's owners (the owners of the building), Spring & Parks Pty Ltd. The appeal attracted energy company AGL Energy, who ultimately paid for most of the restoration, power and ongoing repairs in return for advertising space at the base of the sign.

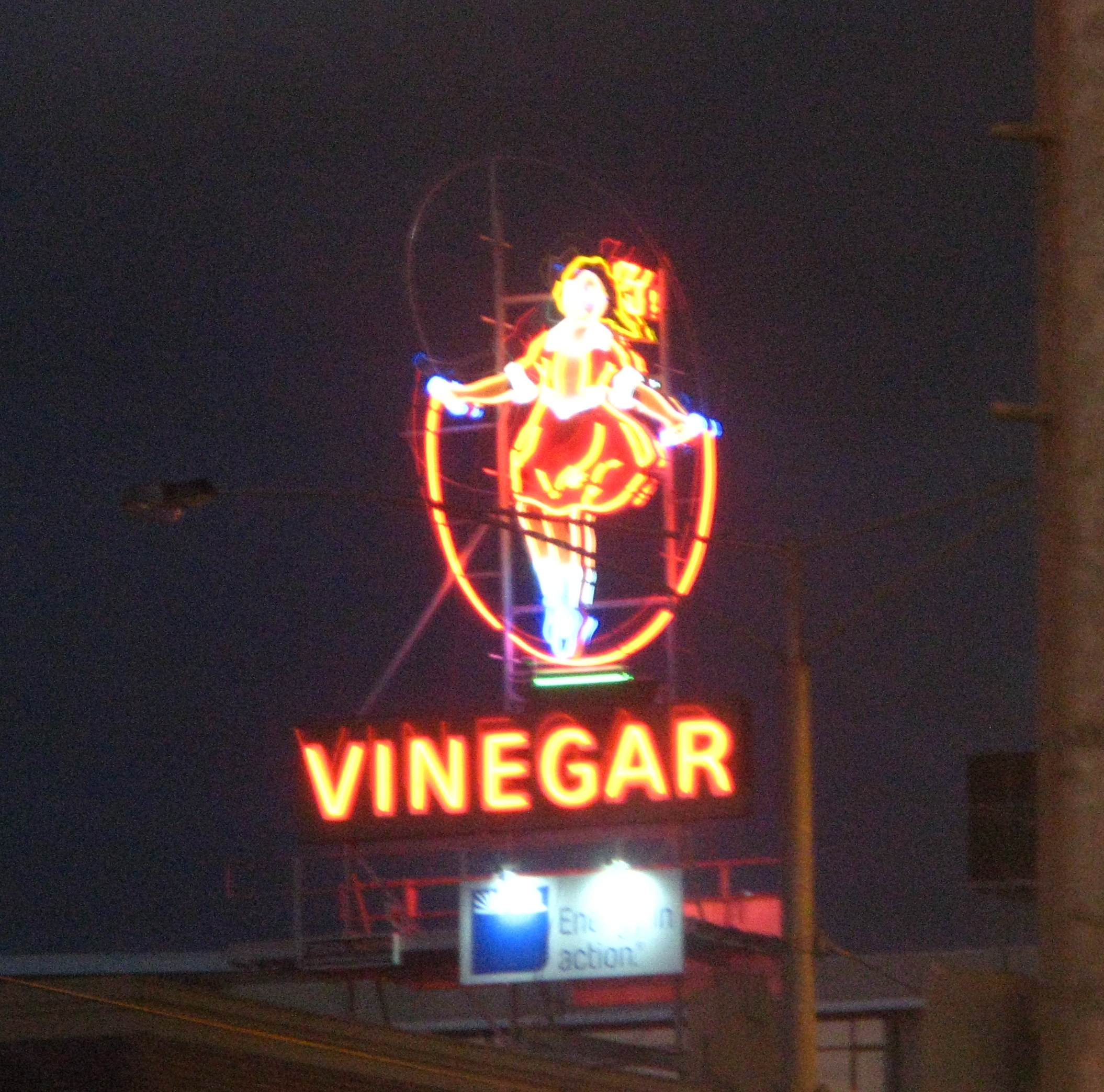
The sign at dusk

Little Audrey was taken down for repairs by Delta Neon on 23 March 2009, and placed back on its perch on 10 June of the same year. In 2012, AGL announced that power would be provided by 27 solar panels on the roof of the building under their 100% GreenPower energy plan.

== Sale of building ==
On 13 February 2020 the media reported that the strata title holders of the former Crusader Plate factory had banded together to sell the building. While there is a 'Discretionary' 18m height limit on the site due to the Yarra River Corridor protection zone (in place since 2017), and the building itself is heritage listed, this may result in extra floors on the building and the sign being moved higher up.

== Cultural influences ==
1973 LP album Country Girl (RCA) features the track Skipping Girl written by Barry Humphries and sung by Australian folk singer Shirley Jacobs (1927—2015).

In the Melbourne made-for-television film 'Bachelor Girl' (1987, dir. Rivka Hartmann) the sign features in a scene in which heroine Dot Bloom cycles past late at night.

The Skipping Girl Vinegar sign features in Australian artist Howard Arkley's (1951-1999) 'Suicide' (1983, acrylic on canvas, 160cmx120cm) drawing on imagery from Arkley's childhood; the neon Skipping Girl Vinegar sign, an image of a telescope from a Boy's Own Annual, and memories he shared with his girlfriend Lisa Craswell (d.1987). Speaking of this work in 1996, Arkley recalled: "Lisa Craswell and I used to go there [to the Skipping Girl] together and talk about our childhoods. It would be one or two in the morning, lonely and cold. 'Suicide' was inspired by a nice childhood experience. But it was like the end of my childhood. When Lisa died in 1987, it became for her." This work from the artist's prime period featured posthumously in 'Howard Arkley Retrospective' at the National Gallery of Victoria, 17 November 2006 - 25 February 2007.

When Melbourne's Southbank complex opened on the Yarra River southern frontage in September 1992, Robin Best's neon work 'Running Girl' was chosen for temporary installation atop the pedestrian bridge that joins Southbank with Flinders Street station. The work refers nostalgically to 'Little Audrey', but transforms her into a contemporary adult female jogger.

Melbourne indie pop group The Killjoys’ first recorded release was a 5 track cassette in 1988 called Audrey, with a photo of the Skipping Girl on the cover.

Melbourne indie pop group Skipping Girl Vinegar named themselves after the sign, stating "We love her, she's part of Melbourne, and an authentic old world pop icon."

She is also referenced by another Melbourne band, My Friend the Chocolate Cake, in their song "It's All in the Way".

On 1 September 2015 the Skipping Girl Sign was featured on a series of stamps commissioned by Australia Post. The series was called "Signs Of The Times" and was one of three signs to be highlighted. The other two signs were the "Dandy" Pig sign in Dandenong and the Pink Poodle Motel Sign in Surfers Paradise in Queensland.

On 13 April 2026, the Skipping Girl sign went dark for a week, and a new neon sign called Scrolling Girl lit up, as part of campaign by Dairy Farmers highlighting the damaging impact excessive screen time has on kids physical activity. The sign, which depicts a young girl mindlessly scrolling, attracted national media attention.

== See also ==
- Borsari's Corner in Carlton, Victoria
- Dingo Flour sign in North Fremantle, Western Australia
- Nylex Clock in Cremorne, Victoria
- Pelaco Sign in Richmond, Victoria
