= Rocky Bay railway line =

Overview
- Status: Lifted
- Owner: Westrail; CSR
- Locale: North Fremantle

History
- Opened: 30 January 1931
- Closed: 15 July 1978

Technical
- Line length: 1.6 kilometres
- Track gauge: 1,067 mm (3 ft 6 in)

The Rocky Bay railway line was an industrial railway line in North Fremantle, Western Australia.

== History ==
The Rocky Bay railway line opened on 30 January 1931. It branched off in a north-east direction from the Eastern Railway just north of North Fremantle station opposite Leighton Marshalling Yard crossing over the Stirling Highway via a level crossing.

It served the Great Southern Flour Mill, a Ford plant, the State Engineering Works, a Mount Lyell Mining & Railway Company superphosphate factory and a CSR sugar refinery. The eastern part of the line was owned by CSR, the rest by the Western Australian Government Railways.

It was closed on 15 July 1978 apart from a short stump for the Great Southern Flour Mill. The last section of the line was lifted in April 1991.
