= Borsari's Corner =

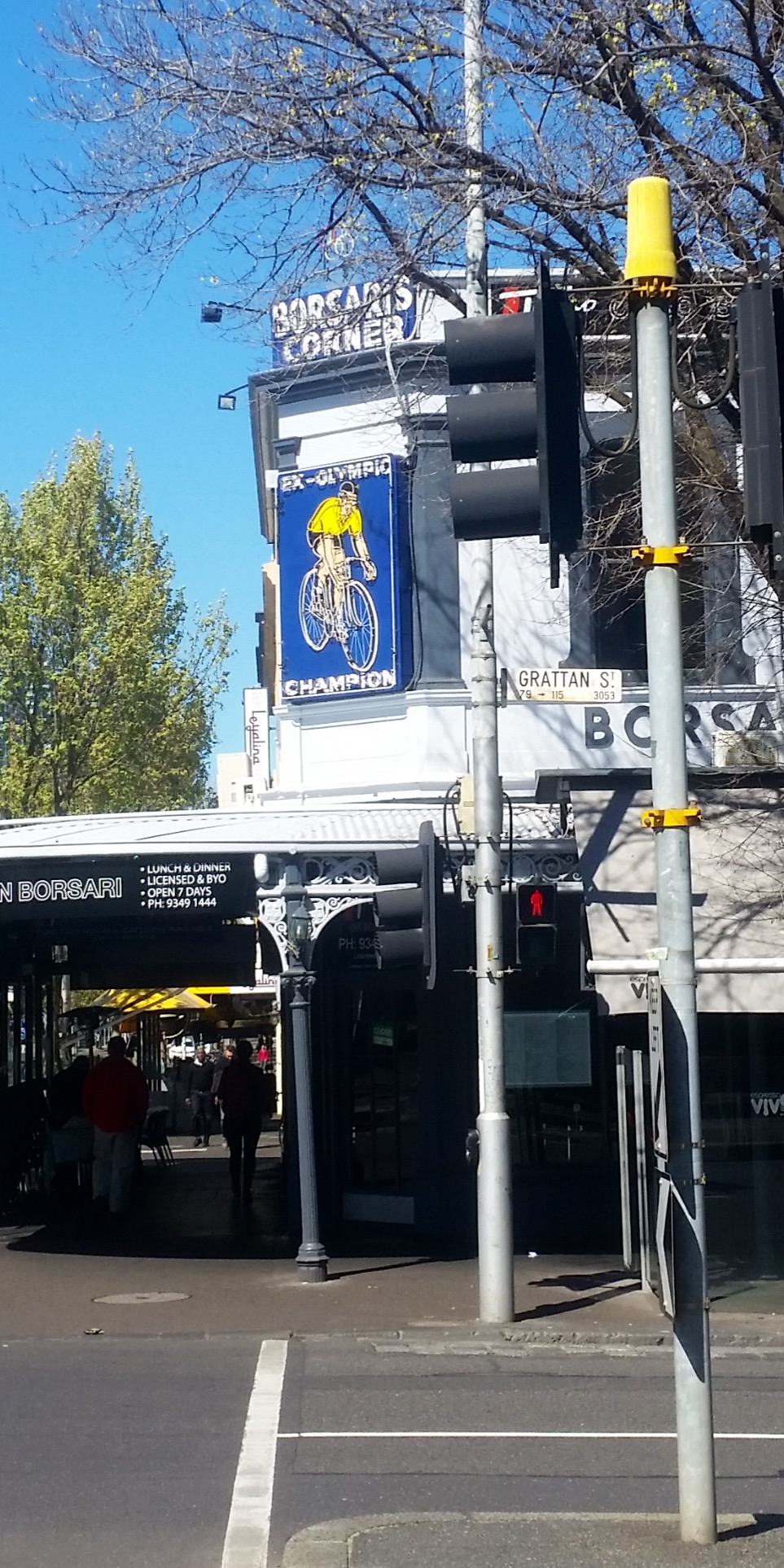
- Neon sign at Borsari's Corner
- Interactive map of Borsari's Corner
- Namesake: Named for Nino Borsari
- Addresses: Corner Lygon & Grattan Streets
- Location: Melbourne, Australia
- Postal code: 3053
- Coordinates: 37.800556°S 144.966667°E

Borsari's Corner is at the intersection of Lygon and Grattan Streets, in Carlton, Victoria, Australia.

== History ==
The corner is named after Nino Borsari, a member of the Gold medal-winning Italian pursuit cycling team at the 1932 Olympics, who was competing in Australia when World War II broke out. Unable to return home, he established a bicycle repair shop on the corner in 1941. It is located by the intersection of Lygon Street and Grattan Streets, in Carlton, Victoria, Australia.

In the late 1940s, a neon sign of Borsari was erected, and is currently of heritage significance. Borsari was active in the local Italian community, organising cultural and welfare activities.

The corner has become so well known that in 1967 Italian president Giuseppe Saragat delivered a speech at the spot.

== See also ==
- Dingo Flour sign in North Fremantle, Western Australia
- Nylex Clock in Cremorne, Victoria
- Pelaco Sign in Richmond, Victoria
- Skipping Girl Sign in Abbotsford, Victoria
