= Pelaco Sign =

Australian neon building sign

Coordinates: 37.819300°S 144.995471°E

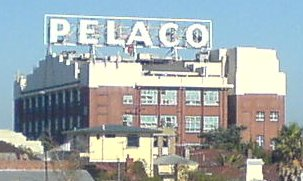
Pelaco Building

The Pelaco Sign is a heritage-listed neon sign located in the inner Melbourne suburb of Richmond. It was erected in 1939 as an advertisement for local shirt manufacturer Pelaco.

Melbourne-based rockabilly group, The Pelaco Brothers (1974–75), were named after the sign. The Pelaco sign is visible in many scenes of the 1986 film Dogs In Space. High on a building on Richmond Hill, it can be seen from many suburbs away especially when lit at night.

The building is located at 21-31 Goodwood Street, Richmond and now houses numerous businesses including radio stations Gold 104.3 and KIIS 101.1, Madman Entertainment and media production company Fremantle and Authentic Entertainment.

== See also ==
- Borsari's Corner in Carlton, Victoria
- Dingo Flour sign in North Fremantle, Western Australia
- Nylex Clock in Cremorne, Victoria
- Skipping Girl Sign in Abbotsford, Victoria
