= North Fremantle railway station =

Railway station in Perth, Western Australia

North Fremantle
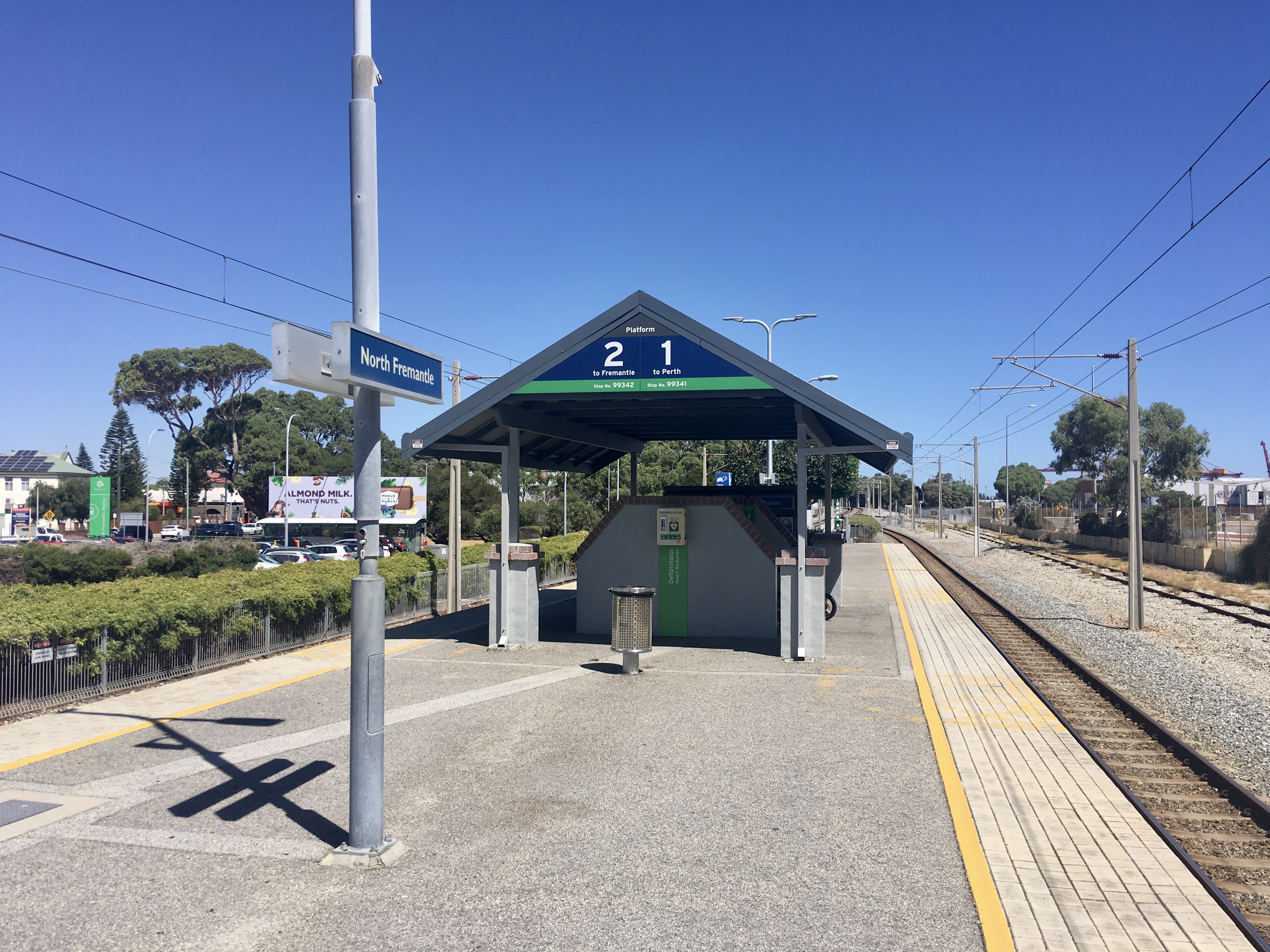
- Southbound view from Platform 1, showing station shelter, March 2022

General information
- Location: Stirling Highway, North Fremantle; Australia
- Coordinates: 32°01′48″S 115°45′06″E
- Owner: Public Transport Authority
- Operator: Transperth
- Line: Fremantle line
- Distance: 16.2 kilometres (10.1 mi) from Perth
- Platforms: 2 (1 island)
- Tracks: 3

Construction
- Structure type: Ground

Other information
- Station code: FNF; 99341 (platform 1); 99342 (platform 2)
- Fare zone: 2

History
- Opened: 1881
- Rebuilt: 28 July 1991

Passengers
- 2013–14: 168,147

Services
| Preceding station | Transperth | Following station |
|---|---|---|
| Victoria Street towards Perth | Fremantle line | Fremantle Terminus |
Former services
| Leighton towards Perth | Fremantle line | Fremantle Terminus |
Location
- Location of North Fremantle railway station

North Fremantle railway station is a railway station on the Transperth network. It is located on the Fremantle line, 16.2 kilometres from Perth, serving the Fremantle suburb of North Fremantle.

== History ==
The original North Fremantle station on the north side of Tydeman Street opened in 1881.

The station and yard was linked to the Rocky Bay line, during the existence of the life of the branch line. It was also linked to the Leighton Marshalling Yard, and the railway lines in the grounds of North Wharf of Fremantle Harbour.

In 1964, a new station halt opened in conjunction with a new Fremantle Railway Bridge with the original site redeveloped as a diesel locomotive depot. On 28 July 1991 as part of the electrification of the line, a new station opened 800 metres to the north also replacing Leighton station that was a further 700 metres further north.

From 2034, North Fremantle station's platforms are planned to be extended to the north to accommodate six-car trains.

== Services ==
=== Train services ===
North Fremantle station is served by Transperth Fremantle line services from Fremantle to Perth that continue through to Midland via the Midland line.

North Fremantle station saw 168,147 passengers in the 2013–14 financial year.

==== Platforms ====
North Fremantle platform arrangement
| Stop ID | Platform | Line | Service Pattern | Destination | Notes |
|---|---|---|---|---|---|
| 99341 | 1 | Fremantle line | All stations, +S | Perth | |
| 99342 | 2 | Fremantle line | All stations, +S | Fremantle | |

=== Bus routes ===
| Stop | Route | Destination / description | Notes |
|---|---|---|---|
| Stirling Highway (north bound) | 998 | CircleRoute clockwise via Stirling Highway | Limited stops |
| Stirling Highway (north bound) | 107 | to Claremont Station via Victoria Street & Palmerston Street | |
| Stirling Highway (north bound) | 906 | Rail replacement service to Perth station | |
| Stirling Highway (south bound) | 999 | CircleRoute anti-clockwise via Stirling Highway | Limited stops |
| Stirling Highway (south bound) | 107 | to Fremantle Station via Queen Victoria Street | |
| Stirling Highway (south bound) | 906 | Rail replacement service to Fremantle station | |
