= Leighton railway station =

Former railway station in Western Australia, 1922–1991

Leighton
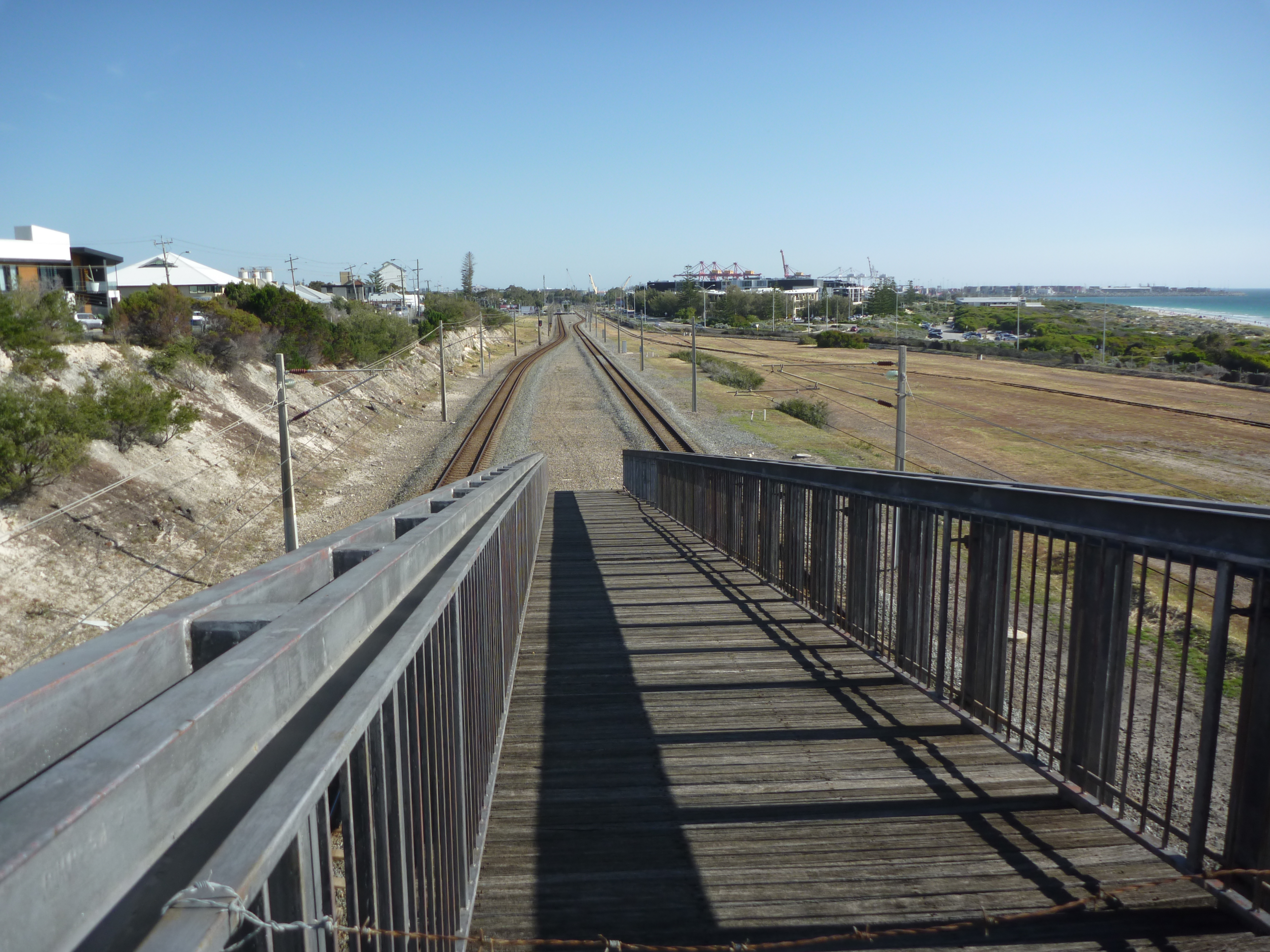
- Station remnants seen from wooden pedestrian footbridge, October 2020

General information
- Coordinates: 32°01′30″S 115°45′09″E
- Owner: Western Australian Government Railways
- Operator: Westrail
- Line: Fremantle line
- Distance: 15.7 km (9.8 mi) from Perth
- Platforms: 2 (1 island)
- Tracks: 2
- Train operators: Ground

History
- Opened: 12 April 1922; 104 years ago
- Closed: 28 July 1991; 35 years ago

Services
Preceding station	Transperth	Following station
Victoria Street towards Perth	Fremantle line	North Fremantle towards Fremantle
Track layout
Location
- Location of Leighton railway station

Leighton Station was a railway station on the Transperth network in Perth, Western Australia. It was located on the Fremantle line around 15.7 kilometres (9.8 mi) from Perth, serving the Fremantle suburb of North Fremantle.

== History ==
Leighton Station opened on 12 April 1922 and was named after Leighton's Crossing – which was named for Ann Leighton, its gatekeeper from 1881 to 1885. Along with the rest of the Fremantle line, Leighton closed on 1 September 1979 due to low passenger counts. It reopened in 1983 with the rest of the line following a change of government.

During the 1980s when the Fremantle, Midland and Armadale lines were being electrified, the old North Fremantle station above Tydeman Road (where the current freight horseshoe curve is) was replaced by a new North Fremantle station constructed 800 metres (2,600 ft) north of the current one located north of Tydeman Road. This new station opened on 28 July 1991, causing the demise of Leighton.

== Services ==
Leighton station was served by Fremantle line services operated by Westrail on behalf of the Metropolitan Transport Trust from Fremantle to Perth.

== Platforms ==
Leighton had two platforms on an island. Services towards Perth departed from platform 1.
