= Dingo Flour sign =

Landmark in Fremantle, Western Australia

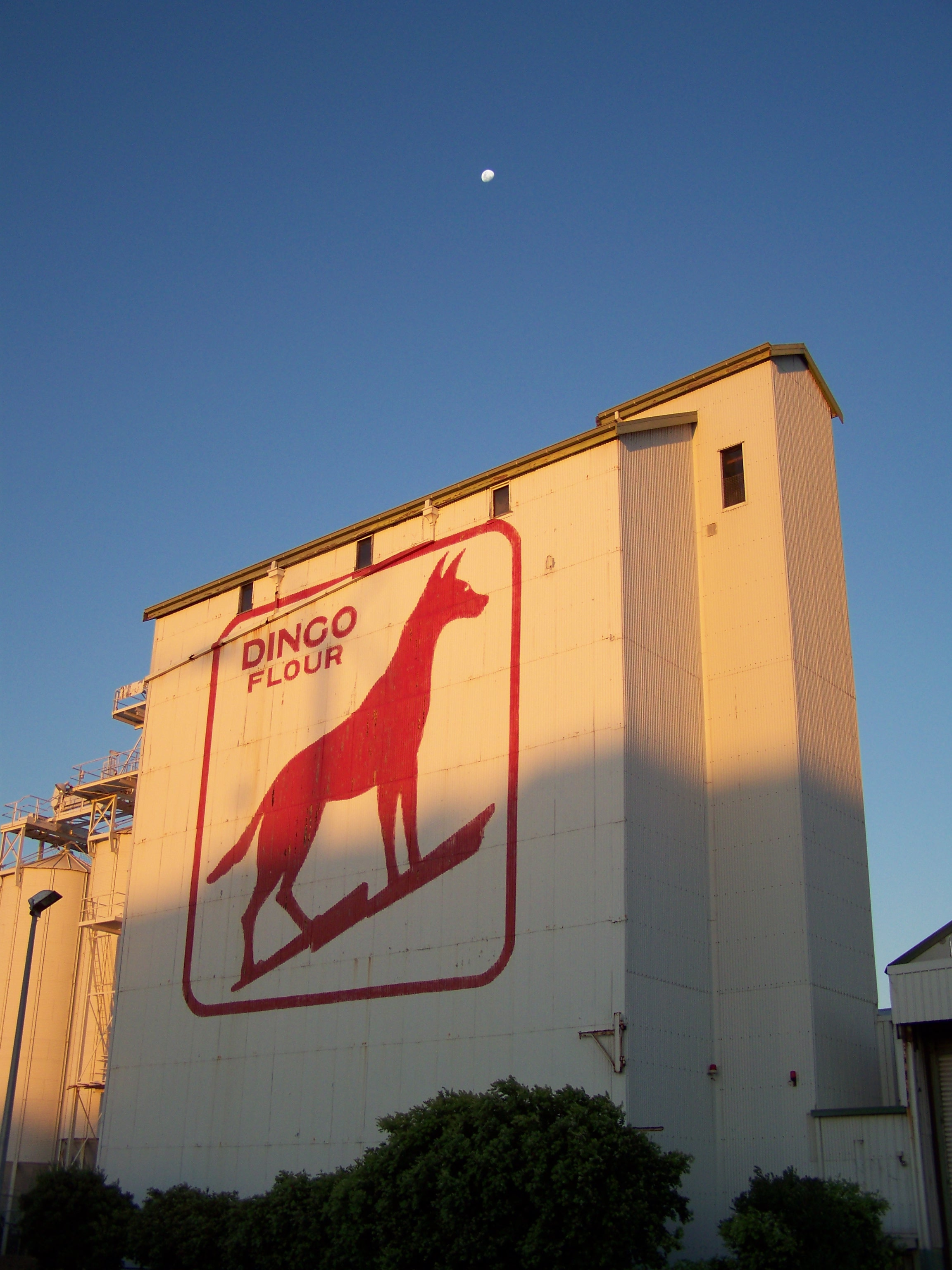
- The Dingo Flour sign
- Interactive map of the Dingo Flour sign area

General information
- Type: Sign on Flour mill
- Location: North Fremantle, Western Australia
- Coordinates: 32°01′40″S 115°45′10″E

Western Australia Heritage Register
- Official name: Great Southern Roller Flour Mill
- Type: State Registered Place
- Designated: 17 October 2008
- Reference no.: 3645

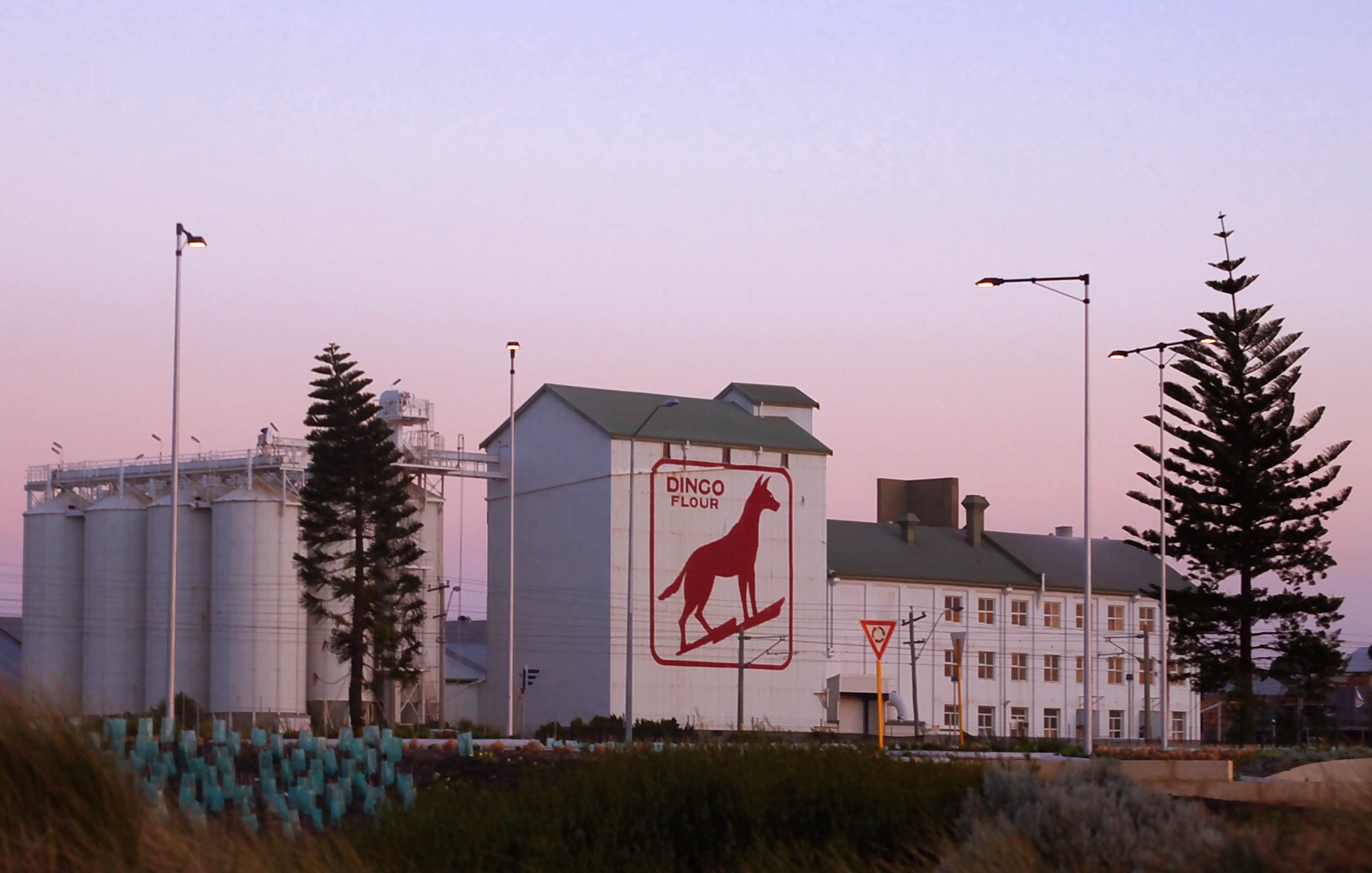
The flour mill and sign as seen from Stirling Highway

The Dingo Flour sign is a stylised silhouetted dingo in red on the side of a historic and heritage-listed working flour mill in North Fremantle, Western Australia.

The mill is in a complex known as the Great Southern Roller Flour Mills Limited. On the site (which dates from 1922) are silos, an office and laboratory and other buildings. There was a second Dingo Flour mill in Narrogin from 1903 to late October 1912, when a new company was formed to take over from the Co-operative company.

The Heritage Council of Western Australia says: “…the place has a landmark quality with strong vertical proportions, height and massing of the mill and silo structures, the Dingo Flour brand image, and the Norfolk Island pine; the place has been commonly referred to as 'Dingo Flour Mill' for many years, showing the impact of the symbol, and has developed its own set of myths, including that it was painted by Alan Bond, demonstrating that the 'dingo' contributes to the community’s sense of place…” The mill was designed by architect J. F. Allen, of Allen and Nicholas, and the office building was designed by Powell, Cameron & Chisholm Architects. The sign and the rest of the site was heritage-listed in 2008.

The dingo logo was painted by artist Les Nash in 1940 for £40. According to his daughter Mona Rankin it took her father about a week to complete the logo. Nash first sketched the dingo onto graph paper and then used the gridded panels on the silo to guide his large-scale transfer of the design onto the silo itself. It is about five and a half storeys high. It was painted over during World War II, but its outlines were still faintly visible. Refugees and migrants coming to Fremantle saw the sign, and it remains a useful reference point for boaters and anglers. It was mostly re-painted in March 2001. In 2010 the flour mill was renovated, and the dingo now gets re-painted every month.

== See also ==
- Borsari's Corner in Carlton, Victoria
- Nylex Clock in Cremorne, Victoria
- Pelaco Sign in Richmond, Victoria
- Skipping Girl Sign in Abbotsford, Victoria
