= Nylex Clock =

Heritage listed advertising sign in Melbourne, Australia

Coordinates: 37.829582°S 144.988793°E

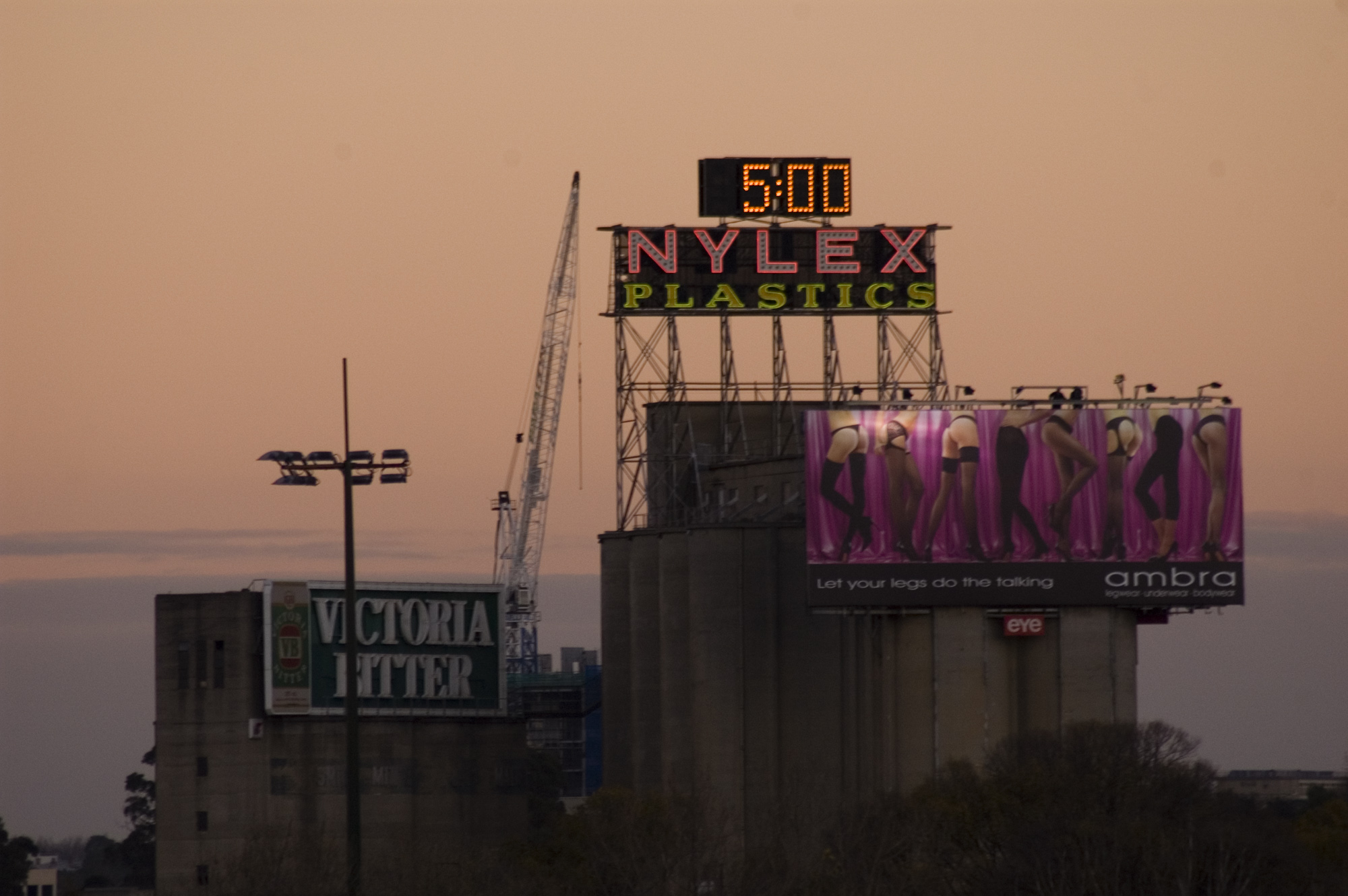
The Nylex Clock viewed from the MCG footbridge

The Nylex Clock is heritage listed as an iconic feature of Melbourne, Australia and is considered part of the popular culture of the city. It is a neon sign sitting atop malting storage silos in the suburb of Cremorne. It is located adjacent to the northern bank of the Yarra River and the Monash Freeway and displays the time and temperature alternately. The text also alternates displaying the words Nylex Plastics that changes to 'Nylex Every Time!'. It is visible from many parts of Melbourne. This linkage is referred to in the song "Leaps and Bounds" by musician Paul Kelly and was once climbed by Brisbane-based activists Freshellen Frew, Ag Heard and several other Melbourne-based activists.

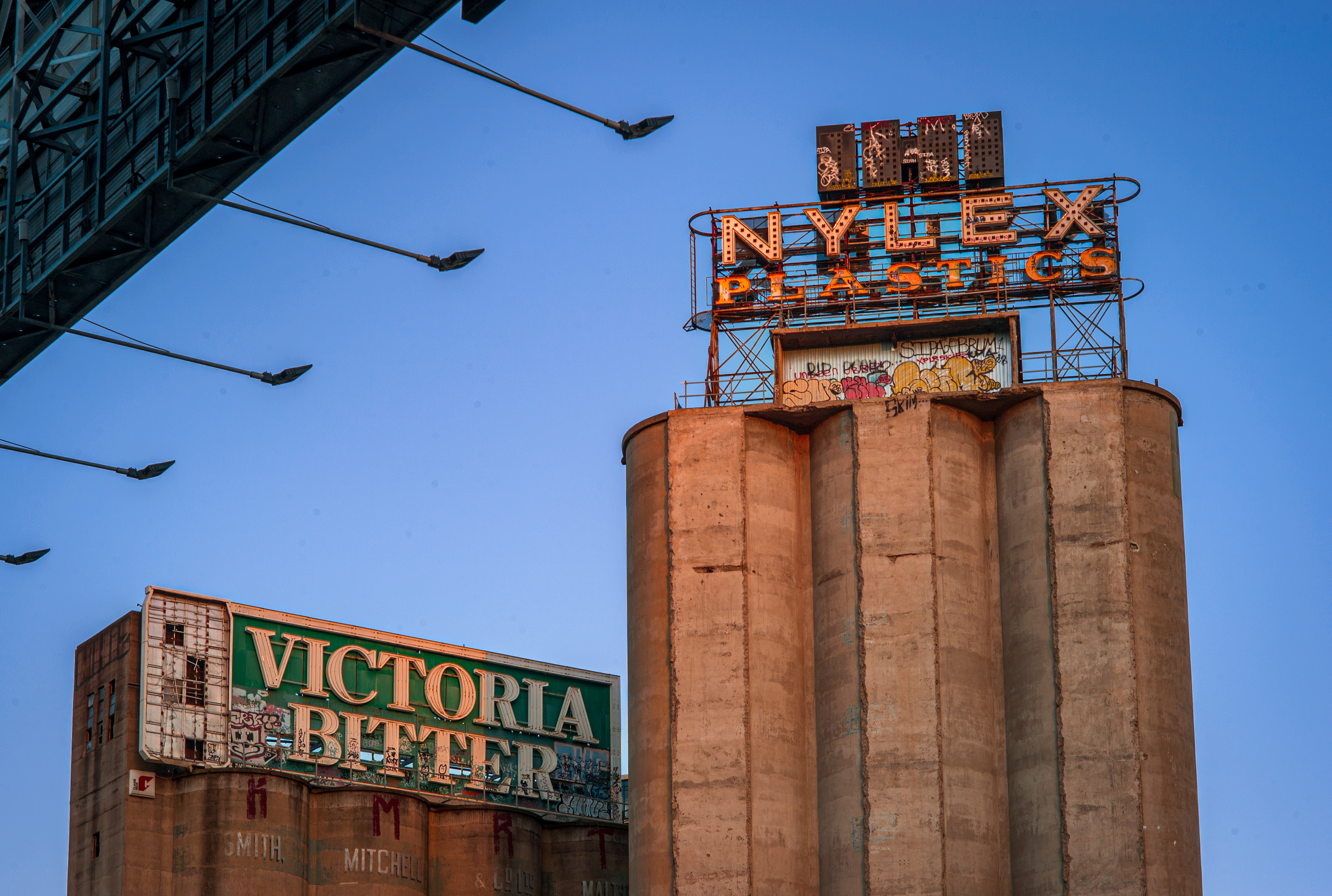
The Nylex Clock, as seen from Hoddle Street, 2024.

Australian indigenous hip-hop artists Baker Boy (Danzel Baker) and Dallas Woods shot the video for their musical collaboration 'Black Magic' in various locations throughout the site.

== History ==
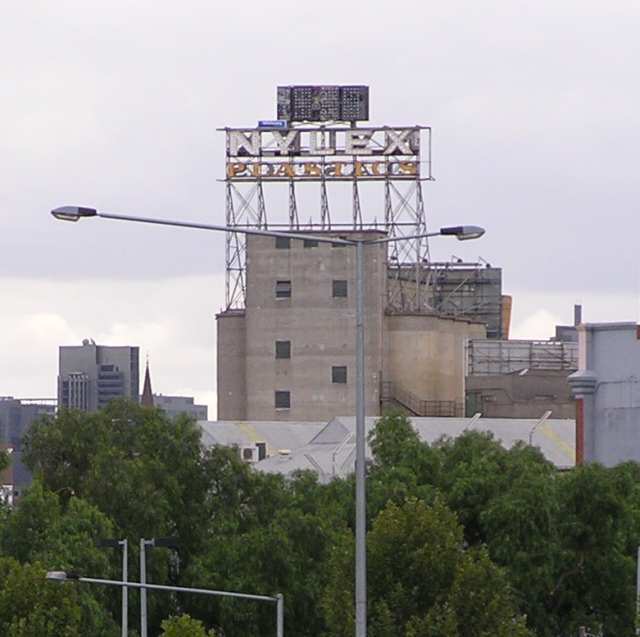
The Nylex Clock from the Church Street Bridge

The sign and clock were designed and built by South Melbourne company Neon Electric Signs and erected in 1961 on behalf of Nylex, an Australian manufacturer of plastic products. There are 20 silos on the site, located in two groups, and were built in the 1950s and 1960s to store barley.

In 2002 a $70 million office project was proposed for the site of the silos that support the clock. The architectural firm behind the project had assessed the heritage value of the site and did not find the silos historically significant enough to be retained, but agreed the Nylex sign was of value and should be kept. The redevelopment was dropped in October 2003 because of the prospect of heritage protection.

The Nylex Clock had been inoperative for a number of years, until restoration works were announced in May 2004. A listing on the Victorian Heritage Register was also applied to the sign in March that year. The 11,340 square metre silos precinct underneath the clock was sold in September 2004 in a deal believed to be worth $8.75 million. The sign itself had been owned by Australian Neon Signs, until sold to Nylex in August 2004. The location of the clock was leased from the owner of the silo.

On 29 June 2005 the clock was restarted at 7:24 am, amid heavy fog and a live broadcast by radio station 3AW. The thousands of white LEDs turned on, but the time stayed stuck on "7:24" due to a 'glitch with satellite alignment' in the equipment used to keep the time and date accurate. The sign had been out of action for 14 months, with the restoration commencing in February and costing $300,000. 17,000 LED lights were used, along with 800 metres of neon tubing and two kilometres of electrical cable.

The use of LEDs diminished the visibility of the clock in certain locations, so the luminaires were once again replaced in December 2005 with 70-degree orange coloured LEDs.

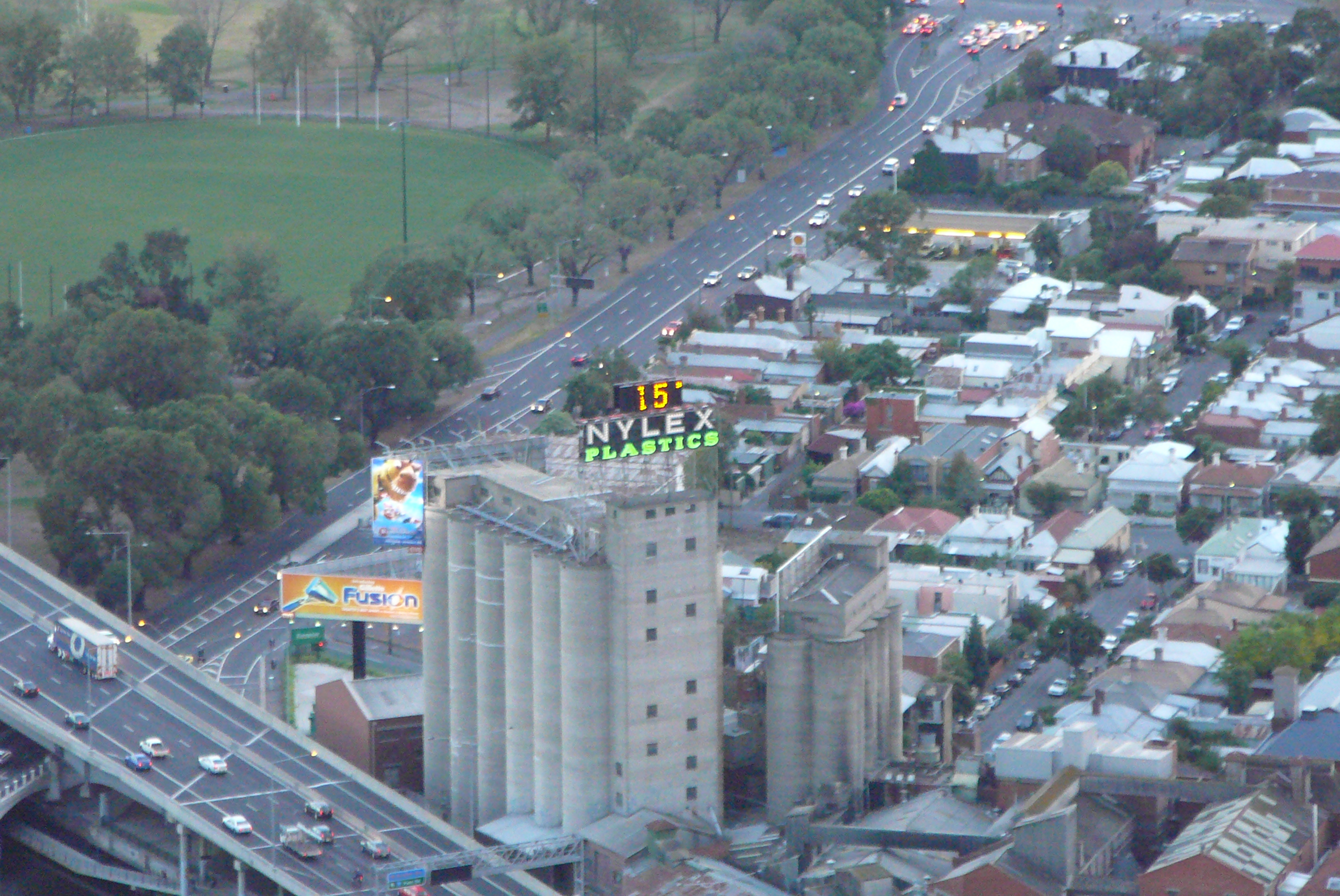
Nylex Clock showing temperature in 2007

For several days in May 2006 the clock was frozen at "6:38", with a surge protector being installed to avoid a recurrence. The clock again broke down at 5:45 am on 6 September 2006 but wet weather hampered efforts to investigate the fault. In March 2009 the clock was switched off due to Nylex going into receivership. To date there has been no forthcoming information from Cremorne council about when the sign will be switched on despite public outrage. Because the sign and operating costs were the property of Nylex, the public hope the council will assume responsibility of the costs. Since March 2009, the clock and associated temperature display have been inoperative. The clock was briefly illuminated again on Thursday, 29 January 2015, when a group calling themselves 'The Nylex Clock Collective' broke into the silos and found the switch to the clock. Drivers reported the clock running an hour behind, as it had not been adjusted for daylight saving time.

In March 2017 Heritage Victoria approved permits for development of two towers of 13 storeys and 14 storeys, and also saves some of the sprawling industrial site's landmark concrete silos. Developer Caydon had originally earmarked the silos for demolition to make way for its precinct of apartments, offices and restaurants, but more than half of the 1962 silos will now be retained. Nylex sign and clock which also once showed the temperature will be restored to working order, however the landmark will disappear from Melbourne's skyline for a number of years, as it will be put into storage during construction.

On 12 November 2017 a fire broke out in an abandoned nearby factory causing traffic jams. The Punt Road CityLink onramp was closed for 24 hours. Concerns have been raised that the blaze was deliberately lit, possibly by squatters. Up to 50 firefighters took several hours to contain the blaze.

== See also ==
- Borsari's Corner in Carlton, Victoria
- Dingo Flour sign in North Fremantle, Western Australia
- Pelaco Sign in Richmond, Victoria
- Skipping Girl Sign in Abbotsford, Victoria
