= Pelaco =

Australian clothing manufacturer

Pelaco International Pty Ltd
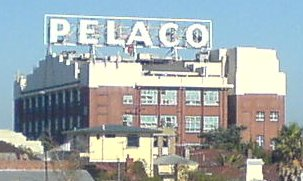
- The heritage listed sign above Pelaco's former factory in Richmond, Victoria
- Trade name: Pelaco
- Type: Private company
- Industry: Retail
- Founded: 1910s

Pelaco was an Australian clothing manufacturer based in Melbourne. Pelaco is best known for its men's shirts. The Pelaco sign over its former factory in Richmond is a Heritage Victoria listed landmark.

== Foundation ==
The Pelaco brand was founded in the 1910s by James Kerr Pearson (born 31 July 1881 in Glasgow, Scotland — died 2 October 1950 in Richmond, Victoria) and James Lindsay Gordon Law (born 21 January 1881 in Ballarat, Victoria — died 18 February 1963, Fitzroy, Victoria). The company name came from the first two letters of its owners' surnames.

== Products ==
From its inception, Pelaco's main product has been men's shirts.

== Industrial relations ==
The Pelaco company under Lindsay Law has been described as innovative in its approach to industrial relations.

Saturday morning work was discontinued in its predecessor business in 1908. The company management appointed an "industrial relations officer" to mediate with employees in 1928. Pelaco was one of the first companies in Australia to employ an industrial psychologist. Lindsay Law came into conflict with unions and arbitration courts over the issues of piecework wages and child labour.

== Business head office and factories ==
In 1922, the company moved its head office and factory from elsewhere in Richmond to Goodwood Street, Richmond. The "Pelaco" neon sign over the Goodwood Street factory was erected in 1939. At the company's peak in the 1950s, it had ten factories across Australia.

== Cultural references ==
Australian football player Royce Hart was recruited to Richmond Football Club from Tasmanian team Clarence Football Club with the promise of "a new suit and six shirts". The "six shirts" were "half a dozen Pelacos".
