= Grattan Street =

Street in Melbourne, Victoria

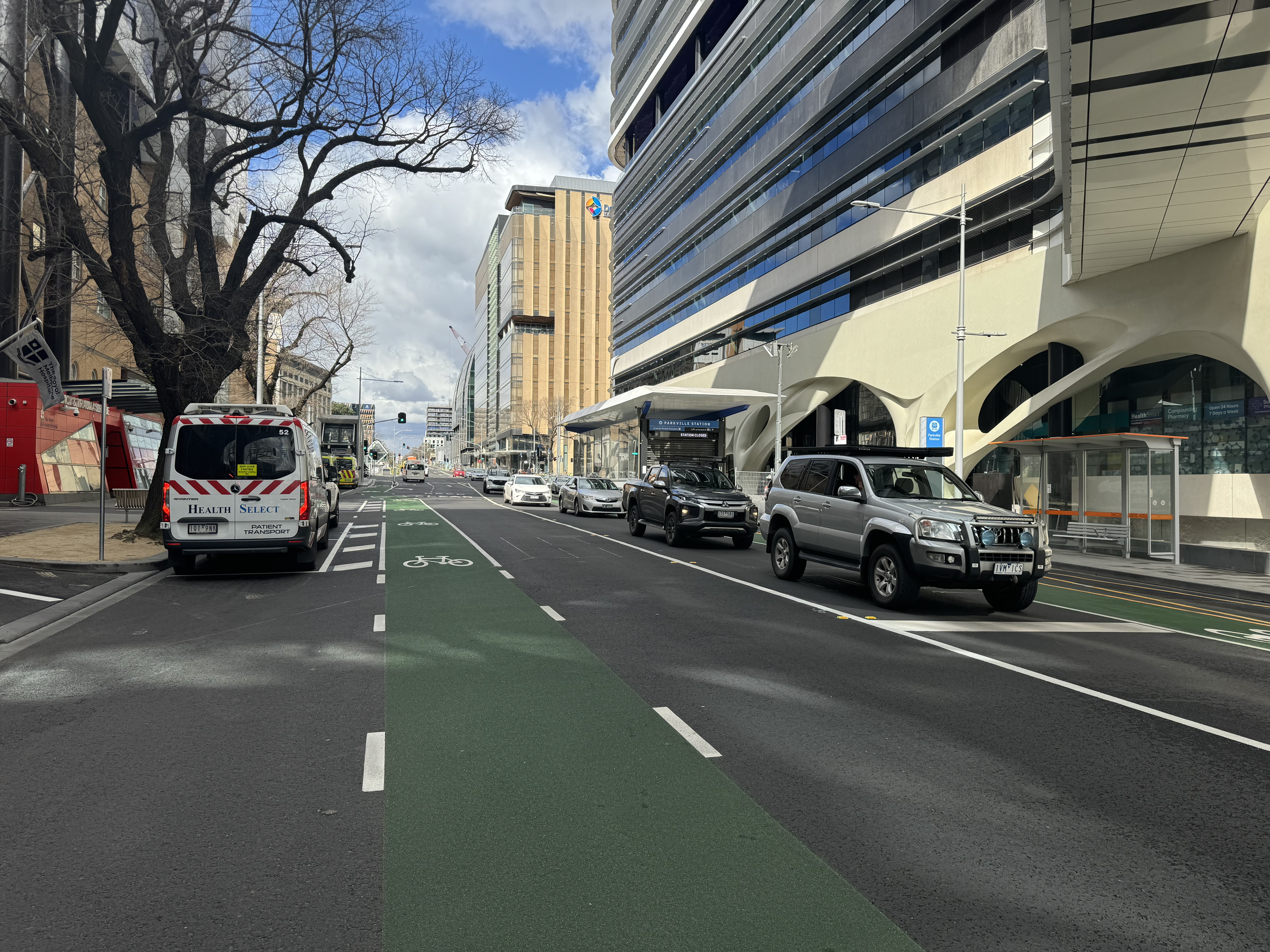
- Eastbound view of Grattan Street, taken near the Royal Parade intersection, September 2024
- Length: 1.4 km (0.87 mi)
- Location: Melbourne, Australia
- Coordinates: 37.80081°S 144.96743°E
- West end: Flemington Road
- East end: Rathdowne Street

Grattan Street is a major street in Melbourne, Australia.

== History ==
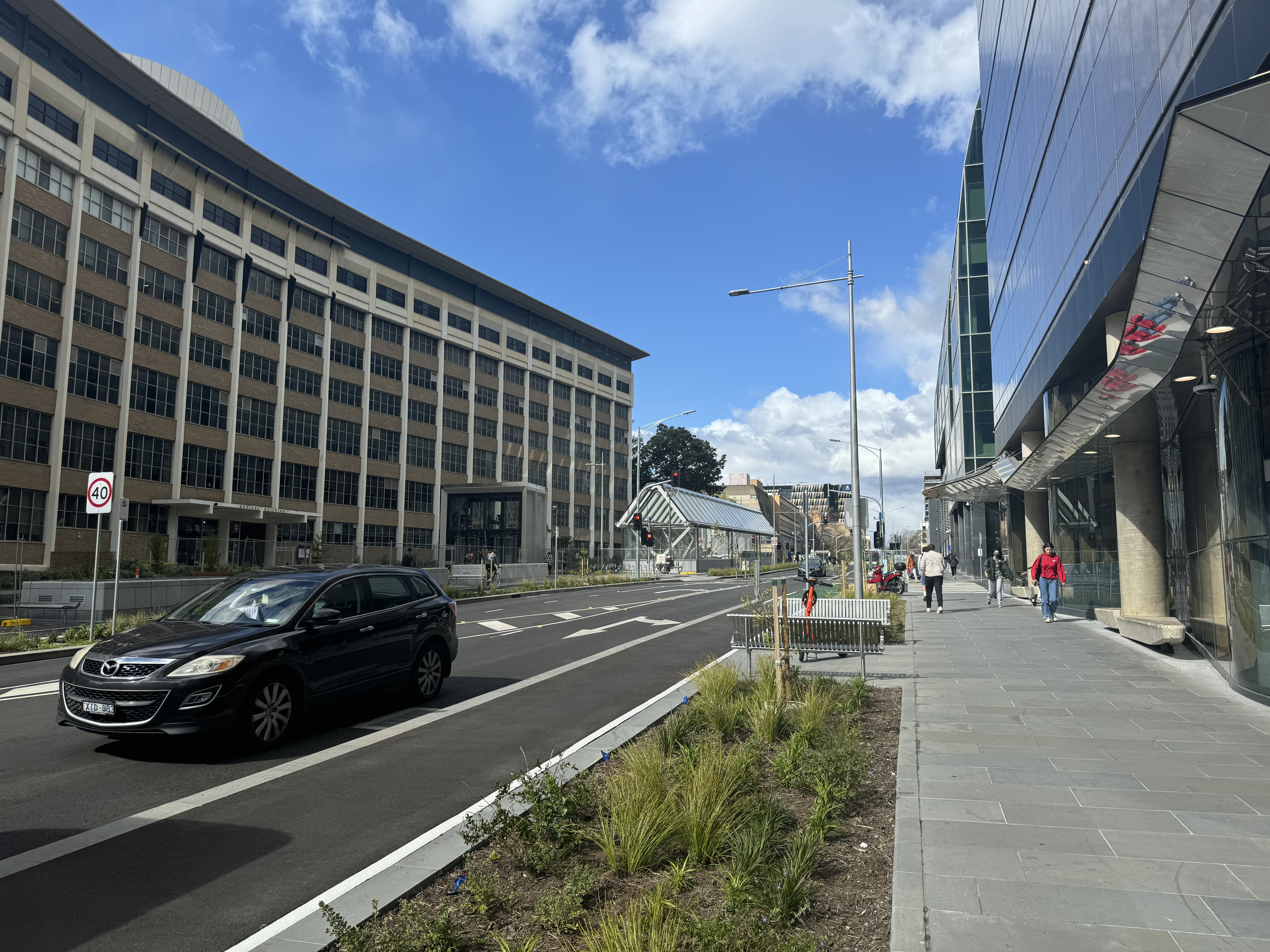
Grattan Street shortly after reopening. Parkville railway station main entrance can be seen to the left

Since 2020, Grattan Street has been split by the building works for a new pedestrian zone adjoining the university, and for the construction of Parkville railway station.

In June 2024, Grattan Street reopened to traffic and pedestrians after more than six years of closure between Royal Parade and Leicester Street. It reopened after the major construction works on the Metro Tunnel for Parkville station. On 14 July 2024, bus routes 401, 402, 403, 505 and 546 returned to revenue service along Grattan Street after more than six years.

== Location ==
It runs from Flemington Road on the Western side to Rathdowne Street on the Eastern Side. It is bisected by Elizabeth Street/Royal Parade, Berkeley Street (South), Barry Street (South), Leicester Street (South), Malvina Place (South), Bouverie Street (South), Swanston Street, Cardigan Street, Lygon Street, Watt Lane (South), Drummond Street and Erskine Lane.

== Landmarks ==
The street runs through the campus of the University of Melbourne. Other landmarks include the Melbourne Teachers' College, Borsari's Corner, Graduate House, Melbourne University Regiment and the Royal Melbourne Hospital.
