= Fremantle Railway Bridge =

Railway bridge on the Fremantle railway

Coordinates: 32.0414°S 115.7538°E

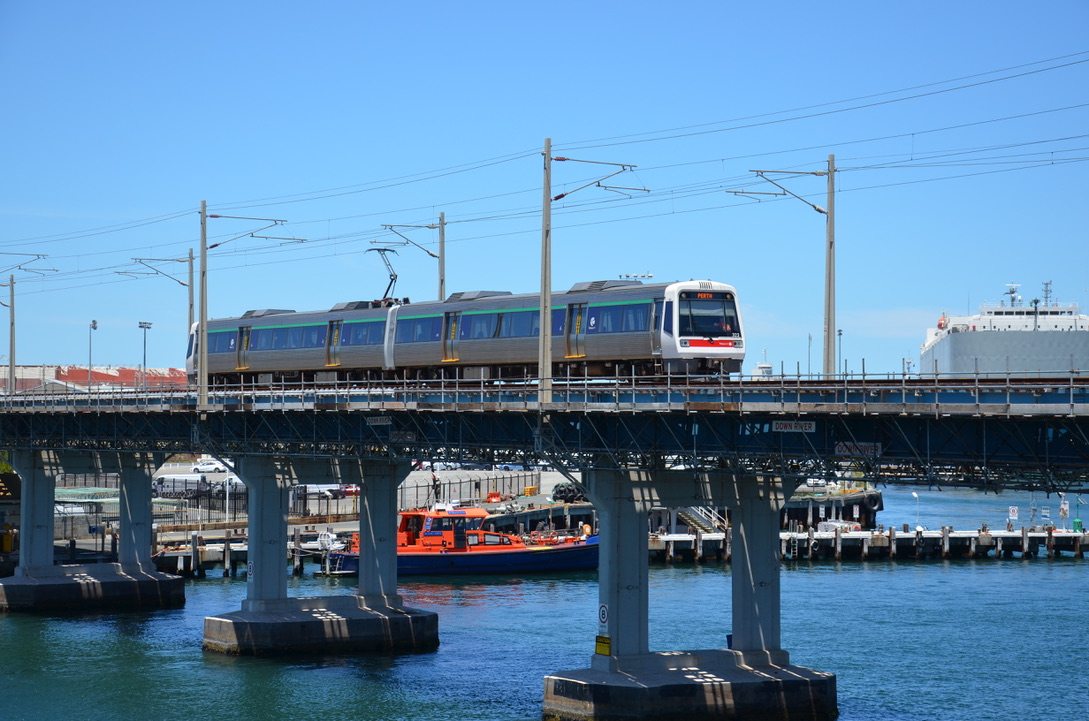
A Transperth A-series train crossing the Fremantle Railway Bridge

Fremantle Railway Bridge (known also as the North Fremantle Bridge) is a railway bridge on the Fremantle railway line that crosses the Swan River between Fremantle and North Fremantle. It is the third structure with that name, and carries both passenger and freight trains into the port city.

== Previous bridges ==
The first railway bridge opened in 1880. It was of concern due to its structure, as well as its position limiting the eastern extent of the Fremantle Harbour. It was demolished in 1895–1897, after the second bridge came into operation.

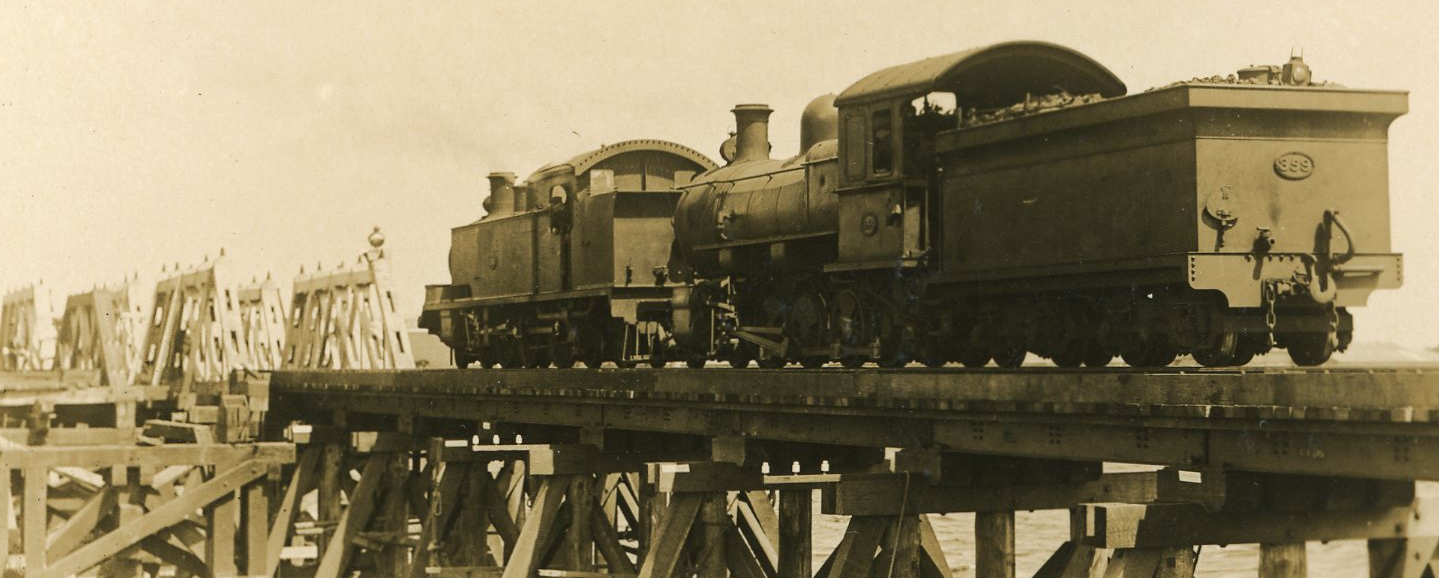
Load testing on the repaired section of the bridge, 1926

In 1926, the second bridge was destroyed by a flood, but was re-built soon after.

== Current bridge ==
The third and current bridge, which was planned in the 1950s, was opened in 1964. Made out of steel and concrete, it is further upstream and closer to the Fremantle Traffic Bridge than the earlier lower structure.

In May 2011, a bunker barge hit the bridge, damaging one of the steel masts which support the train line’s overhead power cables. In August 2014, a meteotsunami caused strong currents which broke the moorings of a container ship. The ship collided with the railway bridge which damaged a pier and an overhead power structure. The bridge was closed for two weeks. It now has barriers to prevent further collisions.

There are plans to duplicate the bridge in order to separate passenger and freight trains crossing the river.

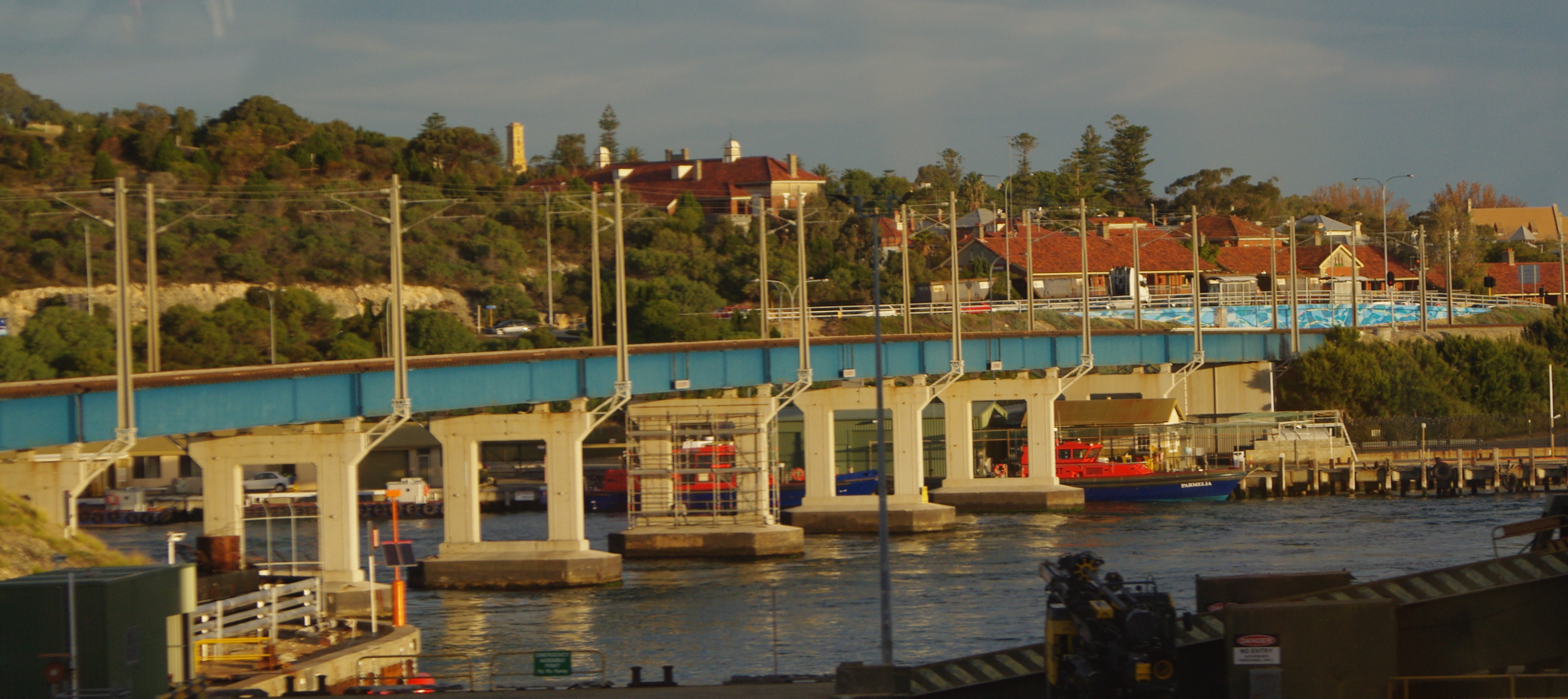
Bridge from north, 2010
