= St Ignatius' Church, Richmond =

- The spire of St Ignatius' Church
- St Ignatius' Church, Richmond
- Address: Church Street, Richmond, Melbourne, Victoria
- Country: Australia
- Denomination: Roman Catholic
- Religious order: Australian Jesuits
- Website: www.ignatius.org.au

History
- Status: Church
- Founded: 4 August 1867
- Dedication: Ignatius Loyola

Architecture
- Functional status: Active
- Architects: William Wardell (1867 – 1894); Gerald W. Vanheems (1927 – 1928)
- Architectural type: Church
- Style: Gothic Revival
- Years built: 1867 – 1928
- Construction cost: £42,000

Specifications
- Capacity: 2,000
- Length: 63 metres (206 ft)
- Height: 20 metres (65 ft)
- Materials: Bluestone

Administration
- Archdiocese: Melbourne
- Parish: Richmond Catholic Parish of St Ignatius and St James

St Ignatius' Church, Richmond is a Roman Catholic church located in the Melbourne suburb of Richmond, Victoria, Australia. It is one of the largest churches in Melbourne outside of the central business district. It is located in a prominent position, the highest point in Richmond, on Church Street.

== History ==
St Ignatius' Church was designed by English born architect William Wardell who had already made a name for himself in England and was also responsible for many of Melbourne's most important early buildings including St Patrick's Cathedral. Like St Patrick's it is in the Gothic Revival style and constructed from local bluestone. The foundation stone was laid on 4 August 1867. The members of the predominantly Irish working class parish managed to save £700 towards construction, a large sum at the time. Stage one of the church was completed in 1927. This was made up of the nave and part of the tower and allowed services to commence.

Construction of the remaining sections of the church took many years due to financial constraints. The transept was completed in 1888 and the remainder, less the spire, in 1892. It was nearly 40 years later that the spire was completed. Designed by architect G. W. Vanheems, it was much taller than that originally proposed by Wardell. When completed in 1928 it was the tallest structure in Australia at 65 metres (213 ft) high. Vanheems later designed the even taller spire of St Patrick's which was added, also belatedly, in 1939.

A primary school of the same name operated for several decades behind the Church before its closure and amalgamation with St. James' Primary School in 2005.

== Parish ==
The Catholic Parish of Ignatius is administered by the Australian Jesuits on behalf of the Archdiocese of Melbourne.

== Gallery ==
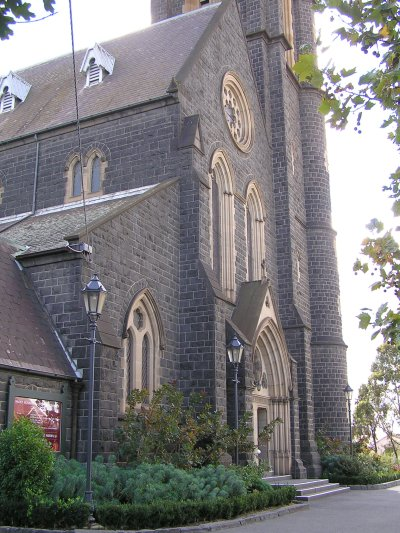
Church entrance

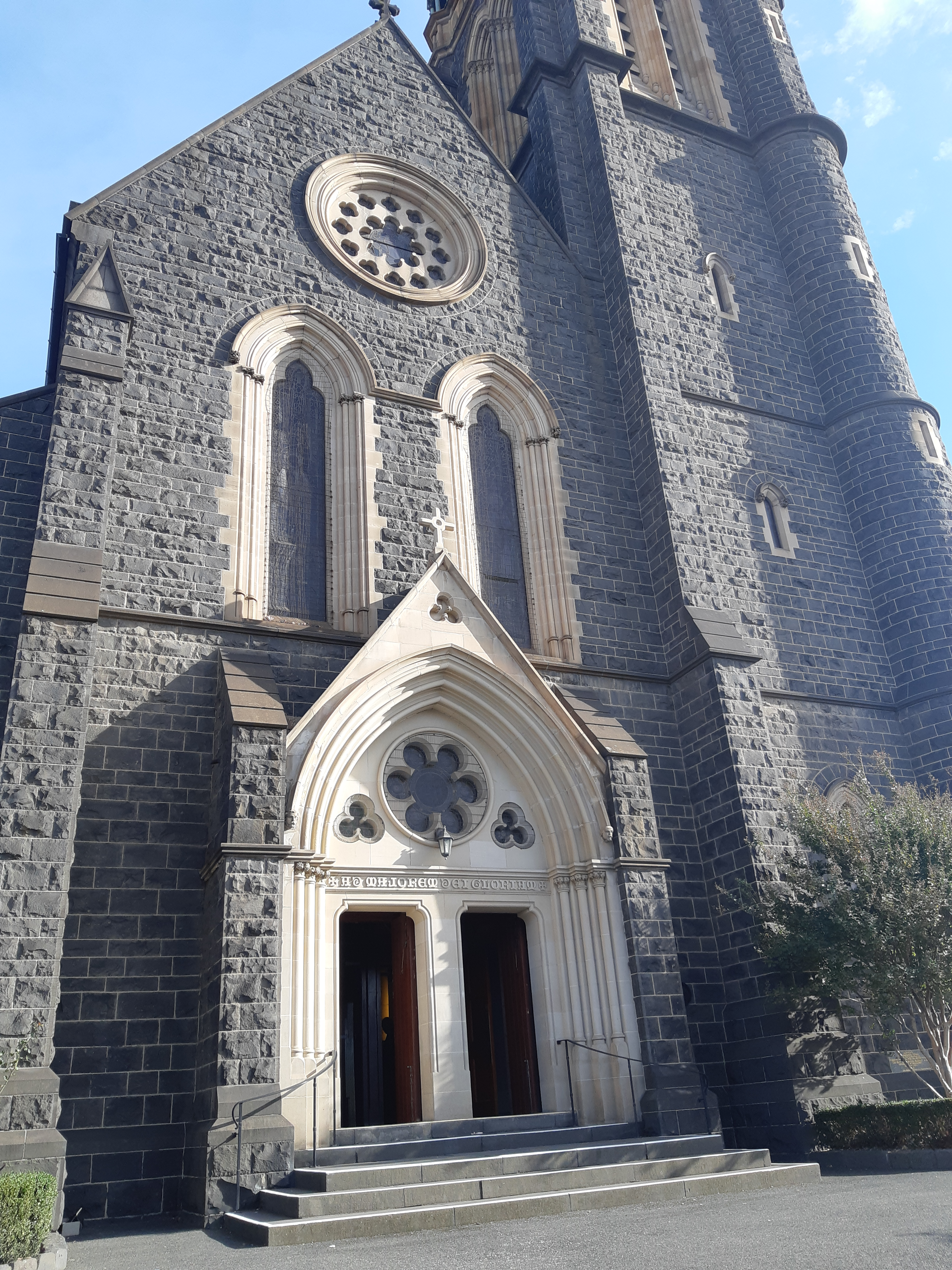
Entrance to the church

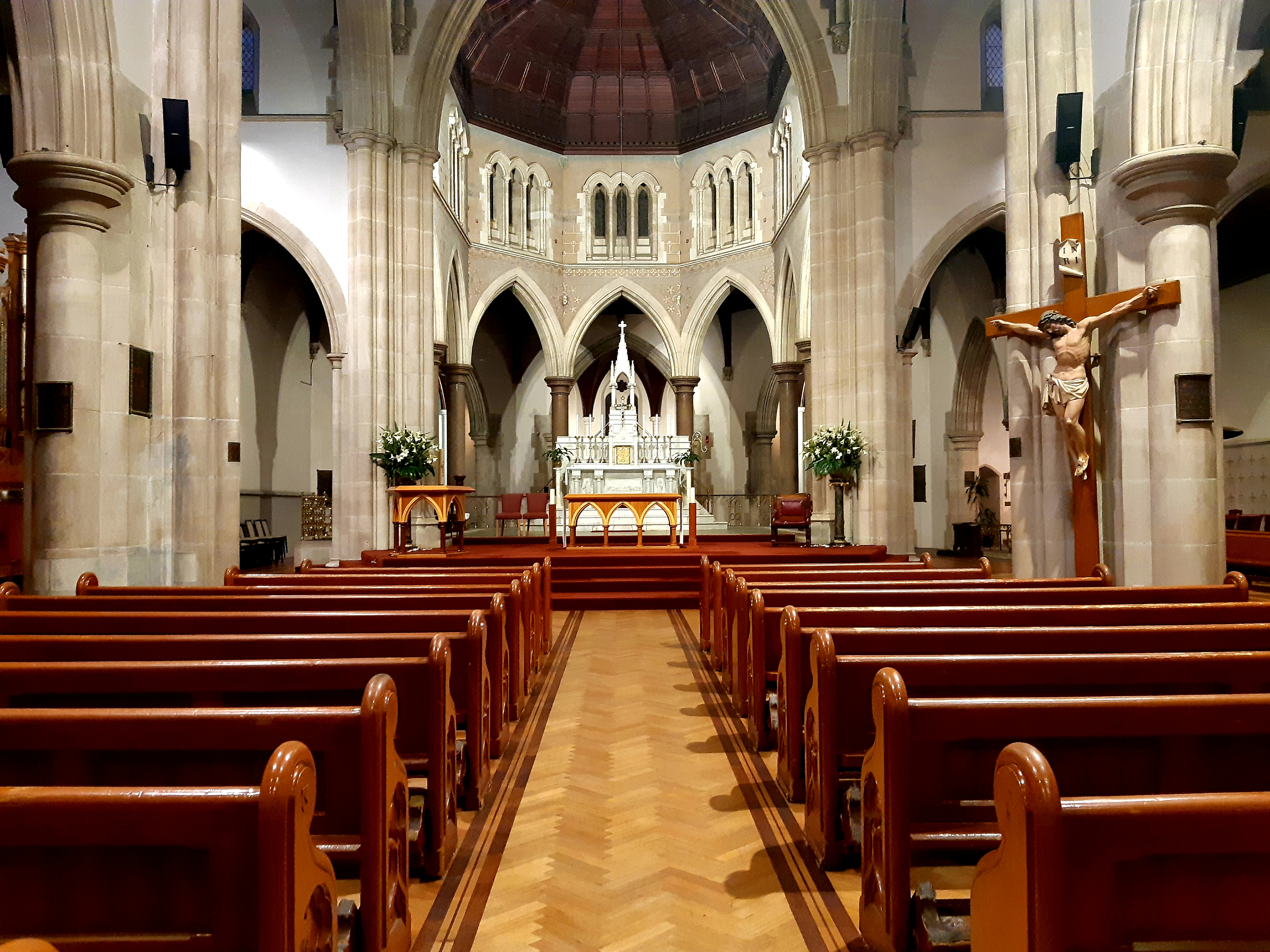
Inner view of the church

== See also ==
- Society of Jesus
