= Leighton Marshalling Yard =

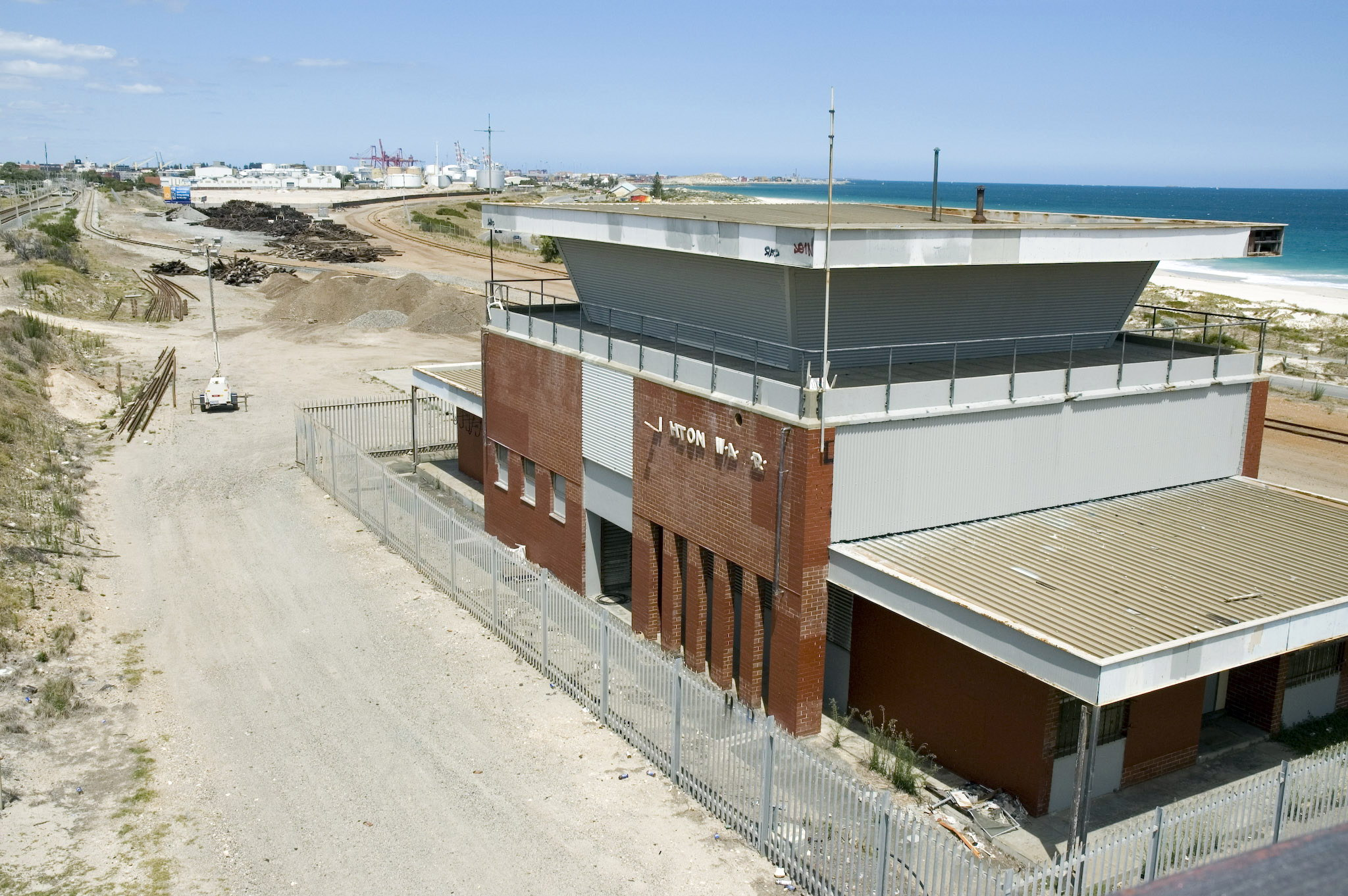
- The former control tower
- Interactive map of Leighton Marshalling Yard

Location
- Location: North Fremantle, Western Australia

Characteristics
- Owner: Westrail
- Operator: Westrail
- Type: Freight

History
- Opened: 1961
- Closed: 1998

Leighton Marshalling Yard was a railway yard in North Fremantle, Western Australia adjacent to the Eastern Railway.

== History ==
As part of plans to expand Fremantle Harbour, in 1954 the Government of Western Australia announced plans to build a new marshalling yard to replace a yard at Fremantle North Wharf. It opened in 1961 with a freight classification yard and terminal, two classification yards and 60 lever signal box. In 1966, the yard was converted to dual gauge as part of the conversion of the line from Kalgoorlie. In 1967 lighting towers were installed.

In 1986, the American Broadcasting Company installed receiving and transmitting equipment to the top of the lighting towers for its 1987 America's Cup coverage. With altered traffic arrangements having resulted in dwindling traffic, work began in September 1988 to reduce the size of the yard.

After the transfer of CBH Group's grain handling facility to Forrestfield in 1998, the yard was closed and the 17 hectare site was rezoned for urban redevelopment. In May 1999, a Multiplex led consortium was selected to redevelop the site with four hectares to be for housing and 13 hectares as a coastal reserve.
