= Cremorne, Victoria =

Cremorne
- Suburb
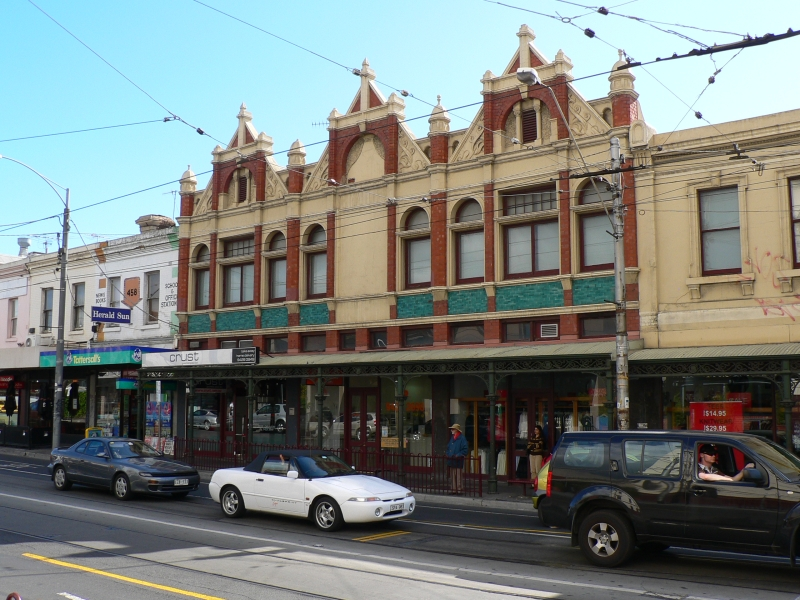
- Commercial shopfronts along Church Street

- Interactive map of Cremorne
- Coordinates: 37.830°S 144.993°E
- Country: Australia
- State: Victoria
- City: Melbourne
- LGA: City of Yarra
- Location: 2 km (1.2 mi) from Melbourne
- Established: 10 December 1853

Government
  - State electorate: Richmond
  - Federal division: Melbourne

Area
  - Total: 0.7 km^{2} (0.27 sq mi)
- Elevation: 13 m (43 ft)

Population
  - Total: 2,158 (2021 census)
  - Density: 3,080/km^{2} (8,000/sq mi)
- Postcode: 3121
Suburbs around Cremorne
East Melbourne	Richmond	Richmond
Melbourne CBD	Cremorne	Richmond
South Yarra	South Yarra	South Yarra

Cremorne is an inner-city suburb in Melbourne, Victoria, Australia, 3 km (1.9 mi) south-east of the Melbourne central business district, located within the City of Yarra local government area. Cremorne recorded a population of 2,158 at the 2021 census.

It is bounded by the Yarra River, Punt Road, Swan and Church Streets, and divided down the middle by the railway to South Yarra. Covering only about a square kilometre, until 1999 Cremorne existed only as a locality in the larger suburb of Richmond. Cremorne's built environment comprises a chaotic mix of uses, a result of being 'walled in' by main roads and railways on all sides. There are industrial icons such as Bryant and May and Rosella factories, and the Nylex Clock, side by side with Victorian cottages, modern townhouses, offices and light industries.

Cremorne takes its name from the Cremorne Gardens, an amusement park which occupied a riverfront location in the western half of Cremorne for a period in the mid 19th century.

== History ==
Cremorne was named after the Cremorne Gardens in London, a popular pleasure ground in England, which derived its name from the Old Irish words Crích Mugdornd (modern Irish: Críoch Mhúrn), meaning 'boundary' or 'chieftain' of Mugdornd. Cremorne, the Anglicisation of the Gaelic name Críoch Mhúrn, roughly meaning the 'Bounds of Mourne', was a barony in County Monaghan from which an Irish peer, The 1st Viscount Cremorne, took his title. Lord Cremorne gave his name to his London residence in what became the Cremorne Gardens. Other sources claim that rather than referring to a Chieftain, it refers to the territorial area of an ancient tribal group in County Monaghan.

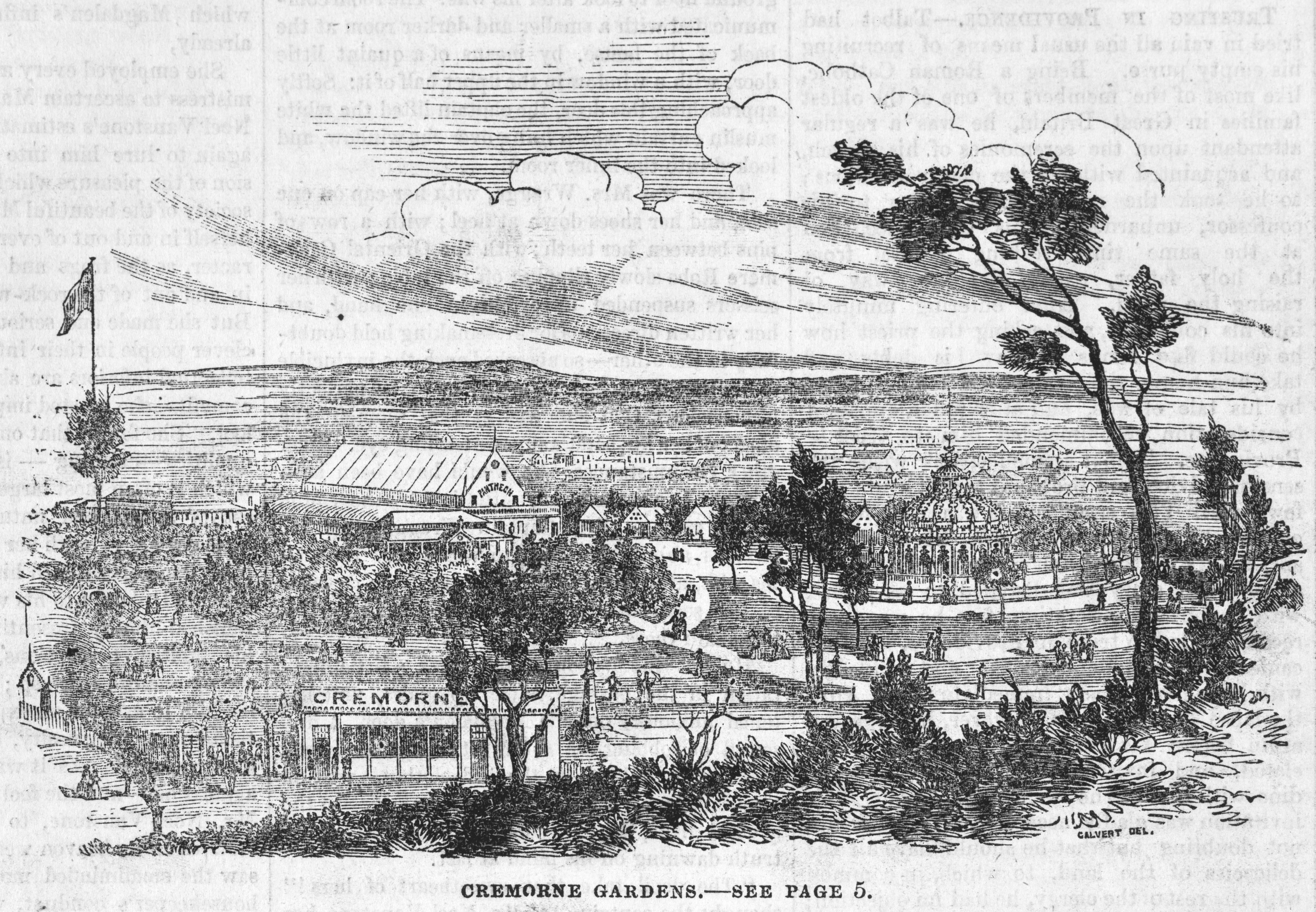
Lithograph of Cremorne Gardens in 1862

Cremorne was established as six allotments of crown land in 1839 only 5 years after the subdivision of Melbourne's CBD by John Batman. Originally it was used for farming estates, with large villas reminiscent of English estates. It was subdivided in linear strips running from Swan Street (leading to the CBD's then fishmarket) to the Yarra River. and Cremorne Gardens occupied a river-front location in the western half of Cremorne for a brief period in the mid 19th century. They were established in 1853 by James Ellis (9 January 1874 - d. circa 1876), who had earlier managed gardens of the same name on the banks of the Thames, at Chelsea, in London. Entrepreneur George Coppin later acquired and expanded the Gardens which became a major Melbourne attraction at the time, with patrons arriving by train or boat to see wild animals, dancers and other entertainment. However the Gardens closed in 1863 and the land was sold for housing and an asylum.

Although Cremorne was a largely residential area in its early history, the banks of the Yarra became home to many so-called noxious industries, such as tanneries and soap makers, as well as the Richmond Power Station, which opened in 1891. In the 20th century Cremorne became increasingly industrial. Large manufacturing complexes were built, including the Bryant and May and Rosella factories. In the mid 20th century light industry flooded into the area, with the construction of hundreds of small to medium-sizes factories which were occupied by the rag trade, mechanics, printers and small engineering businesses.

The residential areas increasingly became slums, and some parts were threatened with clearance. Well-known Melbourne criminal Dennis Allen owned about a dozen homes in Cremorne, which were used for a variety of illicit purposes. One was demolished in 1989 by police searching for evidence in the Walsh Street police shootings. It had earlier been seized by the Australian Taxation Office. Other shadowy businesses in Cremorne Street in the 1970s included a brothel, a door-to-door business selling fraudulent oil paintings, and clothing sweatshops.

Things started to change in the 1990s however. The inner city became a desirable residential location again and large industries found it uneconomic to operate in inner urban areas. The Richmond Power Station, and the Bryant and May and Rosella factories, were all converted to office space. Businesses such as Just Jeans, Country Road, Mattel and John Wiley & Sons established offices in the suburb. The small Victorian terraces and cottages which abound in Cremorne were snapped up in a renovation boom. Cremorne is now a mixture of period and modern housing, offices, art galleries, bars, and a diminishing light industrial sector. Currently Cremorne has been coined as 'Australian Silicon Valley' due to a concentration of tech industries such as Seek, Disney and Carsales in the precinct.

== Population ==
In the 2016 census, there were 2,018 people in Cremorne. 69.3% of people were born in Australia and 81.4% of people spoke only English at home. The most common responses for religion were No Religion, so described 50.0% and Catholic 17.9%.

== Streets of Cremorne ==
Swan Street is one of Melbourne's most popular shopping strips. Once famous for the Dimmeys department store, full of discounted seconds and distressed stock, which is now being redeveloped as an apartment complex, it also has an eclectic collection of restaurants and clearance shops. The street also features some fine examples of Edwardian and Victorian architecture. A period of renewal since the early 2000s has seen an influx of cafes and restaurants as well as modern residential apartment development along the strip.

Punt Road is the major north–south link in inner Melbourne and is busy 24 hours a day. Church Street is lined with furniture showrooms.

== Transport ==
From December 1859 until about 1864, there was a railway station called Cremorne, just north of Balmain Street, on the Melbourne & Suburban Railway Company's line to Windsor. The station provided access to the adjacent Cremorne Gardens. The Windsor line has since been extended as far as Sandringham.

The junction of the two busiest groups of railway lines in Melbourne is in Cremorne. The lines form an east–west barrier through the area and also cut it off from Richmond to the north. Cremorne has one railway station within its boundaries, East Richmond. Trains on the Lilydale, Belgrave, Glen Waverley, and Alamein lines pass through East Richmond, heading towards the eastern suburbs, but many of them do not stop there. Richmond station is slightly to the north of Cremorne, and is one of Melbourne's busiest outside the central business district.

Both Swan and Church Streets have regular tram services.

On the southern border of Cremorne is the Monash Freeway, which makes the Yarra River virtually inaccessible. The suburb is connected to South Yarra by three bridges: the Punt Road Bridge, the Cremorne Railway Bridge and the Church Street Bridge. Freeway exits at Church Street and Punt Road are particularly busy. Balmain Street and Cremorne Street are the main thoroughfares in the suburb, which is characterised by several narrow one-way streets.

== See also ==
- City of Richmond – Cremorne was previously within this former local government area.
