= Richmond, Victoria =

Richmond
- Suburb
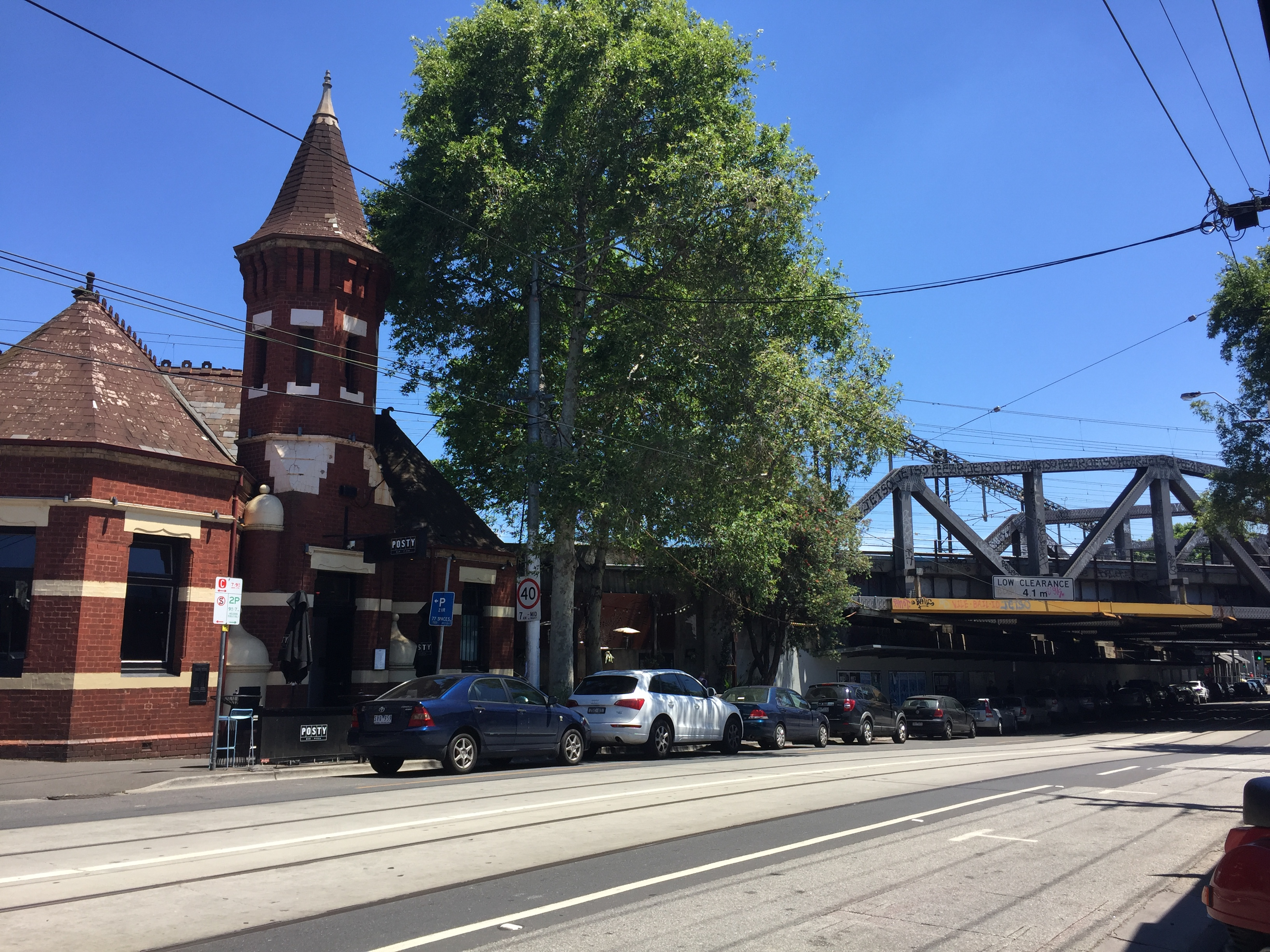
- Swan Street with the Swan Street Rail Bridge to the right

- Interactive map of Richmond
- Coordinates: 37.823°S 144.998°E
- Country: Australia
- State: Victoria
- City: Melbourne
- LGA: City of Yarra
- Location: 3 km (1.9 mi) from Melbourne
- Established: 19th century

Government
  - State electorate: Richmond
  - Federal division: Melbourne

Area
  - Total: 3.8 km^{2} (1.5 sq mi)
- Elevation: 18 m (59 ft)

Population
  - Total: 28,587 (SAL 2021)
- Postcode: 3121
Suburbs around Richmond
Collingwood	Abbotsford	Kew
East Melbourne	Richmond	Hawthorn
Cremorne	South Yarra	Burnley

Richmond is an inner-city suburb in Melbourne, Victoria, Australia, 3 km (1.9 mi) east of the Melbourne central business district, located within the City of Yarra local government area. Richmond recorded a population of 28,587 at the 2021 census, with a median age of 34.

Alfred Howitt recorded the Kulin/Woiwurrung name for Richmond as Quo-yung with the possible meaning of 'dead trees'.

Three of the 82 designated major activity centres identified in the Melbourne 2030 Metropolitan Strategy are located in Richmond—the commercial strips of Victoria Street, Bridge Road and Swan Street.

The suburb has been the subject of gentrification since the early 1990s and now contains a mix of converted warehouse residences, public housing high-rise flats and terrace houses from the Victorian-era. The residential segment of the suburb exists among a lively retail sector. Richmond was home to the Nine Network studios, under the callsign of GTV-9, until the studios moved to Docklands in 2011. Dimmeys is long associated with Richmond, although it is located in the neighbouring suburb of Cremorne. The suburb is well known for its factory outlets along Bridge Road, remaining an attraction to the area.

Richmond is well known for Little Saigon along Victoria Street; however, the area is also recognised for illicit drug dealing (especially heroin) that occurs in both street-based and domestic contexts.

The Richmond District in San Francisco (the area north of Golden Gate Park) was named after Richmond, Victoria, Australia. The designer of the Park's Japanese Tea Garden was from Melbourne and bought land in the yet-undeveloped area and named after the then posh suburb of his hometown.

== Landmarks and built environment ==
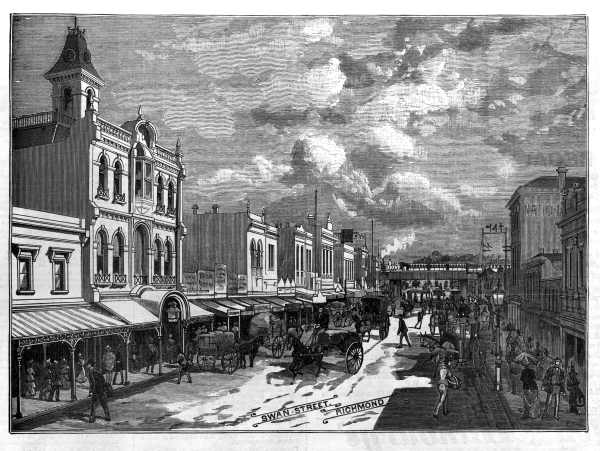
Swan Street scene in 1889

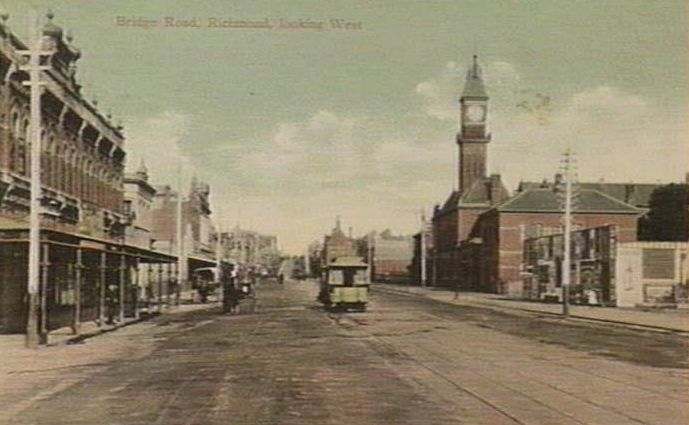
Bridge Road in 1908 looking West towards Melbourne

=== Commercial and government ===
Richmond Trader’s Centre is a local shopping centre below an apartment block. Victoria Gardens Shopping Centre is a large modern complex built in 2001 to service the inner eastern suburbs.

The Loyal Studley Hotel was built in 1891 and is now used as a homewares shop. Richmond Power Station was built in 1891. The Burnley Theatre is now a commercial homewares shop, but contains some elements of the original interiors, including the foyer and stage. 450 Swan Street, completed in 1995, combines an old bank and modern building and is an example of deconstructivist architecture. Richmond Town Hall is a landmark building currently operated by the City of Yarra, which was built in the 1880s and redecorated during the interwar years. Hotels include the Mountain View Hotel, Corner Hotel, The Spread Eagle Hotel, the Rising Sun and the Swan (1890) and many others known for their live music.

=== Housing ===
With a large number of small homes in its narrow streets, Richmond has some of Melbourne's best examples of residential architecture from most periods. The majority of houses in Richmond are the single fronted Victorian style houses built from the 1850s to 1930s. Typically these houses are long thin blocks with two bedrooms at the front and family room/kitchen at the back. Traditionally the toilet or outhouse was situated at the back of the property outside.

Notable examples include The Malthouse, a landmark conversion of silos into apartments by award-winning architect Nonda Katsalidis.

The bluestone terrace homes at 13 & 15 James Street, built in 1857 in the rustic Gothic style for Eneas Mackenzie, a civil servant, are classified by the National Trust and are among the oldest homes remaining in Melbourne.

Lalor House on Church Street, named after and former home of Eureka Stockade upriser Peter Lalor, is a rich boom-style landmark.

=== Gallery ===
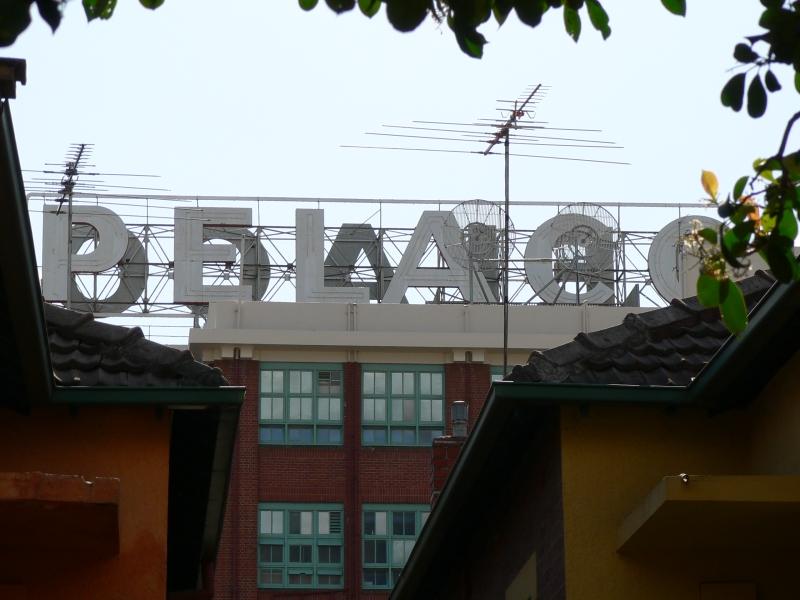
View of the Pelaco factory between two art deco period houses

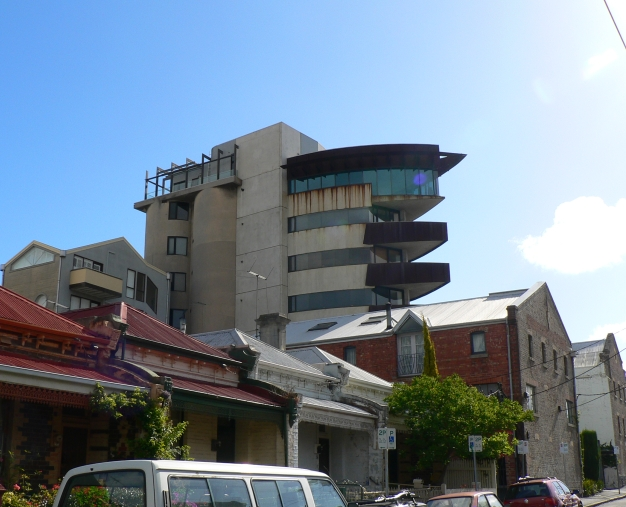
Abinger Street looking west shows a diversity of housing styles including the Malthouse – industrial silos converted into contemporary apartments.

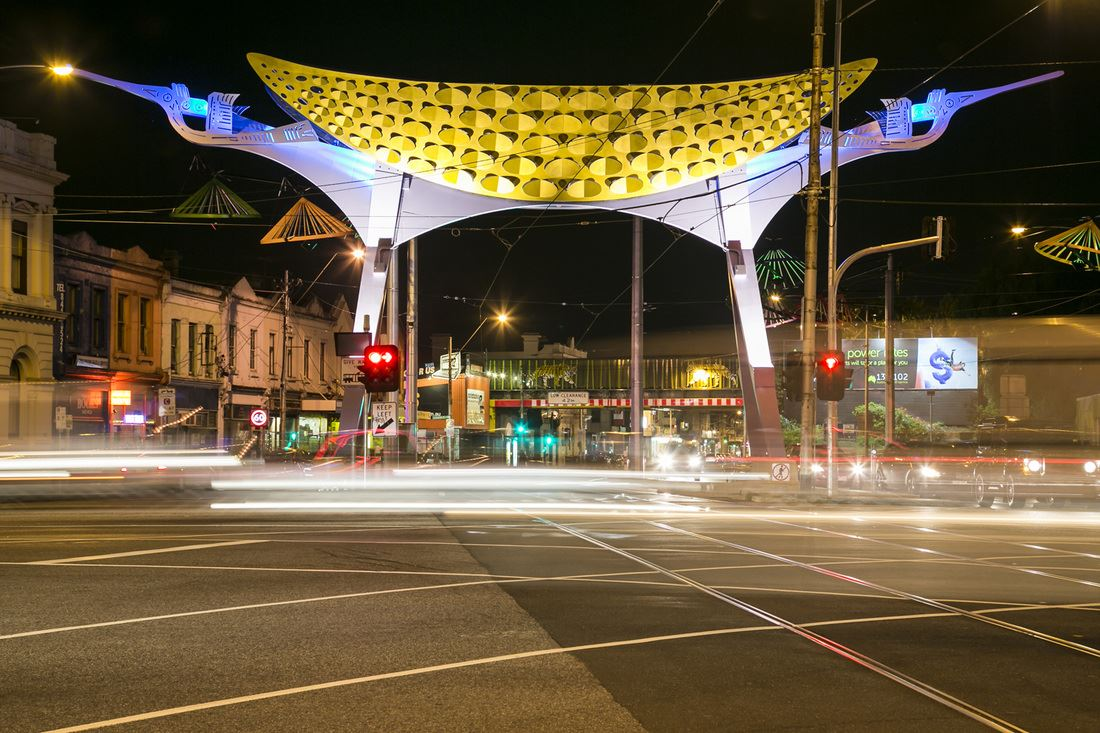
The Victoria Street Gateway erected to recognise the cultural contribution of Vietnamese refugees

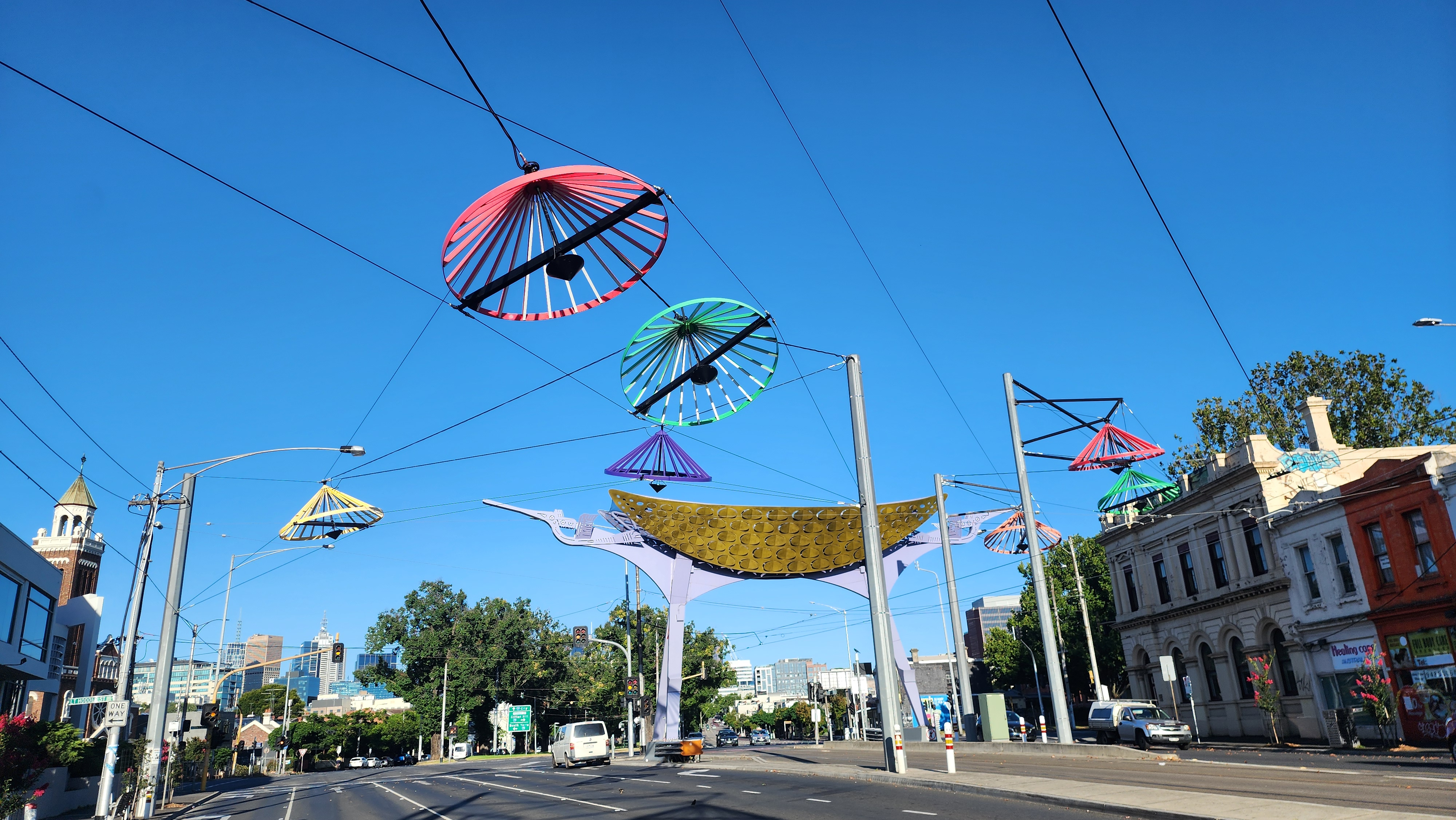
The Victoria Street Gateway

=== Industry ===
From the mid-19th century, Richmond was a centre of manufacturing industry, including many large complexes such as the Bryant & May match factory, Jaques Limited engineering works, the Wertheim Piano factory and Pelaco.

=== Public space ===
Richmond has several of public space to cater for its dense population. The largest park is Burnley Park. Other notable spaces include Citizens Park, bordering on Church and Highett Streets, Barkly Gardens and the Allen Bain Reserve, as well as a number of smaller parks and reserves.

Other large parks are located in nearby suburbs, including Yarra Park and Melbourne Park in East Melbourne (Jolimont), the Golden Square Bicentennial Park, Burnley Park and oval, the Burnley Golf Course (survey paddock) and a number of sport reserves and ovals in neighbouring Burnley. Pridmore Park, Yarra Bank Reserve, Creswick Street Reserve and St James Park are in Hawthorn, Dickinsons Reserve, Yarra Bend Park, Studley Park Golf Course and Studley Park are in Kew.

== Demographics ==
Historical population
Year	Pop.	±%
1971	28,341	—
2001	19,391	−31.6%
2006	22,475	+15.9%
2011	23,814	+6.0%
2016	27,705	+16.3%
2021	28,587	+3.2%

At the 2016 census Richmond had a population of 27,705. The most common ancestries in Richmond were English 22.6%, Australian 15.8%, Irish 10.4%, Scottish 7.2% and Chinese 5.8%. 60.0% of people were born in Australia. The most common other countries of birth were Vietnam 5.0%, England 3.7%, New Zealand 3.1%, China 2.0% and Greece 2.0%. 66.0% of people only spoke English at home. Other languages spoken at home included Vietnamese 6.6%, Greek 4.0%, Mandarin 2.4%, Cantonese 1.7% and Hakka 1.2%. The most common responses for religion were No Religion 44.2% and Catholic 18.3%.

== Religion ==
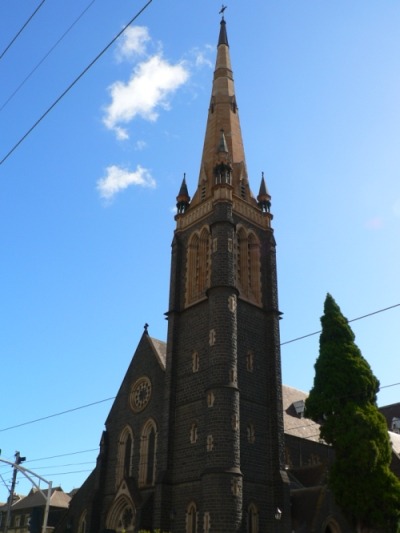
St Ignatius' Church on Church Street

Many religious groups exist in Richmond. The local large Catholic community is served by St Ignatius' Church on Church Street and St James Parish. Anglicans also have a presence in Richmond with two parishes, the oldest is St Stephens (1851) and is at 360 Church Street, next door to St Ignatius' Church; the second parish is St Bartholomew's (1885) located at 290 Burnley Street. A Uniting Church also serves its members with a Fijian presence, located on Church Street, and another in Burnley Street.

Due to a large amount of Greek Immigration in Australia there is a Greek Orthodox Church, located on Burnley Street, which is open for the Divine Liturgy every Sunday and brings together Richmond's Greek Community.

There is also a large Assemblies of God Church, Richmond AOG, in Griffiths Street.

== Sport ==
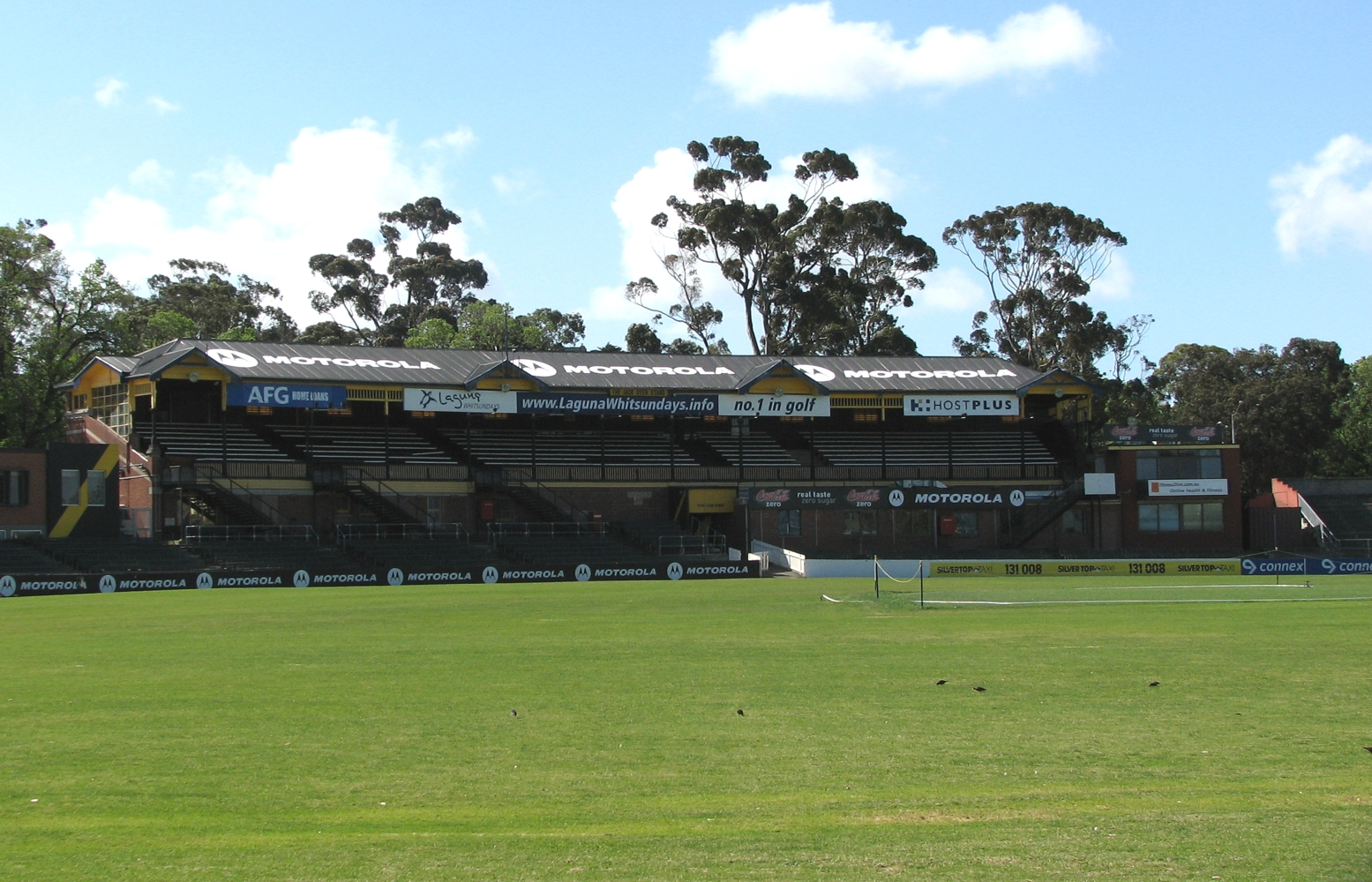
Punt Road Oval, home of the Richmond Football Club

Richmond is home to the Richmond Football Club, an Australian rules football club, which is a member of the Australian Football League. The club has a cult following not only in Richmond, but throughout the eastern suburbs of Melbourne. Richmond are one of the biggest clubs in the AFL, with over 105,000 members in 2022 and have won 13 premierships, the latest being 2020.

The Tigers play the majority of their home games at the Melbourne Cricket Ground (MCG), which is just outside the suburb's border, and regularly attract crowds in excess of 50,000; however, can draw as large as 90,000 against fierce rivals. The team trains and runs their administration from their spiritual home ground, Punt Road Oval (adjacent to the MCG). Although the club have not played home games at the Punt Road Oval since the end of the 1964 season, the Richmond Football Club have rebuilt a new social club and training facility at the Punt Road Oval. The club have played their home games at the neighbouring Melbourne Cricket Ground (MCG) since 1965.

Richmond is home to Richmond Harriers Athletic Club, who compete in Athletics Victoria sanctioned competition in track and field, road running and cross-country running. The club was founded in 1913 and celebrated its centenary year in 2013. The club is located at Citizen's Park, at the corner of Highett Street and Gleadell Street.

Richmond is also home to local cricket teams. It is home to the Richmond Cricket Club who compete in the Victorian Premier Cricket competition, the highest-level club cricket competition in the state of Victoria. It is also home to Richmond City Cricket Club and Richmond Union Cricket Club; to which both compete in the Eastern Cricket Association (ECA).

== Schools ==
- Richmond High School
- Melbourne Girls' College
- St Kevin's College (Waterford Campus)
- Bindjiroo Yaluk Community School

== Transport ==
Richmond has an established transport system involving arterial roads, five railway stations, seven tram routes, a bus route and a series of bicycle trails, including the Capital City Trail and the Yarra River Trail.

Richmond is served by tram routes 12 and 109, on Victoria Street, 78 on Church Street, 48 and 75 on Bridge Road and 70 on Swan Street.

The main train station in Richmond is Richmond railway station. It is an interchange for all metropolitan passenger trains to the eastern and south-eastern suburbs. Railway lines that travel through Richmond station include the Pakenham, Cranbourne, Frankston, Lilydale, Belgrave, Glen Waverley, Sandringham and Alamein lines. Other train stations in Richmond include North Richmond and West Richmond, both located on the Hurstbridge and Mernda lines. East Richmond is also located on the boundary of Richmond and Cremorne.

== Health ==
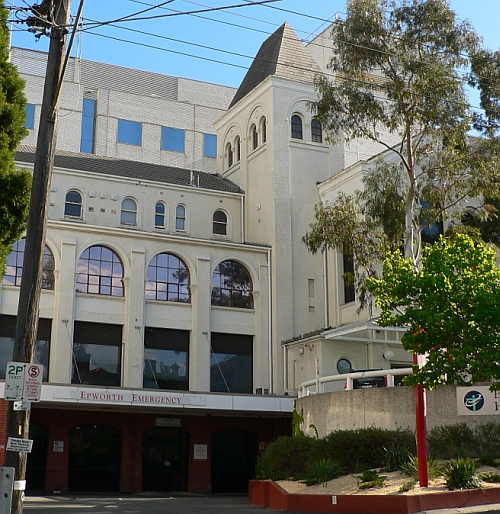
Epworth HealthCare

Epworth Hospital (private) is a major surgical hospital. It has a major campus in Richmond fronting both Bridge Road and Erin Street.

The Melbourne Clinic (private) is a major psychiatric facility on Church Street.

Access Health and Community is a major primary health service at 283 Church Street and was founded in 1868 as the Richmond Dispensary, making it possibly the oldest continuously running GP practice and community health centre in Australia. Sir Robert Menzies, a former Australian Prime Minister, on retiring from the Commonwealth Parliament was the head of the fund raising committee for the current building which was opened in 1978.

== Richmond in popular culture ==
- The cult punk film Dogs in Space (1986) directed by Richard Lowenstein and starring Michael Hutchence was filmed in Richmond.
- In Loaded, the 1995 novel by Christos Tsiolkas, the Greek Australian protagonist, Ari, lives in Richmond with his family.
- Songwriter Paul Kelly's song 'Leaps and Bounds' mentions Richmond's 'clock on the silo', otherwise known as the Nylex Clock.
- Ron Barassi formerly owned The Mountain View Hotel.
- Renovation Challenge: The Block was filmed in four dilapidated houses on Cameron Street.

== Notable people ==
- Dennis Allen
- Don Battye
- Peter Brock
- Roger Dean - Richmond Football Club premiership captain, born and raised in Richmond.
- Louisa Margaret Dunkley
- Megan Gale
- Bronwyn Halfpenny
- Marieke Hardy
- Paul Hawkins
- Stan Keon
- Norman Lacy
- Peter Lalor - Irish-born leader of the Eureka Rebellion, died in Richmond
- Andy Lee
- Rove McManus
- Dame Nellie Melba – born in Richmond in 1861
- Molly Meldrum
- David Mitchell
- Darcy Moore
- Van Tuong Nguyen
- Frank Scully
- Billy Slater
- Squizzy Taylor

== See also ==
- City of Richmond – Richmond was previously within this former local government area.
