= North Fremantle =

- Suburb
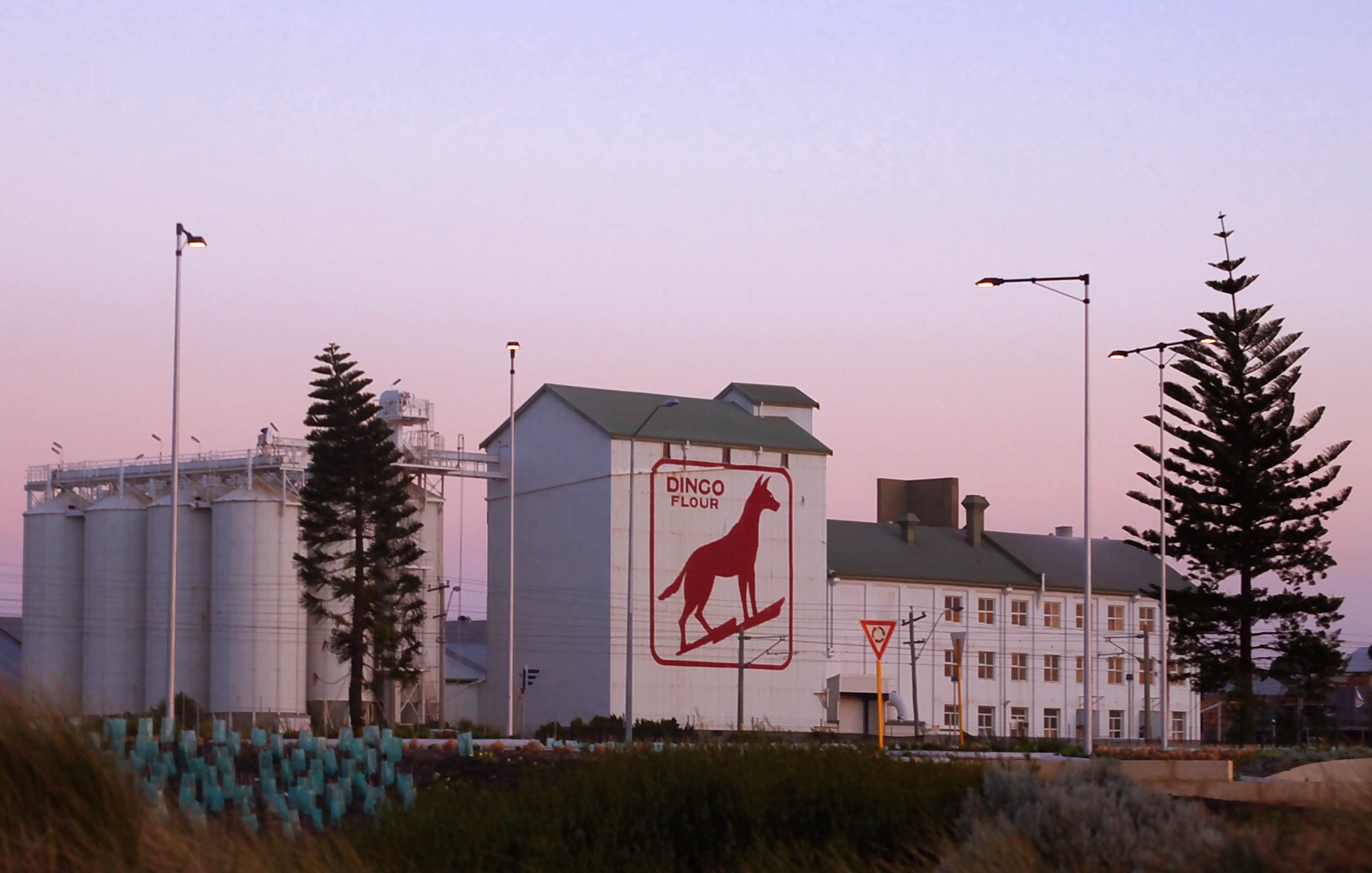
- Dingo Flour Mill
- Interactive map of North Fremantle
- Coordinates: 32.034°S 115.756°E
- Country: Australia
- State: Western Australia
- City: Perth
- LGA: City of Fremantle
- Location: 15 km (9.3 mi) SW of the Perth CBD; 3 km (1.9 mi) N of Fremantle
- Established: 1851

Government
  - State electorate: Cottesloe
  - Federal division: Fremantle
- Elevation: 35 m (115 ft)

Population
  - Total: 3,947 (SAL 2021)
- Time zone: Australian Western Standard Time (AWST +8)
- Postcode: 6159
- Annual rainfall: 588 mm (23.1 in)
Suburbs around North Fremantle
Indian Ocean	Mosman Park	Mosman Park
Indian Ocean	North Fremantle	East Fremantle
Fremantle	Fremantle	East Fremantle

North Fremantle is a suburb of Perth, Western Australia, located within the City of Fremantle, a local government area of the state. Its postcode is 6159.

North Fremantle is situated on a peninsula, with the Indian Ocean bounding the west side and the Swan River the east side. On the north side it is separated from the suburb of Mosman Park by McCabe Street. North Fremantle has one railway station, located on Stirling Highway, which provides train services into Fremantle and Perth city. There are various bus stations in North Fremantle, providing access to outer Perth suburbs.

== History ==
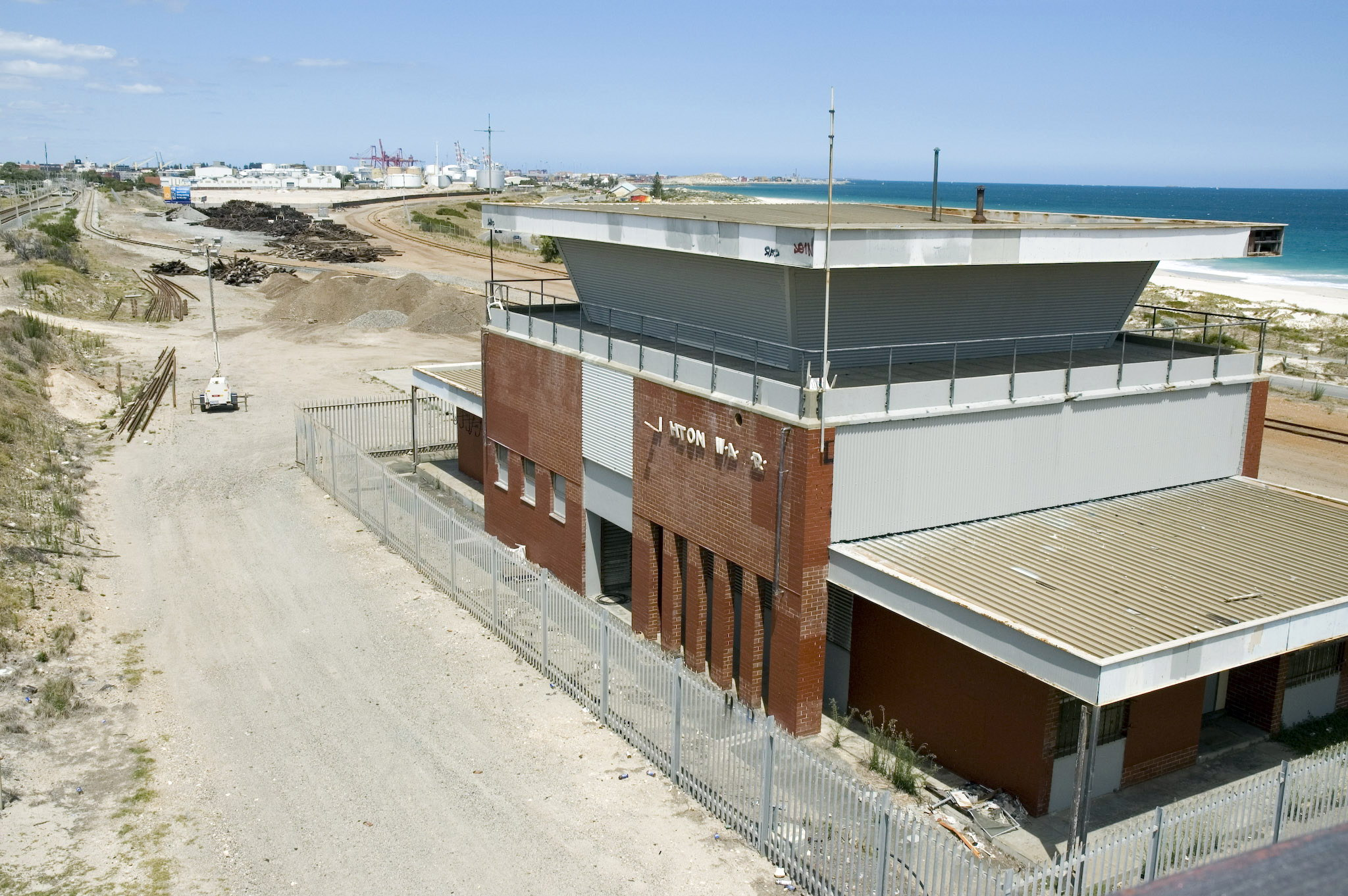
Former Leighton Marshalling Yard control tower

The primary impetus for the early development of North Fremantle was the arrival of convicts, and pensioner guards in 1850. Pensioner guards were granted land in North Fremantle. In 1851 John Bruce was granted 61 hectares (150 acres) of land and founded the town on it. The land was surveyed and divided between other pensioner guards. By 1862, over 20 cottages had been constructed. With this construction came the arrival of new convicts, and to accommodate them roadworks were constructed, such as the first Fremantle traffic bridge.

North Fremantle became an independent municipality in 1895. The municipality reunited with the City of Fremantle by an order of the Governor in Executive Council as from 1 November 1961.

== Marshalling yards ==
The suburb was once the site of Western Australian Government Railways' Leighton Marshalling Yard, which linked the North Fremantle industrial area and North Quay. They were developed in the 1950s.

The area has undergone significant redevelopment by the state government.

== Recreation ==
North Fremantle is home to River Beach, Leighton Beach and Port Beach. North Fremantle has seen an increase of locally owned business along Stirling Highway including various cafes, restaurants and bars. The area's strong afternoon sea breeze (known as the Fremantle Doctor) makes its ocean beaches a prime location for wind and kite surfing. The Fremantle Surf Life Saving Club has been active since the 1930s.
