= DB Class E 410 =

German electric locomotive

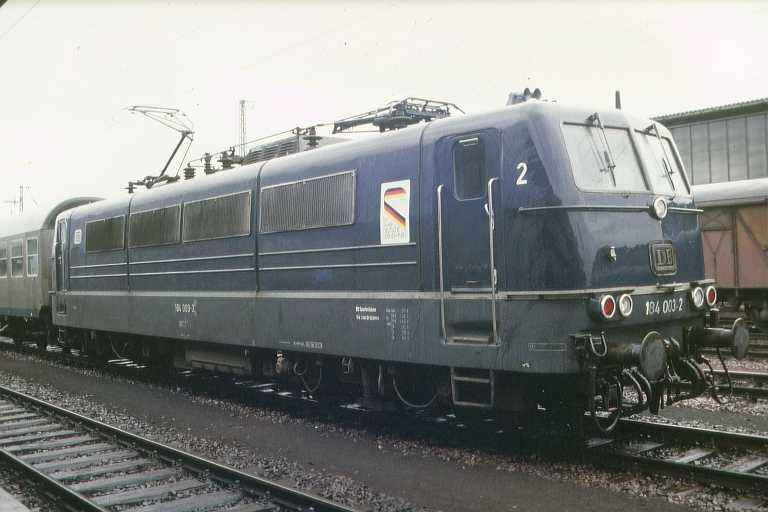
Type and origin
- Power type: Electric
- Builder: Krupp, AEG, BBC
- Build date: 1966-1967
- Total produced: 5
Specifications
- Configuration
  - UIC: Bo′Bo′
- Gauge: 1435 mm
- Wheel diameter: 1250 mm
- Wheelbase
  - Bogie: 3100 mm
- Length: 16950 mm
- Loco weight: 84000 kg
- Electric system/s: 15 kV~ 16 2/3 Hz, 25 kV~ 50 Hz, 1.5 kV= and 3 kV=
- Gear ratio: 32:101
Performance figures
- Maximum speed: 150 km/h
- Power output
  - 1 hour: 3240 kW
  - Continuous: 3000 kW
- Tractive effort: 275 kN

The DB Class E 410 locomotive of the German Federal Railways (DB), also known as DB Class 184, was one of the first four-current electric locomotives (Note: Multi-system vehicles, i.e., rolling stock capable of operating on railway networks with different electrification systems, are divided into the following types: "dual voltage," capable of operating with current of the same nature (direct or alternating) at two different voltages (for example: dual voltage locomotive at 1.5 and 3 kV=, dual voltage locomotive at 16 and 25 kV 50 Hz); "bifrequency", suitable for operating with alternating current at two different frequencies (for example: 15 kV 16 2/3 Hz bifrequency locomotive and 25 kV 50 Hz); "bi-current", capable of operating indifferently with direct current at a given voltage or alternating current at a given voltage and frequency (for example: bi-current locomotive at 1.5 kV= and 25 kV 50 Hz); "polycurrent," capable of operating indifferently with direct current at different voltages and alternating current at different voltages and frequencies. This includes the vehicles: "three-current" (for example: three-current locomotive at 1.5 kV=, 3 kV= and 25 kV 50 Hz); "four-current" (for example: four-current locomotive at 1.5 kV=, 3 kV=, 15 kV 16 2/3 Hz and 25 kV 50 Hz).; Cf Machefert-Tassin, I diversi, n. 2, pp. 175-180.)) provided for international services from Germany to France, Belgium, Luxembourg and the Netherlands.

Since those rail networks used different electrification systems from the one adopted by German railways, in order to eliminate the downtime generated by the need for traction unit changes at borders the DB central offices (Note: BZA: abbreviation for Bundesbahn-ZentralÄmter (central offices of the federal railways).) in Munich, in cooperation with the German railway industry, built five prototype four-current locomotives all equipped with Krupp mechanical parts.

Of them, three were built with an electronically driven traction circuit made by Allgemeine Elektricitäts-Gesellschaft (AEG) and two with a conventionally driven circuit made by Brown Boveri & Cie (BBC).

The units designed and built by AEG, for the first time in the history of machines intended to cross "electric frontiers," were equipped with thyristor electronic converter electrical equipment.

The locomotives were delivered between 1966 and 1967 forming the E 410 group, renamed 184 under the new unified classification adopted by DB in 1968. Nicknamed "Europa-Lok," they underwent extensive trials, in Germany and on the networks of other European countries including Italy, and were then used on various domestic and international routes (including those of some Trans Europ Express trains) until the end of the twentieth century.

== Background ==
In the early 1960s, the development of power electronics, and in particular thyristors, also known as "silicon controlled diodes" or SCRs, (Note: SCR: stands for Silicon Controlled Rectifier) demonstrated the possibility of overcoming the space and mass problems that had hitherto slowed the introduction of multi-system traction vehicles. (Note: The multi-system vehicles of the first generations used ignitrons or excitrons as rectifiers. Cf Ugo Cantutti, Il treno, in Il mondo della tecnica, under the direction of Gustavo Colonnetti, vol. 4°, Turin, UTET, 1962, p. 31.)

Notable among the multi-system vehicles of the generation before the introduction of power electronics were the cases of the French railways (SNCF), which had locomotives powered by two, three or four types of current, and the four-current TEE electric train of the Swiss Federal Railways (SBB) RAe 1050 that regularly travelled to Paris and Milan.

== Design and construction ==
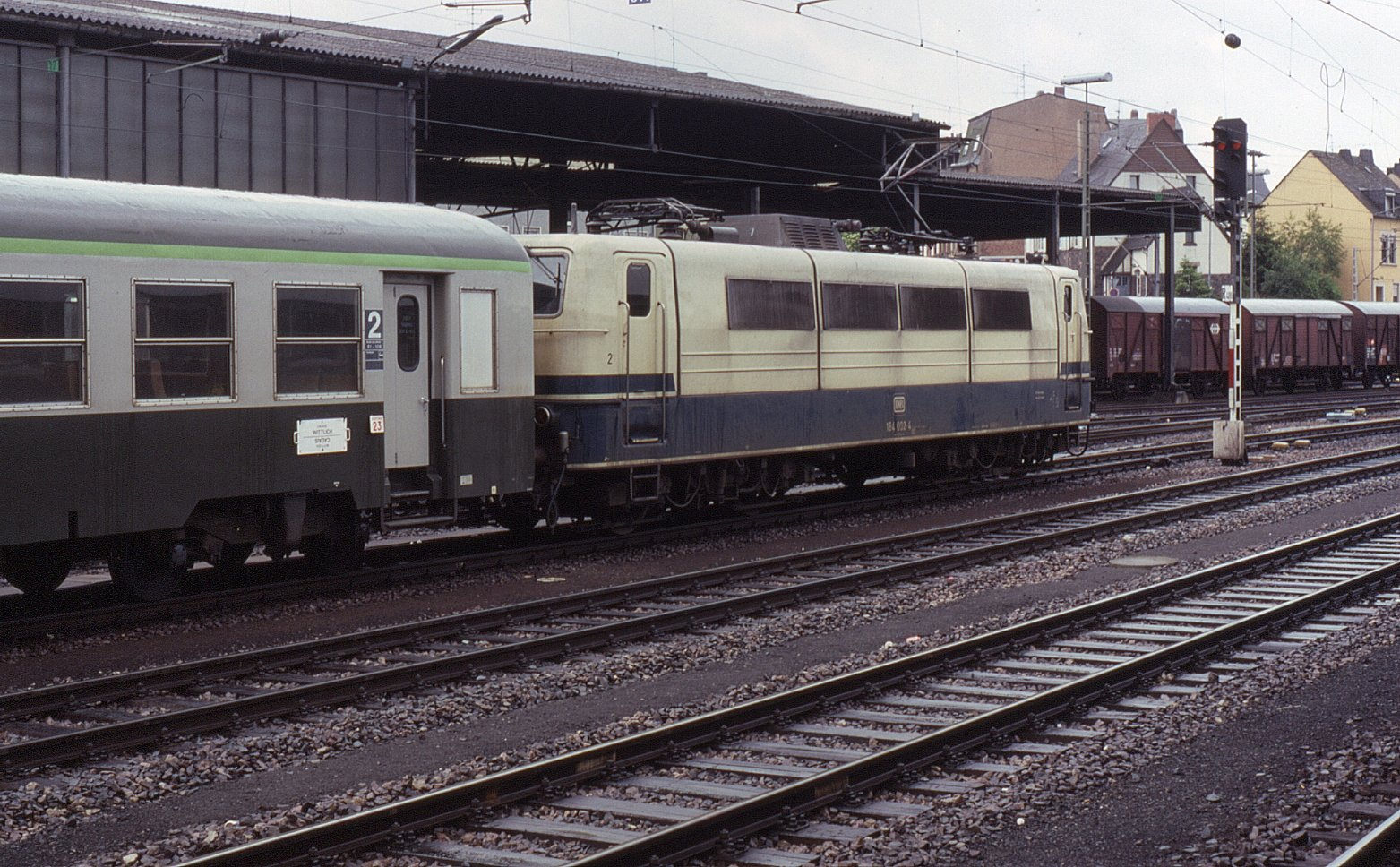
Locomotive 184 002 in the Trier Hbf station on June 10, 1991 pulling an SNCF car train bound for Wittlich, used by French servicemen serving in West Germany to return to their homes on weekends.

The E 410 electric locomotives (later Group 184) of the German Federal Railroad (DB) came into being with the aim of eliminating downtime for changing traction vehicles at the borders with the Netherlands, Belgium, Luxembourg and France, whose rail networks used different electrification systems from that adopted by the German railways.

Based on the experience gained with the three prototype bifrequency locomotives equipped with silicon rectifiers constituting the E 320 01, (Note: In 1981, locomotive 182 001 (formerly E 320 01), which had already been shelved by the DB, was granted for use to AEG-Telefunken, which mounted on it at its own expense an experimental equipment with three-phase motors that it intended to develop mainly for foreign networks with single-phase 25 kV 50 Hz power supply, but which could also be tested on the German 15 kV 16 2/3 Hz network. With the transformation, carried out by AEG in Munich Freimann, the locomotive was equipped with a bogie with two three-phase motors with a total rated power of 2 870 kW, while the original motors in the other bogie were excluded from the traction circuit. On the occasion of the conversion, 182 001 was repainted in the red, beige and pearl gray color scheme. Cf Notizie flash in I treni oggi, 2 (1981), no. 13, p. 7.) 11, and 21 groups that ran service from 1960 on the Homburg-Saarbrücken-Forbach-Metz route, electrified in Germany at 15 kV 16 2/3 Hz and in France at 25 kV 50 Hz, the DB central offices in Munich developed with German industry the design of a new family of electric multi-power locomotives that included:

- the bifrequency locomotives E 310 (later Group 181), planned to run under the 15 kV 16 2/3 Hz alternating current electrified networks of German railways (DB) and 25 kV 50 Hz of French (SNCF) and Luxembourg (CFL) railways;
- the four-current locomotives E 410, which were also planned to run under the 1.5 kV direct current electrified networks of the Dutch railways (NS) and 3 kV of the Belgian railways (SNCB).

The aforementioned locomotives were also capable of operating under the overhead catenaries of other countries where they were not expressly scheduled to run, namely the 15 kV 16 2/3 Hz alternating current electrified networks of the Swiss (SBB) and Austrian (ŐBB) railways and, limited to the E 410s, the 1.5 kV direct current electrified networks of the French (SNCF) and 3 kV electrified networks of the Italian (FS) railways.

The E 410 locomotives, which according to Bachman "essentially was to be a multi-current version of the DB's successful E10 (later BR 110) class," known as the "Europa-Lok," were ordered in 1963 and built between 1966 and 1967 in five examples with the mechanical part made by Krupp and the electrical equipment supplied by Allgemeine Elektrizitäts-Gesellschaft (AEG) and Brown, Boveri & Cie (BBC). These locomotives, accepted by the DB between 1967 and 1968, were reclassified in 1968 into group 184.

Other goals of the project included having machines capable of providing the same performance as DB Group 110 locomotives.

In addition to the four-current locomotives E 410 001-003, Krupp and AEG produced the four prototype bifrequency locomotives E 310 001-004 in 1966, which were accepted in 1967 by the DB and reclassified in 1968 into subgroups 181.0 and 181.1.

=== Mechanical part ===
The design of the mechanical part was particularly complex because of the objectives and constraints imposed during specification:

- limit in-service mass to 84 tons;
- fall within the international gauge limit;
- mount electrical equipment from AEG and the BBC indifferently.

An extremely light chassis structure and a particularly careful design of the electrical part were used to contain the mass, achieving the goal with a deviation of less than 3% (86000 kg for locomotives with AEG electrical part and 85 400 kg for those with BBC equipment).

The constraints generated by the international gauge limit, which was 300 mm lower in height than the German gauge limit, and the interchangeability of the electrical part were met by designing a coupling system between the body and bogies that would allow the floor level of the driving cabs to be lowered as much as possible and by recessing the main transformer deeply into the floor.

In addition, to facilitate maintenance work, the central area of the crate, intended to contain the electrical equipment, was divided into three individually removable elements on the shop floor.

==== Coloring ====
All "Europa-Loks" were delivered in the "steel blue" color scheme, then standard for DB fast passenger train electric locomotives, extended to the roof for the first time, while the chassis and bogies were painted in a new shade of gray.

During the first general overhaul, some locomotives were repainted in the new "ocean blue-beige" color scheme, notably 184 002 in June 1986 and 184 003 in July of that year.

=== Electrical part ===
The electrical part of the E 410 001-003 (later 184 001-003) locomotives was made by AEG making use of power electronics for the first time, while the E 410 011-012 (later 184 111-112) were prepared by BBC using traditional electromechanical technology.

==== Common components ====
The electrical components common to the two series were mainly housed on the locomotive's roof, where the pantographs and their connecting line, the main disconnector and the main switch for alternating current were located; the extra-rapid switch for direct current, which had to operate with currents up to 2000 A, was instead placed in the engine room because its large size prevented its housing on the roof.

Finally, in the turret on the roof were housed the resistors for electric braking.

===== Pantographs =====
Having to circulate on the electrified networks of different railway administrations on which there were overhead contact lines with very different geometrical and mechanical characteristics (e.g., laying height, polygonation and material of the catenary, position of the supporting brackets in relation to the contact wire, maximum force that could be impressed on the contact wire by the pantograph), (Note: Differences in contact line cross-section and pull, and consequently those in the width and materials of the contact strips and pantograph pressure on it, were and are one of the major constraints to interoperability. Cf Leonardo Micheletti, Sulla trazione elettrica ferroviaria, in La tecnica professionale, n.s. 19 (2012), no. 4, pp. 13-19.) which required the use of different types of pantographs, a compromise solution was adopted involving the use of four single-arm pantographs, two of which were identical to each other.

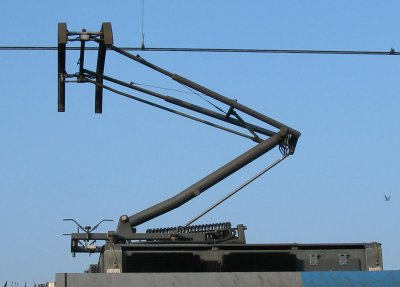
Example of a single-arm double-slide pantograph.

The specialization of the pantographs, numbered from 1 to 4 starting from locomotive cab 1, is summarized in the following table:

	Pantographs 1 and 4			Pantograph 2		Pantograph 3		
Railway network	NS	SNCF	SNCB	DB	ŐBB	FS	FFS	SNCF
Type of electrification	1,5 kV =		3 kV =	15 kV ~		3 kV =	15 kV ~	25 kV ~
Contact strip type	quadruple			double		double		
Contact strip width	1 950 mm			1 900 mm		1 460 mm		
Contact strip material	hard coal			coal		steel		

The pantographs were connected in parallel with each other with a line designed with insulation for the voltage of 25 kV.

To select the type of power supply, the engineer operated the button corresponding to the rail network under which the locomotive was located, and the control system, once verified that the voltage on the pantograph matched the selection made, automatically configured the traction circuit appropriately.

On the shunting bench, in addition to the selection buttons for the countries in which the locomotive operated daily, there were also buttons for the Swiss Federal Railways (SBB) and Austrian Federal Railways (ŐBB) networks, on which the locomotive was not scheduled to run in commercial service.

===== Repetition of signals in the vehicle =====
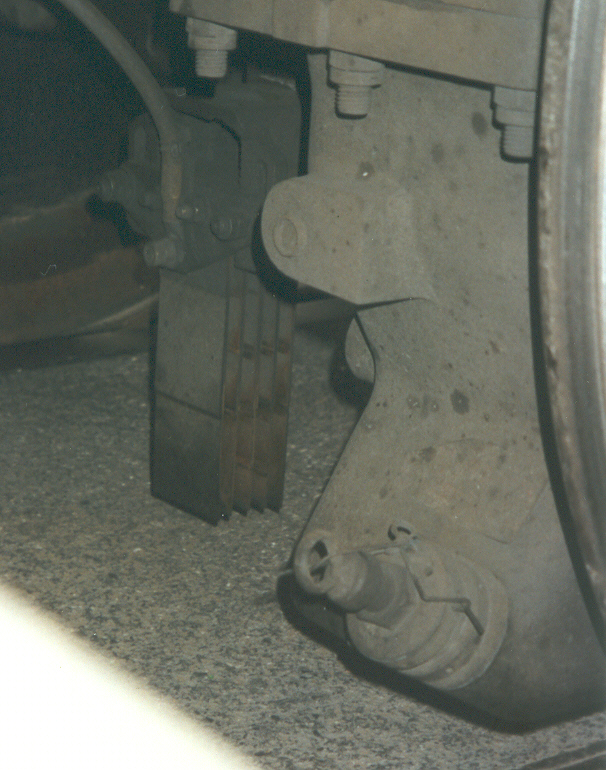
Contact brush similar to the one installed on DB 184 locomotives.

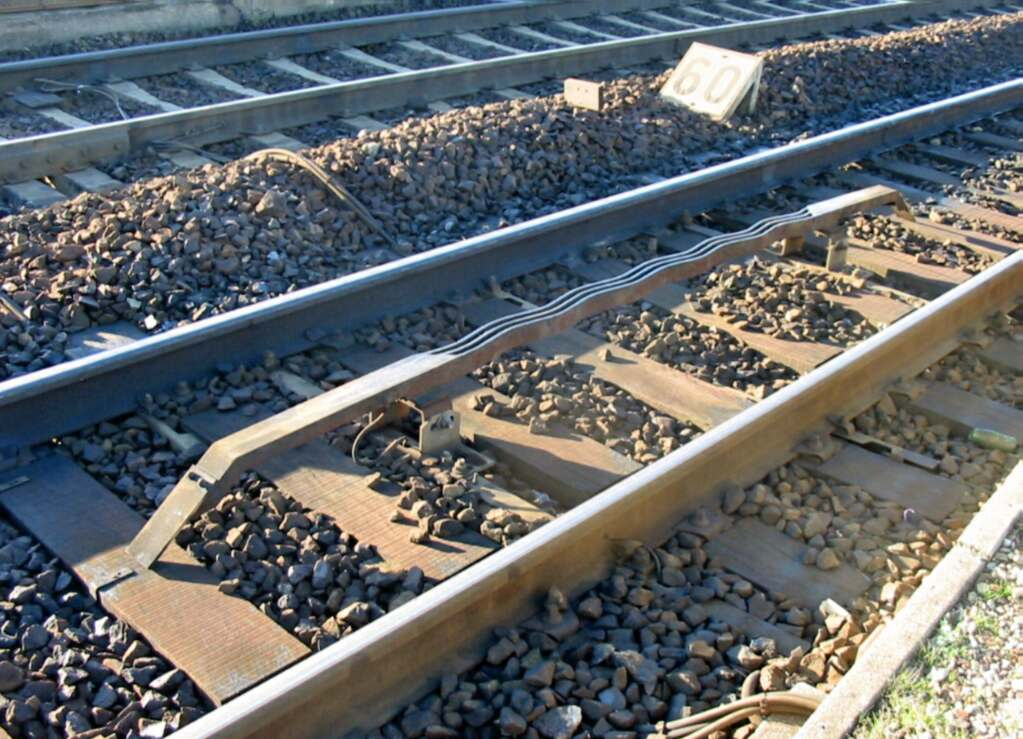
The "crocodile" for signal repetition at the machine.

Having to run on networks with different railway signaling systems, the locomotives were equipped with the in-car signal repetition systems used by the administrations concerned; in particular, the INDUSI (Note: INDUSI: an acronym for INDUktive zugSIcherung (inductive train safety).) discontinuous repetition system adopted by the German Federal Railways (DB), was joined by the French BRS (Note: BRS: stands for Boite de Répetition des Signaux (signal repetition box).) system adopted by the French (SNCF), Luxembourg (CFL) and Belgian (SNCB) railways.

The INDUSI system was initially installed in the I 60 version, later upgraded to the I 60R version and then, limited to the 184 003 which was the only locomotive still in service in the 1990s, to the PZB 90 version.

The French BRS system required the installation of a metal contact brush on the front bogie of the locomotive, intended to crawl over a skid placed in the middle of the track, called a "crocodile" because of its shape, which has the task of transmitting information on board the rolling stock about the appearance of the signal about to be encountered. In addition to the brush and the on-board equipment connected to it, the BRS system required the installation in the driver's cab of a tachograph (Hasler type) on which the appearance of the signal encountered and the speed of the train as it passed over the relevant "crocodile" were recorded.

===== Multiple control =====
The locomotives were equipped for dual traction with multiple control; the connection was via a low-voltage electrical conduit, whose 36-pole electrical couplers were located on the front walls.

==== AEG traction circuit ====
Principle diagram of the traction circuit of four-current electric locomotives 184 001-003 with AEG electrical equipment.

The electrical part of the E 410 001-003 (later 184 001-003) locomotives was made by AEG by resorting for the first time to the use of power electronics to drive the motors.

AEG engineers introduced a twofold innovation with these locomotives, which consisted of the continuous speed regulation of the traction motors achieved with a semi-controlled thyristor rectifier bridge and the adoption of a thyristor inverter that powered the locomotive's main transformer by converting the direct current drawn from the 1.5 or 3 kV catenary to 112 Hz alternating current.

The traction equipment consisted of:

- two thyristor inverters;
- one main transformer;
- two thyristor rectifier bridges;
- four traction motors.

===== Thyristor inverters =====
When the locomotive operated under a direct current catenary, the main transformer was powered by means of a pair of modular thyristor inverters, then the world's only application for railway traction, which converted direct current to alternating current.

The two inverter modules, with a unit capacity of 1 600 kVA, were connected in parallel or in series, respectively, depending on whether the DC voltage present on the pantograph was 1.5 kV or 3 kV.

The switching frequency of the inverter, and thus the power frequency of the main transformer, was initially set at 100 Hz, but had to be increased to 112 Hz to avoid electromagnetic interference that disturbed the signaling system of the Belgian railways (SNCB).

Already at the design stage it was planned to drive the two inverter modules with a 90° phase shift to limit the disturbances introduced by switching on the DC power lines, but this expedient had practically much less effectiveness than expected.

===== Main transformer =====
When the locomotive operated under an alternating-current catenary, the main transformer was fed directly from the pantograph by means of a specific 25 kV primary winding with a 15 kV intermediate tap, appropriately connected according to the voltage present on the contact line.

The main transformer, of the BLT 121e type, expressly developed in those years, was capable of operating at the frequencies of 16 2/3 Hz, 50 Hz and 112 Hz.

It was the bulkiest component of the traction equipment, but it was possible to contain its total mass to 9 300 kg, including all accessories and the refilling of 2 150 kg of oil, due to the use of a new aluminum alloy for the cooling oil tank and the elimination of the intermediate sockets and electromechanical selector switches of the graduator that was normally used for speed regulation of single-phase collector motors (Note: Single-phase collector motors, also called "direct motors," are conceptually identical to DC motors, but differ from them constructively in limiting the negative effects of alternating current. The latter, in fact, induces eddy currents in the magnetic core (Foucault currents) and, more importantly, generates an induced electromotive force (e.m.f.), called "transformation e.m.f.," which greatly disturbs motor commutation by generating deleterious sparks on the collector brushes. The "transforming f.e.m." constitutes the main limitation of direct motors, so much so that its undesirable effects forced railway networks that adopted alternating current electric traction to limit its frequency to 16 2/3 Hz, i.e., one-third of the industrial frequency of 50 Hz. Cf Machefert-Tassin, I diversi, n. 3, pp. 297-298) and Mayer, La scelta, pp. 251–252).) on AC locomotives.

The main transformer was also equipped with two additional secondary windings for supplying power to the locomotive's auxiliary services (e.g., traction motor fans, motor-compressor unit for compressed air, etc.) and for the electric heating circuit of the coaches, which in DC operation was instead supplied directly from the catenary.

===== Thyristor rectifiers =====
The traction motors were driven continuously (Note: Electromechanical regulation was carried out discontinuously, with speed steps determined by the selection of progressively higher voltage transformer sockets, in locomotives with single-phase motors, or by the progressive exclusion of starting rheostat resistors, in locomotives with DC motors.) by means of a pair of thyristor rectifier modules in a "semi-controlled bridge" configuration, (Note: The semicontrolled bridge is a variant of the Graetz bridge in which two diodes of one branch are replaced by a pair of thyristors. By adjusting the turn-on delay of the thyristors with respect to the passage through zero of the alternating voltage at the ends of the bridge, only part of each half-wave can be allowed to pass through, thus obtaining at the output a rectified voltage whose average value can be varied seamlessly, allowing continuous adjustment of the motor speed.) which replaced the cumbersome electromechanical regulating devices based on a series of intermediate transformer sockets and associated switching devices found in conventional AC locomotives.

Each rectifier module was connected to a specific secondary winding of the main transformer and powered the two traction motors of each bogie permanently connected in parallel with each other.

The rectifier modules were arranged in two frames in the engine room, each of which contained 80 thyristors and 40 air-cooled silicon diodes. The total mass of 1,500 kilograms of the two frames, compared with that of the previous locomotive E 320 01 (later 182 001), which adopted silicon diodes of an earlier type produced by AEG itself, resulted in a mass saving of about 300 kilograms with improved performance of 30 percent.

Once maximum voltage was reached on the motors, further speed increase was possible by means of four degrees of shunt, achieved by means of an additional control system.

===== Traction motors =====
The traction motors type UZ 116 64H were derived from the ripple-current motors (Note: Skew current motors are typically used in single-phase, industrial-frequency rolling stock, where they are supplied with the current, called "pulsed" or "wavy," supplied by rectifier bridges. They are basically DC collector motors to which a smoothing inductor, called a "self," is added in series, generally used alone or in combination with slight ohmic shunting of the inductor circuits. In fact, DC traction motors cannot be directly supplied with rectified current, since the alternating component of this current would create in the armature the same phenomenon of "transforming f.e.m." that disturbs the switching of "direct motors." Cf Machefert-Tassin, I diversi, n. 3, pp. 297-298) and Mayer, La scelta, p. 252).) used by AEG itself on the bifrequency locomotive E 320 01 (later 182.001), further developed with a three-point anchoring system and equipped with the "Gummiring-Kardan-Antrieb" rubber ring gimbal drive.

The four motors, characterized by a maximum supply voltage of 1 050 V and an hourly power output of 800 kW each, individually powered the locomotive's bogie wheelsets (Bo'Bo' running gear scheme), providing it with a total mass power output of 38.2 kW/t.

===== Electric braking =====
E 410 001-003 (later 184 001-003) were equipped with electric resistance braking, achieved by adjusting the separate excitation circuit of the motors, which could be used alone as a brake to limit speed during downhill runs, or to supplement continuous air braking.

==== BBC traction circuit ====
Unlike that of the AEG, the electrical part of the E 410 011-012 (later 184 111-112) locomotives did not have any innovative features: in fact, the BBC resorted to the solution, commonly adopted at the time for four-current traction units, which involved the use of DC-fed motors with rheostatic regulation directly from the 1.5 kV and 3 kV catenaries and via transformer and rectifier bridge from the 15 kV 16 2/3 Hz and 25 kV 50 Hz catenaries.

Speed regulation of the motors was achieved by progressively excluding by means of contactors the starting rheostat resistors, with a total of 72 acceleration steps.

Once the maximum supply voltage of the motors was reached, a further increase in their speed was possible by means of an additional circuit to control shunt.

The choice of electromechanical drive meant that the 184 111 and 112 locomotives, with ABB electrical parts, did not create the electromagnetic interference problems caused by the AEG electronic drive of the 184 001-003 on the Belgian railways' signaling system.

The ripple-current traction motors type MBg 810 were developed by the BBC by drawing on the experience gained in 3 kV isolation with other types of motors for single-voltage locomotives and by referring to the design of the motors used on the bifrequency locomotive E 320 11 (later 182 011).

They were suitable for both rectified alternating current operation, with an hourly output of 810 kW, and direct current operation, with an hourly output of 850 kW, and were designed for an operating voltage of 1.5 kV, which made it necessary to connect the motors of each bogie in series in operation under the 3 kV overhead line.

The different dimensions of the BBC MBg 810 motor, which was larger in diameter but shorter in length than the AEG ZU 116 64H, forced Krupp's designers to develop a trolley devised so that both types of motors could be installed in it, in order to ensure flexible and quick replacement in the workshop.

To drive auxiliary services (e.g. traction motor fans, compressed air compressor, etc.), BBC resorted to DC motors powered by 220 V voltage obtained by lowering and rectifying line voltage when the locomotive operated under an AC catenary, or by a 400 Hz static converter when the locomotive operated under a DC catenary.

Subject to the differences mentioned above, BBC locomotives had similar characteristics to AEG locomotives.

== Experiments ==
=== Experiments in Germany ===
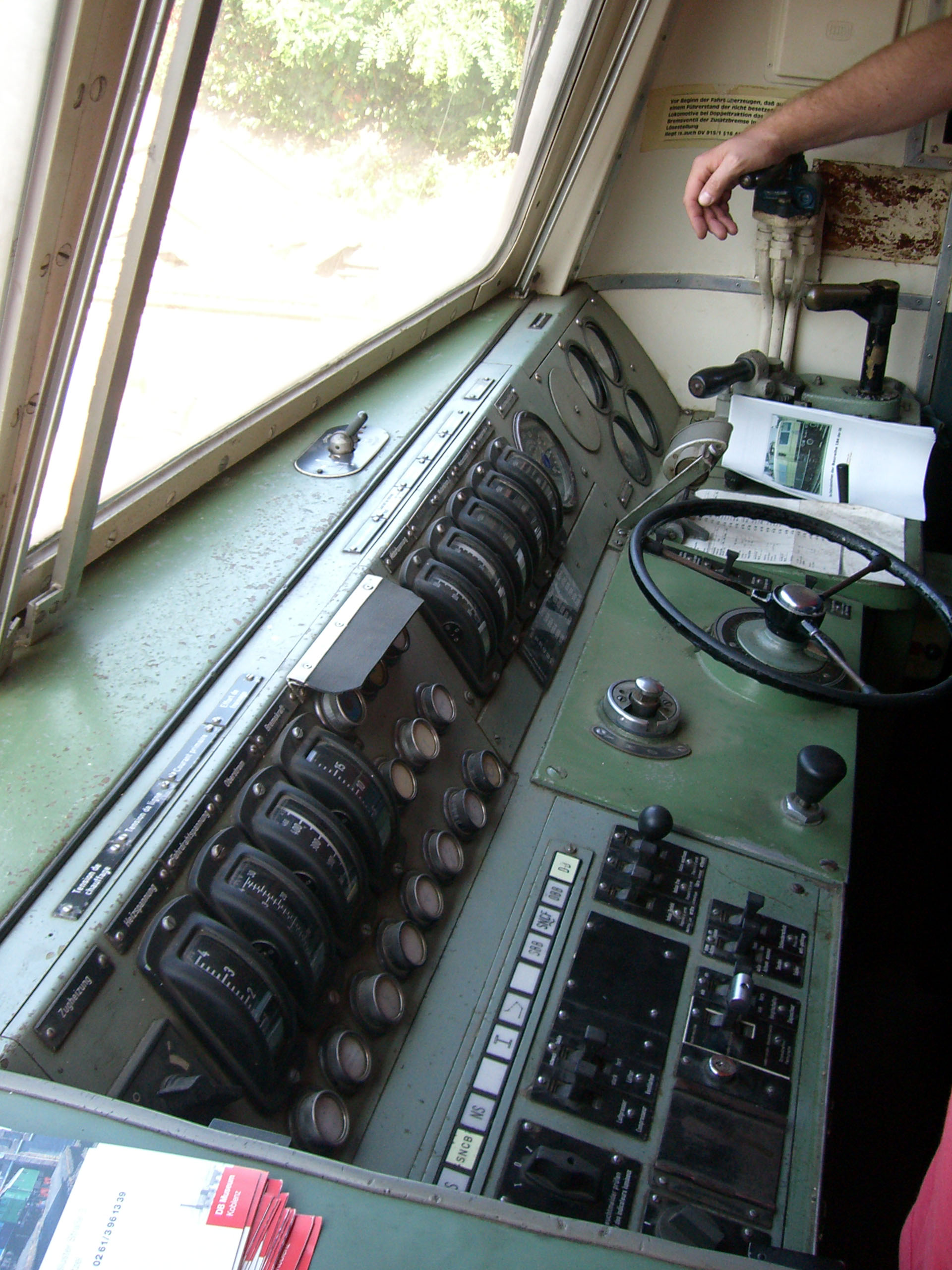
The control desk of locomotive 184 003 in 2007.

The E410 001 began test runs in December 1966 in the Munich area, initially manifesting a glitch that caused a fuse in the rectifier cabinet to repeatedly burn out following a particular maneuver; after a few attempts, the cause of the fault was identified and the problem was finally resolved.

Another mishap occurred on the transformers of the AEG locomotives, which, due to over-optimization, showed a tendency to overheat on test runs with a 650-ton train on the "Geislinger Steige," a steeply rising ramp on the Stuttgart-Ulm line. (Note: Uphill ramp of 22.5‰ overcoming an elevation gain of 112 m in 5.6 km.) It was therefore necessary to provide for their rewinding with Nomex insulation, a newly developed material resistant to high temperatures, significantly lengthening the tuning phase of the locomotives.

At the end of the extensive testing, E 410 001 was delivered on trial to the DB on October 25, 1966, and was followed by the remaining locomotives until March 1967.

The tuning was delicate, and the five E 410 locomotives obtained approval on the DB network between the end of September 1967 and the end of August 1968, by which time their final designation had already changed to Group 184.

=== Experiments in Belgium, France and the Netherlands ===
The 184 locomotives carried out a series of test runs on the European rail networks on which they were scheduled to run, gaining approval on SNCB's Belgian 3 kV network in September 1968, SNCF's French 25 kV 50 Hz network in February 1969, and NS's Dutch 1.5 kV network in July 1969; however, on the latter network they never ran.

In October 1968, test runs for acceptance on the SNCB's 3 kV network were held between Aachen and Liège, and on this occasion the 184 001-003 AEGs had an opportunity to demonstrate their superiority over the SNCB's conventional DC locomotives, managing to haul on the steeply sloping Aachen Hauptbahnhof-Aachen Süd section 600-ton passenger trains at a speed of about 60 km/h without needing the booster locomotive.

However, approval on the SNCB network was complicated by the fact that the AEG series locomotives (184 001-003) were initially equipped with an inverter with a switching frequency of 100 Hz, whose harmonics disturbed the Belgian signaling system. To solve the drawback, the frequency of the inverter was raised to 112 Hz, after which the tests were repeated with the 184 002 on the Aachen Hauptbahnhof-Welkenraedt section of the Aachen-Liege line without causing any more interference with SNCB signaling.

Acceptance runs on the SNCF 25 kV 50 Hz network took place between Saarbrücken to Metz on February 5, 1969.

=== Experiments in Italy ===
Since the 1950s, driven by foreign experiments, Italian technical circles had been considering the possibility of building multi-system traction vehicles for international services.

The technological debate was widely reflected in technical journals, including Ingegneria ferroviaria, La tecnica professionale and L'elettrotecnica.

The FS, which already had extensive experience with Le 840.200 electric train trailers and had considered the possibility of modifying four ETR.200 electric trains to employ them also with three-phase AC power, around 1965 had studied the possibility of carrying out international services by equipping some Le 601 trailers with converters through which to power ALe 601s or by building four-current locomotives based on the mechanical design of the D.443.

In April 1972 the 184 003 was sent to Italy following an agreement between FS and DB to perform a series of tests framed in a program coordinated by the Office de Recherches et d'Essais (ORE), the research and experimentation office of the Union Internationale des Chemins de fer (UIC).

The tests, in addition to evaluating the performance of the locomotive, were aimed at verifying the effect of traction current harmonics generated by the switching of the locomotive's power electronic circuits on the FS's signaling circuits and telecommunications equipment.

The experimentation took place from April 13 to 20 on the Camerlata-Seregno sections of the Milan-Chiasso line and the Brescia-Chiari section of the Milan-Venice line, on which ground measurement equipment was placed on the track circuits, telephone cables and traction line power substations.

The test train consisted of the DB 184 003 locomotive, the Vdlz 801.001 dynamometer car, the 60 83 99-89 000-3 Vosz oscillogram car, the 2nd class UIC-X car 51 83 22-86 134-2, and the E.444.003 acting as a reserve locomotive. (Note: According to Michael Ruge (Die Elektrolokomotiven, pp. 60–61)) this was locomotive E.444.003, a fact that is confirmed in Claudio Pedrazzini's photos.)

In the following days the said convoy, to which sixteen coaches were added, bringing its mass to 862 tons, performed traction tests on the Bologna-Prato section of the Bologna-Florence Direttissima, where the 184 demonstrated its excellent strength and acceleration qualities by carrying the train, which was also made to tick from a standstill, at more than 95 km/h on the steepest ramps with a measured tractive force at the hook of 220 kN.

During the tests, insufficient output filtering repeatedly caused disturbances to the telecommunication and signaling equipment (among other things, station teletypewriters were turned off).

Giovanni Cornolò reports that the FS had previously declined DB's proposal to purchase a "limited lot" of 184s with which to perform international services (probably TEE). This disinterest, which followed a similar refusal made to the SBB regarding the proposed acquisition of a "limited number" of electric trains of the RAe 1050 group, was perhaps due to the delay with which, compared to forecasts, the remaining part of the Ligurian-Piedmontese network still electrified with the 3 kV alternating current system, which should have been covered by these means to carry out the services assigned to them, was transformed into the national 3 kV direct current system. (Note: Had the RAe 1050s or 184s actually been purchased by the FS their service on the three-phase AC-powered lines would have involved the use of Diesel locomotives to be attested to the entire train, as done later for some express trains in domestic service in order to ensure a higher commercial speed than was possible by attesting the three-phase locomotives to them, with obvious greater expense to purchase a sufficient number of machines to be used only for this purpose since, given the prestige of international trains and the consequent need to ensure continuity of operation, according to FS practice there should have been in the fleet at least a trio of units of which the first in normal service (presumably not only for international trains), the second in the shop for scheduled maintenance and the third in reserve in storage to cope with unexpected failures of the other two.)

== Operation ==
=== Operating service ===
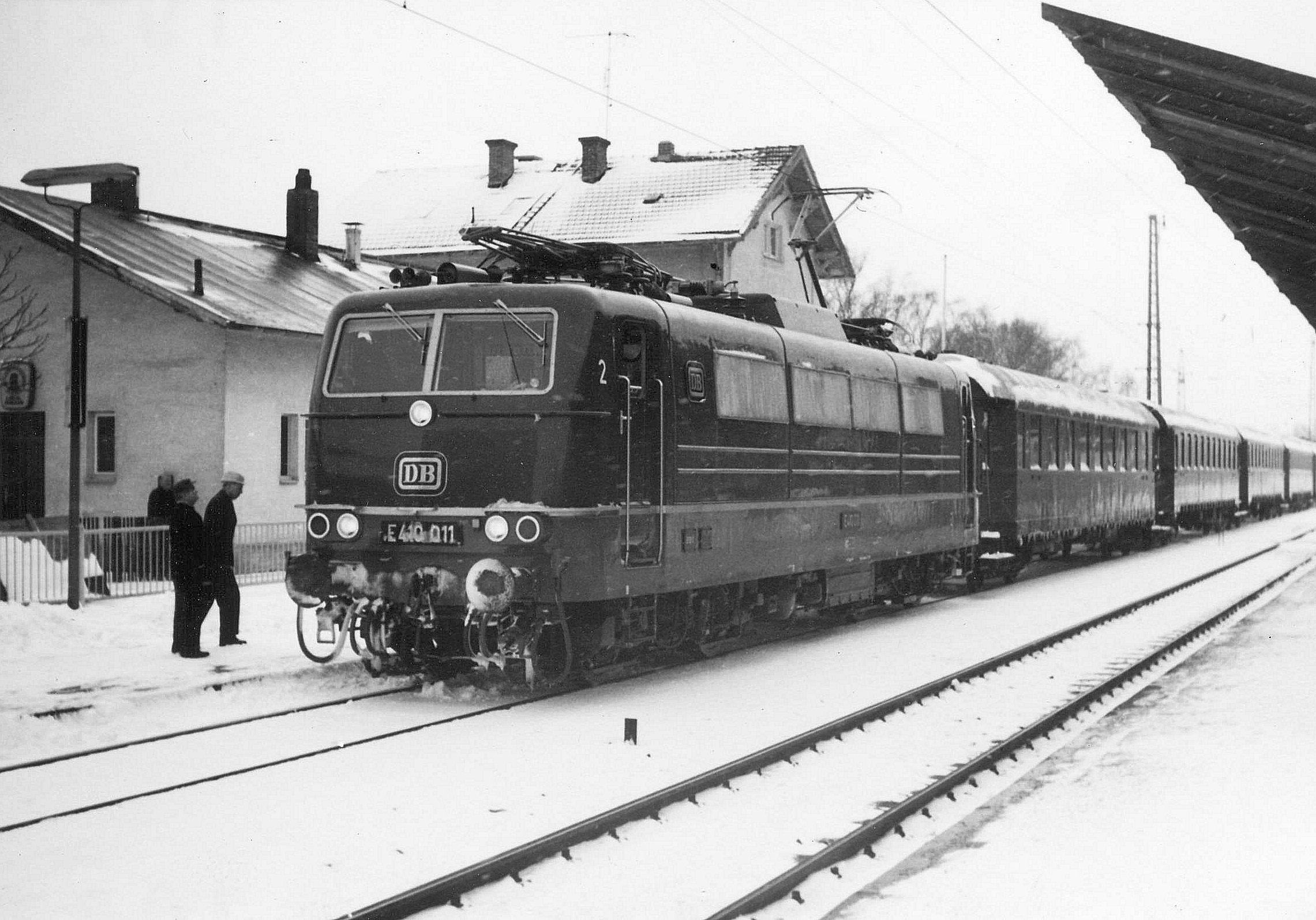
Locomotive E 410 011 with origin marking at a stop at Gauting station in the winter of 1967-1968.

The E 410 locomotives were assigned starting in the summer of 1967 to the Cologne Deutzerfeld depot, where they initially served with the exclusion of commuter and express trains, a limitation that lapsed as of February 1, 1968.

In 1968 the E 410s were reclassified into the 184 group, retaining the progressive numbering 001-003 and 011-012, which was changed to 111-112 for the latter the following year.

After numerous line trials, the 184s from the Cologne Deutzerfeld depot were put into service on the TEE Paris-Ruhr in 1969 and on the TEE Parsifal in 1970, (Note: Mertens, Malaspina, TEE, p. 80). The same source claims that the 184s were also put into service on the TEE Goethe beginning in 1970, a circumstance that is highly unlikely because the locomotives assigned to the TEE Goethe were stationed at the Saarbrücken depot, while all 184s were assigned to the Cologne depot. The only locomotive that may have been in regular service on the TEE Goethe is 184 002, which was transferred to Saarbrücken in 1974 after being downgraded to a bifrequency machine.) establishing on this occasion a daily shift on the Dortmund-Liege-Aachen-Liege-Dortmund route, in which the 184 covered the Dortmund-Liege sections at the head of the Paris Ruhr TEE, Liège-Aachen-Liège with the Parsifal TEE pair, and Liège-Dortmund at the head of the Paris Ruhr TEE. The shift remained virtually unchanged even after the restriction to Düsseldorf in September 1971 of the TEE Paris Ruhr and the further restriction to Cologne in June 1975 of the TEE Molière, which had replaced it on almost the same track since June 1973.

In 1974 a faulty maneuver on locomotive 184 002 caused a very serious failure in the DC section, which was virtually destroyed. The extent of the damage was such that the decision was made to completely remove the equipment for 1.5- and 3-kV DC operation, including pantographs 1 and 4, thus downgrading 184 002 to a bifrequency locomotive and making it analogous to the Group 181 machines. After the restoration work, 184 002 was transferred to the Saarbrücken locomotive depot, where it was placed side by side with 181 on shifts in inter-frontal service with France.

184 001 and 003 also proved unreliable in DC operation, being subject to a series of failures caused by voltage surges occurring on the 3 kV-fed contact line of the Belgian rail network. The surges were caused by the input of energy into the line by SNCB locomotives during electrical regenerative braking, which caused, under particular conditions, (Note: The voltage increase beyond tolerance limits occurred when the energy fed into the line by SNCB locomotives during regenerative electric braking could not be used. This occurred when no locomotive under tractive effort, i.e., engaged in pulling a convoy under acceleration or on an uphill track, was present on the tracks fed by the same electrical substation. The failure could thus occur under the above conditions when the 184 was stationary, engaged on a downhill route or, less easily, had already reached its set speed on a flat route, a condition in which the current draw is limited to the one needed to overcome aerodynamic resistances and to ensure that the train's services are powered.) an increase in average voltage of up to 4 kV with peaks of 7 kV. These values did not affect the SNCB's electromechanically operated locomotives, but, as there were still no adequate protection components, they were deleterious to the inverter that equipped the 184 AEGs, eventually forcing DB to withdraw them from international service with Belgium.

The 184 111 and 112 BBCs, electromechanically operated like the SNCB locomotives, were immune to the aforementioned surges, but after the withdrawal of the 184 001 and 003s they proved to be insufficient in number to guarantee the operation of the Molière and Parsifal TEEs and were also diverted from international service.

184 001, 003, 111, and 112 were then downgraded to bifrequency locomotives, removing their DC traction circuits and pantographs 1 and 4, and transferred to the Saarbrücken locomotive depot, where they were put into service on the Trier-Ehrang branch from the 1979 summer timetable.

=== Cancellation and museum conservation ===
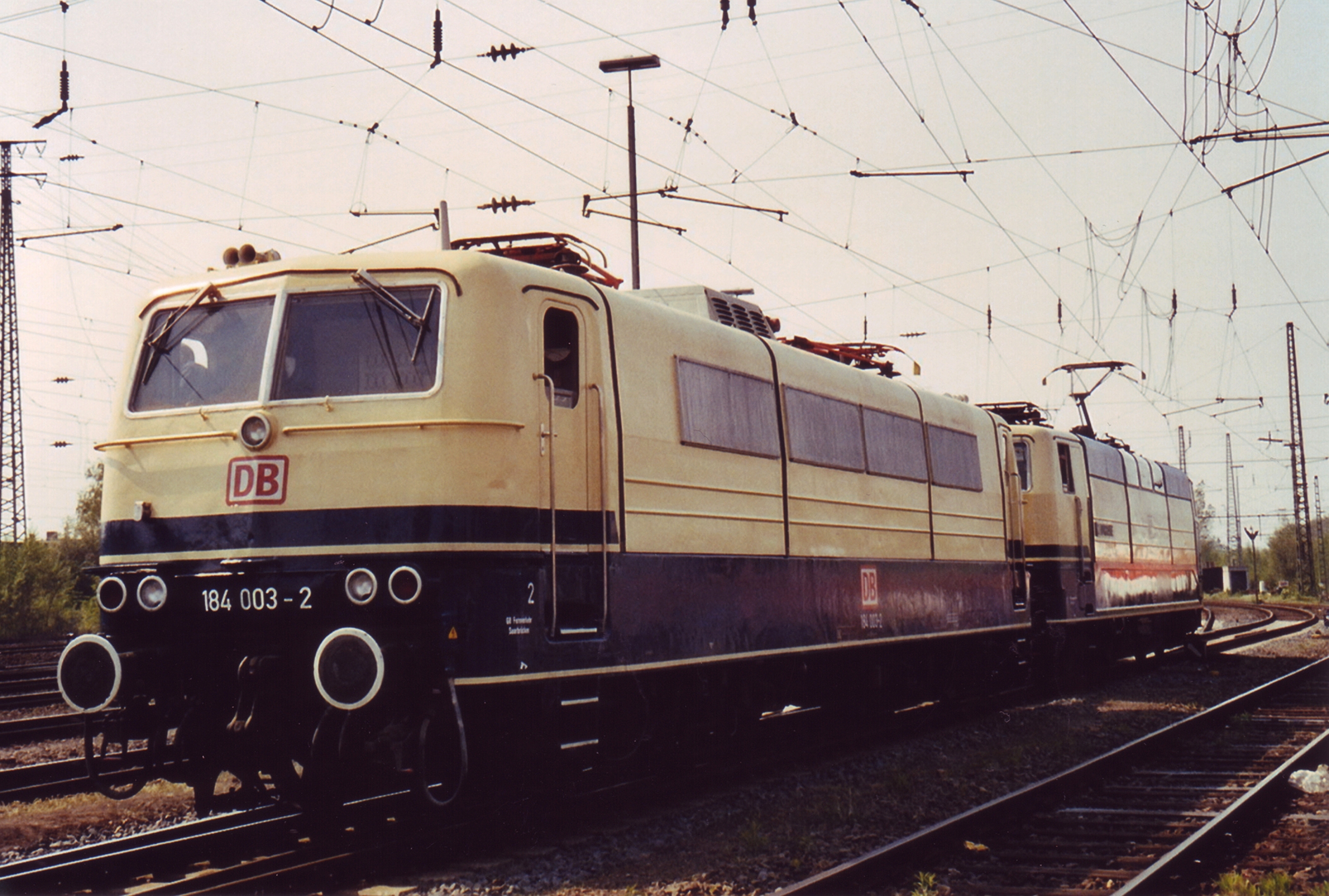
The 184 003 pushed by the 181 211 during a locomotive parade on the outdoor exhibition grounds of the DB Museum in Koblenz-Lützel on May 6, 2006.

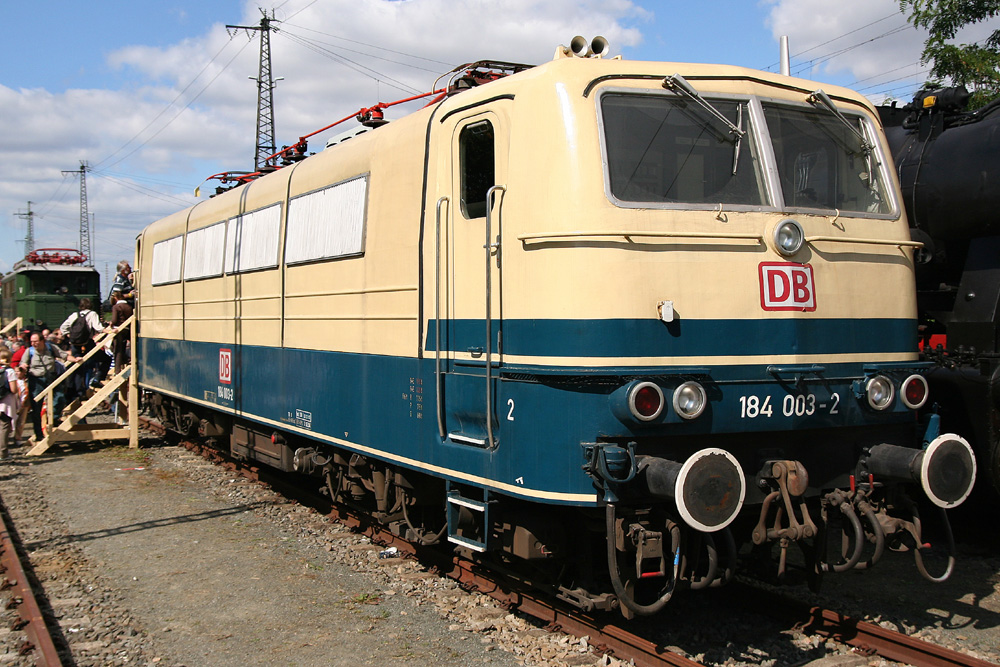
Locomotive 184 003 displayed in Fürth station on September 15, 2007.

==== 184 001-003 locomotives ====
184 001, after suffering an accident on October 6, 1993 at Apach on the SNCF 25-kV network, was shelved the following October 12, then dismantled and scrapped.

184 002 was shelved on October 1, 1994, and disposed of the following November 30, then remained in the DB repair shops in Opladen until June 6, 2000, and was scrapped later that month by an outside company in the same city.

184 003, the last locomotive of the 184 group that remained in active service, suffered damage to the battery charger in early January 2002; after a futile attempt to repair it at the Saarbrücken locomotive depot, it was shelved the following January 24 and disposed of on February 27 with a mileage of 3 297 346 km. On March 1, 2002, it was transferred to the DB museum in Koblenz-Lützel.

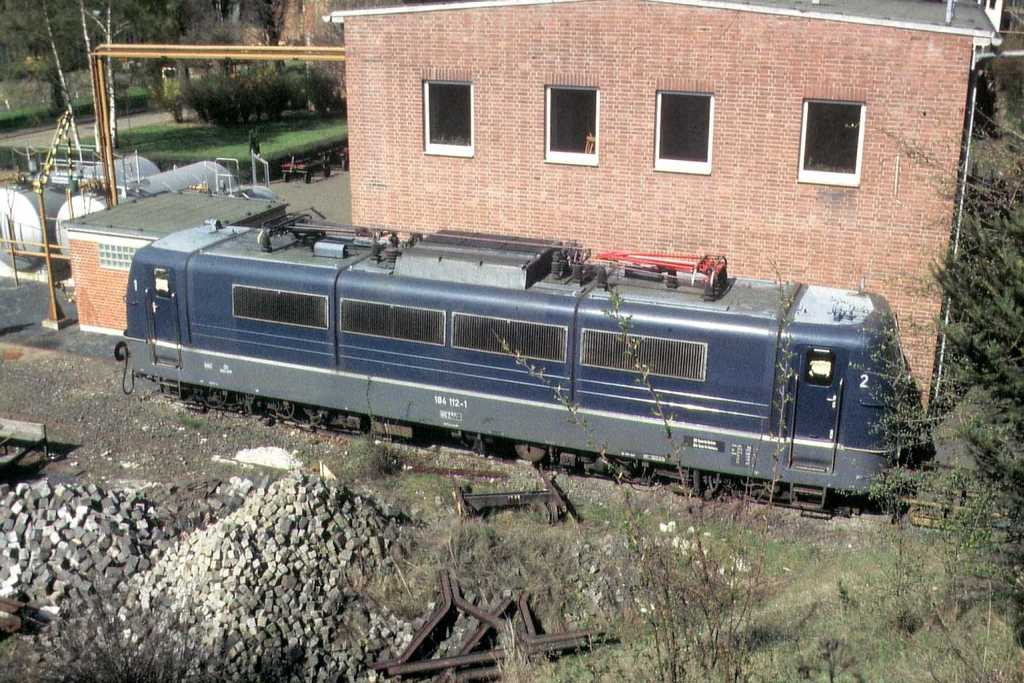
Locomotive 184 112, still without pantographs 1 and 4, in the DB repair shops in Kassel on April 27, 1984.

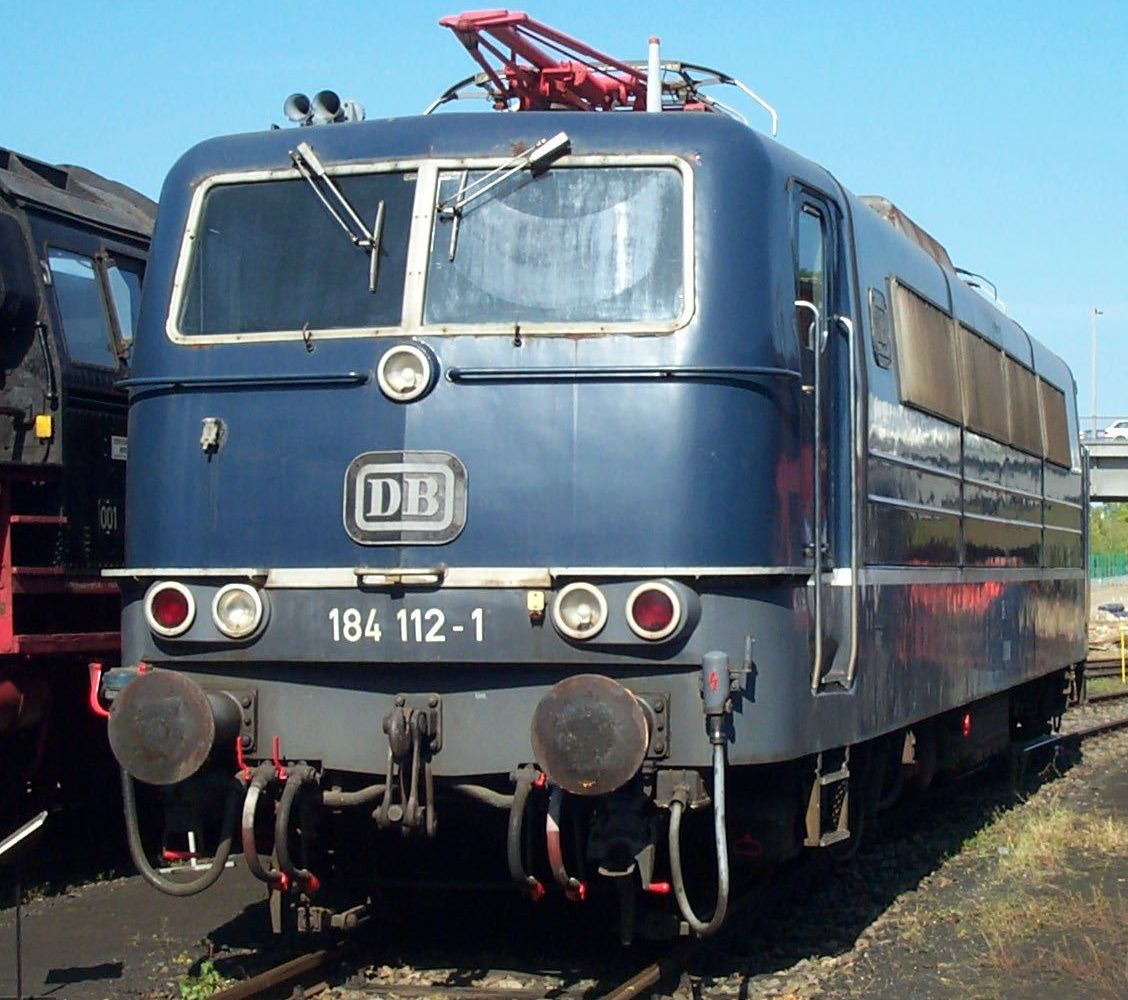
Locomotive 184 112 on display at the Berlin Museum of Science and Technology on November 16, 2003.

==== 184 111-112 locomotives ====
The 184 111-112 locomotives did not have a particularly long life: as the only DB cars equipped with Swiss BBC technology, they were never looked upon favorably, both because of the difficulties in finding spare parts and the consequently high maintenance costs.

The 184 111, shelved on October 3, 1980, was admitted on September 24, 1981, to the DB repair shop shed in Opladen, where it remained available for two years to supply spare parts; in 1984 it was dismantled and scrapped in the shops themselves.

The 184 112 was admitted to the DB repair workshops in Opladen on December 17, 1982, because of a defective surge protector; in the absence of the spare part it was then shelved on June 30, 1983, and destined for the Museum of Science and Technology in Berlin. In July 1984 it was transferred to the DB repair shops in Kassel where pantographs 1 and 4 were reassembled and sent to Berlin, where it was displayed from May 19, 1987 in the museum garden.

=== Statistical data ===
Initial classification	Manufacturer	Year of start of construction	Approval date	Classification since 1968	Classification since 1969	Date of suspension	Status
E 410 001	Krupp/AEG	1966	October 1, 1967	184 001		October 12, 1993	Demolished
E 410 002	Krupp/AEG	1966	September 29, 1967	184 002		October 1, 1994	Demolished
E 410 003	Krupp/AEG	1967	July 26, 1968	184 003		January 24, 2002	On display at the DB Museum in Koblenz-Lützel
E 410 011	Krupp/BBC	1967	July 26, 1968	184 011	184 111	October 3, 1980	Demolished
E 410 012	Krupp/BBC	1967	August 29, 1968	184 012	184 112	June 30, 1983	On display at the Museum of Science and Technology in Berlin

== Model railway reproductions ==
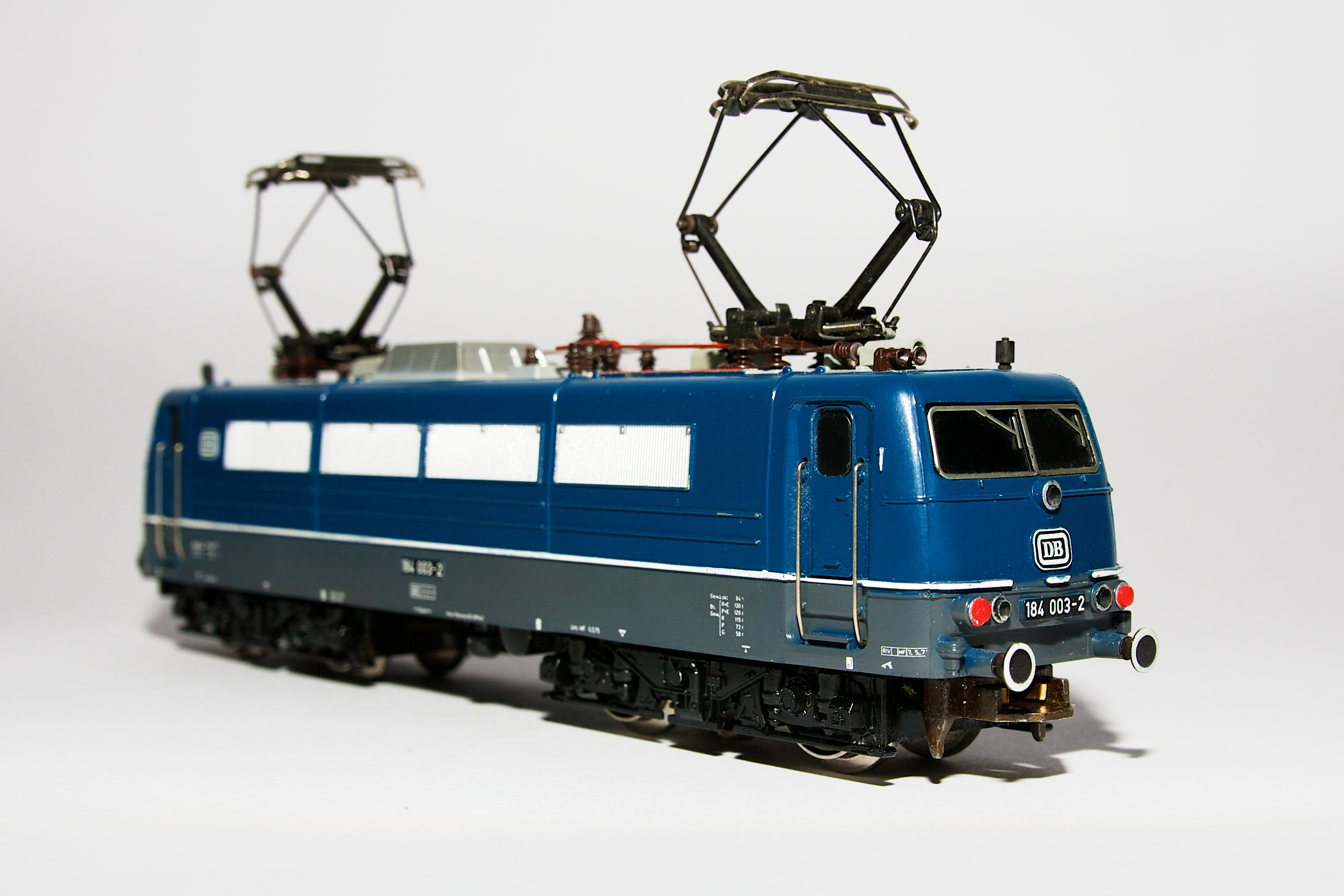
Trix model of the 184 003-2 in original livery.

The popularity of DB 184 locomotives is also demonstrated by the numerous model railway reproductions in H0 and N scales provided by several specialized firms, including Jouef, Märklin, Trix and, with great timeliness and in HO and N scales, Lima.

The Märklin model was presented at the 49th Nuremberg International Toy Fair, held February 5–11, 1998.

The latest addition is the H0-scale reproduction of the prototype E 410 001 made by LS Models.

== See also ==
- Deutsche Bundesbahn
- Trans Europ Express

== Bibliography ==
- Yves Machefert-Tassin (1963). "I diversi tipi di locomotive e di treni automotori policorrente". Ingegneria Ferroviaria. 18 (nn. 2, 3, 4): n. 2, pp. 175–185, n. 3, pp. 291–299, n. 4, pp. 397–409. ISSN 0020-0956. (traduzione di Manlio Perilli di un articolo pubblicato in Le Génie Civil, 15 giugno, 1º luglio e 15 luglio 1962).
- "Die neuen Viersystem Lokomotiven der Deutschen Bundesbahn Baureihe E 410". Glasers Annalen (in German). 91 (1): 23–27. 1967. ISSN 0017-0844.
- Giuseppe Vicuna (1968). Organizzazione e tecnica ferroviaria. Roma: Collegio Ingegneri Ferroviari Italiani. pp. 430–431.
- Giulio Giovanardi (1978). "Ferrovia". Enciclopedia italiana, Appendice IV. 1961-1978. Vol. I. A-Ga. Roma: Istituto della Enciclopedia italiana. p. 779.
- Lucio Mayer (March 1978). "La scelta del sistema di trazione elettrica al lume di recenti soluzioni". Ingegneria Ferroviaria. 33 (3): 251–261. ISSN 0020-0956.
- "Gli elettrotreni svizzeri TEE". I Treni Oggi. 7 (63): 16–20. September 1986. ISSN 0392-4602.
- "Locomotive policorrenti in Italia". I Treni Oggi. 11 (109): 30–33. November 1990. ISSN 0392-4602.
- Erminio Mascherpa (May 1997). "Un progetto di trent'anni fa". I Treni. 18 (182): 16–17. ISSN 0392-4602.
- Maurice Mertens; Jean-Pierre Malaspina (2008). TEE. La leggenda dei Trans-Europ-Express. Salò: Editrice Trasporti su Rotaie.
- Giovanni Cornolò; Alberto Furregoni (May 2009). "La storia delle locomotive polisistema. Nascita ed evoluzione in Germania, Belgio, Regno Unito e Cecoslovacchia". La Tecnica Professionale. New series. 16 (5): 41–49.
- Giovanni Cornolò (2008). Dall'E.626 all'Eurostar. 1928-2008: ottant'anni di locomotive elettriche FS. Parma: Ermanno Albertelli.
- Michael Ruge (2012). "Die Elektrolokomotiven der Baureihe 181 der DB und ihre aus dem Dienst ausgeschiedenen Schwestern" (PDF) (in German). Archived from the original (PDF) on 17 March 2012.
- Blaine Bachman (2002). "The BR 184: An early multi-current locomotive" (PDF).
- Joost Wilbrink. "E 310/E 410".
- Joachim Schmitz (2002). "Die Europalok 184" (in German).
