= Class 11 =

Class 11 may refer to:

- British Rail Class 11
- DB Class VT 11.5
- DR Class E 11
- EAR 11 class
- Emu Bay Railway 11 class
- GCR Class 11B
- GCR Class 11E
- GCR Class 11F
- Indian locomotive class WAG-11
- JNR Class C11
- JNR Class DE11
- LNER Class Y11
- LSWR L11 class
- LSWR S11 class
- NSB Class 11
- NSB El 11
- Queensland A11 class locomotive
- Queensland B11 class locomotive
- Ro-11-class submarine
- SCORE Class 11, off-road racing Baja Bug
- SNCB Class 11
- Southern Pacific class AC-11
- VR Class Dm11
- VR Class Hr11
- VR Class Vk11
- YSD-11-class crane ship

== See also ==
- Type 11 (disambiguation)
