= NSB Class 12 =

Class of Norwegian steam locomotives

NSB Type 12
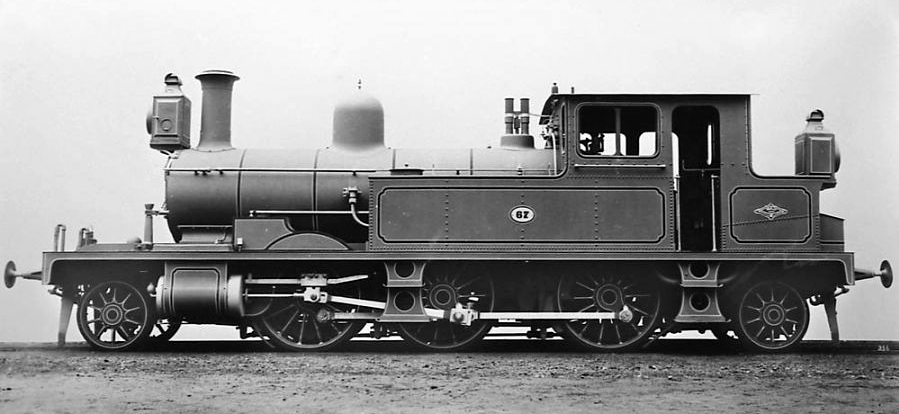
Type and origin
- Power type: Steam
- Builder: Dübs and Co. (1), Sächsische Maschinenfabrik (2)
- Build date: 1891, 1898
- Total produced: 3
Specifications
- Configuration
  - Whyte: 2-6-2T
  - UIC: 12a: 1'C1' T 12b/c: 1'C1' T n2v
- Gauge: 4 ft 8 1/2 in (1,435 mm) standard gauge
- Driver dia.: 1,448 mm (4 ft 9.0 in)
- Wheelbase: 3,810 mm (12 ft 6 in)
- Length: 11,170 mm (36 ft 8 in)
- Loco weight: 12a: 39.0 t (43.0 short tons; 38.4 long tons); 12b: 40.4 t (44.5 short tons; 39.8 long tons); 12c: 40.3 t (44.4 short tons; 39.7 long tons)
- Total weight: 12a: 46.4 t (51.1 short tons; 45.7 long tons); 12b: 49.4 t (54.5 short tons; 48.6 long tons); 12c: 50.4 t (55.6 short tons; 49.6 long tons)
- Fuel type: Coal
- Fuel capacity: 12a/b: 1.3 t (1.4 short tons; 1.3 long tons); 12c: 1.8 t (2.0 short tons; 1.8 long tons)
- Water cap.: 12a: 3.4 m^{3} (750 imp gal); 12b: 4.7 m^{3} (1,000 imp gal); 12c: 4.9 m^{3} (1,100 imp gal)
- Firebox
  - Grate area: 1.3 m^{2} (14 sq ft)
- Boiler pressure: 12a: 10 kg/cm^{2} (140 psi); 12b/c: 12 kg/cm^{2} (170 psi)
- Heating surface
  - Firebox: 80.7 m^{2} (869 sq ft)
- Cylinders: 2
- Cylinder size: 12a: 406 mm × 610 mm (16.0 in × 24.0 in)
- High-pressure cylinder: 12b/c: 425 mm × 610 mm (16.7 in × 24.0 in)
- Low-pressure cylinder: 12b/c: 635 mm × 610 mm (25.0 in × 24.0 in)
Performance figures
- Maximum speed: Forward/Reverse: 60 km/h (37 mph)
- Factor of adh.: 12a: 32.5 t (35.8 short tons; 32.0 long tons); 12b: 32.7 t (36.0 short tons; 32.2 long tons); 12c: 33.6 t (37.0 short tons; 33.1 long tons)
Career
- Operators: Norwegian State Railways
- Numbers: 67, 100–101
- Withdrawn: 1953
- Preserved: None, All scrapped

The NSB Type 12a, NSB Type 12b and NSB Type 12c were three steam locomotives built between 1891 and 1898 by Sächsische Maschinenfabrik and Dübs and Company for use on various railway lines in Norway. They were tank engines, which were useful so they wouldn't have to be turned around.

== History ==
The Norwegian railway lines, which were owned by the state, were administratively separate entities at the time. Locomotives were therefore permanently assigned to routes. It was not until July 1, 1920, that the Type 12 series steam locomotives, intended primarily for hauling local passenger trains, were officially assigned to the Oslo District.

=== NSB Type 12a ===
12a no. 67 (Dübs 2846) was built for local trains between Kristiania and Ljan on the Smaalensbane (SB). The locomotive was ordered on November 18, 1890. After delivery in October 1891, she was put in service in November. It was fitted with a Bissel bogie at the front and an Adams axle at the rear, and was a high-pressure, saturated steam locomotive.

This was the same design as the NSB Type 11, which was being constructed and supplied at the same time by Dübs and Company.

The locomotive was withdrawn on March 24, 1952, and then scrapped.

=== NSB Type 12b/12c ===
The other two locomotives—12c no. 100 and 12b no. 101—were ordered from the Sächsische Maschinenfabrik on February 23, 1897, and delivered on 1898 with factory numbers 2311 and 2312. From April 4, 1898, they were used on the Jaren–Røykenvik line belonging to the Kristiania–Gjøvikbanen (KGB) and had to run trains between Jaren and Røykenvik. Both locomotives were compound steam locomotives, unlike 12a no. 67. This locomotive type was further developed, and the successor was delivered to the Vossebane in 1904 as the Type 20.

12c no. 100 differed from 12b no. 101 slightly due to having larger water and coal capacity.

Both locomotives were put aside on October 25, 1951, Withdrawn on February 16, 1953, and then scrapped.

== General references ==
- T. Bjerke, TB Hansen, EW Johansson, S. Sando. Edited by Norwegian Railway Club. Oslo / Lillehammer / Trondheim 1987, ISBN 82-90286-09-0, S. 133–134 (Norwegian).
