= NSB Class 18 =

Class of Norwegian steam locomotives

NSB type 18
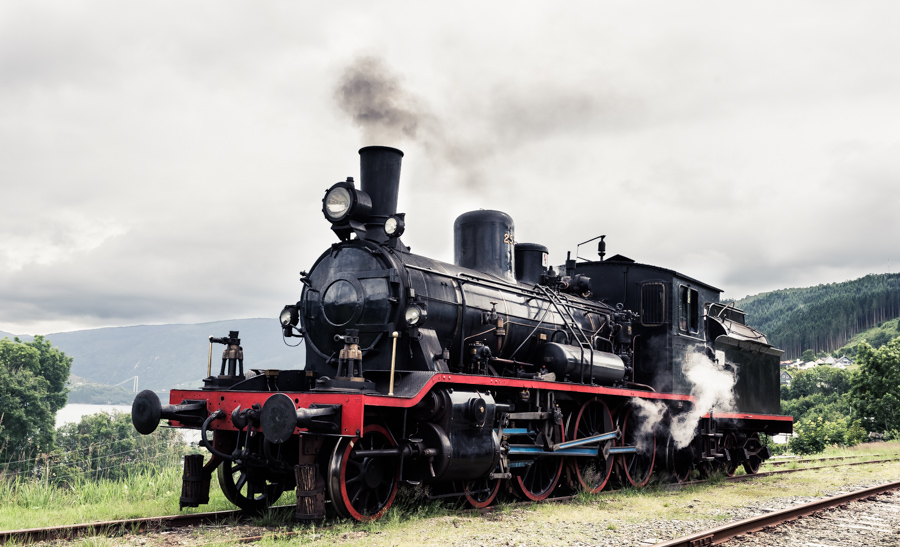
Type and origin
- Power type: Steam
- Builder: Sächsische Maschinenfabrik, Hamar
- Build date: 1900 - 1919
- Total produced: 35
Specifications
- Configuration
  - Whyte: 4-6-0
  - UIC: 2'C-2'2'
- Gauge: 4 ft 8 1/2 in (1,435 mm) standard gauge
- Driver dia.: 1,445 mm (4 ft 8.9 in)
- Wheelbase: 3,350 mm (11 ft 0 in)
- Length: 15,625 mm (51 ft 3.2 in)
- Height: 4,100 mm (13 ft 5 in)
- Loco weight: 18a45.8 t (50.5 short tons; 45.1 long tons); 18n46.6 t (51.4 short tons; 45.9 long tons); 18c: 46.7 t (51.5 short tons; 46.0 long tons)
- Tender weight: 13.7 t (15.1 short tons; 13.5 long tons)
- Total weight: 18a78.3 t (86.3 short tons; 77.1 long tons); 18b/c: 79.6 t (87.7 short tons; 78.3 long tons)
- Fuel type: Coal
- Fuel capacity: 3.5 t (3.9 short tons; 3.4 long tons)
- Water cap.: 11 m^{3} (2,400 imp gal)
- Firebox
  - Grate area: 1.9 m^{2} (20 sq ft)
- Heating surface
  - Firebox: 18a/b: 117.3 m^{2} (1,263 sq ft); 18c: 94.1 m^{2} (1,013 sq ft)
- Superheater
  - Heating area: 18c: 29.4 m^{2} (316 sq ft)
- Cylinders: 2
- Cylinder size: 18c: 480 mm × 650 mm (19 in × 26 in)
- High-pressure cylinder: 18a/b: 450 mm × 650 mm (18 in × 26 in)
- Low-pressure cylinder: 18a/b: 670 mm × 650 mm (26 in × 26 in)
Performance figures
- Maximum speed: Forward: 18a/b:60 km/h (37 mph); 18c: 65 km/h (40 mph); Reverse: 50 km/h (31 mph)
- Power output: 825 hp (615 kW)
- Factor of adh.: 18a35.1 t (38.7 short tons; 34.5 long tons); 18b/c: 36 t (40 short tons; 35 long tons)
Career
- Operators: Norwegian State Railways
- Numbers: 131–138, 157–158, 184–189, 211–214, 226, 231–233, 241–246, 255, 267, 298, 310–311
- Withdrawn: 1969
- Preserved: one preserved, remainder scrapped

The NSB type 18 was a 2'C (4–6–0) built between 1900 and 1919 by Sächsische Maschinenfabrik and Hamar Jernstøberi for the Norwegian state railway (NSB).

== NSB Type 18a ==
The saturated compounded locomotives of type 18a were used on the northern railways Røykenvikbanen (Jaren - Røykenvik), Gjøvikbanen (Grefsen - Gjøvik) and Skreiabanen (Reinsvoll - Skreia). The first eight locomotives nos. 131–134 were built by the Sächsische Maschinenfabrik in 1900, nos. 135–138 followed in 1901 and nos. 157 and 158 were built by Hamar Jernstøberi in 1903. Eight of the ten locomotives, with the exception of nos. 135 and 157, were later fitted with superheaters and simple expansion and were re-designated as the type 18c. Locomotive no. 138 was displayed at the Paris World Exhibition in 1900.

== NSB Type 18b ==
The Type 18b were saturated compounded locomotives as well, built by Hamar Jernstøberi in 1907. The six locomotives were intended for use in the area around Gjøvik and for the Bergensbane. They had road numbers 184 to 189. The locomotives were based in Bergen, Hamar, Trondheim, Kristiansand and Arendal. They were also used on the Eidsvoll - Otta and Otta - Dombås sections of the Dovre line. No. 184 was rebuilt onto an 18c in 1938 and No. 186 in 1948. A these two engines were withdrawn in 1962.

== NSB Type 18c ==
The type 18c was slightly heavier than the previous types and had an enlarged cylinder diameter. No compounding was used on the 18c, and was originally built superheaters. They were also built by Hamar Jernstøberi. They were later replaced by more powerful locomotives in mainline service and were put on branch line services. No. 134 was the oldest type 18c in service from 1964 until it was withdrawn in 1968.

== Preservation ==
The last NSB type 18c no. 255 locomotive built in 1913 by Hamar Jernstøberi was withdrawn on 25 August 1969 and has since been preserved by the Bergen Technical Museum. This locomotive was restored in from 1980 to 1992 by the Norsk Jernbaneklubb and is in service at the Gamle Vossebanen where it is in operation every summer. no. 255 was originally allocated to the Eidsvold – Ottabanen, but was reallocated to the Drammen, Oslo and Trondheim districts, where after the latter it ran the line between Grong Station and Namsos Station.

== See also ==
- List of locomotives at the Paris World Fair in 1900
