= DB 601 =

DB 601 may refer to:

- Daimler-Benz DB 601, a V12 reciprocating aircraft engine of the 1930s and 1940s
- DB Class 601, the power heads or locomotives used for Trans Europ Express trains in Germany
