= Type 11 =

Type 11 may refer to:

- Type 11 assault rifle, Thai copy of HK33
- Type 11 light machine gun, Japanese light machine gun
- Type 11 (missile), a Japanese surface-to-air missile
- Type 11 37 mm infantry gun, a Japanese gun
- Type 11 75 mm AA gun, a Japanese anti-aircraft gun
- Type 11 70 mm infantry mortar, a Japanese mortar
- 14 cm/40 11th Year Type naval gun, a Japanese naval gun
- Datsun Type 11, a small car manufactured by Datsun/Nissan

== See also ==
- Class 11 (disambiguation)
