= LNER Class Y11 =

Class of petrol powered 0-4-0 locomotives

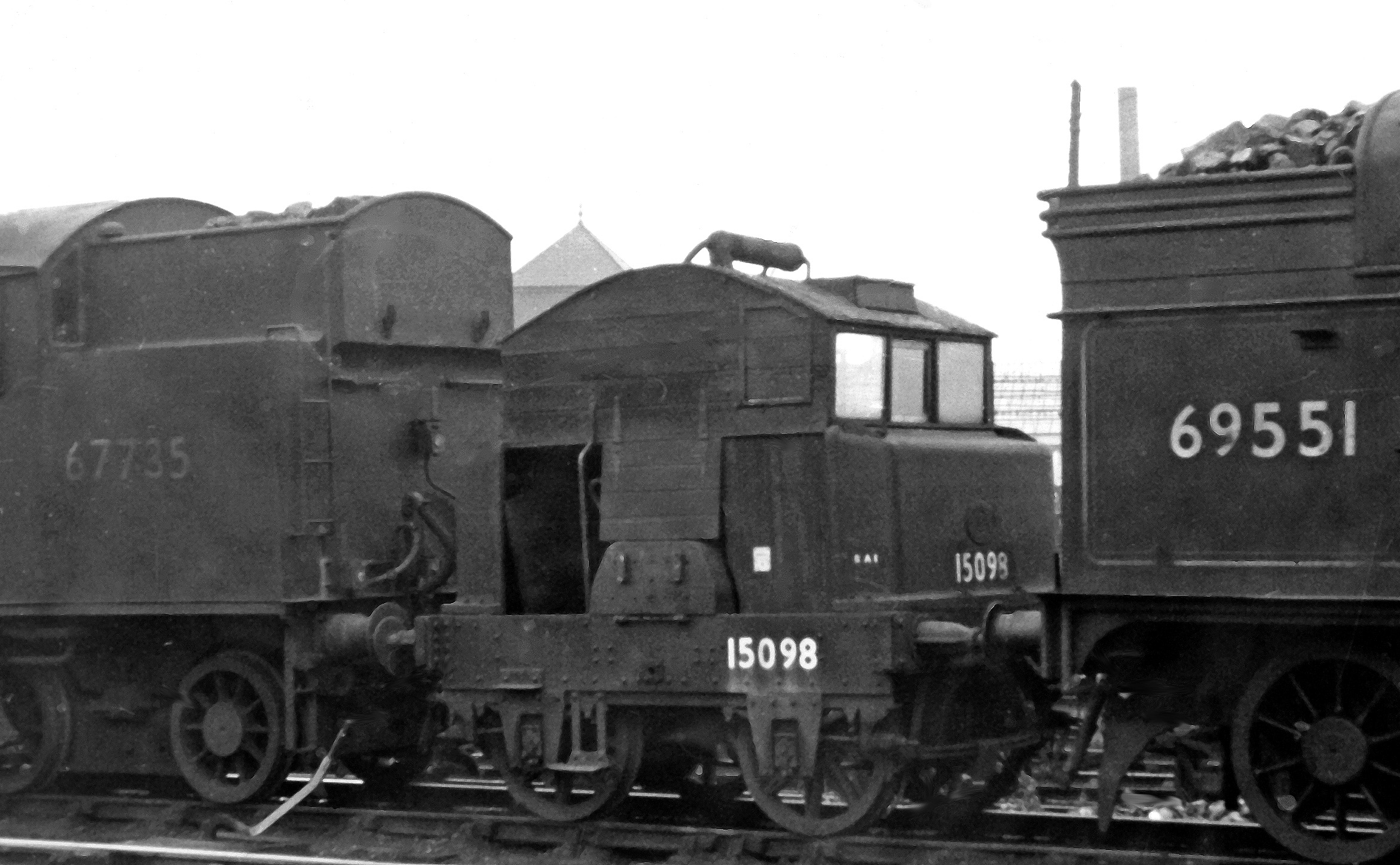
- 15098 at Stratford locomotive depot 1956
Type and origin
- Power type: Petrol-mechanical
- Builder: Motor Rail & Tram Car Co. Ltd.
- Model: Simplex
- Build date: 1919, 1920, 1925
Specifications
- Configuration
  - Whyte: 4wPM
  - UIC: B
- Wheel diameter: 3 ft 1 in (0.940 m)
- Loco weight: 8 long tons (8.1 t)
- Prime mover: Dorman 4JO
- Engine type: Petrol
- Transmission: Mechanical, two-speed Dixon-Abbot, chain final drive
- Loco brake: Air
- Train brakes: None
Performance figures
- Maximum speed: 7.2 mph (11.6 km/h)
- Power output: 40 hp (30 kW)
- Tractive effort: 3,750 lbf (16.7 kN)
Career
- Operators: Great Eastern Railway, North British Railway, London and North Eastern Railway, British Railways
- Number in class: 3
- Axle load class: Route Availability: 1
- Retired: 1950–1956
- Disposition: All scrapped

LNER Class Y11 was a class of three petrol powered 0-4-0 locomotives built by Motor Rail & Tram Car Company Limited under their Simplex brand and introduced in the years 1919–1925. Two were inherited by the London and North Eastern Railway (LNER) at its formation in January 1923, and a third was purchased later. Their British Railways numbers were 15097-15099. It was known as LNER Z6 before 1943.

== History ==
The Great Eastern Railway (GER) bought a Simplex petrol locomotive from Motor Rail (works no. 1931) in December 1919, for shunting in the engineer's yard at Lowestoft Harbour. This was not numbered by the GER, and initially remained unnumbered when it passed to the LNER when that railway was created by the amalgamation of the GER with the North British Railway (NBR) and other railways. It was recorded as being in "miscellaneous stock".

The NBR bought a Simplex petrol locomotive from Motor Rail (works no. 2037) in February 1921 for £1,200, or £50,790 as of 2025. (Note: UK Consumer Price Index inflation figures from 1209–2024 based on data from "Inflation calculator". Bank of England. London. 18 February 2026.) It was used in the goods yard at Kelso, where shunting had previously been performed using horses. Its haulage capacity was five loaded or nine empty wagons. The NBR designated it "Petrol Engine No. 1", and it initially retained this designation when the LNER was formed.

Shortly after the grouping, the LNER gave the classification Z6 to the ex-NBR locomotive, and temporarily transferred it to Brentwood for trials, after which it was returned to Kelso in October 1923. The LNER moved the ex-GER locomotive from Lowestoft to Brentwood in September 1925, and transferred it from miscellaneous stock to running stock, for which it was allotted the number 8430, but this was not applied until July 1930. The ex-NBR locomotive was subsequently tried at other locations, including Connah's Quay from June 1928, and Ware from August 1928. The transfer to Ware was made permanent in July 1930, when it was numbered 8431. The classification Z6 ceased to be used at some point, and they were then known simply as petrol shunters. In December 1943, they were given the new classification Y11.

In the meantime a third Simplex petrol locomotive was bought by the LNER from Motor Rail. This had been built in 1922 (works no. 2126) for Preston Water Works, which sold it back to the makers in 1925, who refurbished it and sold it (as works no. 3783) to the LNER in August 1925. The LNER used it at Greenland Creosote Works, West Hartlepool. By September 1938 it had been numbered L4. British Railways (BR) inherited it with the rest of the LNER locomotives at the start of 1948, and in May 1949 transferred it from miscellaneous stock to departmental stock, giving it the number 15097. One other number was allotted, but not applied: LNER no. 8434, possibly in 1930. It was withdrawn in June 1950.

No. 8430 remained at Brentwood until its withdrawal in September 1956, during which time it was renumbered twice: to 8188 by the LNER in July 1946, and to 15098 by BR in May 1949. Two other numbers were allotted, but not applied: LNER no. 7591 in 1942, and BR 68188 in 1948. No. 8431 remained at Ware until its withdrawal in September 1956, during which time it was renumbered three times: to 8189 by the LNER in June 1946, to 68189 by British Railways (BR) in December 1948, and to 15099 in May 1949. One other number was allotted, but not applied: LNER no. 7592 in 1942.

== Specification ==
- Wheel arrangement: 0-4-0
- Weight: 8 long tons (8.1 t; 9.0 short tons)
- Wheel diameter: 3 ft 1 in (940 mm)
- Min curve negotiable: 1 ch (66 ft; 20 m)
- Engine type: Dorman 4JO (petrol)
- Engine output: 40 hp (30 kW)
- Power at rail: 24 hp (18 kW)
- Maximum speed: 7.2 mph (11.6 km/h)
- Brake type: Air on loco, no train brake
- Route Availability: 1
- Heating type: Not fitted
- Multiple coupling type: Not fitted
- Transmission: Mechanical, 2-speed Dixon Abbot

== Preservation ==
None of the LNER Class Y11 locomotives has been preserved but several similar ones have, including:

- Works no. 2029 at the East Anglian Railway Museum
- Works no. 2028 at the Nottingham Transport Heritage Centre

Nottingham Transport Heritage Centre also has another Simplex numbered 15100. This is probably an "imaginary" British Railways number, continuing from 15099.
