= Molière (train) =

Overview
- Service type: Trans Europ Express (TEE) (1973–1979); InterCity(IC) (1980–1983); D train (1983–1986); EuroCity(EC) (1987–1997)
- Locale: Germany; Belgium; France
- Predecessor: TEE Paris - Ruhr
- First service: 3 June 1973
- Last service: 14 December 1997
- Current operator(s): SNCF

Technical
- Track gauge: 1,435 mm (4 ft 8 1/2 in)
- Electrification: 25 kV 50 Hz (France); 3000 V DC (Belgium); 15 kV 16,7 Hz (Germany)
Route map
- TEE Molière (red) and the later Thalys (blue)

The Molière was an international train operated by SNCF, initially linking Paris and Düsseldorf. The train was named after Jean Baptiste Poquelin, using his stage name.

== Trans Europ Express ==
The Molière was the successor of Paris-to-Düsseldorf section of the TEE Paris–Ruhr, on the same route and schedule. The name Paris–Ruhr was no longer accurate because the deletion of the Düsseldorf-to-Dortmund section in 1971 meant that the train no longer served the Ruhr.

TEE 40	country	station	km	TEE 41
06:55	Germany	Düsseldorf	0	23:11
07:21	Germany	Cologne	40	22:44
08:04	Germany	Aachen	110	21:57
	Belgium	Verviers	140	
08:50	Belgium	Liège	165	21:10
09:32	Belgium	Namur	225	20:34
	Belgium	Charleroi Sud	262	
10:29	France	Maubeuge	304	19:36
**:**	France	St Quentin	379	
12:10	France	Paris Nord	533	17:55

On 1 June 1975 the route was shortened further, to Cologne, resulting in a length just under the economic optimal distance of 500 km. From 28 May 1978 the Molière called in St. Quentin in both directions. On 1 October 1978 the weekend services were scrapped, and on 26 May 1979 the Molière made its last journey as a TEE.

== D train ==
On 27 May 1979 the Molière was continued as two-class D-train on the same schedule as the TEE. The train consisted of SNCF Corail coaches. In 1980 the train was upgraded to InterCity with train numbers IC 430,431. In May 1983 the route was extended to Copenhagen, conveying sleeping and couchette coaches. This nighttrain became the numbers D 430,431 calling at: København H – Naestved – Nykøbing – Rødby Færge – Puttgarden – Lübeck – Hamburg – Bremen – Osnabrück – Münster – Hamm – Dortmund – Bochum – Essen – Duisburg – Düsseldorf – Köln – Aachen – Verviers – Liège-G. – Namur – Charleroi-Sud – Maubeuge – St. Quentin – Paris-Nord. In May 1986 the route was shortened to Cologne - Paris again, so only a day service remained.

== EuroCity ==
On 31 May 1987 the Molière was upgraded to EuroCity status. The EC service was initially allocated train numbers EC 40 and EC 41, and the northern terminus became Dortmund instead of Düsseldorf. According to the EuroCity scheduling, the train was part of a trio. Together with EC Gustave Eiffel and EC Parsifal it provided three EC services daily in each direction between Paris and the Ruhr.

EC 40	country	station	km	EC 41
06:50	Germany	Dortmund Hbf		23:44
	Germany	Bochum Hbf		
	Germany	Essen Hbf		
	Germany	Duisburg Hbf		
	Germany	Düsseldorf		
	Germany	Cologne		
	Germany	Aachen		
	Belgium	Verviers		
	Belgium	Liège		
	Belgium	Namur		
	Belgium	Charleroi Sud		
	France	Maubeuge		
	France	St Quentin		
13:40	France	Paris Nord		16:47

On 23 May 1993 the train was renumbered to EC 30,31. On 14 December 1997 the Molière was replaced by the Paris – Cologne Thalys service.

== Works cited ==
- Hajt, Jörg (2001). Das grosse TEE Buch (in German). Bonn/Königswinter: Heel Verlag. ISBN 3-89365-948-X.
- Mertens, Maurice; Malaspina, Jean-Pierre (2007). La Légende des Trans Europ Express (in French). Vannes: LR Presse. ISBN 978-29-036514-5-9.
- Goette, Peter (2008). TEE-Züge in Deutschland (in German). Freiburg: EK-Verlag. ISBN 978-3-88255-698-8.
