= Parsifal (train) =

Overview
- Service type: Trans Europ Express (TEE) (1957–1979); D-Zug (1979–1983); InterCity (IC) (1983–1987); EuroCity (TEE) (1987–2002)
- Status: Discontinued
- Locale: France; Belgium; Germany
- First service: 3 October 1957
- Last service: 14 December 1997
- Former operator(s): Deutsche Bundesbahn; SNCF

Route
- Termini: Paris; Hamburg
- Distance travelled: 971 km
- Service frequency: Daily

Technical
- Track gauge: 1,435 mm (4 ft 8 1/2 in)
- Electrification: 25 kV AC (France); 3000 V DC (Belgium); 15 kV 16,7 Hz (Germany)
Route map
- TEE Parsifal (red) and its successor Thalys (blue)

The Parsifal was an express train that linked Paris with Dortmund in Germany and later Cologne. The train was named after Wagner's opera inspired by the legendary knight Percival.

== History ==
=== Trans Europ Express ===
Changing routes through the Ruhr

The Parsifal was launched on 3 October 1957 as second TEE-service between Paris and the Ruhr. The Parsifal was scheduled as the "mirror" of the Paris-Ruhr. While the Paris-Ruhr started westbound in the morning and eastbound in the evening, the Parsifal started eastbound in the morning and returned to Paris in the evening. Initially French RGP-825 trainsets were used. On 29 May 1960 the Parsifal was extended to Hamburg. Due to the new length of the route two trains were needed to operate this service. In order to level out the kilometer fees the rolling stock was switched with the Paris-Ruhr, so the extra kilometers in Germany were ridden by German trains without the need to pay kilometer fees for foreign tracks. The DB Class VT 11.5 was used until 28 September 1968 when the rolling stock was replaced by electric-locomotive hauled trains. From 30 May 1965 until 22 May 1966, the Parsifal was coupled with the Diamant between Liège and Essen.

=== Schnellzug / InterCity ===
In September 1978 it was decided to offer second-class on the Hamburg - Paris link, which meant that the TEE criteria were no longer met. On 25 May 1979 the second-class coaches were added to the train and the service was continued as D-Zug. On 29 May 1983 the train was upgraded to an InterCity service.

=== EuroCity ===
On 31 May 1987 with the start of the EuroCity network the EC Parsifal was one of the initial services, although its route was reduced to the Paris – Cologne section. In order to tackle one of the TEE problems, only one train a day, the EC Parsifal was one of three train-pairs; the others were EC Molière and EC Gustave Eiffel, providing a morning, afternoon and evening EuroCity service in both directions. However, the Gustave Eiffel soon lost its EC status, after only one year.

On 14 December 1997 the Parsifal was replaced by the Paris – Cologne Thalys service.

== Works cited ==
- Centre for publicrelations UIC (1972). TEE (in Dutch). Paris: Union International des Chemins de Fer.
- Hajt, Jörg (2001). Das grosse TEE Buch (in German). Bonn/Königswinter: Heel Verlag. ISBN 3-89365-948-X.
- Mertens, Maurice; Malaspina, Jean-Pierre (2007). La Légende des Trans Europ Express (in French). Vannes: LR Presse. ISBN 978-29-036514-5-9.
- Goette, Peter (2008). TEE-Züge in Deutschland (in German). Freiburg: EK-Verlag. ISBN 978-3-88255-698-8.
