= Paris–Ruhr =

Train service

Overview
- Service type: Fernschnellzug (F) (1954–57); Trans Europ Express (TEE) (1957–73)
- Status: Discontinued
- Locale: France; Belgium; Germany
- First service: 23 May 1954
- Last service: 1 June 1973
- Successor: TEE Molière
- Former operators: Deutsche Bundesbahn; SNCF

Route
- Termini: Paris; Dortmund
- Distance travelled: 609 km
- Service frequency: Daily

On-board services
- Catering facilities: Restaurant car

Technical
- Track gauge: 1,435 mm (4 ft 8 1/2 in)
- Electrification: 25 kV 50 Hz (France); 3000 V DC (Belgium); 15 kV 16,7 Hz (Germany)
Route map
- TEE Paris–Ruhr (red) and the later Thalys (blue)

The Paris–Ruhr was an express train that linked Paris in France, with Dortmund in Germany. The train was named after its two termini, Paris in the west and the Ruhr district in the east. For most of its life, it was a Trans Europ Express (TEE).

== F-Zug ==
The Paris–Ruhr was launched on 23 May 1954 as a single-class express train with train numbers FT 168 westbound and FT 185 eastbound. The schedule was designed to allow a traveller to attend a meeting in Paris in the afternoon and have dinner on his way back just after leaving Paris. This concept meant a departure from Dortmund as early as 5:30 in the morning and not arriving back in Dortmund until 00:45 (12:45 a.m.). Times from Cologne and the Belgian industrial cities in Wallonia were more convenient, with westbound departure between 7:00 and 10:15, returning from Paris between 7:30 p.m and 11:00 p.m. The service was operated by Deutsche Bundesbahn, originally using Class VT 08 diesel multiple units.

== Trans Europ Express ==
On 2 June 1957, the Paris–Ruhr was one of the initial Trans Europ Express (TEE) services. The rolling stock was given TEE signage on front but the use of VT 08 continued because the German TEE trainsets planned for it were not available in time. The timetable remained nearly unchanged as well. On 23 December 1957, the VT 08 were replaced by first-class DB Class VT 11.5 trainsets that were purpose-built for the TEE network. On 29 May 1960, the "mirror" of the Paris–Ruhr, the Parsifal was extended to Hamburg. In order to level-out the kilometer fees the French rolling stock used in the Parsifal was reallocated to the Paris–Ruhr and vice versa, so the extra kilometers in Germany were ridden by German trains without the need to pay kilometer fees for foreign tracks. As a result, the Paris–Ruhr was operated by French RGP-825 DMUs from 29 May 1960 until 30 May 1965.

Electrification in Germany proceeded and at the beginning of 1965 electric locomotives and TEE coaches were delivered. The rolling stock of the TEE Helvetia was replaced by electric-locomotive-hauled trains and its VT 11.5s were reallocated to the Paris–Ruhr. After completion of electrification in Belgium, the Paris-Ruhr was changed to an electric-locomotive-hauled train as well, on 1 June 1969. On 3 June 1973, the service was renamed the TEE Molière.

== Works cited ==
- Centre for public relations UIC (1972). TEE (in Dutch). Paris: Union International des Chemins de Fer.
- Hajt, Jörg (2001). Das grosse TEE Buch (in German). Bonn/Königswinter: Heel Verlag. ISBN 3-89365-948-X.
- Mertens, Maurice; Malaspina, Jean-Pierre (2007). La Légende des Trans Europ Express (in French). Vannes: LR Presse. ISBN 978-29-036514-5-9.
- Goette, Peter (2008). TEE-Züge in Deutschland (in German). Freiburg: EK-Verlag. ISBN 978-3-88255-698-8.
