= NSB Class 11 =

Class of Norwegian steam locomotives

NSB Type 11
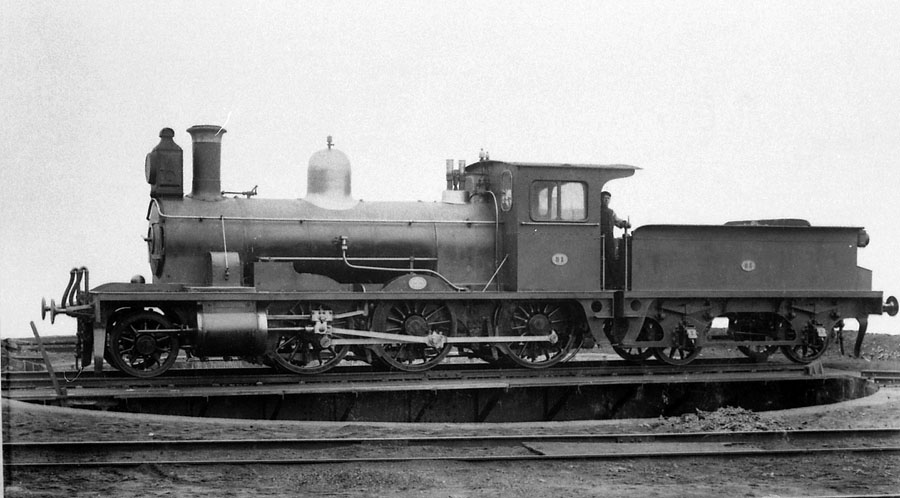
Type and origin
- Power type: Steam
- Builder: Dübs, Nylands mekaniske verksted
- Build date: 1891, 1898
- Total produced: 12
Specifications
- Configuration
  - Whyte: 2-6-0
  - UIC: 11a: 1’C-2 n2 11b/c: 1’C-2 n2v 11d: 1’C-2 h2 11e: 1’C-2 h2 11f: 1’C-2 h2v
- Gauge: 4 ft 8 1/2 in (1,435 mm) standard gauge
- Driver dia.: 1,448 mm (4 ft 9.0 in)
- Wheelbase: 3,810 mm (12 ft 6 in)
- Length: 14,428 mm (47 ft 4.0 in)
- Fuel type: Coal
- Boiler pressure: 11a/e: 10 kg/cm^{2} (140 psi); 11b/c/d/f: 12 kg/cm^{2} (170 psi)
- Cylinders: 2
Performance figures
- Maximum speed: Forward: 60 km/h (37 mph); Reverse: 40 km/h (25 mph)
Career
- Operators: Norwegian State Railways
- Numbers: 64–66, 75–83
- Withdrawn: 1953
- Preserved: None, All scrapped

The NSB Type 11 were locomotives with the wheel arrangement 1'C (2–6–0), which were built between 1891 and 1896 by Dübs and Company in Glasgow and Nylands mekaniske verksted in Oslo in twelve examples in different versions for Norwegian state railway. Three locomotives were rebuilt into the Type 15d and Type 15h series. In the early days, its main use was on goods trains.

== History ==
The Type 11 was one of three series of steam locomotives that NSB procured at the same time in 1891 for use on lighter laid standard-gauge line. The series was intended for goods trains, while the Type 12 were intended for local trains and the Type 13 for long-distance passenger trains. Overall, the three locomotives nos. 64 to 66 were ordered first.

The three types of locomotives had many things in common and were designed in close cooperation between the State Railways Engine Manager Oxaal and Dübs and Company. The type 12 was a tank engine version of the Type 11. They had identical boilers and tenders.

After the first delivery, another three locomotives were ordered from Dübs. They were built as compounded steam locomotives, which were standard steam locomotive technology at the time of construction in 1893. The change in design increased the locomotive weight compared to 11a.

Unlike some other railway lines in Norway which were narrow gauge the Solørbanen and Gudbrandsdalsbanen north of Hamar were constructed as standard gauge, as so-called “lett normalsporet bane”.

Four locomotives were built in Norway by Nylands mekaniske verksted in Christiania, which is known as a shipyard. The workshop briefly tried its hand at building locomotives in the 1890s.

Like many other Norwegian saturated steam locomotives, the type 11 was built between 1890 and 1910, but some locomotives were not modernized until after the First World War.

=== NSB Type 11a ===
The first three locomotives of this series (Dübs nos. 2843 to 2845) were ordered on November 18, 1890. They were staturated steam locomotives with simple expansion (1'C-2 n2). They were grouped into class 11a.

The delivery took place in 1891. The three locomotives were divided. No. 64 was delivered to the Eidsvoll-Hamarbanen, No. 65 to the Kongsvingerbane and No. 66 to the Smaalensbane.

All three locomotives were rebuilt, the first was no. 65 in October 1918 to type 11e, no. 64 followed in January 1923. and in 1919 no. 66 was converted to type 11d.

=== NSB Type 11b ===
The second batch of three locomotives where built as compounded locomotives (1'C-2 n2v). They were built at Dübs with construction nos. 3027 to 3029, delivered in 1893 and designated 11b nos. 75 to 77. They had a service weight of 55t.

They were followed by a further order for two locomotives, built by Nyland in January 1896 with construction nos. 5 and 6 and put into service as 11b no. 82 on 19 February 1896 and 11b no. 83 on 10 February 1896.

No. 75 was delivered to the Kongsvinger–Flisenbane, Nos. 76 and 77 were delivered to the Eidsvold–Ottabane.

11b no. 83 was reclassified as type 11f in February 1925 after having a superheater fitted.

A renumbering from No. 77 to No. 76 on May 6, 1930, is unclear, since according to the available documents both locomotives were parked in December 1932 and retired on February 18, 1933. Locomotive no. 82 remained in service until 1944.

=== NSB Type 11c ===
After the first batch of 11bs delivered by Dübs, another order followed in 1893 largely to the same design, but with a larger heating surface and a large tender with an increased water capacity. This increased the service weight from 55t to 58.1t. In 1893 the two locomotives 11c nos. 78 and 79 built by Dübs (3030 and 3031) were delivered and put into service in July. Nyland delivered locomotives 11c nos. 80 and 81, built with construction numbers 3 and 4, in 1894, and they were put into service in March.

11c nos. 78 and 79 were sent to the Eidsvold–Ottabane and the Smaalensbane. At the Eidsvold-Ottabane they worked the line between Eidsvoll and Hamar.

Locomotives nos. 78 to 80 were withdrawn in 1928, No. 81 remained in service until 1935.

=== NSB Type 11d ===
Locomotive 11a no. 66 was rebuilt into a 11d in 1919. She received a new boiler with superheater, larger cylinders with a diameter of 432 mm. The superheater area was 18.4 m2. The sides of the tender were raised, and the locomotive received a new cab, so that it resembled the Type 21 with a four-wheel tender and an extended wheelbase between the second and third axle.

The locomotive was put into storage on November 26, 1954, and fully withdrawn on January 17, 1955.

=== NSB Type 11e ===
The Type 11e was created in 1918 by using thinner superheater tubes compared to the standard tubes. These were called Smårøroverheter. The two oldest locomotives, by rebuilding, no. 64 in January 1923 and no. 65 in October 1918.

More locomotives were rebuilt no. 65 in 1931 and no. 64 in 1932, they received larger 432 mm diameter cylinders and a six-wheel tender. This measure resulted in the redesignation as the Type 15h.

=== NSB Type 11f ===
The type 11f was the result of fitting 11c no. 83 with a superheater, but retaining the compounding and flat slide valves. This was done in 1925. However, this was considered a bad decision by the staff, who called such locomotives bastards. The locomotive was finally rebuilt as a simple expansion and with round slide valves in 1941. The locomotive was paired with a six-wheel tender in November 1931 and redesignated as Type 15d.

=== NSB Type 11g ===
There were plans to rebuild another locomotive with a superheater, which would have become the type 11g, but was decided against in the end.

== Technical Data ==
	11a	11b	11c	11d	11e	11f
Cyl size	406 mm (16 in)	425 mm (16.7 in) / 635 mm (25 in)		432 mm (17 in)	406 mm (16 in)	425 mm (16.7 in) / 635 mm (25 in)
Stroke	610 mm (24 in)					
	11a	11b	11c	11d	11e	11f
Firegrate area	1.3 m2 (14 sq ft)					
Heating surface	82.3 m2 (886 sq ft)	76.4 m2 (822 sq ft)	80.7 m2 (869 sq ft)	66.8 m2 (719 sq ft)	71.2 m2 (766 sq ft)	62.2 m2 (670 sq ft)
Superheater erea	-	-	-	18.4 m2 (198 sq ft)	45 m2 (480 sq ft)	16.3 m2 (175 sq ft)
	11a	11b	11c	11d	11e	11f
Adhesion weight	28.6t (31.5 Short tons, 28.1 long tons)	28.3t (31.2 short tons, 27.9 long tons	29.6t (33.6 Short tons, 29.1 long tons)	30.3t (33.4 short tons, 29.8 long tons)	28.6t (31.5 Short tons, 28.1 long tons)	28.3t (31.2 short tons, 27.9 long tons
Service weight	56.7t (62.5 short tons, 55.8 long tons)	55t (61 short tons, 54 long tons)	58.1t (64 short tons, 57.2 long tons)	59.5t (66.6 short tons, 58.6 long tons)	56.7t (62.5 short tons, 55.8 long tons)	55t (61 short tons, 54 long tons)
Loco weight	32.5t (35.8 Short tons, 32 long tons)	32.7t (36 Short tons, 32.2 long tons)	33.5t (36.9 Short tons, 33 long tons)	33.8t (37.3 Short tons, 33.3 long tons)	32.5t (35.8 Short tons, 32 long tons)	Unknown
Tender weight	11.4t (12.6 Short tons, 11.2 long tons)	11.6t (12.8 Short tons, 11.4 long tons)	11.4t (12.6 Short tons, 11.2 long tons)	11.6t (12.8 Short tons, 11.4 long tons)	11.4t (12.6 Short tons, 11.2 long tons)	11.6t (12.8 Short tons, 11.4 long tons)
Fuel capacity	2.5t (2.8 Short tons, 2.5 long tons)					
Water capacity	7 m3 (1500 imp gal)	7.7 m3 (1700 imp gal)	7 m3 (1500 imp gal)	5.4 m3 (1200 imp gal)	7 m3 (1500 imp gal)	7.7 m3 (1700 imp gal)

== Use ==
The locomotive was designed as a goods engine, but proved suitable for passenger trains at moderate speeds as well. It proved itself to be a versatile engine, but was preferably used on lines that could not withstand heavier locomotives. In later years, the locomotives were often used on works trains. No. 66, was used for the construction of the Nordlandsbanen in the 1930s, supposedly transported by ship to Mosjøen to be used for track-laying to the south.

== Withdrawal ==
The withdrawal and scrapping of the non-converted locomotives began as early as 1928 (Nos. 78–80), after 35 years of service. In 1945 all locomotives that had not been converted were withdrawn.

Only the converted 11d no. 66 remained. The three other locomotives had been converted to Type 15s by paired with a 6-wheel tender. No. 66 was withdrawn at the end of the 1954 railway anniversary year and officially scrapped on January 17, 1955. No. 83 lasted the longest, until September 1956, but then as type 15f.
