= Røykenvik Line =

Railway line in Norway

Overview
- Native name: Røykenvikbanen
- Status: Abandoned
- Owner: Norwegian State Railways
- Termini: Jaren Station; Røykenvik

Service
- Type: Railway
- System: Norwegian railway
- Operator(s): Norwegian State Railways

History
- Opened: 1900
- Closed: 1957

Technical
- Line length: 7 km
- Number of tracks: Single
- Character: Passenger and freight
- Track gauge: 1,435 mm (4 ft 8 1/2 in)

The Røykenvik Line (Norwegian: Røykenvikbanen) was a 7 km railway branch line between Jaren and Røykenvik.

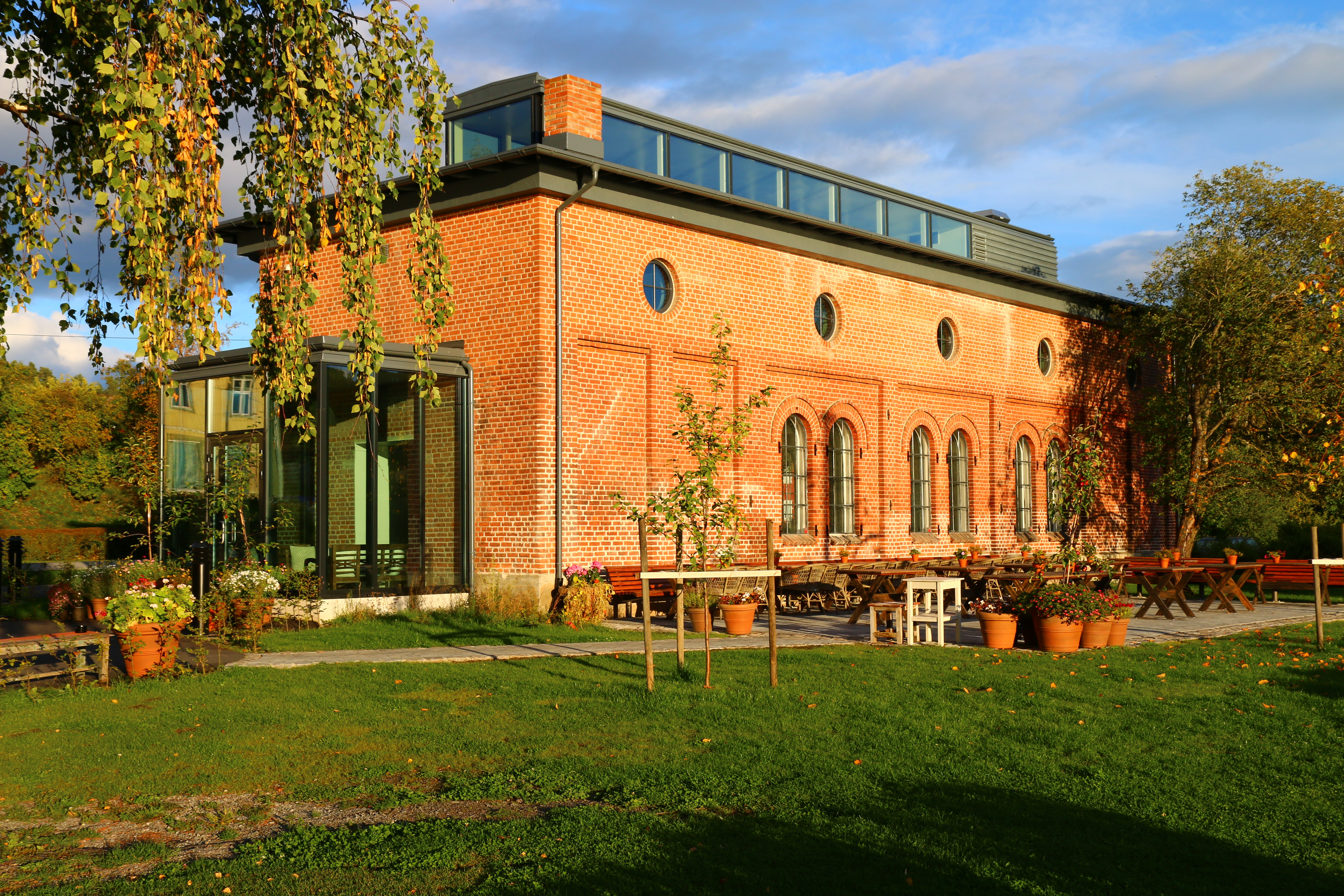
Former station house in Røykenvik

== History ==
The line was constructed as the original terminal stretch of the Gjøvik Line (then known as the North Line) in 1900 until the extension to Gjøvik was opened in 1902. From then the line was a branch line, which offered connection with a steam ship on Randsfjorden. Passenger traffic on the line was discontinued in 1949 and the line officially abandoned on 1 November 1957. The tracks were later removed and the corridor is now part of Route 34.
