= Røykenvik Station =

Former railway station in Gran, Norway

Røykenvik
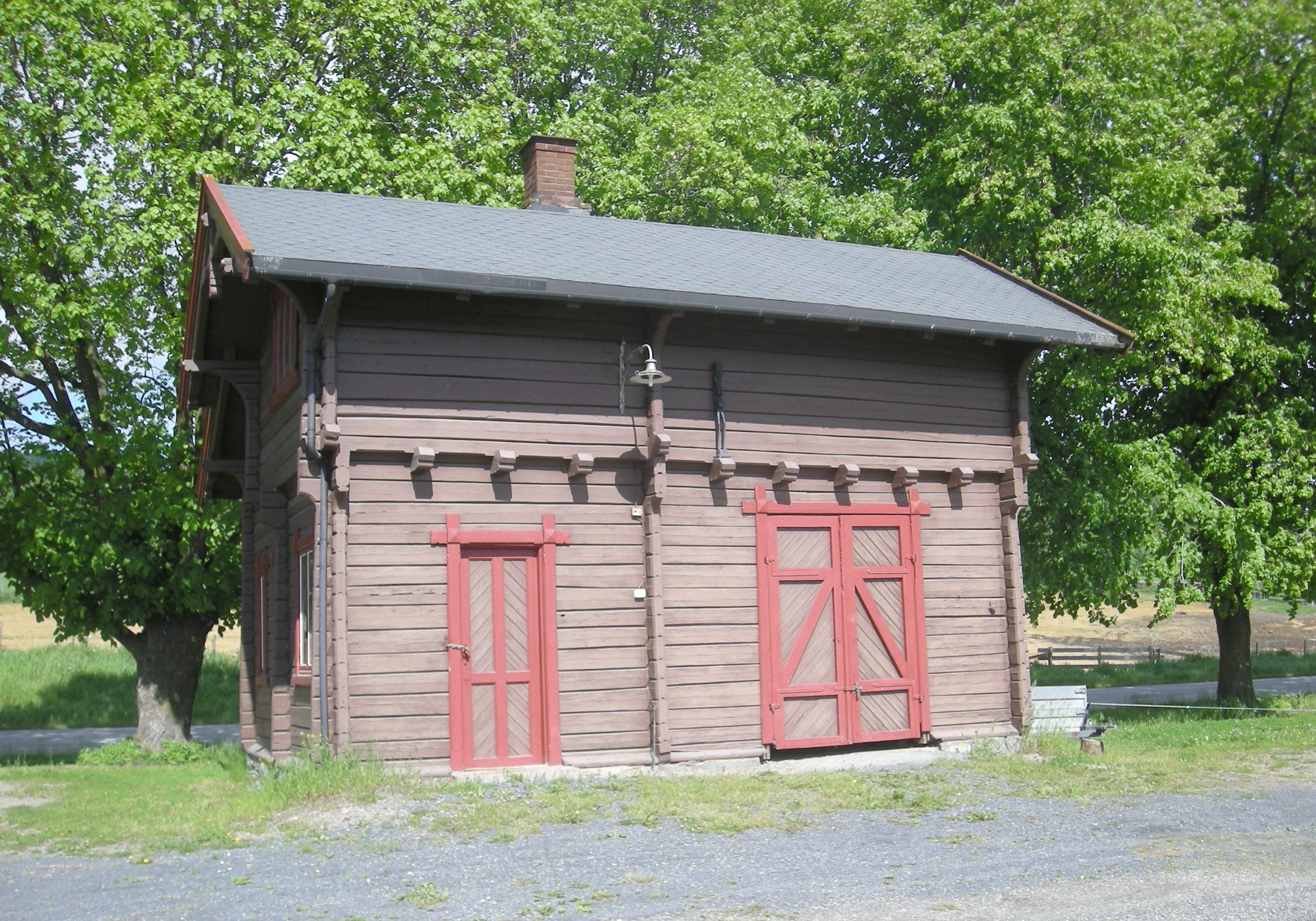
- Preserved station building.

General information
- Location: Røykenvik, Gran Municipality; Norway
- Coordinates: 60°25′48″N 10°28′21″E
- Elevation: 137.6 m (451 ft)
- Owner: Norwegian State Railways
- Operator: Norwegian State Railways
- Line: Røykenvik Line
- Distance: 78.61 km

History
- Opened: 20 December 1900
Location

Røykenvik Station (Norwegian: Røykenvik stasjon) was the terminal station of the Røykenvik Line. Located in Gran Municipality, Norway, it opened on 20 December 1900 as part of the North Line. The station was first called Røikenvik, but changed to the current spelling in April 1924. The station was a changeover from train to steam ship. It was eventually closed along with the Røykenvik Line.

== Name ==
The station is named after a nearby inlet in Randsfjorden. The first element is the name of the old farm Røyken (Old Norse: Raukvin), the last element is vik which means 'inlet' or 'cove'. For the meaning of the farm name see Røyken Municipality.

Preceding station		Following station
Brandbu	Røykenvik Line	—
