= DB Class VT 11.5 =

German diesel multiple unit

DB VT 11.5 DB Classes 601 and 901
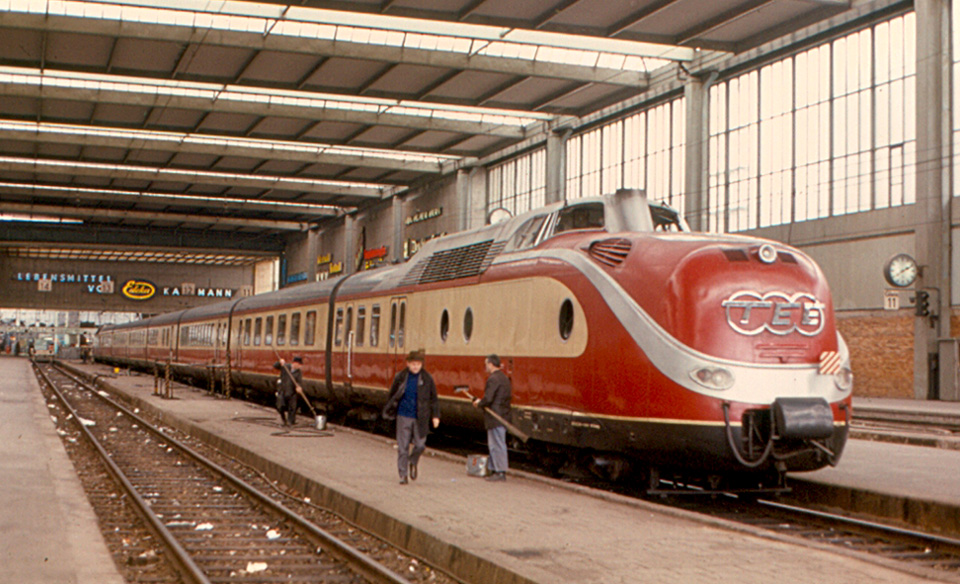
- Class 601 in TEE livery, 1970 Munich Hauptbahnhof
- In service: 1957 to 1988 (DB) or 1991 (DR)
- Manufacturers: MAN, LHB, Wegmann
- Constructed: 1957
- Number built: 19 power cars; 48 trailer cars
- Fleet numbers: Power cars: VT 11 5001–5019 → 601 001–019; Trailers: VM 11 5101–5123 → 901 101–123; VM 11 5201–5208 → 901 201–208; VM 11 5301–5308 → 901 301-908; VM 11 5401–5409 → 901 401–409

Specifications
- Train length: 130,720 mm (428 ft 10 1/2 in)
- Width: 3,012 mm (9 ft 10 5/8 in)
- Wheel diameter: Powered: 950 mm (3 ft 1 3/8 in); Unpowered: 900 mm (2 ft 11 3/8 in)
- Maximum speed: 160 km/h (99 mph)
- Weight: Service: 214 t (211 long tons; 236 short tons)
- Axle load: 18 t (18 long tons; 20 short tons)
- Prime movers: MTU 12V 538 TA 10 or Maybach MD650/aB
- Transmission: hydraulic
- UIC classification: B′2′+2′2′+2′2′+2′2′+2′2′+2′2′+2′B′
- Braking systems: Disc brake, Electromagnetic track brake
- Coupling system: Scharfenberg
- Track gauge: 1,435 mm (4 ft 8 1/2 in)

The trainsets of Class VT 11.5 (often simply called TEE) were diesel multiple units built by Deutsche Bundesbahn (DB) in 1957 and used for Trans Europ Express (TEE) services. Perceived as flagships of the DB rolling stock, they carried first-class seating only. When the UIC numbering scheme became effective on 1 January 1968, the power heads of the trainsets were renamed to Class 601 whilst the middle cars became Class 901 according to the DB locomotive classification. They were used for TEE service from 1957 until 1972 and thereafter on German InterCity services.

== History ==
The VT 11.5 was based on the prewar DRG Class SVT 137 and the innovative designs by Franz Kruckenberg as well as on the experiences with the postwar DB Class VT 10.5. Mostly the trainsets consisted of two motor units built by MAN AG, one dining and kitchen car, one dining and bar car built by Wegmann & Co., and three coaches assembled by Linke-Hofmann-Busch. The weight of a seven-unit trainset was 230 t (230 long tons; 250 short tons), the length was 130 m (426 ft 6 1/8 in). Motor units and coaches were coupled by automatic Scharfenberg couplers, thus allowing trainsets up to ten units and coupling of two trainsets.

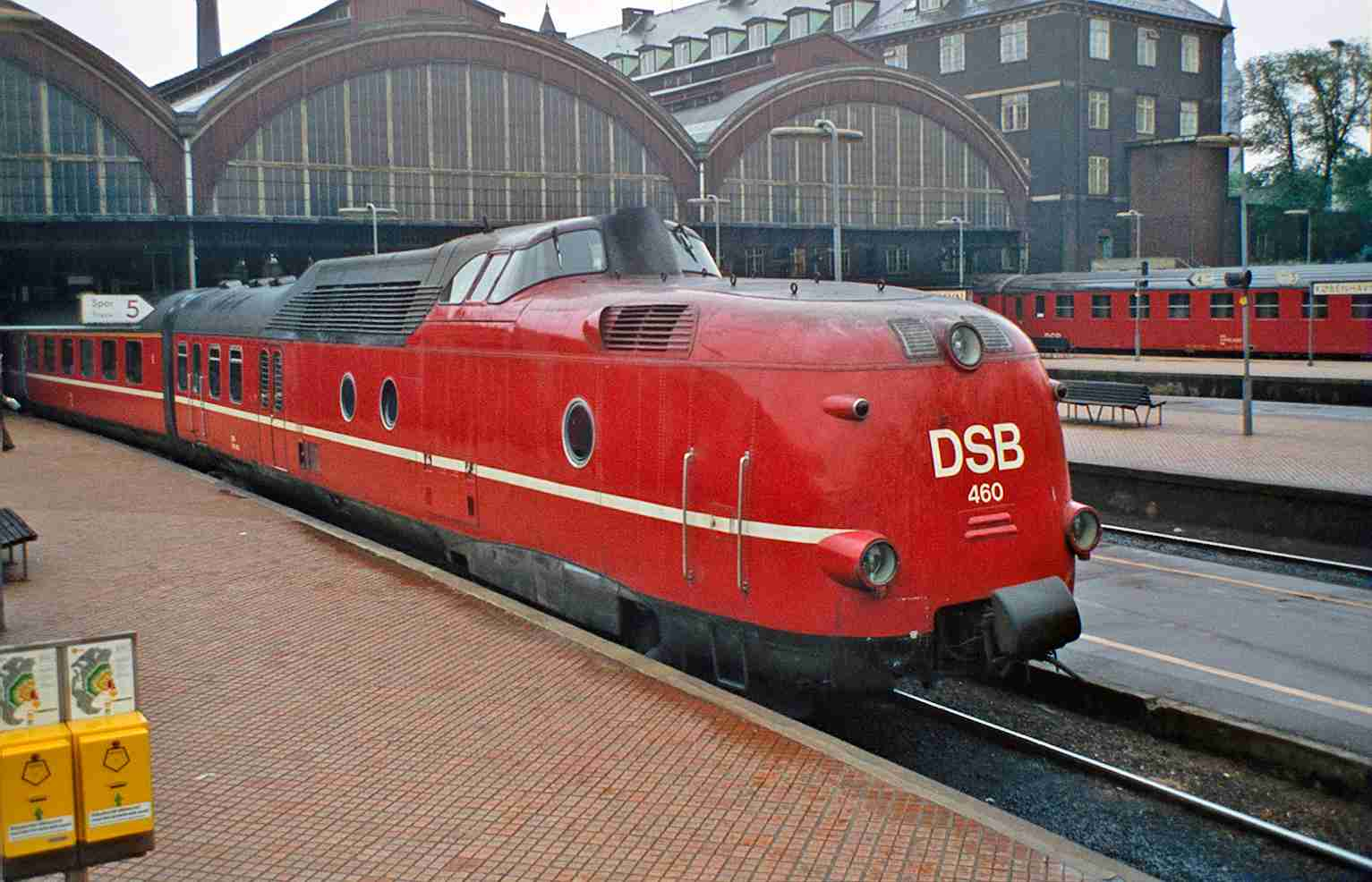
DSB-MA460 in Copenhagen

From 1963 a second series of these trains were sold to the Danish State Railways (DSB) for use as national express trains (lyntog, meaning 'lightning trains'). This was a modified version which could be separated into two independent units and loaded onto the Great Belt ferries, and a total of 5 1/2 whole or 11 half units were sold. It was given the designation "litra MA", ranging from MA 460 to 470. In 1984 the trains were painted in a silvery color, which resulted in the nickname "Sølvpilen" (Silver arrow). Another affectionate nickname was "Flyvende Støvle" (Flying Boot) or "Staniolekspressen" (the Tinfoil express). In 1990 these trains were phased out from Danish service and donated to a Polish railway (first private in Poland - Lubuska Kolej Regionalna Spółka z o.o.). After collapse of that private railway (1994), all these trains were scrapped. One half unit (The MA 460) was not donated to the Polish railway, but given to the Danish Railway Museum, where it still remains operating as a museum train.

== Operational ==
=== Trans Europ Express ===
The first trains were commissioned in 1957 and used on the following international TEE routes:

- TEE 31/32 Rhein-Main Frankfurt/Main – Amsterdam
  2 December 1957 – 27 May 1967
- TEE 74/75 Saphir Dortmund – Oostende
  15 July 1957 – 26 September 1971
- TEE 77/78 Helvetia Hamburg Altona – Zürich
  14 October 1957 – 1 March 1965.
- TEE 168/185 Paris-Ruhr Dortmund – Paris Nord
  23 December 1957 – 29 May 1960 & 30 May 1965 – 31 May 1969

In the 1960s, due to ongoing electrification, routes like the TEE Helvetia were changed to electric locomotive-hauled train sets. The diesel trainsets were reallocated to other TEE routes:

- TEE 155/190 Parsifal Hamburg Altona – Paris Nord
  29 May 1960 – 29 September 1968
- TEE 25/26 Diamant Dortmund – Antwerpen
  30 May 1965 – 29 September 1971
- TEE 84/85 Mediolanum München – Milan
  1 June 1969 – 28 September 1972

=== Intercity ===
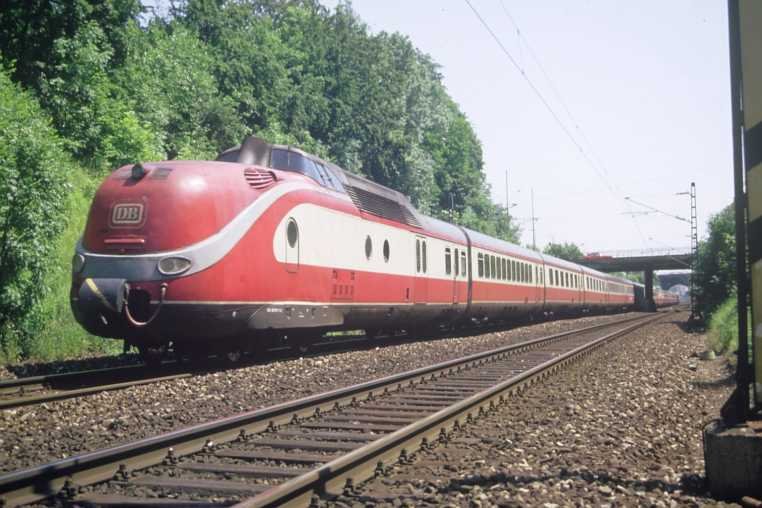
Class 601 in DB-Touristik livery 1986, München südring

In 1971, DB started their new first-class-only InterCity system, using mainly the 601 series on the non-electrified InterCity routes. The regular maximum speed was set to 160 km/h for seven-unit trains. For trains up to 10 units the 602 was used. In 1979, the InterCity system was expanded and second-class compartments were introduced for these trains, meaning the end of 601/602 use for these trains.

=== Tourism ===
From 1980, the 601/901 was used for special tourist services. These trains had ten units including refitted open seating cars; sometimes two trainsets were coupled to form a 20-unit train. This "Alpen-See-Express" ran scheduled from Hamburg and Dortmund to southern German and Austrian destinations, including Berchtesgaden, Lindau, Oberstdorf, Innsbruck, Zell am See, and Salzburg. This service ended in 1988, when all 601s except the two scrapped (601 002 and 901 403) were sold to Italy.

=== Deutsche Reichsbahn ===
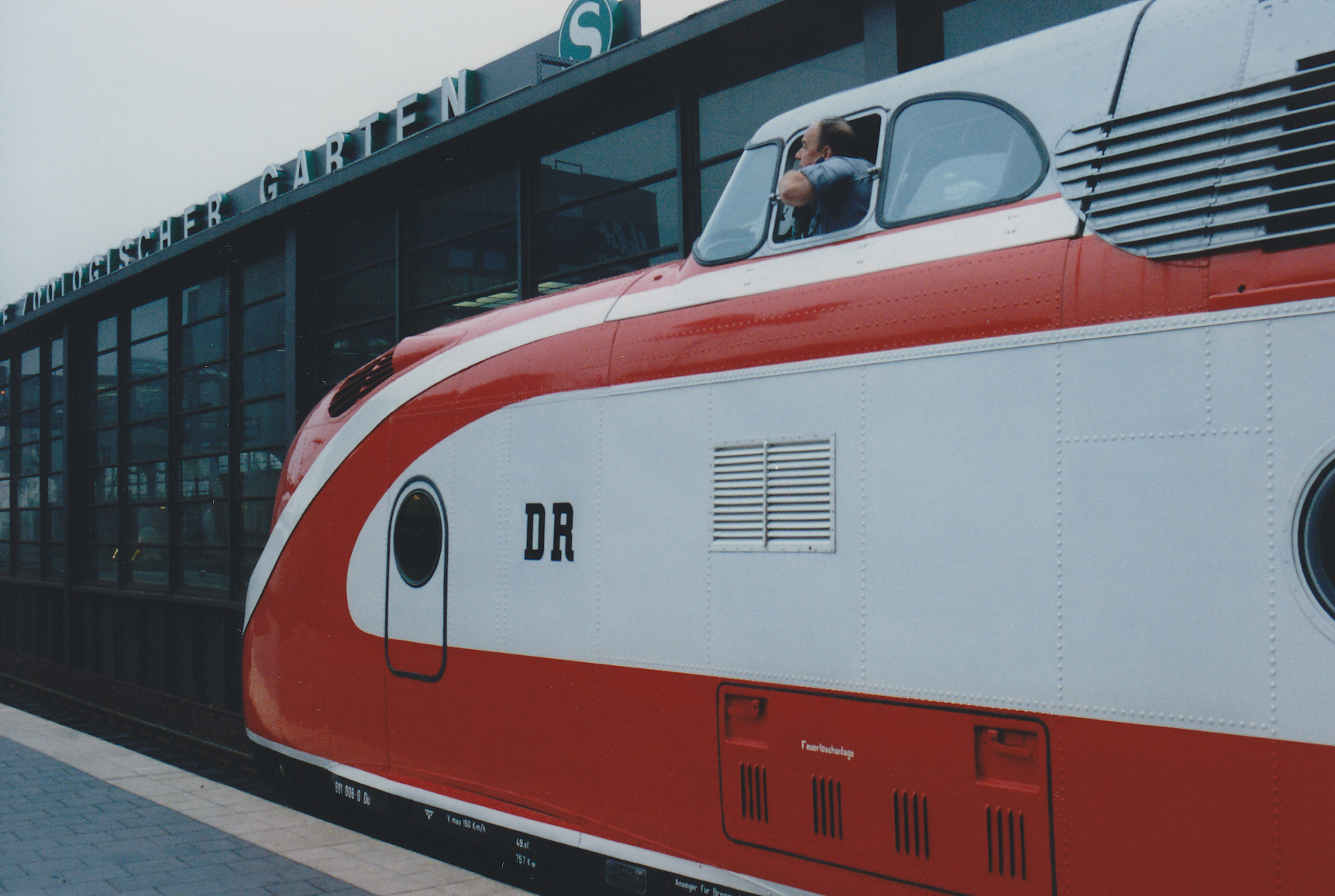
Class 601 with DR Logo, Berlin Zoologischer Garten

The fall of the Berlin Wall in 1989 led to a new life for the 601 as an InterCity train. One of the 10-unit trains was loaned from Italy to the East German Reichsbahn (DR) and served from July 27, 1990, to September 29, 1990, as InterCity Max Liebermann on the route Hamburg–Berlin. One part of this train had been later repainted blue-beige and is still to be seen at the Augsburg Railway Park museum. It today houses a restaurant run by celebrity chef Alfons Schuhbeck.

== Technical details ==
=== Class 601 ===
The VT 11.5, later 601 had two motor units at the head and the tail of the train. Each one had an 809 kW diesel from MTU and a hydraulic transmission from Voith or Maybach. The maximum speed was 140 km/h (87 mph), later 160 km/h (99 mph). All coaches were air-conditioned.

=== Class 602 ===
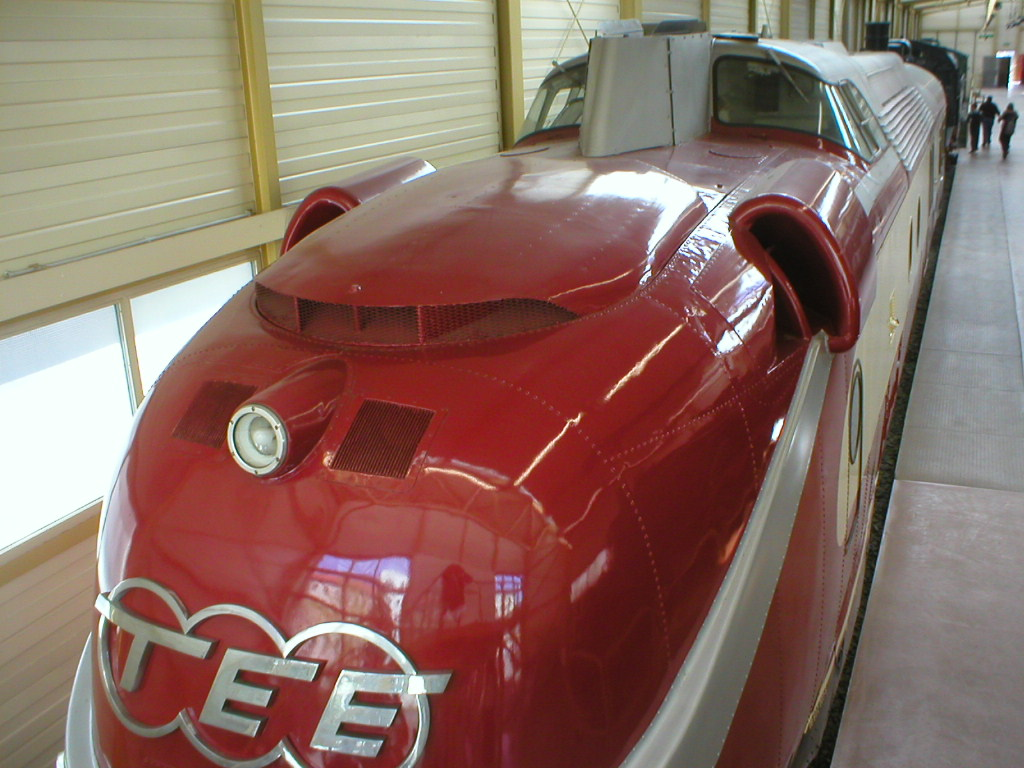
Class 602 at the DB Museum, in Nuremberg.

In order to run ten-unit trains with a maximum speed of 160 km/h, four VT 11.5 were rebuilt in 1970 and received 2,200-horsepower (1,600 kW) AVCO Lycoming TF55 gas turbines supplied under license by Klöckner-Humboldt-Deutz in place of their original 1,100-horsepower (820 kW) Diesel engines. They were renumbered as Class 602 001–004 (ex-Class 601 nos. 012, 003, 007 and 010, respectively), recognizable at the large dimensioned air intakes, and used for DB InterCity service, starting with the train connection between Hamburg and Ludwigshafen in July 1974.

From 1975, a mixed operation with diesel and gas turbine power heads was made possible. During test runs in April 1975, a train with two 602 and two coaches ran 217 km/h on the Hanover–Hamburg railway line, a new German record for trains powered by combustion engines (equalled only in 2000 by an ICE TD train). Since the turbines caused some problems and had higher fuel consumption, the 602, like the DB Class 210, were taken out of service by 1979.

== Preservation ==
One trainset has been preserved in operating condition by DB, consisting of power cars VT 11.5 5014/19 and eight unpowered cars, and it operates occasionally on special excursions, including for private hire. The only other car preserved from this series is VT 11.5 5012 (as 602 003, its later number), preserved at the Nuremberg Transport Museum.

== See also ==
- List of Deutsche Bundesbahn locomotives and railbuses

== Works cited ==
- Hajt, Jörg (2001). Das grosse TEE Buch (in German). Bonn/Königswinter: Heel Verlag. ISBN 3-89365-948-X.
- Berndt, Torsten (2002). Reisen 1. Klasse VT 11.5 (in German). Irsee: Märklin.
- Mertens, Maurice; Malaspina, Jean-Pierre (2007). La Légende des Trans Europ Express (in French). Vannes: LR Presse. ISBN 978-29-036514-5-9.
- Goette, Peter (2008). TEE-Züge in Deutschland (in German). Freiburg: EK-Verlag. ISBN 978-3-88255-698-8.
