= Passenger train =

Train used to carry people

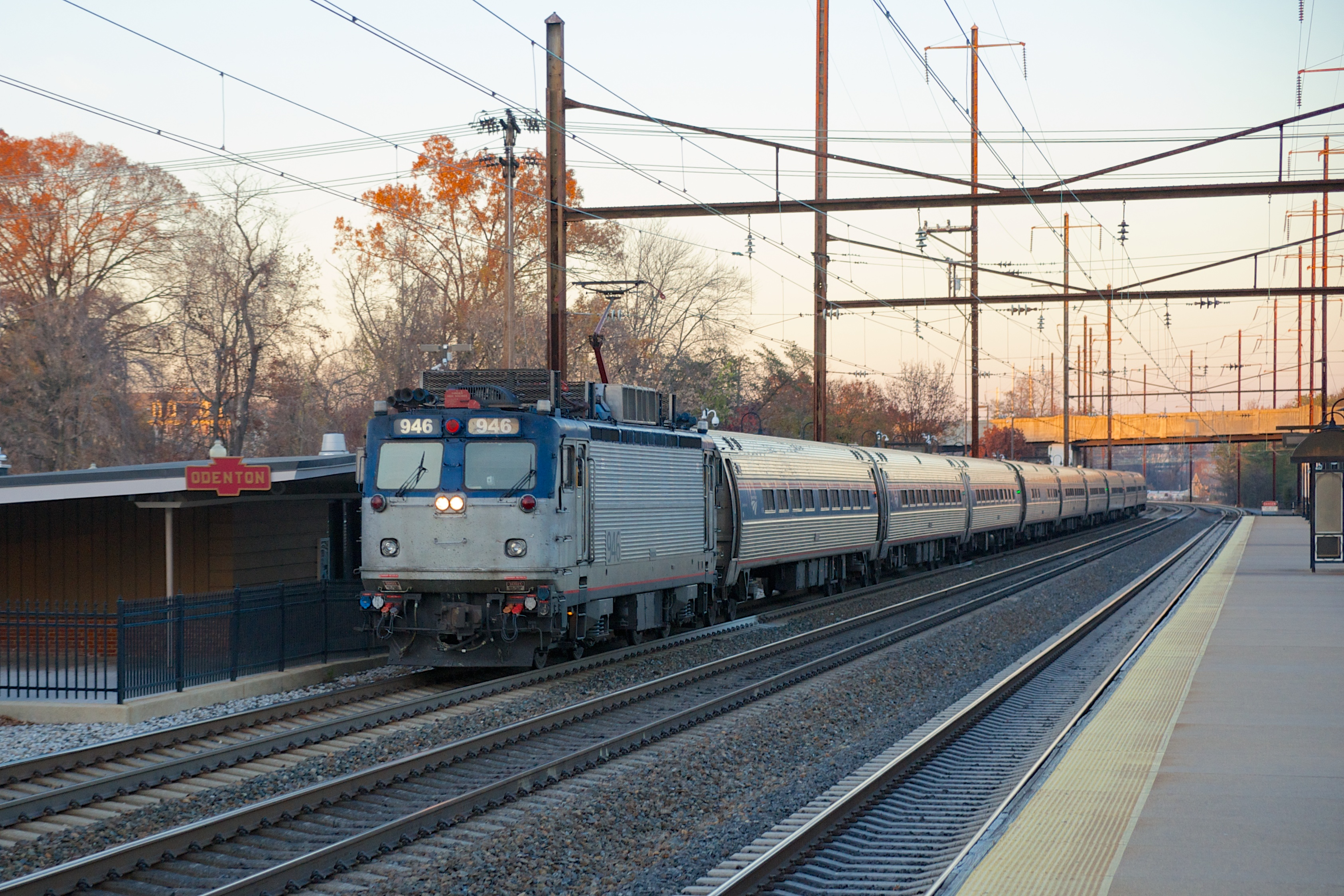
Amtrak's electric locomotive-hauled Northeast Regional intercity train in the United States

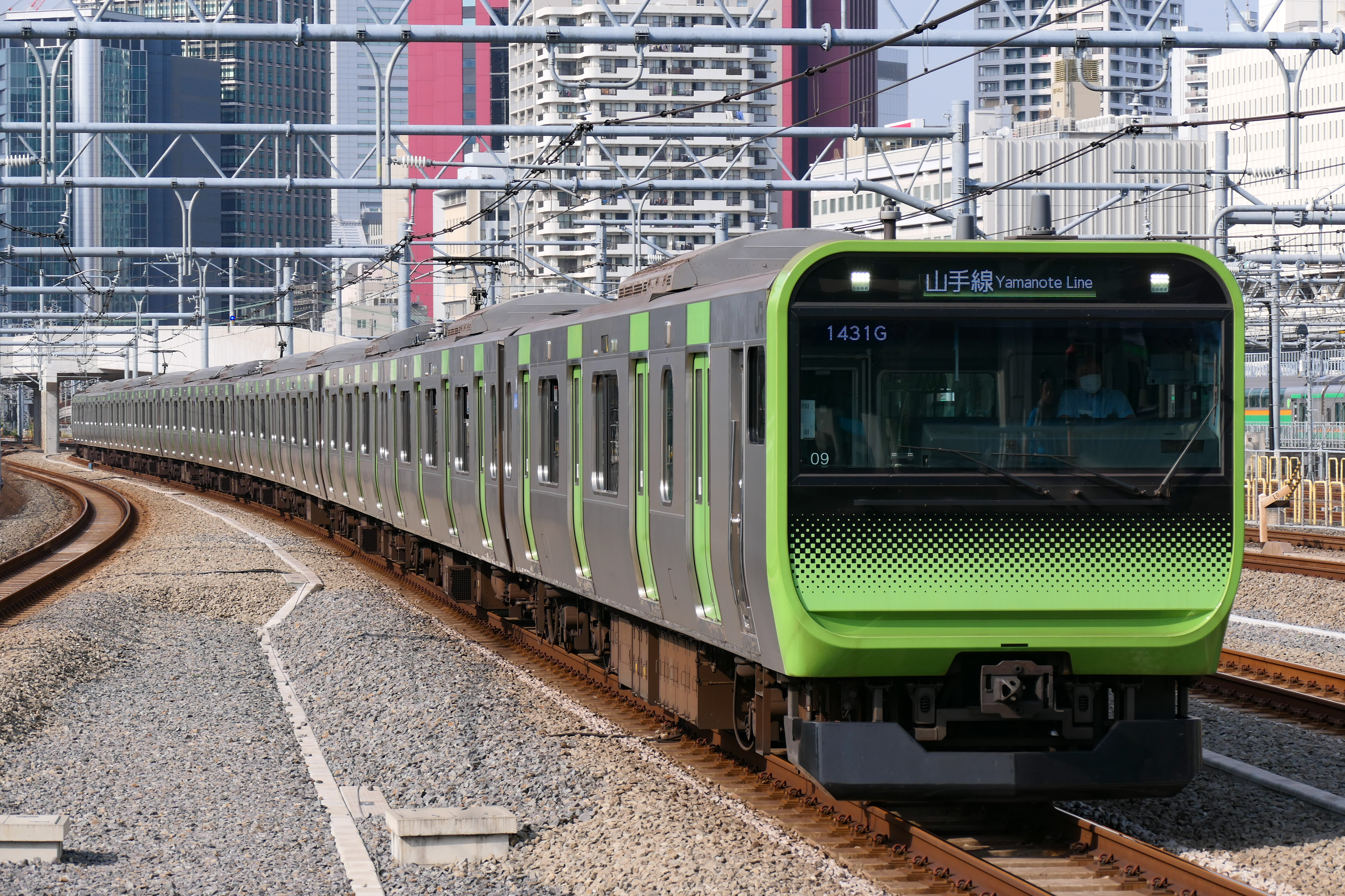
One of JR East's commuter electric multiple units in Japan

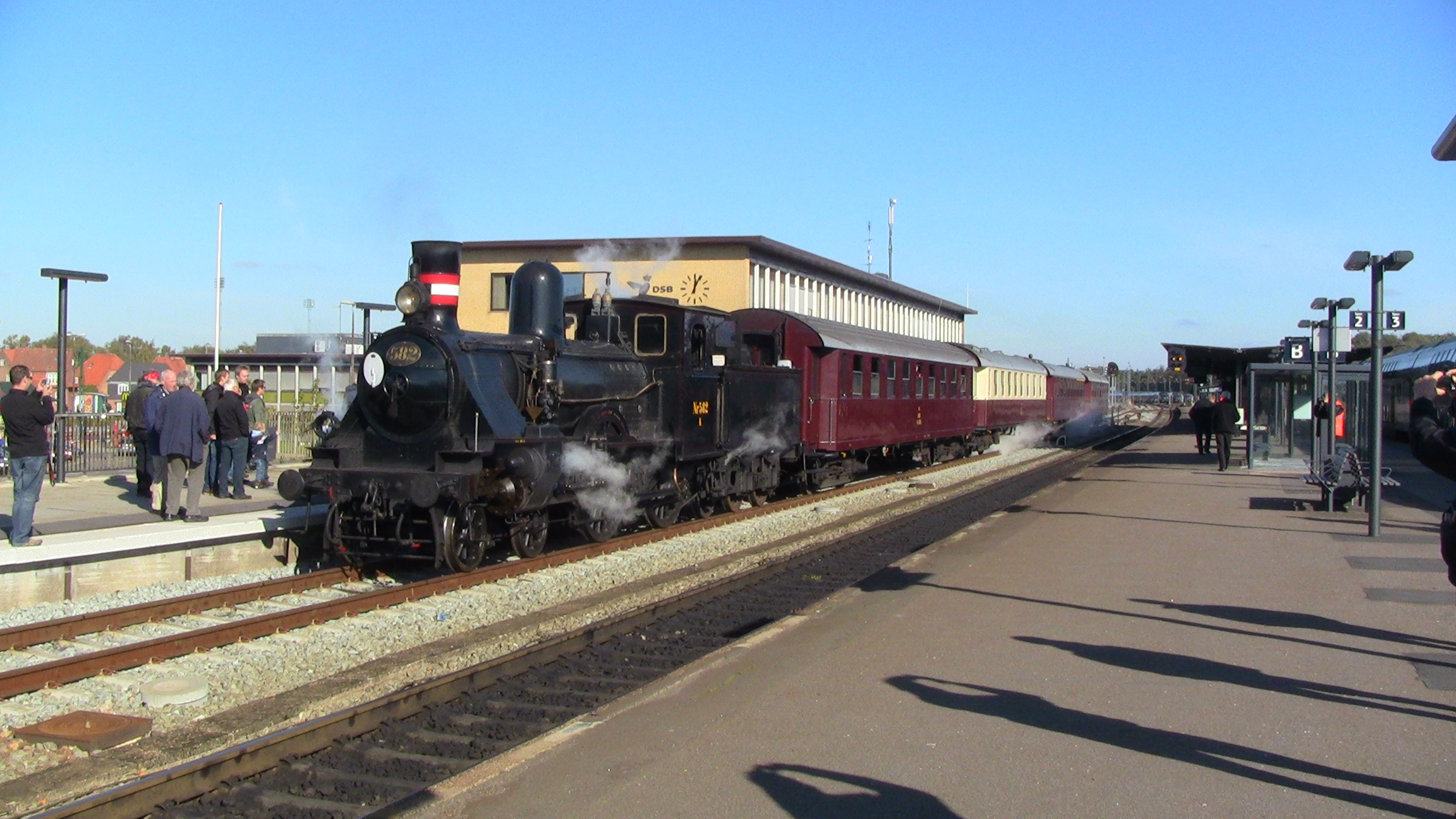
A heritage train in Denmark

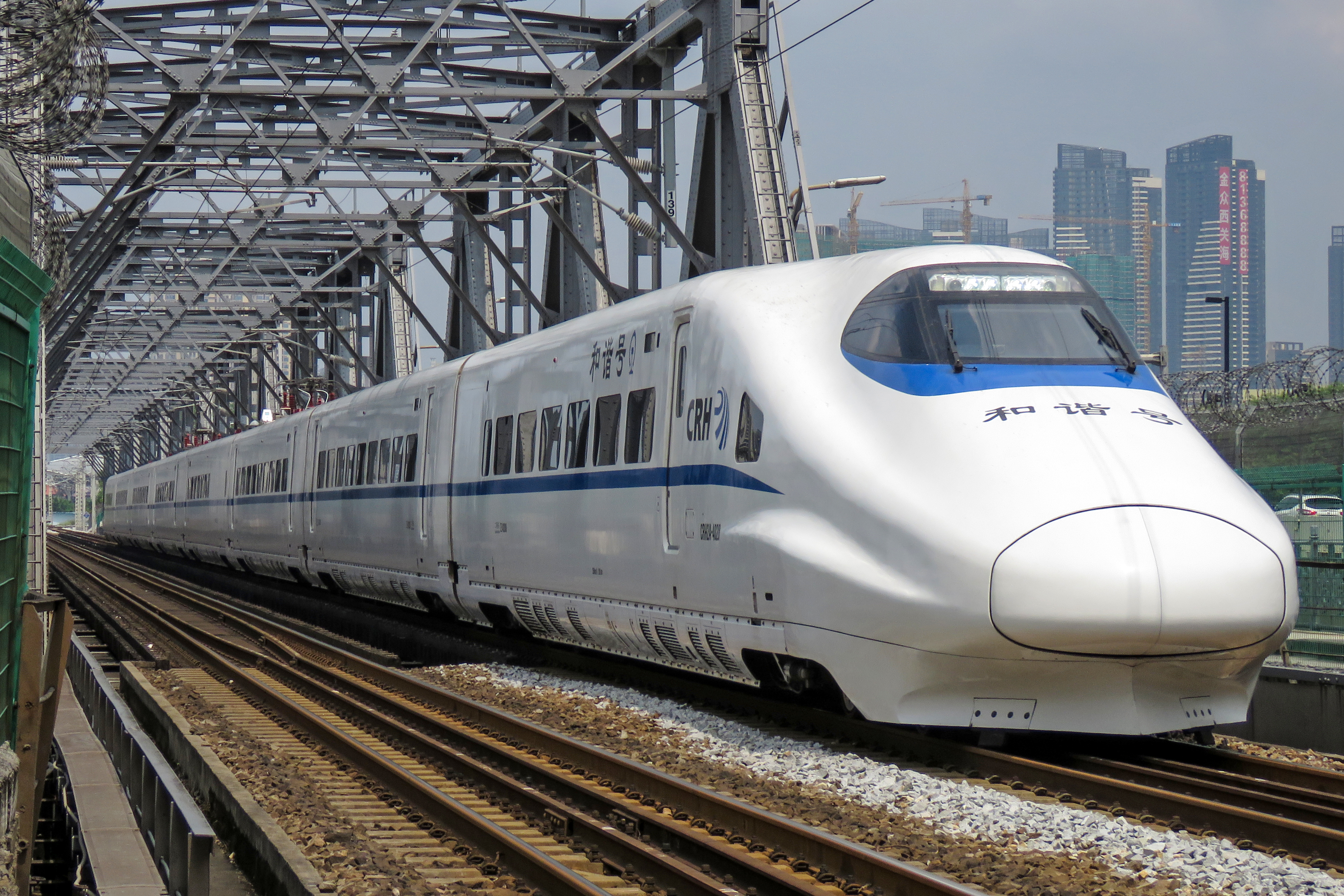
A high speed passenger train in China

A passenger train is a train used to transport people along a railroad line, as opposed to a freight train that carries goods. These trains may consist of unpowered passenger railroad cars (also known as coaches or carriages) hauled by one or more locomotives, or may be self-propelled; self propelled passenger trains are known as multiple units or railcars. Passenger trains stop at stations or depots, where passengers may board and disembark. In most cases, passenger trains operate on a fixed schedule and have priority over freight trains.

Car design and the overall safety of passenger trains have dramatically evolved, making rail travel remarkably safe. Some passenger trains, both long-distance and short-distance, use bi-level (double-decker) cars to carry more passengers per train. Sleeper trains include sleeping cars with beds. Passenger trains hauled by locomotives are more expensive to operate than multiple units, but have a higher passenger capacity comparatively.

Many prestigious passenger train services have been bestowed a special name, some of which have become famous in literature and fiction.

== History ==
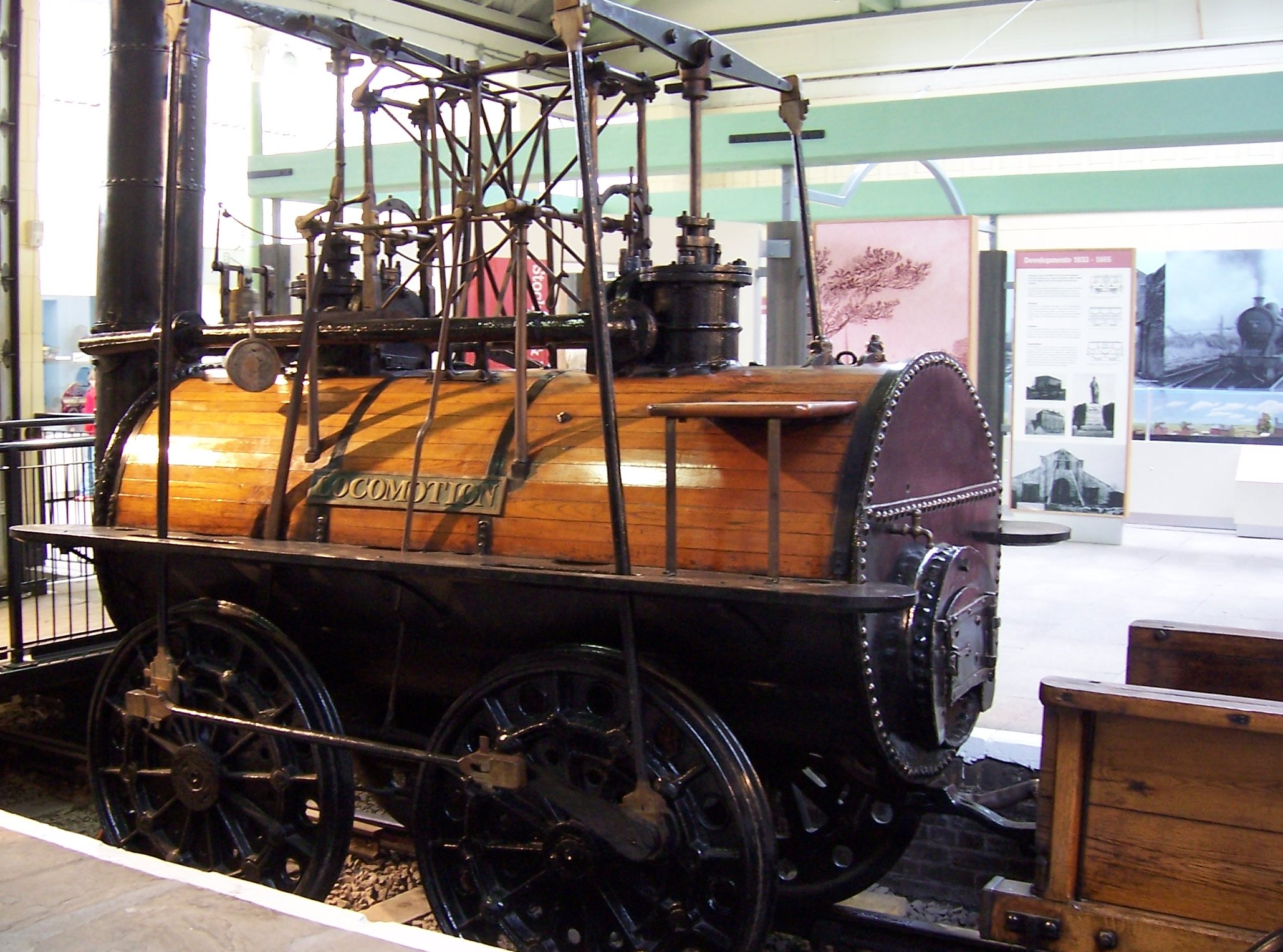
Locomotion No. 1, the first locomotive to carry passengers on a public railway

The first occasion on which a railway locomotive pulled a train carrying passengers was in the United Kingdom in 1804, at Penydarren Ironworks in Wales, when 70 employees of the ironworks were transported 9 miles by an engine designed by Richard Trevithick. The first passenger train in regular service was a horse drawn train on the Swansea and Mumbles Railway which opened in 1807. In 1808, Trevithick ran a passenger-carrying exhibition train called Catch Me Who Can on a small loop of track in London. The exhibition, which ran for two weeks, charged passengers for rides.

The first steam train carrying passengers on a public railway was hauled by Locomotion No. 1 on the Stockton and Darlington Railway in 1825, traveling at speeds up to 15 miles per hour.

Travel by passenger trains in the United States began in the 1830s and became popular in the 1850s and '60s.

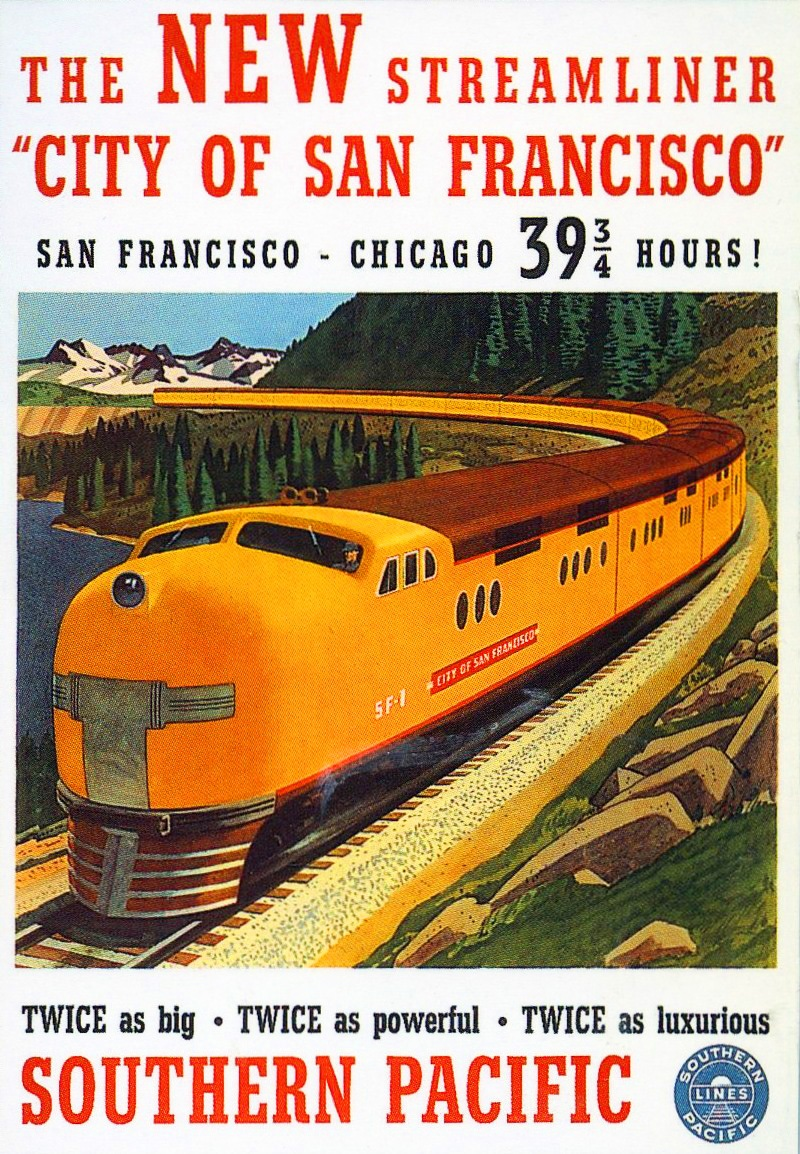
Streamliner trains, such as the City of San Francisco, were developed beginning in the 1930s to reinvigorate passenger train services.

The first electric passenger train was exhibited at the Berlin Industrial Exposition 1879. The first successful commercial electric passenger train, the Gross-Lichterfelde Tramway, ran a year later in Lichterfelde.

== Long-distance trains ==
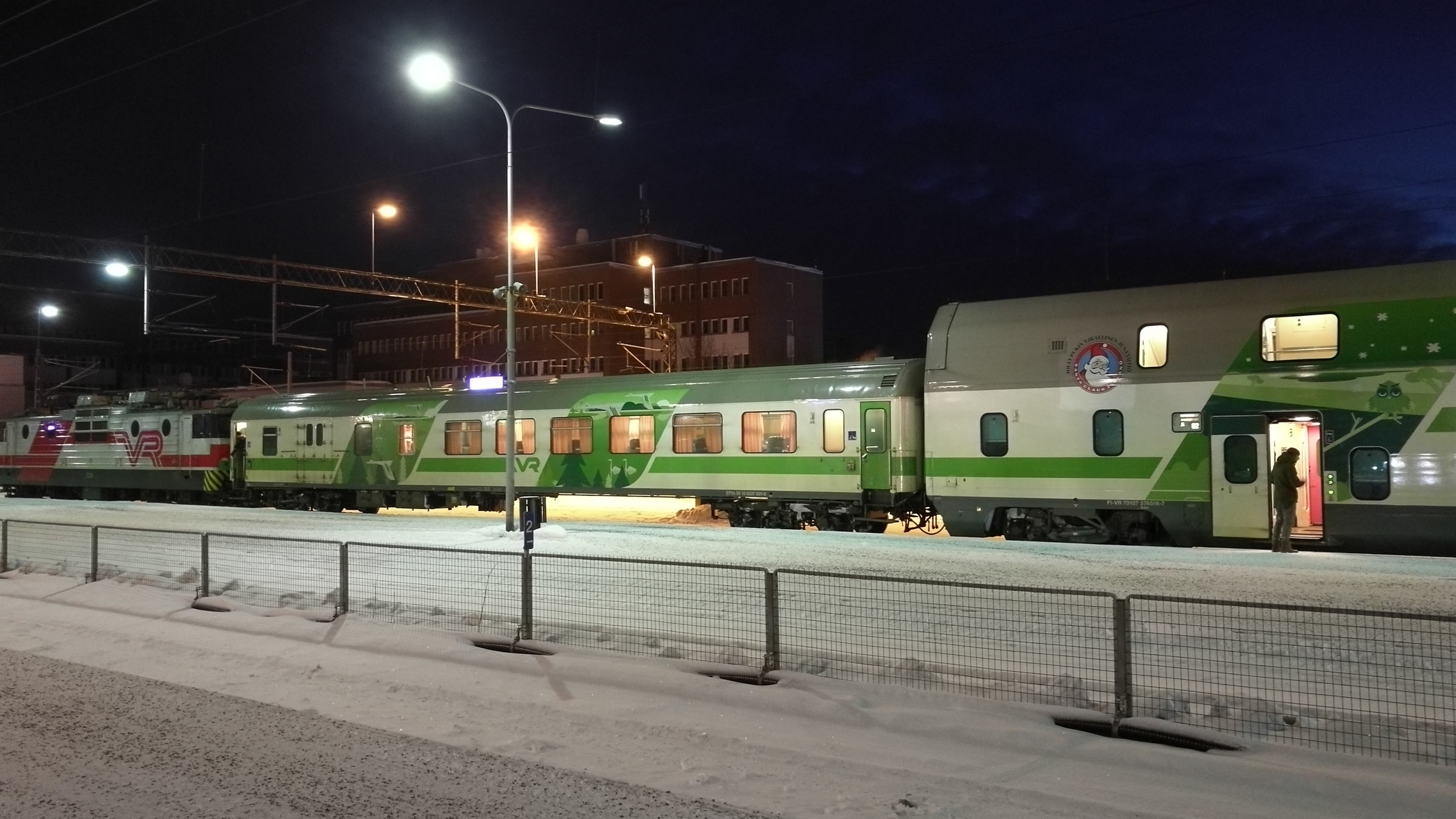
A long-distance night train at the Oulu railway station in Oulu, Finland

Long-distance trains travel between many cities or regions of a country, and sometimes cross several countries. They often have a dining car or restaurant car, allowing passengers to have a meal during their journey. Trains traveling overnight may also have sleeping cars. Currently, in many countries, much of the travel over 500 miles (800 km) or more is by air, but in others, long-distance travel by rail is popular or the only affordable option.

=== High-speed rail ===
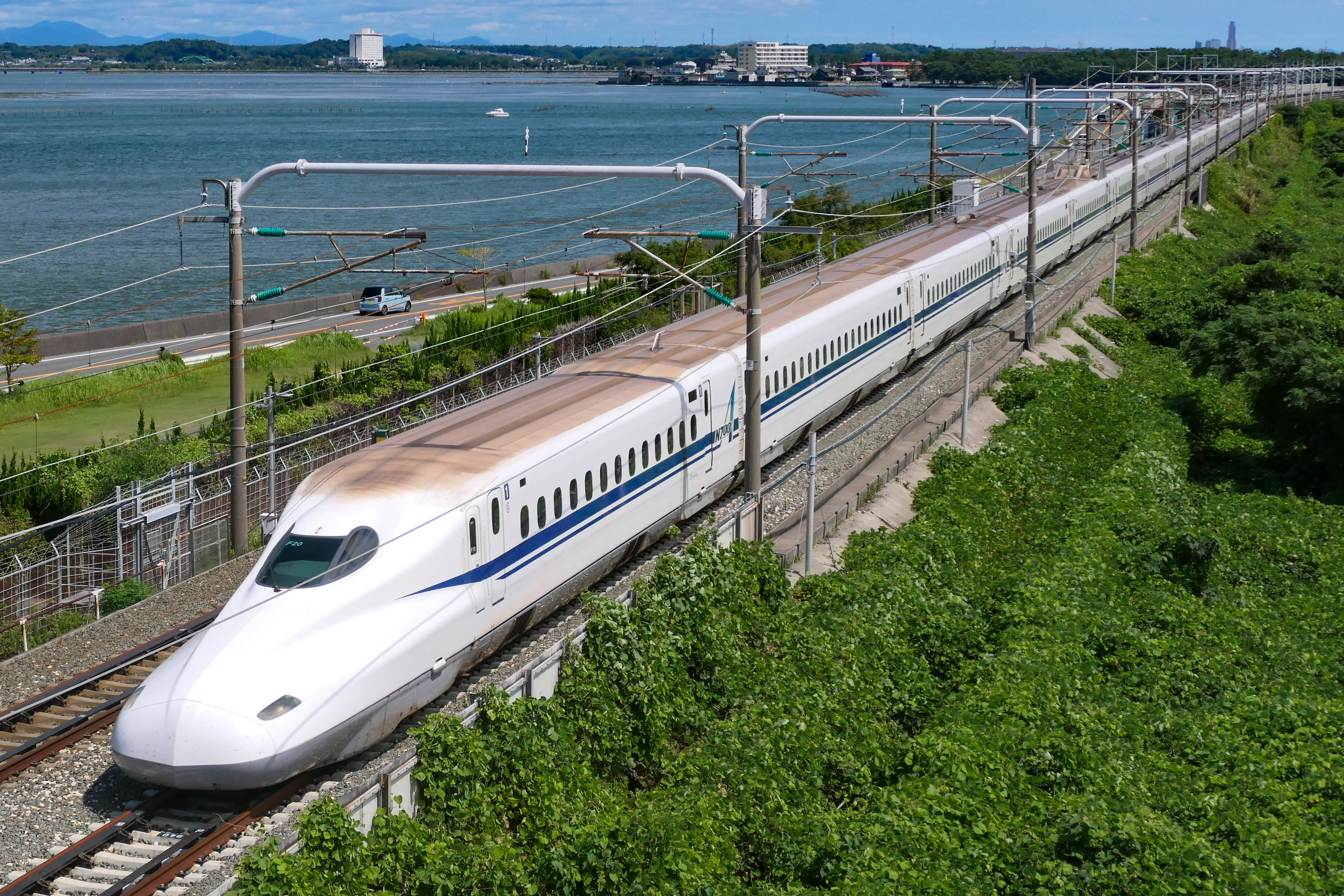
The Shinkansen N700 Series Nozomi travels between Tokyo and Osaka in around two and a half hours.

One notable and growing long-distance train category is high-speed rail, which generally runs at speeds above 200 km/h (120 mph) and often operates on dedicated tracks that are surveyed and prepared to accommodate high speeds. The first successful example of a high-speed passenger rail system was Japan's Shinkansen, colloquially known as the "bullet train", which commenced operation in October 1964. Other examples include Italy's Le Frecce, France's TGV (Train à Grande Vitesse, lit. 'high speed train'), Germany's ICE (Inter-City Express), and Spain's AVE (Alta Velocidad Española) in Europe.

In most cases, high-speed rail travel is time- and cost-competitive with air travel when distances do not exceed 500 to 600 km (310 to 370 mi), as airport check-in and boarding procedures can add at least two hours to the overall transit time. Also, rail operating costs over these distances may be lower when the amount of jet fuel consumed by an airliner during takeoff and climbout is taken into consideration. Air travel becomes more cost-competitive as distance increases because fuel accounts for a smaller share of an airline's overall operating costs.

Some high-speed rail systems employ tilting technology to improve stability in curves. Examples of tilting trains are the Advanced Passenger Train (APT), the Pendolino, the N700 Series Shinkansen, Amtrak's Acela and the Spanish Talgo. Tilting is a dynamic form of superelevation, allowing both low- and high-speed traffic to use the same trackage (though not simultaneously) and producing a more comfortable ride for passengers.

=== Inter-city trains ===
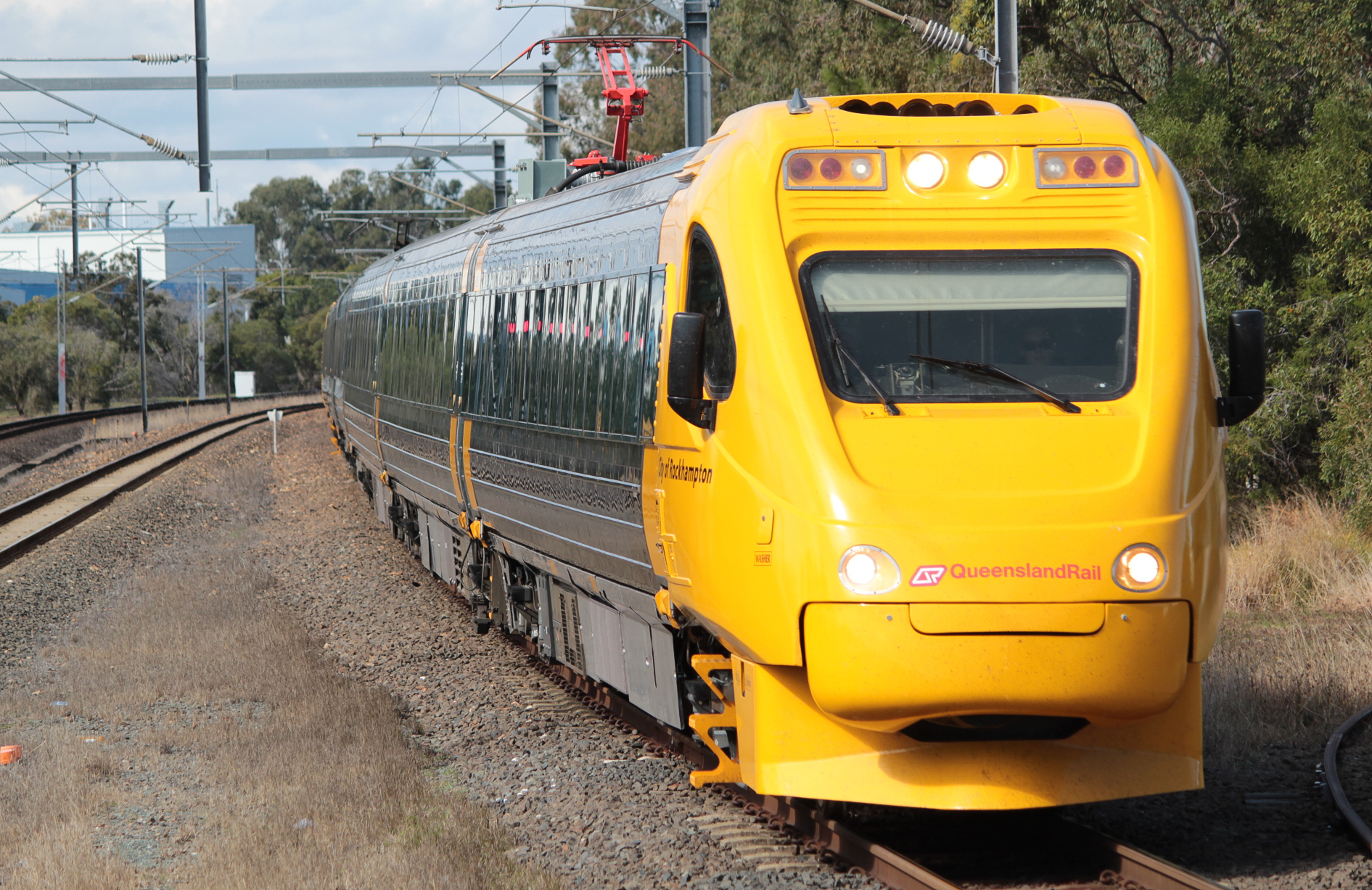
The Electric Tilt Train, the fastest train in Australia, operates between Brisbane and Rockhampton in Queensland, a distance of 615 km.

"Inter-city" is a general term for any rail service that uses trains with limited stops to provide fast, long-distance travel. Inter-city services can be divided into three major groups:

- InterCity: using high-speed trains to connect cities in Europe, bypassing all intermediate stations, thus linking major population hubs in the fastest time possible
- Express: calling at some intermediate stations between cities, serving larger urban communities
- Regional: calling at all intermediate stations between cities, serving smaller communities along the route

The distinction between the three types of inter-city rail service may be unclear; trains can run as InterCity services between major cities, then revert to an express (or even regional) train service to reach communities at the furthest points of the journey. This practice allows less populous communities to be served most cost-effectively, at the expense of longer journey times for those wishing to travel to the terminus.

=== Higher-speed rail ===
Higher-speed rail services operate faster than conventional inter-city trains but slower than high-speed rail services. These services are provided after improvements to the conventional rail infrastructure that support trains operating safely at higher speeds.

== Short-distance trains ==
=== Commuter trains ===
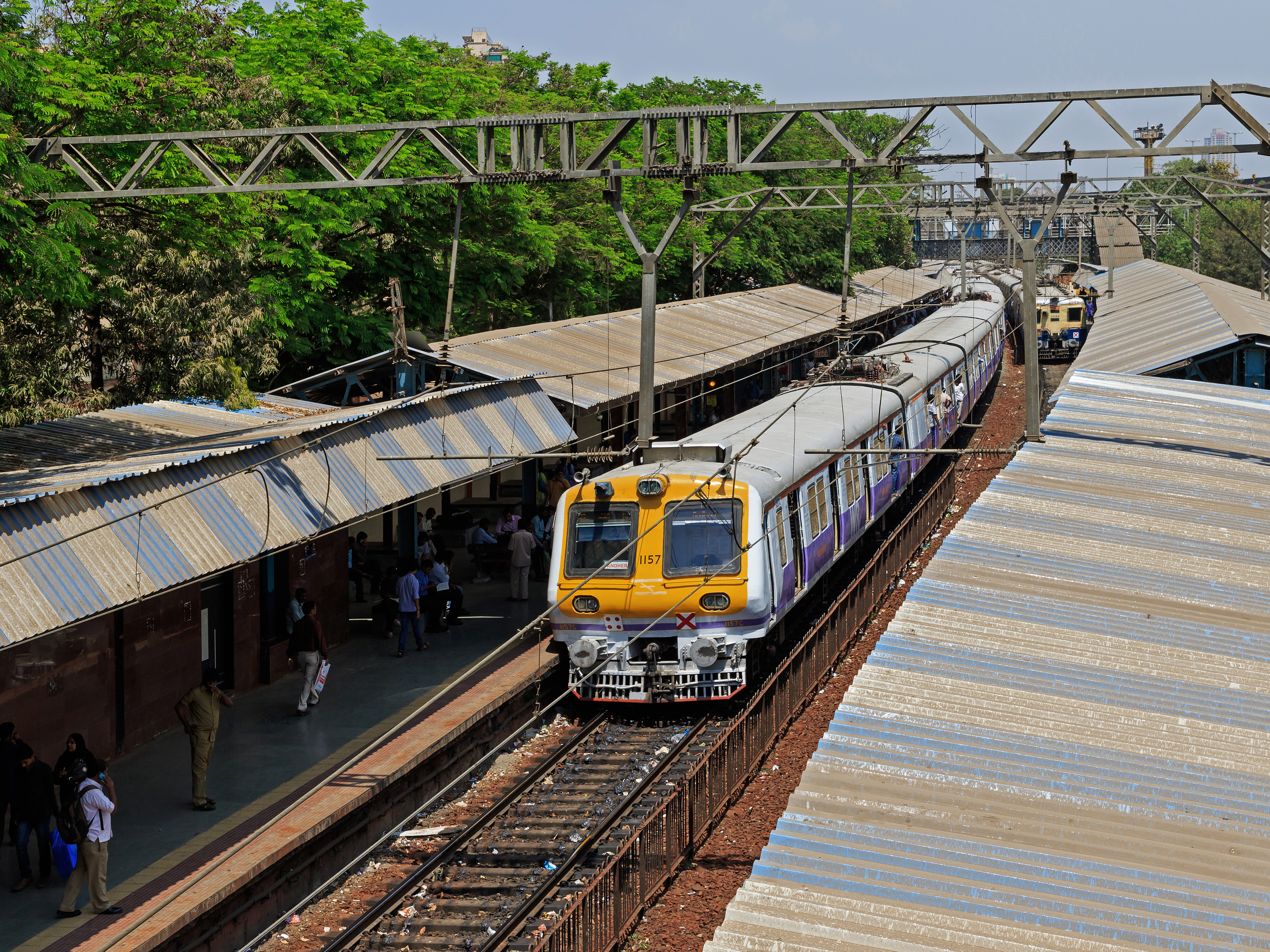
Mumbai's suburban trains handle 7.24 million commuters daily.

Many cities and their surrounding areas are served by commuter trains (also known as suburban trains, or S-Bahn in the German-speaking world), which serve commuters who live outside of the city they work in, or vice versa. More specifically, in the United States commuter rail service is defined as, "short-haul rail passenger transportation in metropolitan and suburban areas usually having reduced fare, multiple ride, and commuter tickets and morning and evening peak period operations". Trains are very efficient for transporting large numbers of people at once, compared to road transport. While automobiles may be delayed by traffic congestion, trains operate on dedicated rights-of-way, which allow them to bypass such congestion.

With the use of bilevel cars, which are tall enough to have two levels of seating, commuter rail services can haul as many as 150 commuters per train car, and over 1,000 per train: much more than the capacity of automobiles and buses.

=== Railcar ===
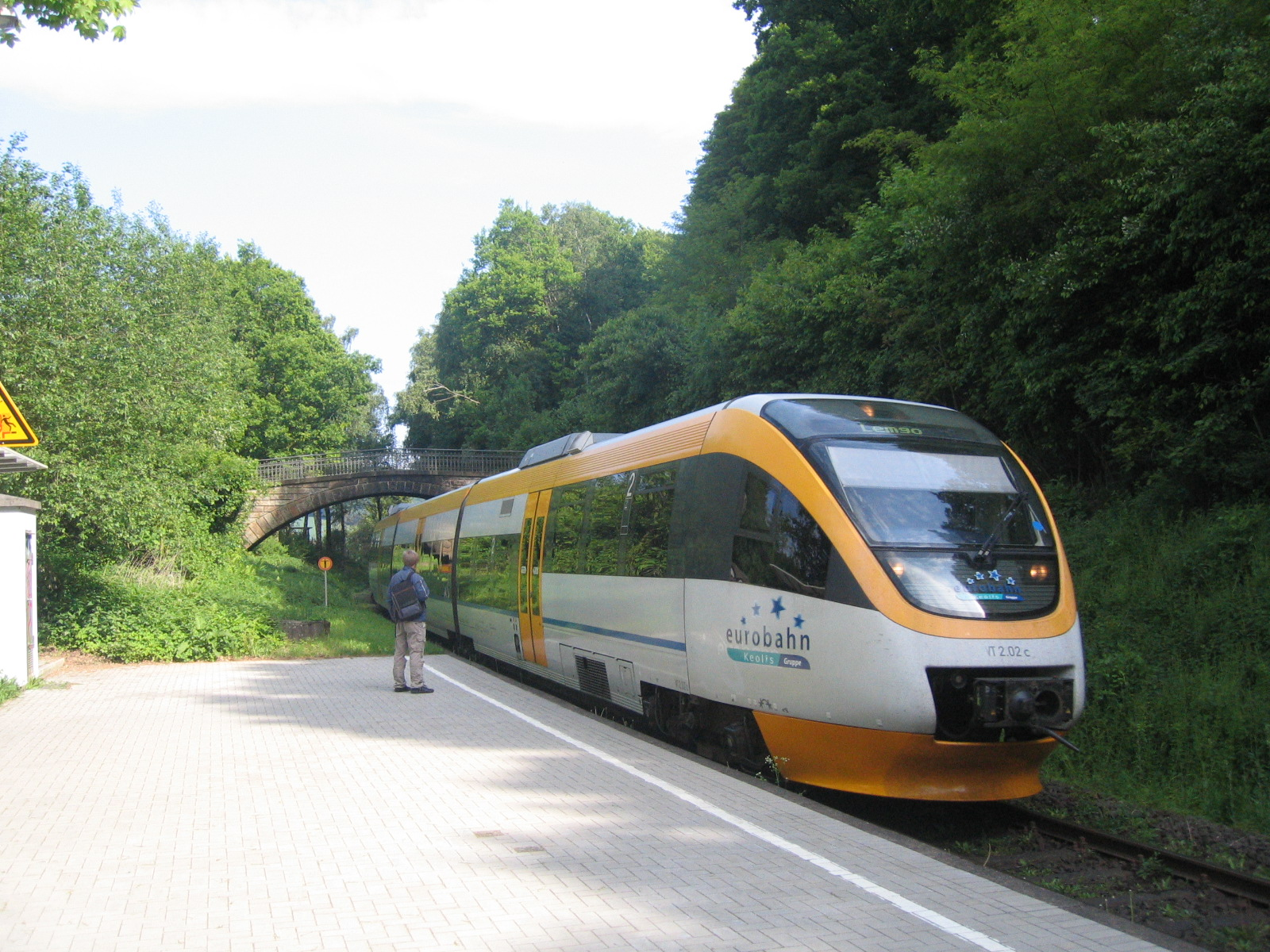
The Bombardier Talent articulated regional railcar

In British and Australian usage, a "railcar" is a self-propelled railway vehicle designed to transport passengers. The term is usually used in reference to a train consisting of a single passenger car (carriage, coach) with a driver's cab at one or both ends. Some railways, e.g. the Great Western Railway, used the term "railmotor". If the railcar can pull a full train, it is more likely to be called a "motor coach" or a "motor car". The term "railcar" is sometimes also used as an alternative name for the small types of multiple unit that consist of more than one coach.

=== Rapid transit ===
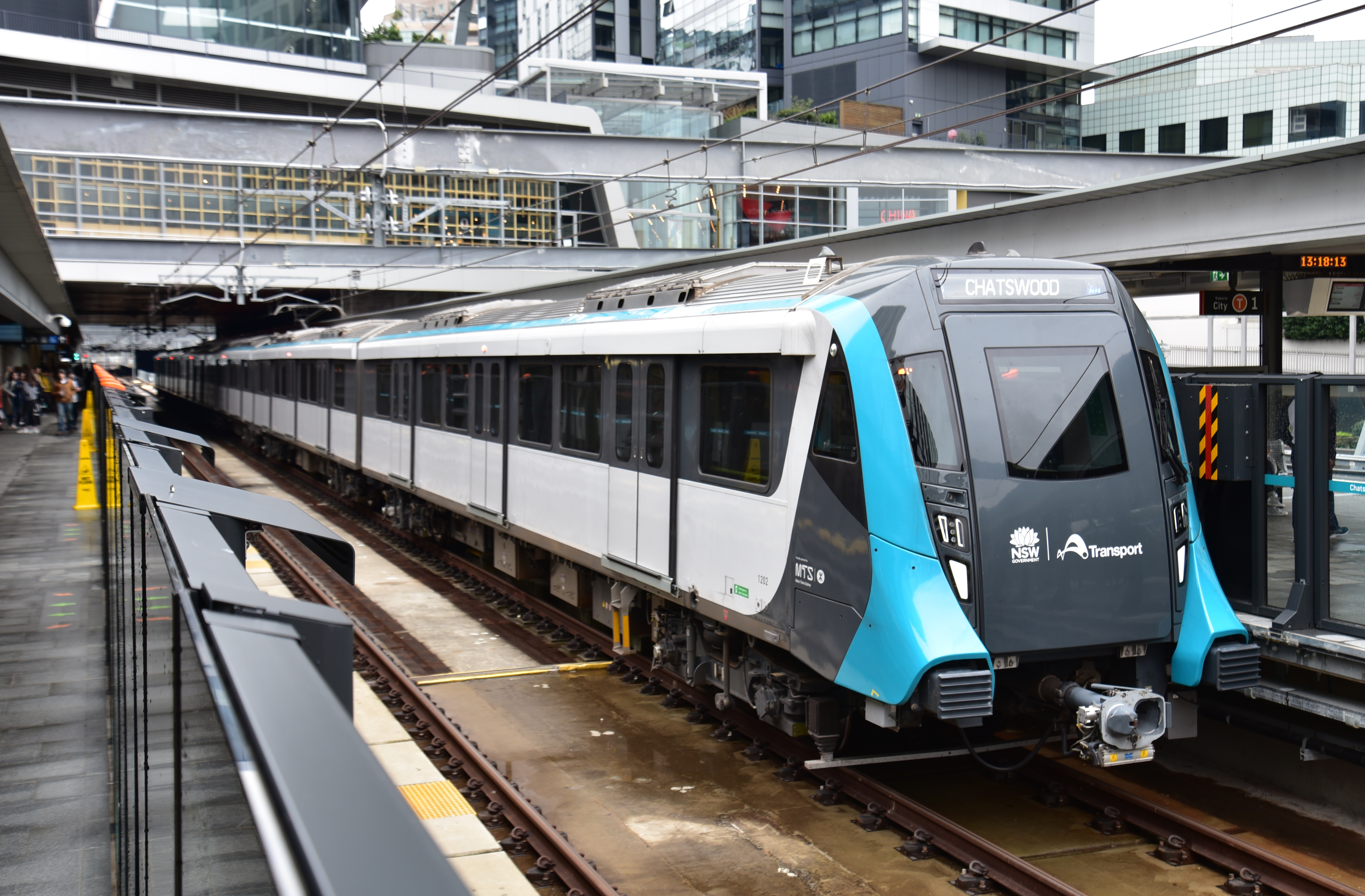
Sydney Metro Alstom Metropolis in Chatswood, New South Wales, Australia

Rapid transit trains are trains that operate in urban areas on exclusive rights-of-way in that pedestrians and road vehicles may not access them. In Europe, rapid transit is widely known as a metro.

=== Light rail ===
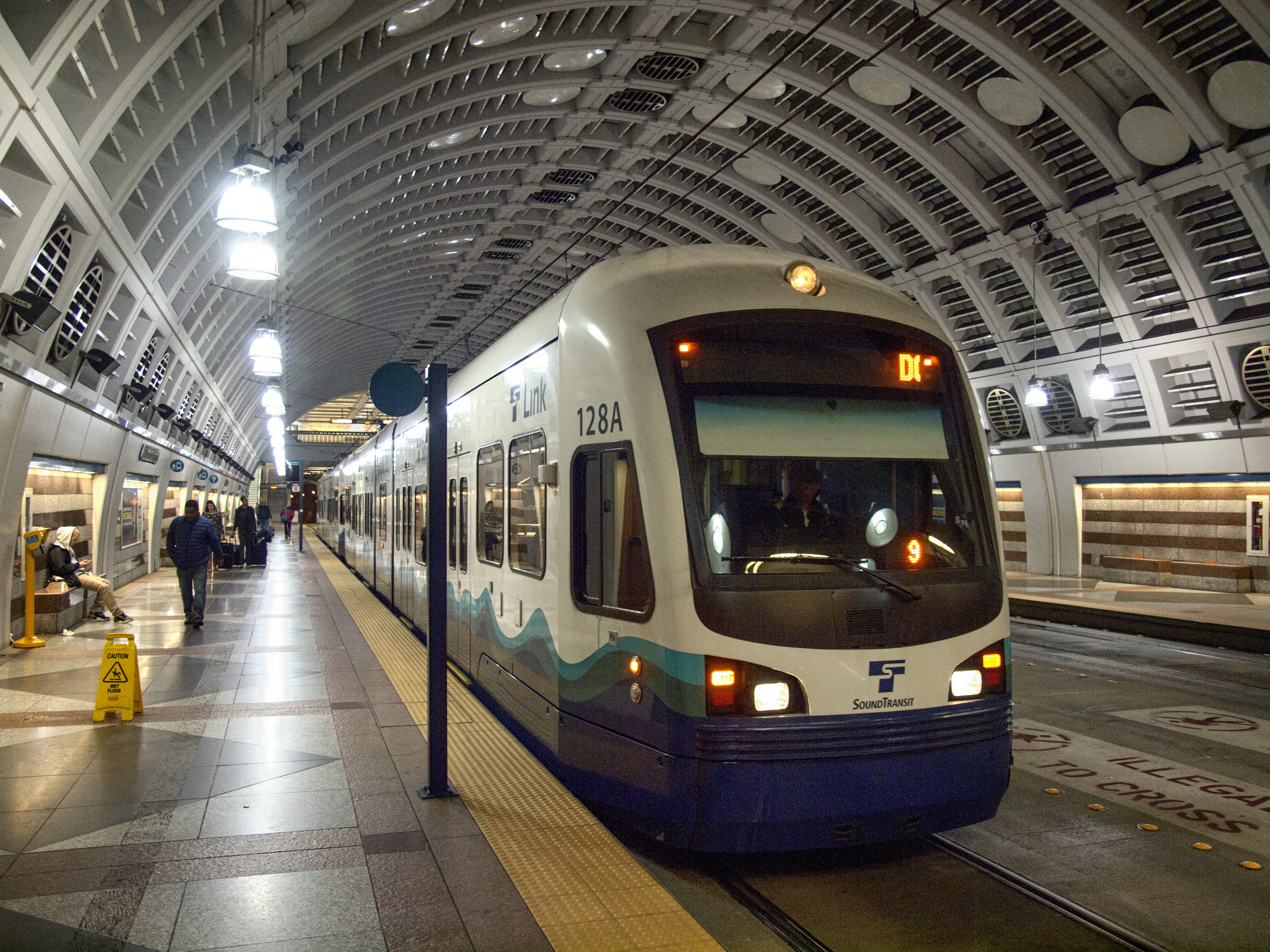
Link light rail in Seattle

Light rails are electrically powered urban passenger trains that run along an exclusive rights-of-way at ground level, raised structures, tunnels, or in streets. Light rail systems generally use lighter equipment that operates at slower speeds to allow for more flexibility in integrating systems into urban environments.

=== Tram ===
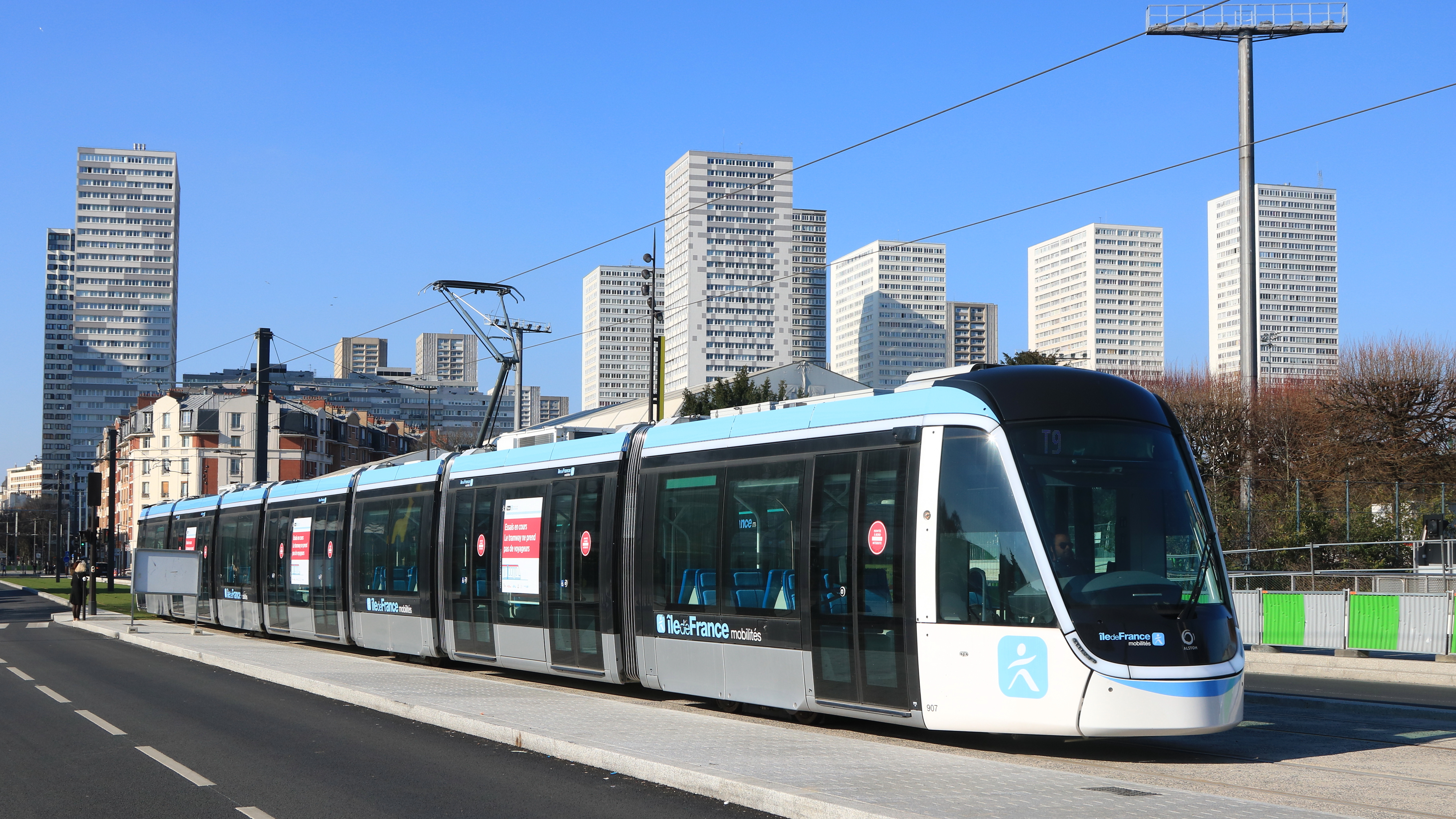
A tram in Paris, France

Trams (also known as streetcars in North America) are a type of passenger train that runs a tramway track on or alongside public urban streets, often including segments of right-of-way for passengers and vehicles.

== Heritage trains ==
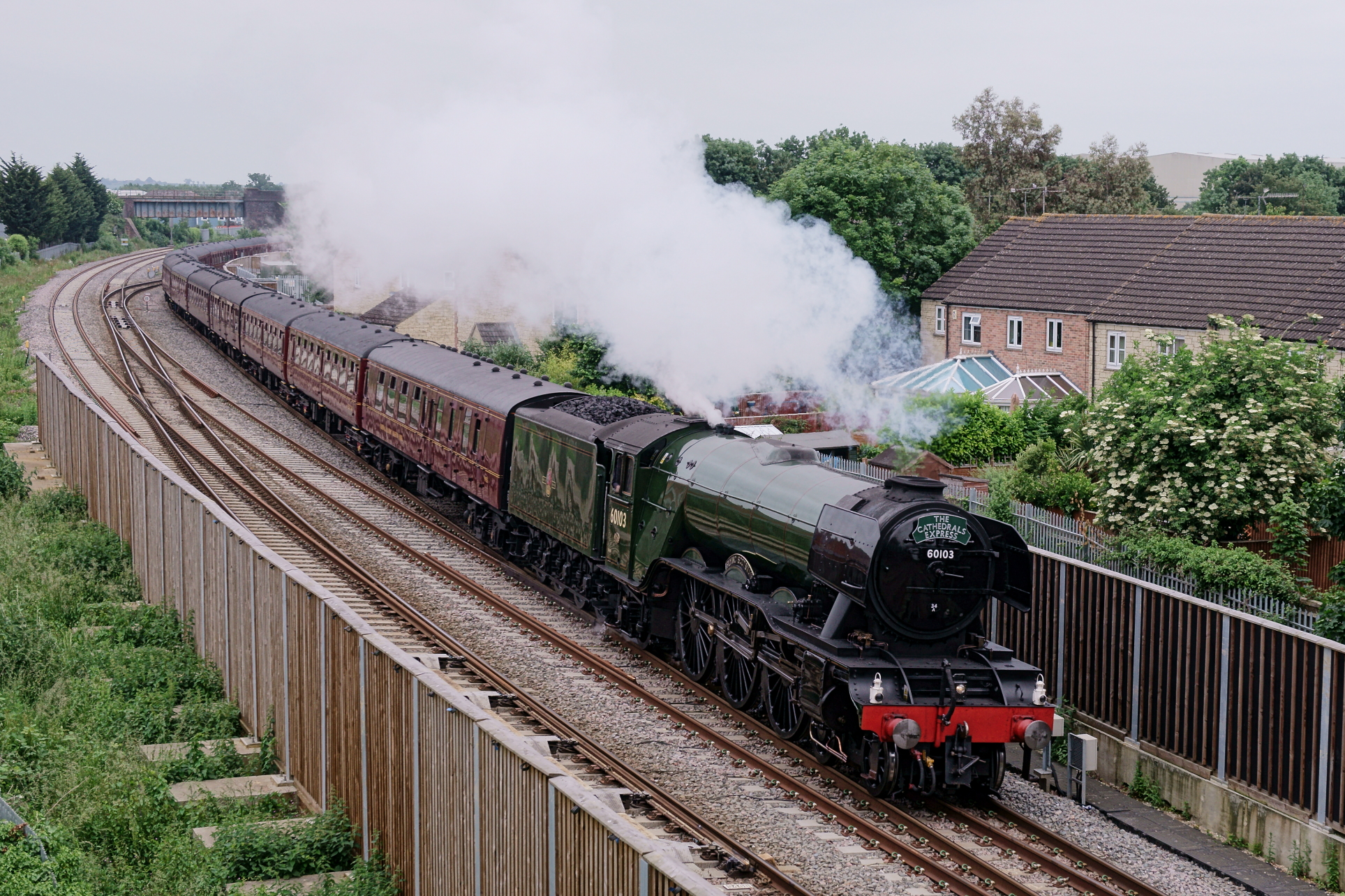
A British heritage passenger train hauled by the historic Flying Scotsman

Heritage trains are often operated by volunteers, often railfans, as a tourist attraction or as a museum railway. Usually, the trains are formed from historic vehicles retired from national commercial operation that have retained or assumed the character, appearance, and operating practices of railways in their time. Sometimes, lines operating in isolation also provide transport facilities for local people. Much of the equipment used on these trains' systems is original or at least aims to replicate both the look and the operating practices of historic/former railway companies.

=== History ===
In 1930, an experimental railcar –the Rail Zeppelin– was constructed, which set the speed record for petrol trains. Other early examples where the 1931 U.S. Bullet and the 1932 German prototype Flying Hamburger, following a production series later renamed VT 04. In the U.S., technology advanced with the introduction of the 1934 M-10000 prototype, soon followed by the Pioneer Zephyr and the 1935 Hiawatha. These and other examples led to a report by a U.S. statistics body that collected data and examined various lightweight passenger trains. One of the few lightweight trains built in the U.S. after the war, the Keystone, only had limited success.

Another notable example was the Talgo I prototype that was tested in Spain between 1942 and 1944. The GM Aerotrain was partially based on the Talgo II and used in passenger service between 1956 and 1966. Talgo trains are used on the Spanish high-speed network; both the Deutsche Bahn (DB) and Danske Statsbaner (DSB) have ordered higher-speed trains for cross border long distance routes.

In the UK in the 1950s, the British Transport Commission (BTC) installed a committee to maintain branch lines by using lightweight trains. For India's higher-speed network, 16 lightweight cars were ordered in 2023. In France, the TELLi project aims to do the same by introducing new lightweight trains starting in 2029.

== Environmental impact ==
Passenger rail is one of the modes of travel with the lowest carbon dioxide emissions. Rail travel emits much less carbon dioxide per mile than air travel (2–27%) or car travel (2–24%).

== See also ==
- Passenger rail terminology
- Passenger train toilet
- Drumhead (sign)
- Headboard (train)
- Luxury trains
