= Komet (train) =

High speed train service

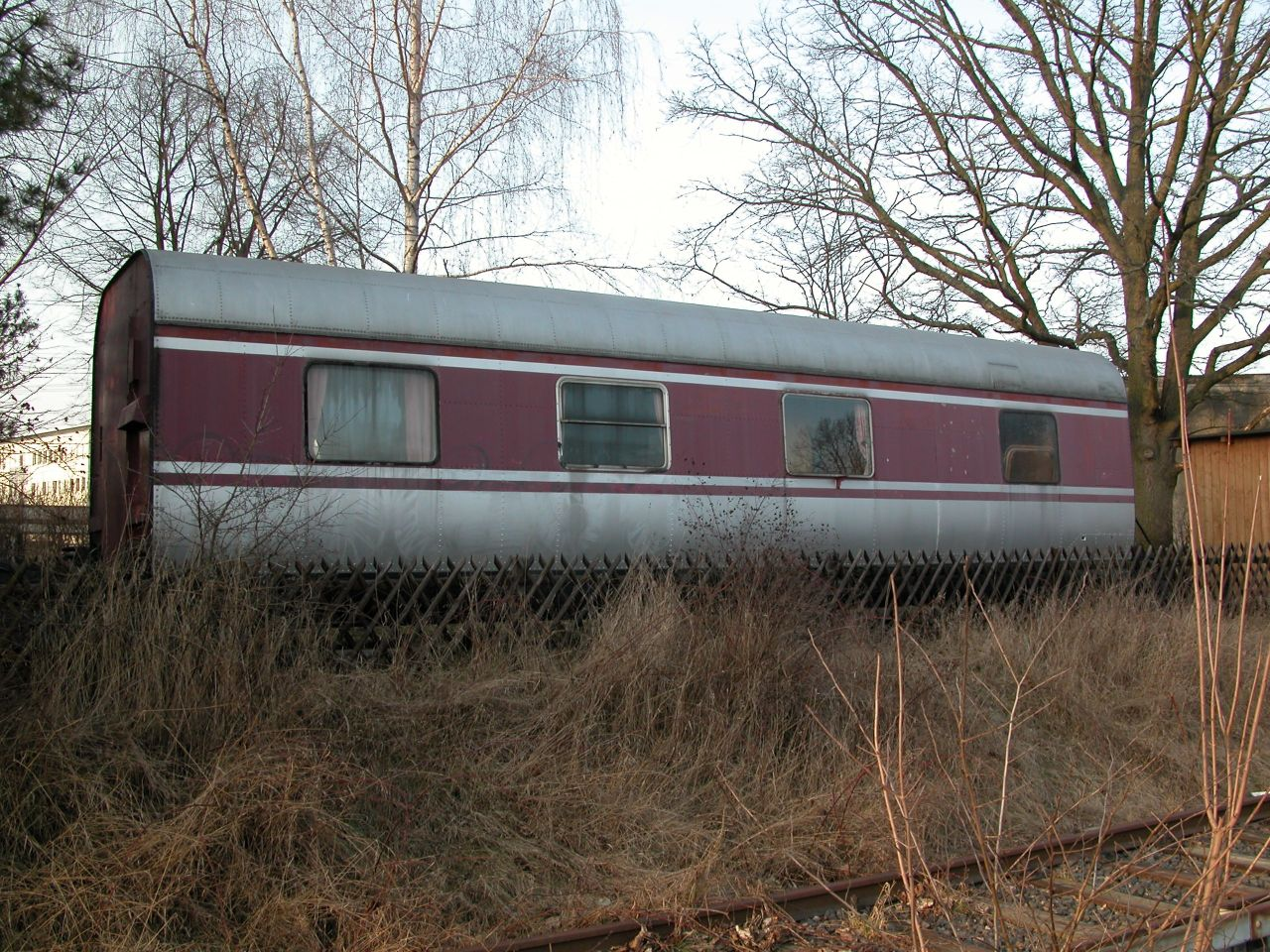
- VT 10.5 car stored in Nürnberg

Overview
- Service type: F-Zug (1954–1987); EuroCity (EC) (1987–1991); D-Zug (express) (1991–1995); EN/CNL (1995–2016)
- Status: discontinued
- Locale: Germany; Switzerland
- First service: 15 May 1954
- Last service: 11 December 2016
- Successor: nightjet
- Former operator(s): DSG; Deutsche Bundesbahn; DACH Hotelzug AG; CityNightLine AG; Deutsche Bahn

Route
- Termini: Hamburg; Zürich

Technical
- Track gauge: 1,435 mm (4 ft 8 1/2 in)
- Electrification: 15 kV AC

The Komet (German for The Comet) was an international overnight express train service between Hamburg, Germany and cities in Switzerland, which was in operation from 1954 to 2016. Its name reflected the notion that the Comet train and an actual comet can both be described as travelling through the night at high speed. It was introduced in 1954. It became a EuroCity (EC) service upon the launch of the EC network in 1987. It became categorised as CityNightLine (CNL) service in the mid-1990s. With the decision by Deutsche Bahn to terminate all CNL services in December 2016, the Komet ran for the last time on 10–11 December 2016.

== Preparation and first era ==
After the creation of the Deutsche Bundesbahn (German Federal Railway) on 13 December 1951, the new railway company set up a long-distance network (F-Zug). Between Hamburg and Switzerland two services were planned: the day service Senator and the night service Komet. The new services needed rolling stock as well, and at that time experiments were carried out to develop new trainsets for the new services. Railway engineer Franz Kruckenberg, who already had experimented with new trains, e.g. the Railzeppelin, before the Second World War, designed a lightweight train, the VT 10.5. Two diesel multiple-units (DMUs) were built. The day-service version, 10.501, was ordered by Deutsche Bundesbahn from manufacturer Linke-Hofmann-Busch (LHB). The night-service version, 10.551, was ordered by the German Sleeper and Dining Car Company (DSG) from Wegmann & Co.

DSG introduced the Komet on 15 May 1954, using their VT 10.5 DMU, operating between Hamburg and Basel. It operated three days a week and carried only first- and second-class sleeping cars and a dining car. The Deutsche Bundesbahn took over the operation by 1 January 1955. The VT 10.5 was withdrawn from service on 20 December 1960 and replaced by locomotive-hauled coaches. By at least the early 1960s, the Komet was operating seven days a week, and its route had been extended from Basel to Chur, Switzerland.

== EuroCity era ==
On 31 May 1987, the Komet was one of the eight initial night services in the then-new EuroCity (EC) network. Its route continued to be Hamburg – Chur, and it operated seven days a week on this route, carrying sleeping cars and couchette cars only. One day a week, in summer and winter only, the EC Komet also carried through coaches (sleeping cars and couchettes) from Hamburg to Brig; these were carried southbound on Fridays and northbound on Saturdays. On the portion within Switzerland, the train was not designated as an EC.

On 2 June 1991, the Komet lost its EuroCity status and was reclassified as a German D-Zug (ordinary express train). Its main, daily route was shortened, to Hamburg–Zurich, and both the Chur and Brig through cars ran only on Fridays (returning on Saturdays, northbound).

== CityNightLine ==
In winter 1995/96, the Komet was reclassified as a CityNightLine service, with train numbers EN 470/471. At that time, CityNightLine was a brand name for EuroNight trains operated by DACH Hotelzug A.G.; that company later changed its name to CityNightLine AG. At the start of the summer 1998 timetable period, on 24 May, the Komet's train number classification was changed from EN 470/471 to CNL 470/471, but its status as a CityNightLine category of train did not change. The CityNightLine Komet was continuing to operate as of March 2013. Deutsche Bahn discontinued all of its CityNightLine services effective 11 December 2016. The Komet operated for the last time on the night of 10–11 December 2016, and from 11 December it was replaced by an unnamed Nightjet service running from Hamburg to Zürich via Berlin.

== Works cited ==
- Hajt, Jörg (2001). Das grosse TEE Buch (in German). Bonn/Königswinter: Heel Verlag. ISBN 3-89365-948-X.
- Berndt, Torsten (2002). Reisen 1. Klasse VT 11.5 (in German). Irsee: Märklin.
