= Hermann Föttinger =

German engineer (1877–1945)

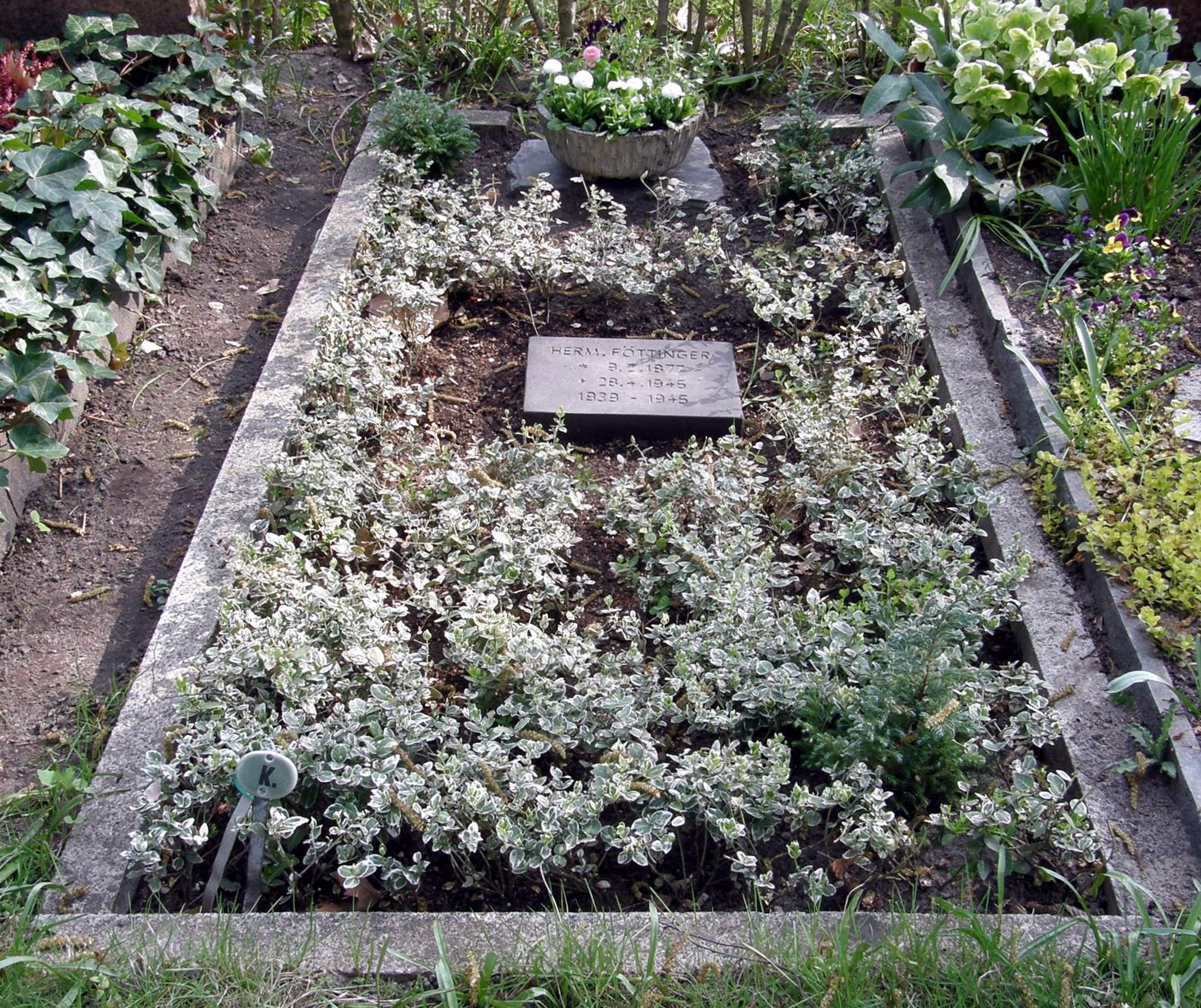
Hermann Föttinger’s grave at the Wilmersdorf Cemetery

Hermann Föttinger (9 February 1877 in Nuremberg – 28 April 1945 in Berlin) was a German engineer and inventor. In the course of his life he submitted over 100 patent applications, but he is most notable for inventing fluid coupling.

== Career ==
From 1895 to 1899 Hermann Föttinger studied electrical engineering at the Technical University of Munich.

=== AG Vulcan Stettin ===
From 1904 he worked as a chief designer in the shipyard AG Vulcan Stettin. He was responsible for the introduction and testing of new steam turbines. During this time he developed the fluid coupling consisting of a pump and a turbine in a unit that in further development resulted in the automatic automobile transmission. His patents from 1905 covered both fluid couplings and torque converters.

=== Technische Hochschule in Danzig ===
In 1909 he obtained a position at the Technische Hochschule in Danzig where he started the institute for fluid dynamics technology.

=== Technische Hochschule Berlin ===
In 1924 he took up a position as head of the current department of physics and turbines at Technische Hochschule Berlin (now Technische Universität Berlin). Here he remained until his death from grenade fragments in April 1945.

== Achievements ==
=== Fluid dynamics ===
Föttinger laid the basis of the fluid dynamics from Euler over Rankine and Hermann von Helmholtz to its current uses in the boundary layer of airplane wings and propulsion theory.

=== Railcars ===
Together with Franz Kruckenberg he started the Flugbahn-Gesellschaft mbH to develop the Schienenzeppelins (railroad cars).

=== Internal combustion engines ===
Föttinger's patents for internal combustion engines include:

- US1636050, Device for damping the oscillations of multiple crank shafts
- US2244453, Scavenging of two-stroke cycle internal combustion engines

== Literature ==
- Hans Jürgen Reuß: ' 'Hermann Föttinger' '. In: Journal (2008) internationally maritime HANSA, 6, S. 58-59. Hamburg: Navigation publishing house "Hansa" C. Schroedter & Co. (Gmbh & Co. KG), 2008.
