= DRG Class SVT 137 =

Class of German diesel railcars

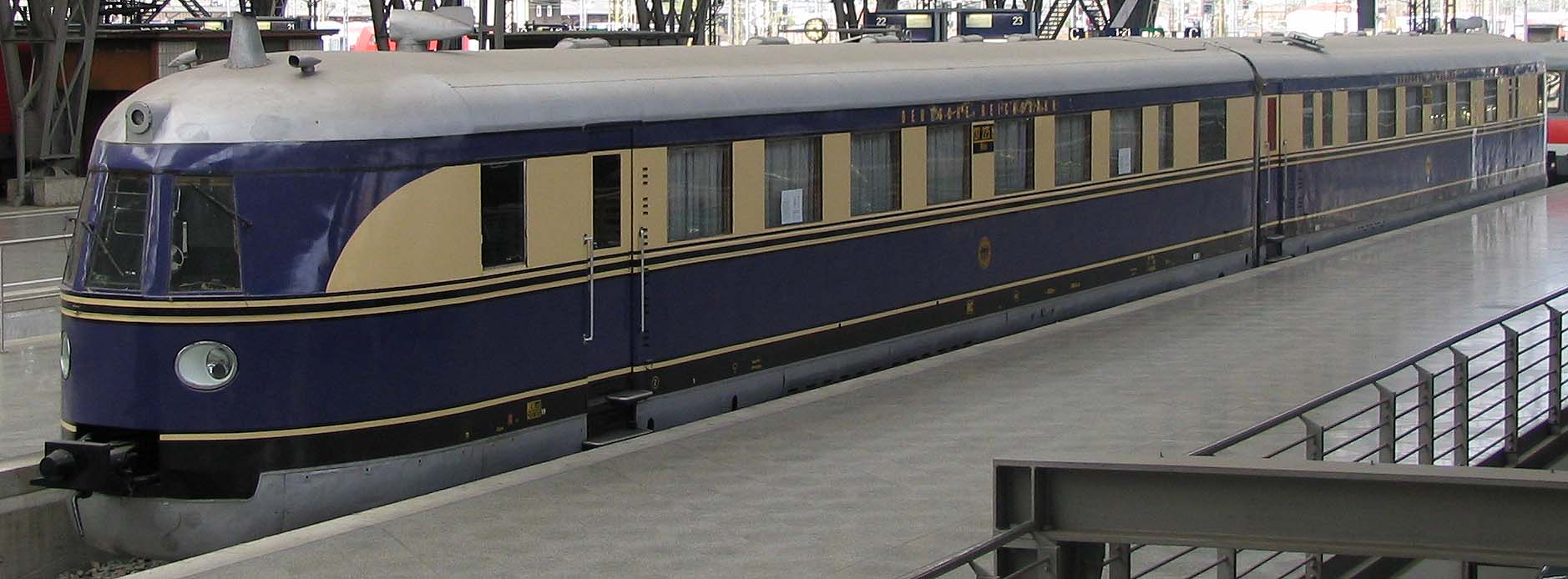
- DRG Class SVT 137 225 at Leipzig Main Station
- Manufacturers: Waggonbau Görlitz, AEG, Linke-Hoffmann, SSW
- Constructed: 1934–36
- Number built: 33

Specifications
- Train length: 44.756–70.2 m (146 ft 10.0 in – 230 ft 3.8 in)
- Maximum speed: 160–205 km/h (99–127 mph)
- Weight: 91.3–160 t (89.9–157.5 long tons; 100.6–176.4 short tons)
- Axle load: 16.7 t (16.4 long tons; 18.4 short tons)
- Engine type: Diesel
- Power output: 604–970 kW (810–1,301 hp)
- Transmission: diesel-electric, diesel-hydraulic
- UIC classification: 2'Bo'2'; 2'Bo'Bo'2; B2'2'B; 2'Bo'+2'2'+Bo'2'

The DRG Class SVT 137 was a class of streamlined diesel railcars of the Deutsche Reichsbahn-Gesellschaft and later of the Deutsche Bundesbahn (as class VT 04) and the Deutsche Reichsbahn. With a regular maximum speed of 160 km/h (99 mph) and average speeds of up to 132 km/h (82 mph) they were the first high speed trains in central Europe.

== Subclasses and Technical Data ==
Based on the prototype DRG Class SVT 877 there were four different subclasses and one experimental train:

- "Bauart Hamburg", two sections, Jacobs bogies, 604 kW (810 hp), 2’Bo’2’, No 137 149 - 152 and No 137 224 - 232
- "Bauart Leipzig", three sections, Jacobs-bogies, 884 kW (1,185 hp), 2'Bo'Bo'2', No 137 153 – 154 and 137 233 – 234, DR 183 251
- "Bauart Köln", three sections, 14 built, conventional bogies "Bauart Görlitz", 882 or 956 kW (1,183 or 1,282 hp), 2'Bo'+2'2'+Bo'2', 160 t, 132 seats, No 137 273 - 278 and 137 851 - 858.
- "Bauart Berlin", four sections including a power/postal car, single slow running diesel 970 kW (1,300 hp), 2'Bo'+2'2'+'2'2'+Bo'2', 210.6 t, 126 seats, No 137 901 - 903
- SVT 137 155, designed by the constructor of the Schienenzeppelin, Franz Kruckenberg, built 1934–1938, diesel-hydraulic, three cars, one powered cars at the head. Did not enter regular service. World speed record of 215 km/h (134 mph) (Hamburg-Berlin), June 23, 1939. The construction led to the DB Class VT 10.5, DB Class VT 11.5 and the DR Class VT 18.16

Most SVT 137 were diesel-electric, the SVT 137 Bauart Leipzig No 137 153 – 154 had a diesel-hydraulic transmission, the SVT No 137 233 – 234 had a diesel-electric transmission. Three sections of the SVT 137 902 were originally from the Dutch NS streamline '36 and used in this train. They didn't return to the NS after the war.

== History ==
Since the success of the SVT 877 "Flying Hamburger" DRG projected a set of Diesel multiple units for a high speed network from Berlin to several German cities. First built 1934/1935, the "Bauart Hamburg" showed some differences to the prototype: The number of seats was 77 instead of 99, the placement of the seats 2+1 instead of 3+1. The Bauart Hamburg was 2.3 m (7 ft 6 1/2 in) longer.

The main line Berlin-Hannover-Cologne started July 1, 1935; the route Berlin-Leipzig-Erfurt-Frankfurt followed August 15, 1935. From 1936 a service Berlin-Nuremberg-Munich/Stuttgart was initiated for a real success and struggling their routes.

On February 17, 1936, the "Bauart Leipzig" achieved a world speed record of 205 km/h (127 mph). These trains did the route Berlin-Breslau-Beuthen (now: Berlin-Wrocław-Bytom) from May 15, 1936. The scheduled time was 4:17 h, meaning an average speed of 109 km/h (68 mph).

The SVT service was halted in August, 1939. During World War II some of the trains were used by the Wehrmacht as military trains.

After World War II some of the SVT 137 were handed over to other states. The SVT 137 274 was used in the American occupation zone; it was later transported to Fort Eustis, Virginia, USA, as a "technical interesting object". SVT 137 852 served the CSD in 1949 on the line Prague-Bratislava. SVT 137 855 entered service at the SZD USSR as trainset DP-14.

The remaining SVT 137 were used by the Deutsche Bundesbahn as VT 04 / VT 06 and the Deutsche Reichsbahn as class 137, later class 183.

DRG SVT 137 225 "Bauart Hamburg" (picture above) was used by the GDR government until 1975. In 1991 this train was repainted in its original colours. Today it is exhibited at Leipzig Hauptbahnhof.
