= Franz Kruckenberg =

German aeronautical engineer (1882–1965)

Franz Friedrich Kruckenberg
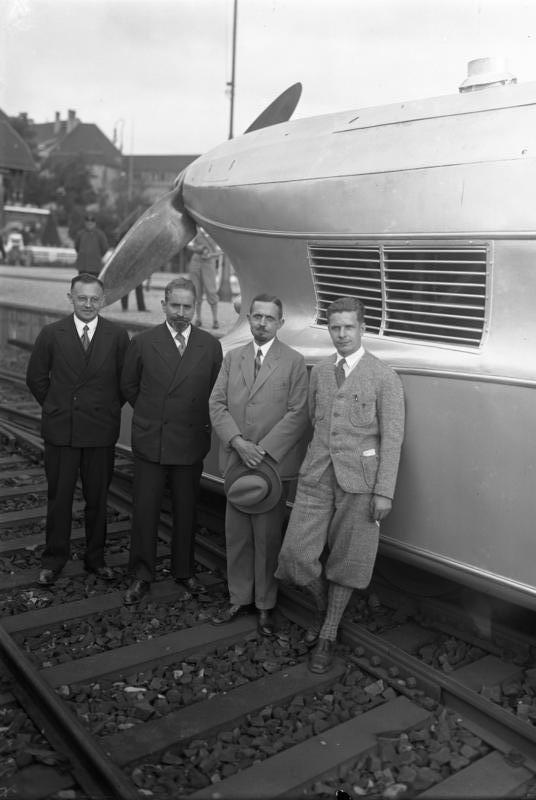
- Kruckenberg (2nd from the left) in front of the Schienenzeppelin
- Born: 21 August 1882; Uetersen, Germany
- Died: 19 June 1965 (aged 82); Heidelberg, Germany
- Education: ship building
- Engineering career
- Discipline: aerodynamics
- Significant design: Schienenzeppelin
- Significant advance: high speed trains

Franz Friedrich Kruckenberg (August 21st 1882 – June 19th 1965) was an engineer and pioneer of high speed railway systems. He designed several high speed trains. His most famous design was the Schienenzeppelin.

Kruckenberg was born into an old-established Hamburg merchant family. From 1904 to 1907 he studied mechanical engineering at the Technische Hochschule Charlottenburg in Berlin, graduating in naval engineering. Before World War I he designed aircraft and airships. Even then he already criticised airships because of their explosive hydrogen filling; and the civil use of aircraft because of their high fuel- and maintenance costs.

== The revolutionary Schienenzeppelin ==
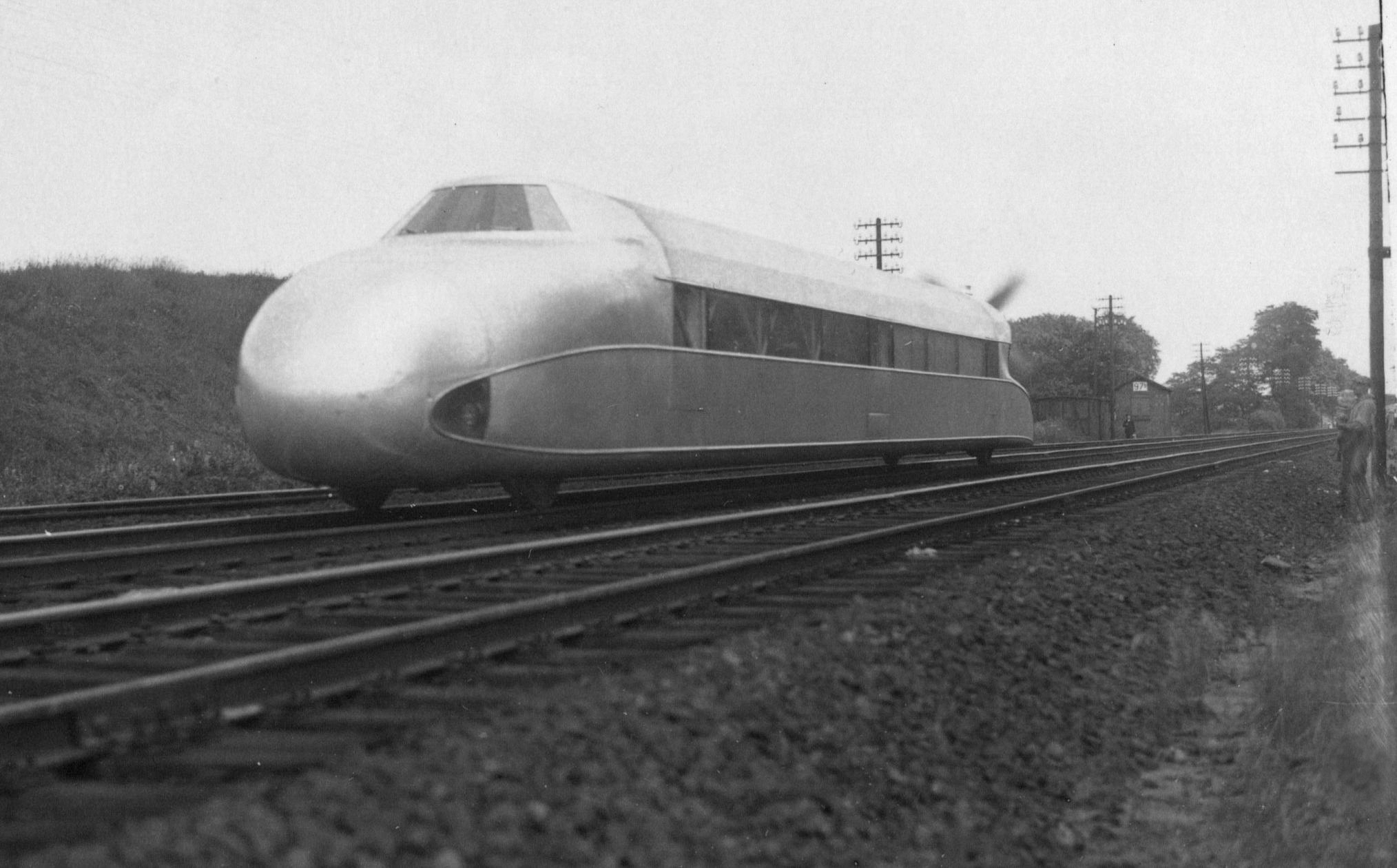
Schienenzeppelin at Erkrath-Hochdahl steep ramp

After the first World War he opened an engineering consultancy in Heidelberg. Initially he worked on a hanging monorail concept, but could not get the financing for a prototype. Later together with Hermann Föttinger he founded the Flugbahn-Gesellschaft mbH to build a high-speed propeller driven train, the "Schienenzeppelin". The first test runs were carried out on 25 September 1930 between Kreiensen and Altenbeken on the Braunschweig-Paderborn line.

On 21 June 1931 his Schienenzeppelin made the first run on the Hamburg-Berlin line. Between Ludwigslust and Wittenberge the Schienenzeppelin achieved a world speed record for trains of 230.2 km/h (143.0 mph). It was the fastest railcar in the world for more than 20 years. A major problem was the propeller, causing noise and wind. Kruckenberg rebuilt the Schienenzeppelin to a hydraulically driven car, which still had a top speed of 180 km/h (110 mph) with only 441 kW.

The Schienenzeppelin was revolutionary for its time, since the aerodynamic streamline profile and the light weight design were proven as feasible features for high speed railways. While Kruckenberg's ideas continue to influence high speed train design today (ICE, Acela, TGV, AVE) the Schienenzeppelin was scrapped in 1939.

== SVT 137 - prototype for following high speed trains ==
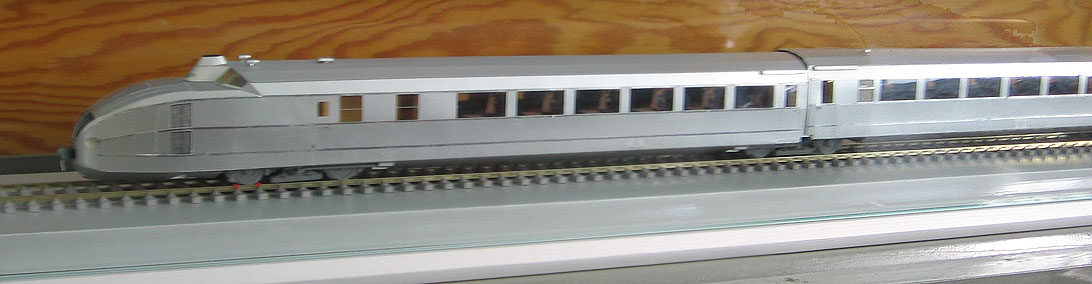
Svt 137 155 (scale model)

After the Schienenzeppelin Kruckenberg designed the DRG Class SVT 137 155 in 1934. This prototype of a three car diesel railcar had a diesel-hydraulic transmission and was ready for service in 1938. On a test run, on 23 June 1939, this train achieved a world speed record for diesel trains of 215 km/h between Hamburg and Berlin. Parts of that train set are still preserved in Dresden.

After World War II Kruckenberg designed the DB Class VT 10.5 express daytime ("Senator", 7 car set) and night sleeper ("Komet", 8 car set) following the SVT 137 155 ideas. Many of the "Senator" design features were additionally based around the Talgo concept. Both trains were of unprecedented light weight construction of 0.92 t/seat, but had disadvantages in maintenance due to their six engine concept (four Diesel engines for propulsion, two for electricity generation). Thus they were taken out of service in 1959 and 1960 respectively.

Later the DB Class VT 11.5 ("TEE") und DR Class VT 18.16 ("Vindobona") DMUs were derived from Kruckenberg's SVT 137 155 concept.

== Literature ==
- Gottwaldt, Alfred (2006). Der Schienenzeppelin. Franz Kruckenberg und die Reichsbahn-Schnelltriebwagen der Vorkriegszeit 1929-1939. Freiburg: Ek. ISBN 978-3-88255-134-1.
- Gottwaldt, Alfred (1972). Schienenzeppelin. Franz Kruckenberg und die Reichsbahn-Schnelltriebwagen der Vorkriegszeit 1929-1939. Augsburg: Rösler und Zimmer.
