= Waggonbau Görlitz =

German company

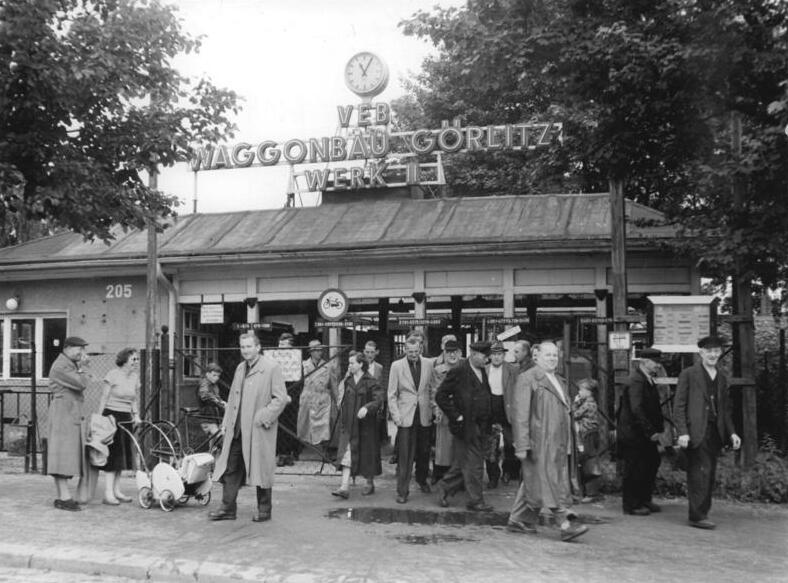
Waggonbau Görlitz 1959

The Waggonbau Görlitz Corporation (Görlitz Rolling Stock Corporation) was a manufacturer of locomotives and rolling stock established in the German city of Görlitz in 1849. They are best known for the double-decker rail cars that had been in production since 1935. In 1998 the plant was acquired by Bombardier Transportation to produce the Bombardier Double-deck Coach brand (not to be confused with the North American Bombardier BiLevel Coaches). From 2021 to 2025 it belonged to Alstom.

In 2025 it was sold to arms manufacturer KNDS, and from 2026 produces tanks such as the Leopard 2 for the German army. It remained open for the remainder of 2025 to finish orders of the Twindexx Dosto for Israel Railways and several trams. Around 400 employees were retained.

On 16 December 2025 the last train wagon was delivered.

== History ==
The company's origins go back to saddlemaker Johann Christoph Lüders who opened his workshop on June 5, 1828, in Görlitz at the Obermarkt. A year later in April 1829 he moved to the Langengasse and began building coaches, and later moved to a larger workshop at Demianiplatz. On October 18, 1849, Lüders and Conrad Schiedt won a public tender from the municipality of Görlitz for the construction of two rail cars to transport timber from the Görlitzer Heide (Görlitz Heath). Schiedt owned a metal works shop in the Büttnergasse producing the iron parts required for the otherwise wooden rail coaches. Lüders moved the rolling stock manufactory to the Brunnenstrasse the same year.

The rolling stock works continued to flourish during the expansion of rail transport in Germany and the German Customs Union. Already in 1852, it delivered 81 rail cars and by the end of the year the factory employed 205 men from nine trades. Lüders bought a number of buildings at Brunnenstrasse and established a factory with steam hammers in 1853 at the site – the beginning of industrial production. The number of employees grew to 500 in 1862. The rail car deliveries grew to 300 in 1856 and 426 in 1869 including military equipment. In 1869 Lüders agreed to sell the factories to the Berlin merchant J. Mamroth for 600,000 thaler.

The new owner reorganized the works into a stock corporation to allow for further expansion. The initial public offering of 800,000 thalers on February 3, 1869 was oversubscribed, with 2,000,000 thalers of shares sold by February 10. On May 26, the Lüders factories were bought by the stock corporation that registered on June 21, 1869. Lüders was offered a position of technical director but declined – the first director was to be Heinrich August Samann. In 1872, the company built 2,000 rail cars (mostly baggage cars and freight cars), employing 1,222 workers. Due to rising costs for raw material, the first dividends were not paid out until 1875.

In 1921, the Waggonfabrik Görlitz (Görlitz Rolling Stock Factory) merged with the Görlitzer Maschinenbau AG (Görlitz Engineering Corporation) and the Cottbuser Maschinenbau-Anstalt und Eisengießerei AG (Cottbus Engineering and Iron Foundry Corporation) to the WUMAG - Waggon- und Maschinenbau Aktiengesellschaft Görlitz (Görlitz Rolling Stock and Engineering Corporation). Due to financial troubles, as many as eight corporations founded the EISLIG (Eisenbahn-Liefergemeinschaft GmbH - Railway Supply Union Ltd) the same year, but WUMAG's participation only lasted until December 1925 as it was deemed unprofitable for them. However, during that time was the presentation of the Drehgestell Bauart Görlitz (Bogie Class Görlitz) that came to be a market success – and they are still in production.

In 1935, the first double-decker coaches were built for the Lübeck-Büchen Railway Company to serve lines in Hamburg.

Under Nazi Germany, the factories were reorganized to serve the military buildup. During World War II, the number of German workers dropped from 2,322 to 1,478 while the number of forced laborers grew to 1,974 from a nearby concentration camp. After the war, the Soviet occupiers ordered the disassembly of the factories for war reparations. During that time, a great fire on August 7/8, 1945 destroyed most of the remaining rolling stock factory. The remains of Factory I (Werk I) were handed over to German administration on September 10, 1945, the Factory II (Werk II) on January 25, 1946.

The German administration began to rebuild the factories. After the former management fled to the west, Otto Schuhknecht and Willi Gerlach became the new directors. Due to reconstruction requirements a number of orders came from the Deutsche Reichsbahn, and the number of workers rose to 242 in December 1945 and 1,500 by the end of 1946. In that the time the engineering works were spun off into a new WUMAG Engineering Corporation to carry on the name, while the rail car construction was put under the new name of VEB Waggonbau Görlitz (Görlitz Rolling Stock State Corporation). This would be included in the LOWA group (Lokomotiv- und Waggonbau - locomotive and rail car construction) in 1948.

The company started to produce a wide range of products apart from rail cars. The number of employees rose to 5,754 by the end of 1950. The company became a major supplier of railway companies throughout the Eastern Bloc, and between 1970 and 1983 turnover doubled to 294.5 million Mark. Although bogie production was moved to Vetschau, the company's high demand for workers led to Polish foreign workers being employed since 1988. At the end of 1988, the numbers showed 3,576 German workers along with 240 Polish workers producing 337 rail cars including 115 double-deck coaches.

With the German reunification the company was reorganized - state-owned enterprises were subject to privatization and the Görlitz factories became owned by Waggonbau Görlitz GmbH (Görlitz Rolling Stock Ltd), as of May 1, 1990 a subsidiary of DWA (Deutsche Waggonbau Aktiengesellschaft - German Rolling Stock Joint Stock Corporation). The DWA would later rename the Görlitz rolling stock facilities into DWA Werk Görlitz (DWA Factories Görlitz) and it would be rebuilt into a competence center for double-deck coaches and ICE T coaches. On July 5, 1995 the 5,000th double-deck coach was delivered to Deutsche Bahn. DWA was sold to private equity firm Advent International in March 1996.

On August 29, 1996, Deutsche Bahn ordered of 58 double-deck coaches and 192 rail coaches with an option for another 350 coaches. On the November 28, 1996, a new construction building (7,000 square meters) was opened at Factory II and in 1997 the Factory I site was closed down. At the end of 1996, the numbers showed 1,200 employees and 105 apprentices. In 1997 negotiations began with Bombardier Transportation which led to the integration of DWA into Bombardier on February 2, 1998. On April 3, 1998, the first ICE-T was delivered and beginning 1998/1999 the first DBAG Class 445 trains were delivered, also known as Bombardier Double-deck Electrical Multiple Units Intercity trains.

Deutsche Bahn continued to order delivery of double-deck coaches from its contract in 1996. Further double-deck coaches were developed for Israel and Denmark. Some more double-deck coaches were sold to Luxembourg and the Netherlands, and finally in 2008 the first double-deck cars for Poland were built (after 20 years and the fall of the Eastern Bloc). Some factories were closed down in reorganizations while other buildings were rebuilt, and by the end of 2008 the Görlitz rolling stock facilities had 1,212 employees and 49 apprentices.

On January 5, 2009, Deutsche Bahn ordered 800 double-deck coaches of the new 2010 Generation from Bombardier, and by the end of 2010 another contract for 135 Intercity double-deck EMUs was achieved. The new double-deck rail cars were able to win other public tenders throughout Europe such that the factories produced at full capacity up to 2014.

After acquiring Bombardier, Alstom announced plans in 2024 to close the plant and shift production to Poland by mid-2026, despite an agreement with union IG Metall the previous year where employees waived the right to €34 million in vacation pay to secure their future employment.

The employees organized a ceremony to commemorate the last 3 wagons built in the factory on 20 October 2025.

== Products ==
The following is a selection of rail cars built at Görlitz:

| Picture | Designation | Notes | Production company | Build Years |
|---|---|---|---|---|
| | AT3; Wittfeld-Akkumulatortriebwagen | Entire Train | Königlich Preußische Staatseisenbahn | 1910–1914 |
| | Straßenbahnmotorwagen T24 | Entire Train | Berliner Straßenbahn | 1925 |
| | BVG-Baureihe A | Entire Train | Berliner Verkehrsgesellschaft | 1924–1925 |
| | ET 169; Bauart Bernau | Entire Train | Deutsche Reichsbahn Gesellschaft | 1924–1925 |
| | Straßenbahnmotorwagen | Entire Tram | Straßenbahn Den Haag | 1925 |
| | ET 89; Rübezahl | Entire Train | Deutsche Reichsbahn Gesellschaft | 1926 |
| | ET 168; Bauart Oranienburg | Entire Train | Deutsche Reichsbahn Gesellschaft | 1926 |
| | AT 585–588, AT 591–592 | Entire Train | Deutsche Reichsbahn Gesellschaft | 1927 |
| | Straßenbahnmotorwagen | Entire Train | Straßenbahn Frankfurt (Oder) | 1927 |
| | HHA-Baureihe A | Entire Train | Hamburger Hochbahn | 1927–1928, 1940, 1943 |
| | ET 165 | Entire Train | Deutsche Reichsbahn Gesellschaft | 1927–1929 |
| | VT 757 - 762 | Entire Train | Deutsche Reichsbahn Gesellschaft | 1927–1929 |
| | Straßenbahnmotorwagen | Entire Train | Straßenbahn Görlitz | 1928 |
| | SVT 877; Fliegender Hamburger | Entire Train | Deutsche Reichsbahn Gesellschaft | 1932 |
| | VT 137 005–009 und VT 137 036–047; Bauarten Berlin, Erfurt, Hannover, Köln und Wuppertal | Entire Train | Deutsche Reichsbahn Gesellschaft | 1933–1934 |
| | SVT 137 149–152 und SVT 137 242–232; Bauart Hamburg | Entire Train | Deutsche Reichsbahn Gesellschaft | 1935–1936 |
| | Doppelstockzwillingssteuerwagen | Entire Train | Lübeck-Büchener Eisenbahn | 1936–1937 |
| | VT 137 288–295; Bauart Ruhr | Entire Train | Deutsche Reichsbahn | 1938 |
| | VT 137 326–376; Bauart Stettin | Entire Train | Deutsche Reichsbahn | 1940–1941 |
| | Oberleitungsrevisionstriebwagen BR 135.7 | Entire Train | Deutsche Reichsbahn, Polnische Staatsbahn, Tschechoslowakische Staatsbahn | 1955–1957, 1959–1961 |
| | Oberleitungsrevisionstriebwagen BR 137.7 | Entire Train | Deutsche Reichsbahn, Polnische Staatsbahn, Tschechoslowakische Staatsbahn | 1957, 1963–1964, 1968 |
| | Doppelstockzug | Entire Train, 2 sections | Deutsche Reichsbahn | 1955 |
| | Doppelstockzug | Entire Train, 4 sections | Bulgarische Staatsbahn, Deutsche Reichsbahn, Polnische Staatsbahn, Rumänische Staatsbahn, Tschechoslowakische Staatsbahn | 1952–1957, 1961–1963, 1965–1977 |
| | Doppelstockgliederzug | Entire Train, 5 sections | Deutsche Reichsbahn | 1957–1960 |
| | VT 18.16; SVT Bauart Görlitz | Entire Train | Deutsche Reichsbahn | 1963–1968 |
| | Doppelstockgliederzug | Entire Train, 5 sections | Deutsche Reichsbahn | 1970–1971 |
| | Doppelstockeinzelwagen | Entire Train, 1. Generation, Middle and Drive Wagon | Bulgarische Staatsbahn, Deutsche Reichsbahn, Polnische Staatsbahn, Rumänische Staatsbahn, Tschechoslowakische Staatsbahn | 1973–1974, 1976–1991 |
| | Oberleitungsrevisionstriebwagen BR 188.3 | Entire Train | Deutsche Reichsbahn | 1987, 1989–1991 |
| | Doppelstockwagen | Entire Train, 2. Generation, Middle and Drive Wagon | Deutsche Reichsbahn, Deutsche Bundesbahn | 1992–1993 |
| | Doppelstockschlafwagen | Construction of Wagon | Deutsche Bahn | 1994–1995 |
| | Doppelstockwagen | Entire Train, 3. Generation, Middle and Drive Wagon | Deutsche Bahn | 1994–1997 |
| | RIC-Schlafwagen | Wagon Only | Litauische Eisenbahn, Russische Eisenbahnen, Eisenbahnen der Slowakischen Republik, Ukrainische Eisenbahn, Weißrussische Eisenbahn | 1994–1997 |
| | Doppelstockwagen | Entire Train, 4. Generation, Middle and Drive Wagon | Dänische Staatsbahn, Deutsche Bahn, Israelische Staatsbahn, Masovian Railways, Luxemburgische Staatsbahn, metronom | 1997 - 2021 |
| | BR 411 & 415; ICE-T | Drive Wagon | Deutsche Bahn | 1998–2001 |
| | BR 445; Meridian | Prototype, 2006 dissambled | Deutsche Bahn | 1998–1999 |
| | Doppelstockinterregiowagen | Construction of Wagon | Niederländische Bahn | 2008–2009 |
| | Metrozüge; Movia | Entire Train | Metro Delhi | 2009–2010 |
| | Twindexx | Entire Train, 5. Generation, Middle, Drive Wagon and Lokomotive | Deutsche Bahn | 2011–2020 |
| | Twindexx Swiss Express | Entire Train | Schweizerische Bundesbahnen | 2011–2020 |
| | ICE 4 | Construction of Wagon | Deutsche Bahn | 2020–2023 |
