= DRG Class SVT 877 =

German diesel train (1932–1957)

DR 877 a/b Flying Hamburger (Fliegender Hamburger)
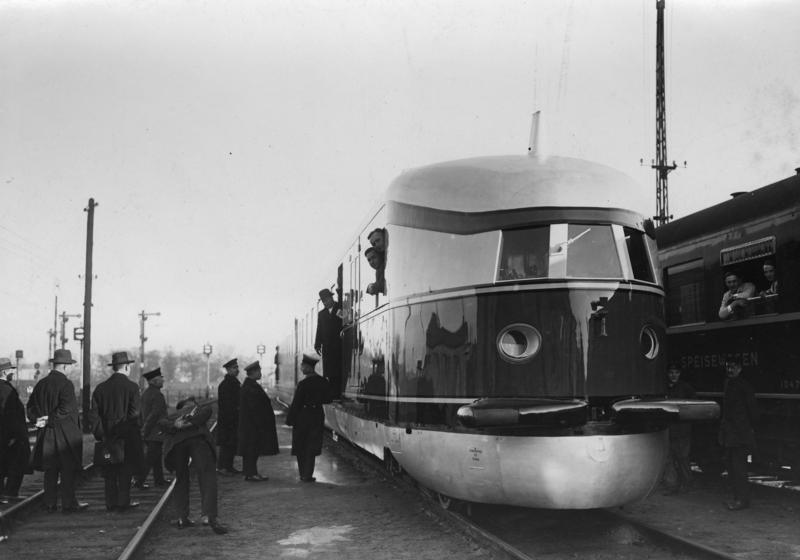
- The express unit before its first trial run to at Lehrter station in Berlin.
- In service: 1932–1957
- Manufacturer: WUMAG
- Constructed: 1932
- Number built: One 2-car set
- Fleet numbers: DRG: 877a/b; DB: VT04 000a/b
- Operators: Deutsche Reichsbahn (1932–1939); Deutsche Bundesbahn (1949–1957)

Specifications
- Train length: 41,920 mm (137 ft 6 3/8 in) over buffers
- Width: 2,830 mm (9 ft 3 3/8 in)
- Height: 4,080 mm (13 ft 4 5/8 in)
- Wheel diameter: Driving: 1,000 mm (3 ft 3 3/8 in); Carrying: 900 mm (2 ft 11 3/8 in)
- Wheelbase: 37,250 mm (122 ft 2 1/2 in)
- Maximum speed: 160 km/h (99 mph)
- Weight: Empty: 77.4 t (76.2 long tons; 85.3 short tons); Service: 85.0 t (83.7 long tons; 93.7 short tons)
- Prime mover: Maybach G05 (× 2)
- Engine type: 12-cyl diesel engine
- Traction motors: 2 × 302 kW (405 hp)
- Power output: 604 kW (810 hp)
- Transmission: Diesel-electric
- UIC classification: 2′Bo′2′
- Track gauge: 1,435 mm (4 ft 8 1/2 in)

The DRG Class SVT 877 Hamburg Flyer – sometimes also Flying Hamburger or in German Fliegender Hamburger – was Germany's first fast diesel train, and is credited with establishing the fastest regular railway connection in the world in its time. Correctly named the Baureihe SVT 877 (later DB Baureihe VT 04 000 a/b), the diesel-electric powered train was used to carry passengers on the Berlin–Hamburg line (roughly 286 km or 178 mi). It entered service in 1933.

== Development and technical data ==
The Hamburg Flyer, a train consisting of two cars – each having a driver's cab and passenger cabin – was ordered by the Deutsche Reichsbahn-Gesellschaft in 1932 from Waggonbau Görlitz (WUMAG). The train was delivered in 1932 and put into service in 1933.

The train was streamlined after wind tunnel experiments, a sort of research which was pioneered by the developers of the high-speed interurban railcar Bullet a couple of years before. The Fliegender Hamburger design was very similar to the Bullet's. Its lightweight, articulated construction and Jakobs bogies were also known on the US interurban scene. However, the Fliegender Hamburger had diesel-electric propulsion. Each of the two coaches had a 12-cylinder Maybach diesel engine with a direct current generator directly coupled to it, which drove a Tatzlager traction motor. The two engines developed a combined power of 604 kW (810 hp).

The train had a pneumatic brake developed by Knorr-Bremse and an electromagnetic rail brake. At 160 kilometres per hour (99 mph), it needed 800 metres (2,600 ft) to come to a halt.

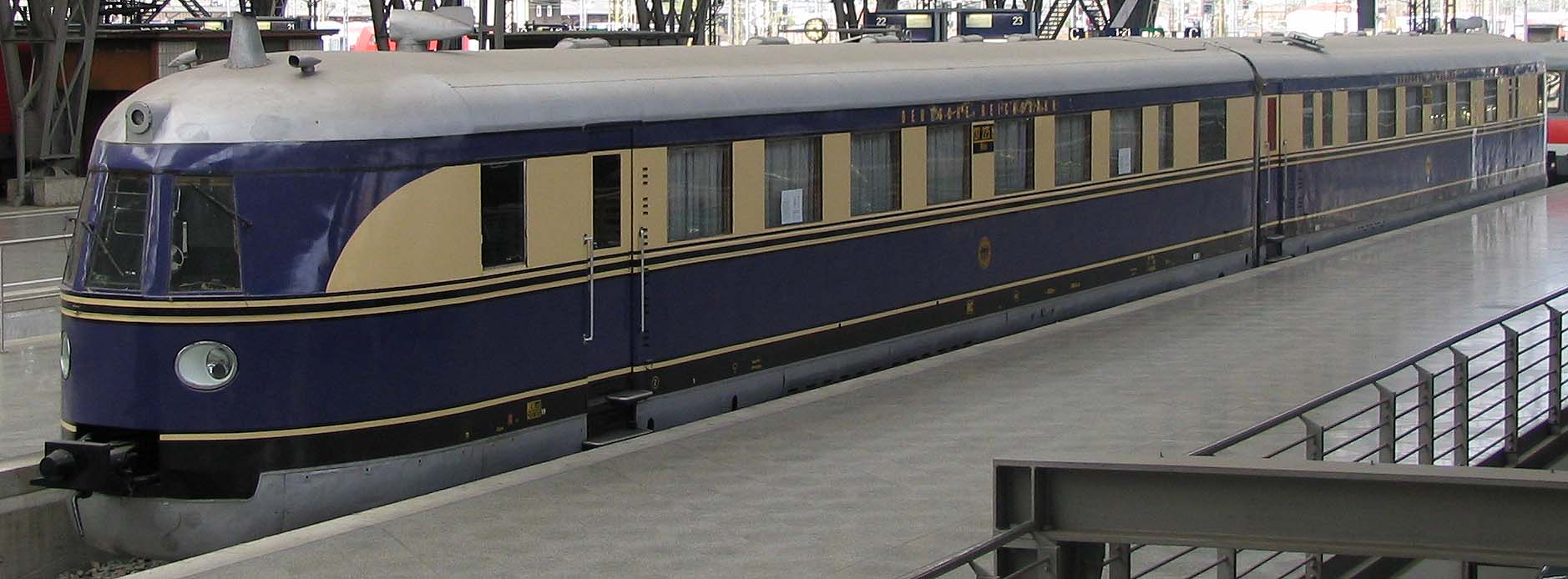
DRG Class SVT 137 Hamburg (not the Flyer) at Leipzig main station

The train had 98 seats in two saloon coaches and a four-seat buffet. The Hamburg Flyer was the prototype for the later trains of the DRG Class SVT 137, which were called Hamburg, Leipzig, Köln and Berlin.

As a sign of its exclusivity, the Hamburg Flyer was painted cream and violet – like the coaches of the Rheingold Express train.

The success of this design led Henschel to develop the streamlined and steam-powered Henschel-Wegmann Train in 1935 which boasted a comparable performance on the routes between Berlin and Dresden.

== Employment by the Deutsche Reichsbahn ==
From 15 May 1933, the train ran regularly between Berlin (Lehrter Bahnhof) and Hamburg's central station. The train travelled the 286 kilometres (178 mi) in 138 minutes – an average speed of 124 kilometres per hour (77 mph). This performance was only equalled 64 years later, as the Deutsche Bahn began to use ICE trains between the two cities in May 1997.

During World War II, the diesel trains saw no service. After 1945 they were confiscated by the French occupation army and were used in France until 1949. The Deutsche Bahn put them into service again up to 1957, but with a red painted hull and a new type number (VT 04 000). Only the driver's cab, the engine compartment and the saloon are preserved, the other parts were scrapped; the existing remains are preserved in the Nuremberg Transport Museum. A set of the Series SVT 137, which had previously been refitted for DDR government use, is preserved complete at Leipzig station.

== See also ==
- Land speed record for railed vehicles
- Luxtorpeda
- Schienenzeppelin
- Class M 290.0 (Tatra 68)
