= Schienenzeppelin =

Experimental locomotive

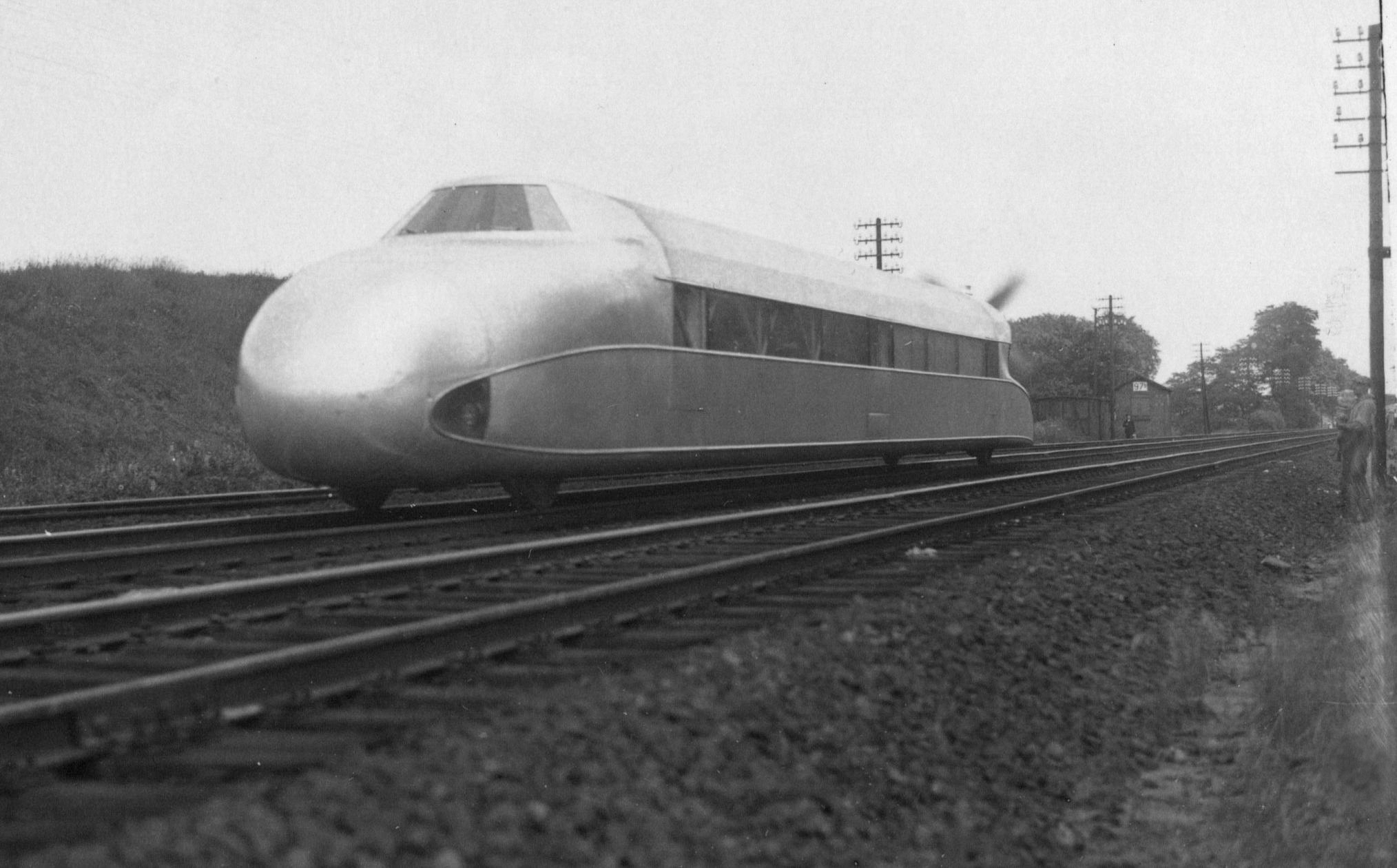
- Schienenzeppelin at Erkrath-Hochdahl steep ramp

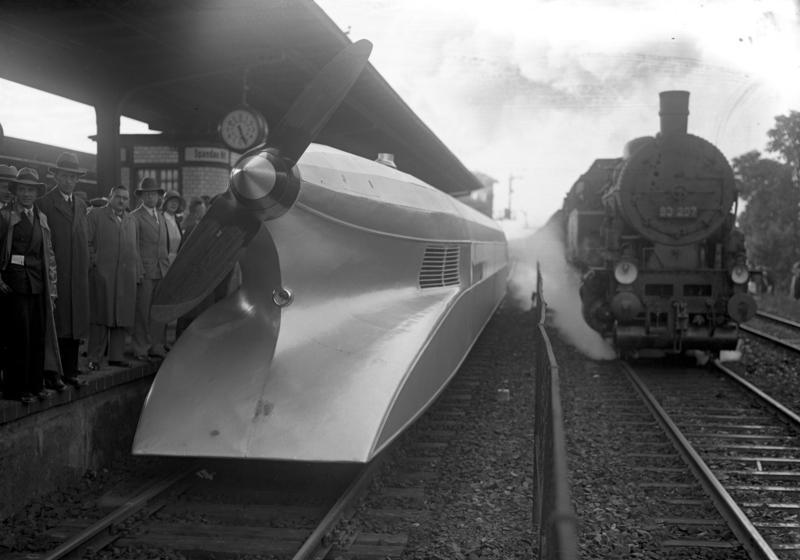
- Rear view, showing the two-bladed propeller
- Manufacturer: Franz Kruckenberg
- Built at: Hannover-Leinhausen (DR)
- Constructed: 1929
- Scrapped: 1939
- Number built: 1
- Capacity: 40 people

Specifications
- Car body construction: Aluminium
- Car length: 25.85 m (84 ft 9 3/4 in)
- Height: 2.8 m (9 ft 2 1/4 in)
- Maximum speed: 230.2 km/h (143.0 mph)
- Weight: 20.3 t (20.0 long tons; 22.4 short tons)
- Prime mover: BMW VI
- Engine type: Water-cooled V12 petrol aircraft engine
- Cylinder count: 12
- Cylinder size: right bank: 160 mm × 190 mm (6.30 in × 7.48 in); left bank: 160 mm × 199 mm (6.30 in × 7.83 in)
- Power output: 600 hp (450 kW)
- Transmission: Compressed air (driving a propeller)
- UIC classification: 2
- Track gauge: 1,435 mm (4 ft 8 1/2 in) standard gauge

The Schienenzeppelin (German: [ˈʃiːnənˌtsɛpəliːn]) or rail zeppelin was a one-off experimental railcar which resembled a Zeppelin airship in appearance. It was designed and developed by the German aircraft engineer Franz Kruckenberg in 1929. Propulsion was by means of a pusher propeller located at the rear: it accelerated the railcar to 230.2 km/h (143 mph) setting the land speed record for a petrol powered rail vehicle. Only a single example was ever built, which due to safety concerns remained out of service and was finally dismantled in 1939.

== History ==
Anticipating the design of the Schienenzeppelin, the earlier Aerowagon, an experimental Russian high-speed railcar, was also equipped with an aircraft engine and a propeller.

The railcar was built at the beginning of 1930 in the Hannover-Leinhausen works of the German Railway Company (Deutsche Reichsbahn). The work was completed by autumn of the same year. The vehicle was 25.85 metres (84 ft 9 3/4 in) long and had just two axles, with a wheelbase of 19.6 metres (64 ft 3 5/8 in). The height was 2.8 metres (9 ft 2 1/4 in). As originally built it had two conjoined BMW IV 6-cylinder petrol aircraft engines (later a single BMW VI 12-cylinder of 600 horsepower (450 kW)) driving a four-bladed (later two-bladed), fixed pitch ash propeller. The driveshaft was raised seven-degrees above the horizontal to give the vehicle some downwards thrust. The body of the Schienenzeppelin was streamlined, having some resemblance to the era's popular Zeppelin airships, and it was built of aluminium in aircraft style to reduce weight. The railcar could carry up to 40 passengers; its interior was spartan and designed in Bauhaus-style.

On 10 May 1931, the Schienenzeppelin exceeded a speed of 200 km/h (120 mph) for the first time. Afterwards, it was exhibited to the general public throughout Germany. On 21 June 1931, it set a new world railway speed record of 230.2 km/h (143.0 mph) on the Berlin–Hamburg line between Karstädt and Dergenthin, which was not surpassed by any other rail vehicle until 1954. The railcar still holds the land speed record for a petrol powered rail vehicle. This high speed was attributable, amongst other things, to its low weight, which was only 20.3 tonnes (20.0 long tons; 22.4 short tons).

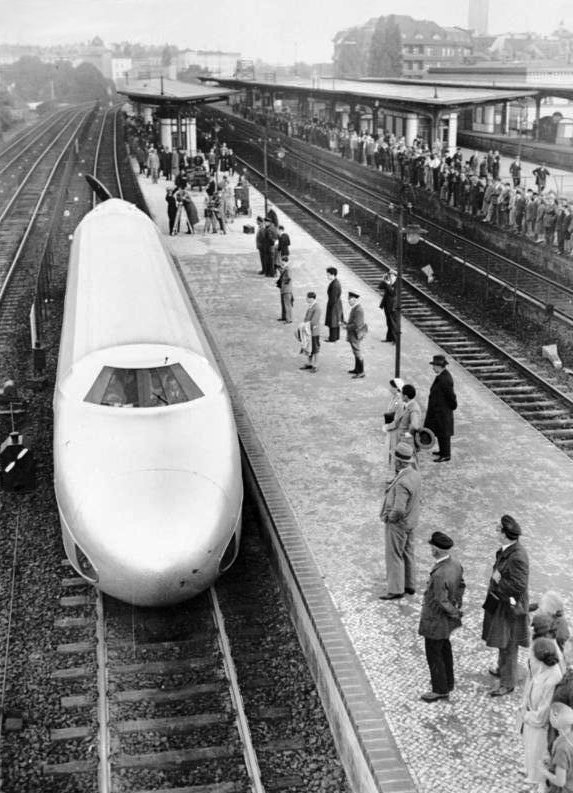
Front view of the Schienenzeppelin in its original form; at Berlin on the morning of the record-breaking run, 21 June 1931

In 1932 Kruckenberg began a new project with the rail car involving significant modifications. It was cut just behind the forward wheels and received a complete new front end with a two-axle bogie, resembling the later 137 155 railcar. The rear single axle remained as it was. The modifications were completed by November 1932. The aircraft engine was still used; however, the power transmission was hydraulic through two Föttinger fluid drives for both directions of travel, fitted on the forward bogie. A pointed fairing was installed in place of the propeller. The resulting vehicle was a B-1 with a powered front bogie. This version of the vehicle reached 180 km/h (110 mph) at the beginning of 1933.

Due to many problems with the Schienenzeppelin prototype, the Deutsche Reichsbahn-Gesellschaft decided to go their own way in developing a high-speed railcar, leading to the Diesel-powered Fliegender Hamburger (DRG Class SVT 877 Flying Hamburger) in 1933. This new design was suitable for regular service and served also as the basis for later railcar developments. However, many of the Kruckenberg ideas, based on the experiments with Schienenzeppelin and high-speed rail travel, found their way into later DRG railcar designs.

At the beginning of 1934 the Schienenzeppelin was rebuilt for the last time, and a Maybach GO 5 V12 diesel engine was installed. In July 1934 it was sold to Deutsche Reichsbahn (German Imperial Railway) for 10,000 Reichsmarks. Five years later, in 1939 the rail zeppelin was finally dismantled because its material was needed by the German army.

== Disadvantages ==
The failure of the Schienenzeppelin has been attributed to everything from the dangers of using an open propeller in crowded railway stations to fierce competition between Kruckenberg's company and the Deutsche Reichsbahn's separate efforts to build high-speed railcars.

One disadvantage of the rail zeppelin was the inherent difficulty of pulling additional wagons to form a train, because of its construction. Furthermore, the vehicle could not use its propeller to climb steep gradients, as the flow would separate when full power was applied. Thus an additional means of propulsion was needed for such circumstances.

Safety concerns have been associated with running high-speed railcars on old track network, with the inadvisability of reversing the vehicle, and with operating a propeller close to passengers.

== See also ==
- Aérotrain, a French hovercraft train using ducted fans and jet engines
- Aerowagon
- Bennie Railplane
