= DB Class VT 10.5 =

DB Class VT 10^{5}
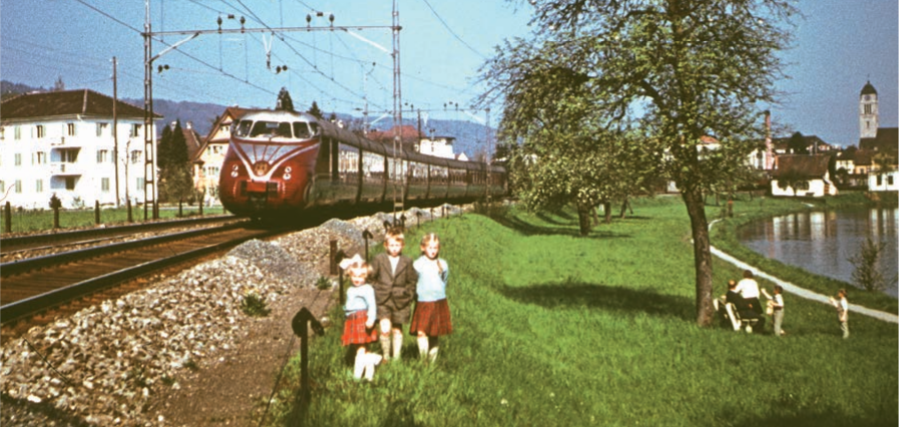
- VT10 551
- In service: 1953–1959/1960
- Manufacturer: 501: LHB; 551: Wegmann
- Constructed: 1953
- Number built: 2
- Fleet numbers: VT 10 501, VT 10 551

Specifications
- Train length: 501: 96,700 mm (317 ft 3 1/8 in); 551: 108,900 mm (357 ft 3 3/8 in)
- Width: 3,024 mm (9 ft 11 in)
- Height: 3,525 mm (11 ft 6 3/4 in)
- Maximum speed: Originally: 120 km/h (75 mph); Later: 160 km/h (99 mph)
- Weight: 501: 104.0 t (102.4 long tons; 114.6 short tons); 551: 122.0 t (120.1 long tons; 134.5 short tons)
- Axle load: 13.0 t (12.8 long tons; 14.3 short tons)
- Prime mover(s): MAN D 1548 G
- Engine type: diesel engine
- Power output: Originally: 4 × 120 kW (160 hp); Later: 4 × 150 kW (200 hp)
- Transmission: Torque converter and gearbox
- UIC classification: 501: B′1′1′1′1′1′1′B′; 551: B′2′2′2′2′2′2′2′B′
- Track gauge: 1,435 mm (4 ft 8 1/2 in)

The VT 10.5 was a diesel multiple unit that was developed by the Deutsche Bundesbahn in the early 1950s. It was first displayed in public at the International Transport Exhibition in Munich in 1953.

== Design and operation ==
Two train sets were built with significant differences in construction. The day train, "Senator" (VT 10 501), consisted of seven cars, including the front and rear engine unit. The cars were connected by single Jacobs axles. Only the first bogies of the power units were twin-axle bogies, both axles being powered. The "Senator" was on duty between Hamburg and Frankfurt/Main from May 1954 until November 1957.

The night train, "Komet" (VT 10 551), was different from the "Senator" though its shape looked similar at first sight. Its livery was notably different. Instead of single Jacobs axles connecting the cars, twin-axle Jacobs bogies were used. The "Komet" was delivered with 7 (2+5) cars from the outset and soon afterwards equipped with an additional dining car. All available online pictures show the Komet with 8 cars (2+6). In 1956, an additional car (conference car 551i) was built for the first foreign journey by a German President after the Second World War. Due to the train's limited power, another car had to be taken out of the train in order to accommodate car 551i. The conference car is the only surviving unit. "Komet" had better driving characteristics than "Senator", which was described as behaving a bit like a goods wagon.

"Komet" was in service between Zürich and Hamburg from May 1954 until December 1960 and was operated by the DSG (Deutsche Schlafwagen Gesellschaft/German sleeping car company).

== Technical data ==
The VT 10 501 was built by Linke-Hofmann-Busch in 1953 for the Deutsche Bundesbahn. It was designed as a seven-unit train. Every pair of intermediate cars had a common Jacobs axle; only the power cars had twin-axled, powered bogies.

The VT 10 551 built in 1953 for the Deutsche Schlafwagen- und Speisewagengesellschaft by Wegmann in Kassel and taken over on 1 January 1955 by the Deutsche Bundesbahn. The trailer cars were linked by twin-axled Jacobs bogies; the power cars had twin-axled, powered bogies.

Each power car was equipped with two MAN diesel engines of Type D 1548 G, each developing 118 kW (158 hp). Later, the power was increased to 154 kW (207 hp) per engine. The original version had a top speed of 120 km/h (75 mph); the later version could attain 160 km/h (99 mph) this speed was never used in the time table. To supply power to the train, two additional diesel engines were installed, each capable of 92 kW (123 hp). Power transmission was hydraulic with a mechanical four-way gearbox.

== Gallery ==
Details of the VT 10 551i

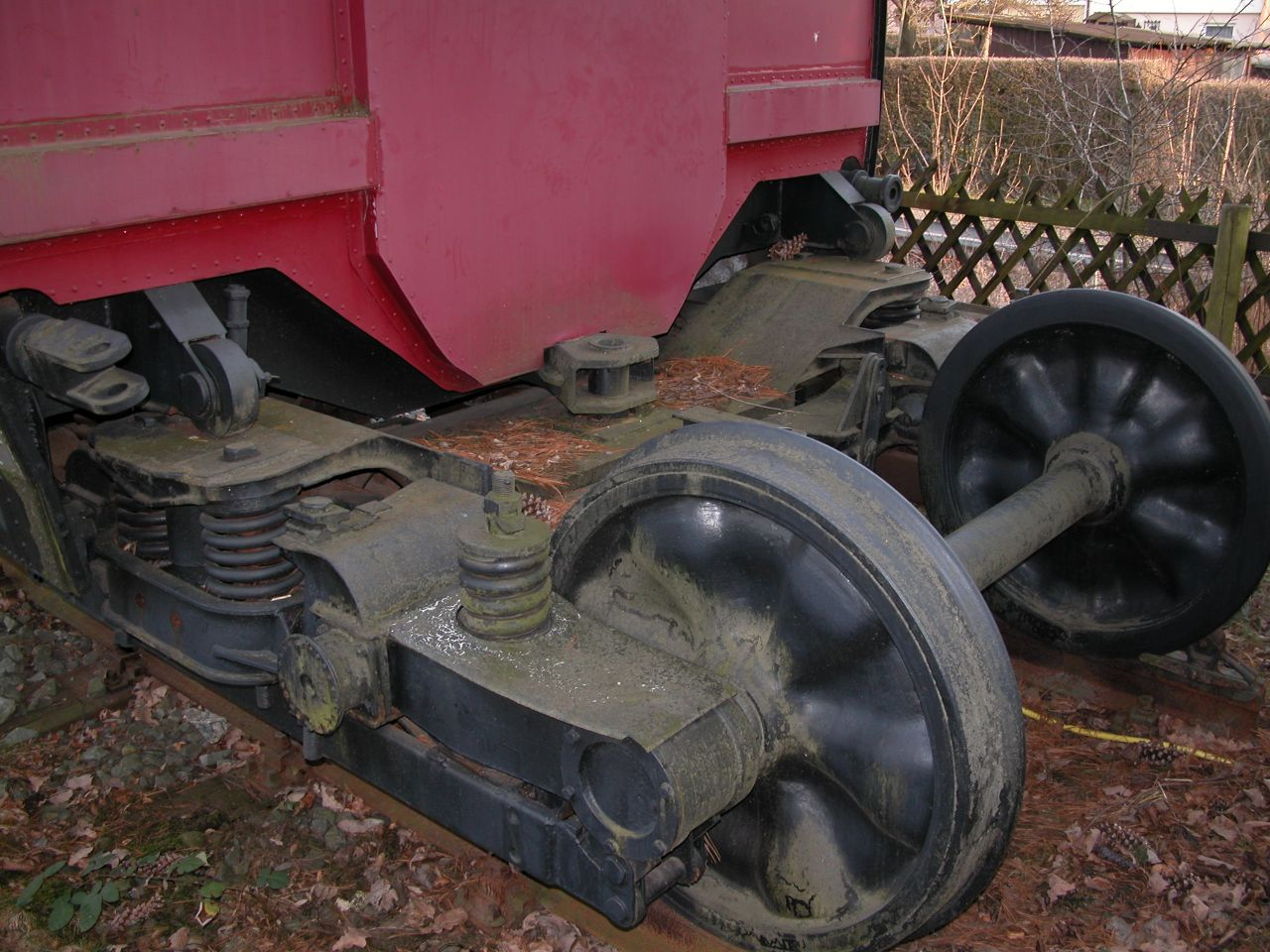

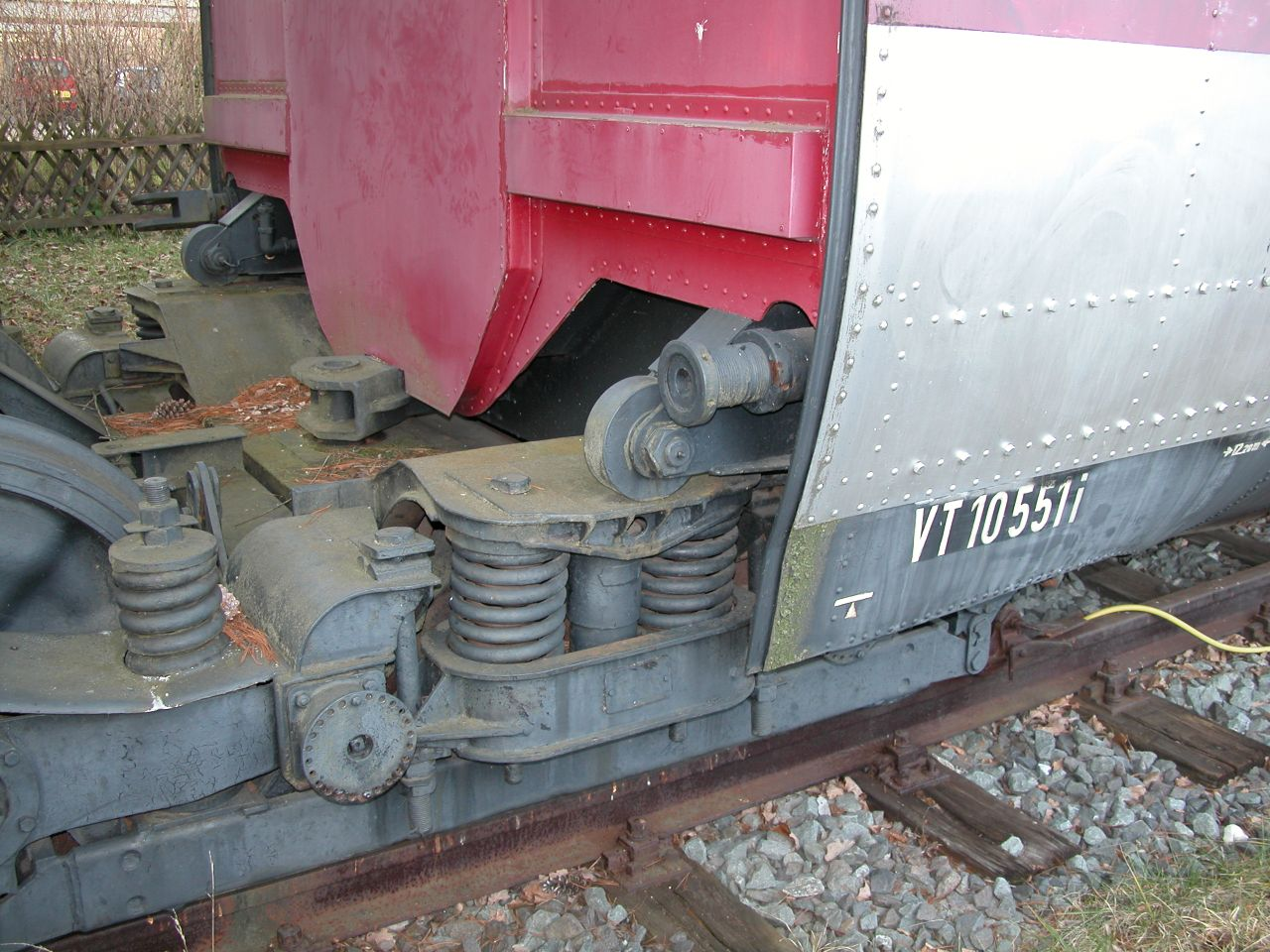

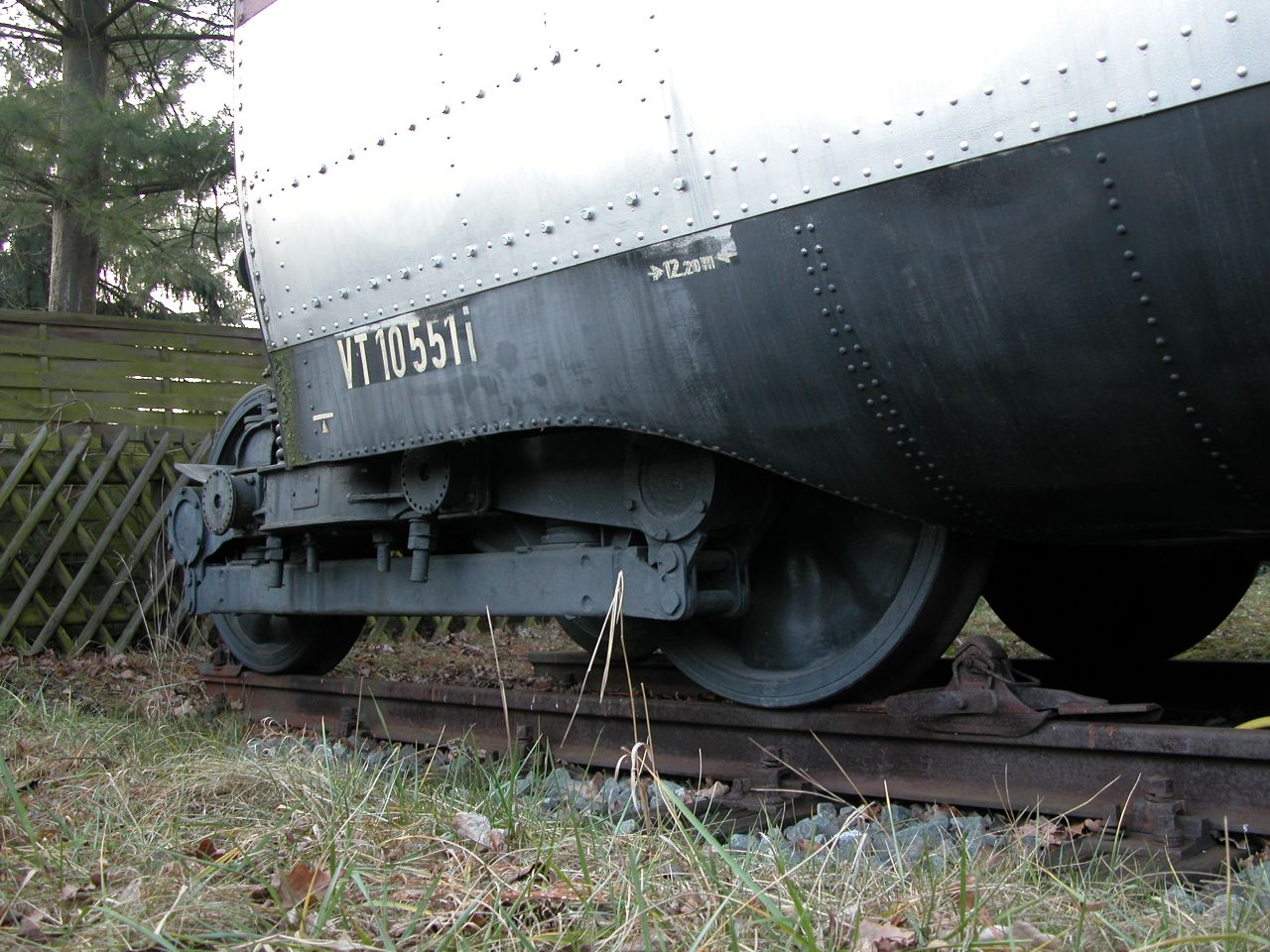

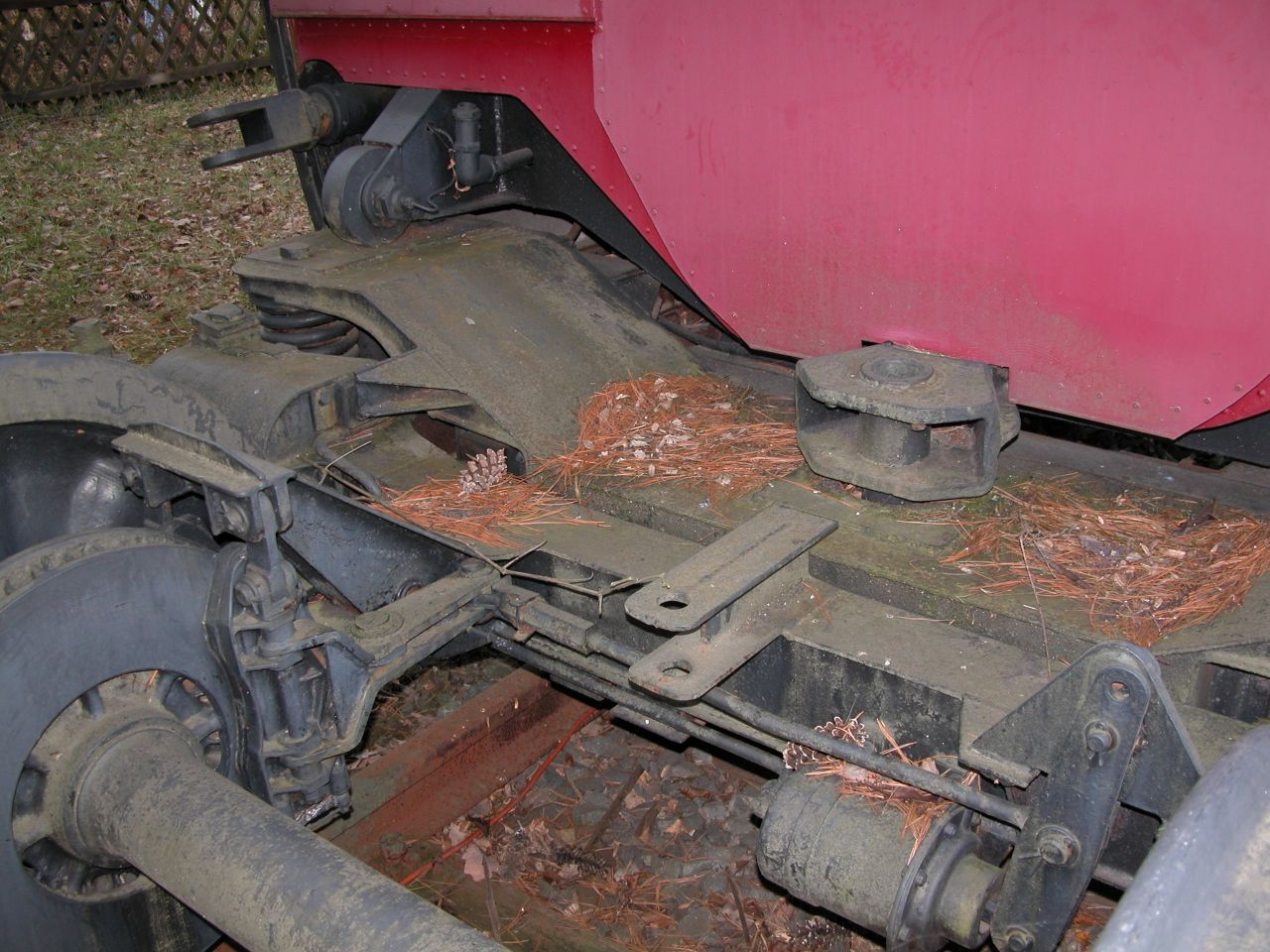
