= Bassinthegrass =

Music festival held in Darwin, Australia

Coordinates: 12°26′49″S 130°50′13″E

BASSINTHEGRASS
- Genre: Rock, Hip hop, Electronic, Indie
- Dates: mid-to-late May
- Locations: Darwin, Northern Territory, Australia
- Years active: 2003 - present
- Founders: Northern Territory Government
- Website: http://bassinthegrass.com.au

Bassinthegrass (styled as BASSINTHEGRASS) is an Australian music festival. It is the largest music festival in the Northern Territory, and has been held annually since 2003 in the territory capital. The festival is operated by the Northern Territory Government through the Northern Territory Major Events Company, part of a project of the previous Martin government to bring prominent bands to the territory and showcase local talent. BASSINTHEGRASS has grown rapidly since its inception, resulting in the imposition of cap on ticket numbers in 2007. A sister festival, Bassinthedust, had been held in Alice Springs commencing in 2004, but was shelved in 2008.

== History ==
Established in 2003, BASSINTHEGRASS is the Northern Territory's biggest and longest-running music festival.

The festival was first held in 2003 to fulfill a campaign promise by the government to hold a Big Day Out-style youth concert in the territory. It was held in both Darwin and Alice Springs in its inaugural year, with the Alice Springs leg later becoming the Bassinthedust festival. 5000 people attended the Darwin leg, with a further 1500 in Alice Springs, listening to headline acts The Living End, 30 Odd Foot of Grunts, and NoKTuRNL. It became an annual event.

It became a Darwin-only festival in 2004 with the creation of Bassinthedust, and a crowd of 6000 turned out to a hear a larger lineup. Radio personality Jackie O had been meant to MC the event, but arrived nine hours late, and stormed off stage after being booed by the crowd and played over by Frenzal Rhomb in an incident that received national media coverage. You Am I, Little Birdy, Evermore, Regurgitator and Anthony Callea headlined the festival in 2005.

The festival switched to a two-stage format in 2006. BASS is a Darwin rite of passage, and in its 18 years has seen some of the country's biggest acts perform to sold-out crowds. In 2019, the festival moved to a bigger, new seaside location at Mindil Beach (famous for its sunsets) and hasn't looked back since. The 2019 event sold out at 10,000 tickets.

== Artist lineup by year ==
=== 2003 ===
- Cinco Loco
- Culture Connect
- Endorphin
- Leon Spurling
- The Living End
- Llypente Apurte
- Machine Gun Fellatio
- NoKTuRNL
- One Dollar Short
- Plan B
- Public Holdup
- Selwyn
- Shellie Morris
- Sophie Monk
- Three on a Tree
- 28 Days
- 30 Odd Foot of Grunts

=== 2004 ===
- Grinspoon
- Frenzal Rhomb
- The Dissociatives
- The Superjesus
- Jebediah
- Human Nature
- Shannon Noll
- Roymackonkey
- Even
- Hairy Lemon
- Sophie Koh
- World Fly
- Lifted Mace
- Elysium
- Plonker

=== 2005 ===
- Anthony Callea
- Black Chapel
- Evermore
- Little Birdy
- Regurgitator
- You Am I
- The Flairz
- Nabarlek
- Pop Fantastic
- The Spazzys
- Storm Riders
- Test Theory
- Thirsty Merc
- Vanessa Amorosi
- Vassy

=== 2006 ===
- Stokes Hill
- Neo
- Zenith ASP
- Flesh Petal
- 28 Days
- Gerling
- Faker
- Lee Harding
- Worldfly
- The Herd
- Something for Kate
- Pete Murray
- Hilltop Hoods
- The Living End

=== 2007 ===
- Behind Crimson Eyes
- Enth Degree
- Eskimo Joe
- Hilltop Hoods
- Jet
- Little Birdy
- Lowrider
- Mammal
- The Moxie
- Shannon Noll
- The Strikes
- TZU
- The Weathermen
- Young Divas

=== 2008 ===
- Powderfinger
- Hilltop Hoods
- The Potbelleez
- Wolfmother
- Gyroscope
- Mammal
- The Audreys
- Hercules of NY
- Front House
- Roymackonkey
- The Moving Targets
- Terracotta Pigeons

=== 2009 ===
- Augie March
- The Aviators
- Bliss n Eso
- The Cat Empire
- Enth Degree
- Gabriella Climi
- The Living End
- Push Crew
- Seany B / Matt Roberts
- Sneaky Sound System
- Unbroken Expanse

=== 2010 ===
- Silverchair (Note: This was Silverchair's final live performance before their disbandment in 2011.)
- Hilltop Hoods
- Empire of the Sun
- Jessica Mauboy
- Children Collide
- Short Stack
- Horrorshow
- Redcoats
- Sleeveheads (Battle of the School Bands Winner)
- DJ Fish
- Sweet Amber
- Semishigure
- Leigh Chisholm

=== 2011 ===
- The Presets
- Sneaky Sound System
- Birds of Tokyo
- Art Vs Science
- British India
- The Potbelleez
- Dead Letter Circus
- Hayley Warner
- Justice Crew
- DT3
- Unbroken Expanse
- Ned & Friends

=== 2012 ===
- The Temper Trap
- Hilltop Hoods
- Boy & Bear
- The Jezabels
- Reece Mastin
- Drapht
- 360
- Stonefield
- Calling All Cars
- Redcoats
- Emma Rowe and the Two Other Guys
- Skarlett
- N.E.A.L Boys
- Elcah Rane

=== 2013 ===
- 360
- Matt Corby
- Flume
- Grinspoon
- The Amity Affliction
- Illy
- Hermitude
- Amy Meredith
- Kingswood
- Chasin Aces
- My Team Dilemma
- Rambutan Jam Band
- Joshua Goodrem

=== 2014 ===
- The Amity Affliction
- Pendulum DJ Set
- The Living End
- Rufus
- Vance Joy
- Peking Duk
- Justice Crew
- OK Kaleidoscope
- Michael Lindsey
- Allday
- Jackie Onasis
- Owl Eyes
- Bear Essence
- Skank MC

=== 2015 ===
- Birds of Tokyo
- Champagne with Mary Jane
- Flight Facilities
- Hilltop Hoods
- Illy
- Jarred & Prayer
- Kid Mac
- Kingswood
- The Preatures
- Roymackonkey
- Sheppard
- Tha Trigger
- Thundamentals

=== 2016 ===
- Angus & Julia Stone
- Bliss N Eso
- Boy & Bear
- Drapht
- Hermitude
- Rüfüs
- Safia
- Tkay Maidza
- Violent Soho
- Gaia
- Tapestry
- At The Dakota

=== 2017 ===
- Amy Shark
- BOO SEEKA
- John Butler Trio
- L D R U
- Peking Duk
- The Rubens
- Tash Sultana
- Thundamentals
- The Veronicas
- Stevie Jean
- Rachel Rachel
- Fat Pigeon
- Resin Moon

=== 2018 ===
- Client Liaison
- Confidence Man
- Dean Lewis
- Dune Rats
- Illy
- Paul Kelly
- San Cisco
- Spit Syndicate
- Vera Blue

=== 2019 ===
- Allday
- Amy Shark
- Ball Park Music
- Broods
- Caiti Baker
- DZ Deathrays
- Hermitude
- Hilltop Hoods
- Hot Dub Time Machine
- Karnivool
- The Lunar Society
- Mallrat
- Meg Mac
- Chet Faker
- PNAU
- Ruel
- SIX60
- Tasman Keith
- Tapestry
- Kyle Maher
- Open Scars

=== 2020 ===
- Festival postponed to 2021 due to COVID-19

=== 2021 ===
- Boo Seeka
- Chillinit
- DMA's
- G Flip
- Hayden James
- Illy
- Jack River
- Lime Cordiale
- Missy Higgins
- Ocean Alley
- Peking Duk
- SAFIA
- The Jungle Giants
- The Rubens
- Thelma Plum
- Violent Soho
- Draftday
- Scrubfowl
- Big T and S Evans
- Marlon featuring Rulla
- Casii Williams

=== 2022 ===
- Boy & Bear
- Dope Lemon
- Dune Rats
- G Flip
- Hilltop Hoods
- Hockey Dad
- Hooligan Hefs
- Hot Dub Time Machine
- Jessica Mauboy
- J-Milla
- Mako Road
- MSON (Making Something Outta Nothing)
- Montaigne
- Peking Duk
- Phoebe Olivia
- The Dreggs
- The Teskey Brothers
- Vera Blue
- Xavier Rudd

=== 2023 ===
- Amy Shark
- Angus & Julia Stone
- Babe Rainbow
- Baker Boy
- Guy Sebastian
- Hooligan Hefs
- Jack Botts Music
- LDRU
- MAY-A
- Ocean Alley
- Peach PRC
- The Presets
- San Cisco
- Spacey Jane
- Steph Strings
- Tones & I

=== 2024 ===
- Bag Raiders
- Bliss n Eso
- Elephant Town
- Mr Chrisy Mertas
- Coterie
- Jet
- The Jungle Giants
- King Stingray
- Lotte Gallagher
- Macklemore (Note: Macklemore is the first-ever Bassinthegrass headline act from overseas.)
- Middle Kids
- Northlane
- What So Not
- Ziggy Alberts

=== 2025 ===
- The Amity Affliction
- Baby J
- Cyril (DJ)
- Crystal Robins & The Wildfires
- The Dreggs
- Hilltop Hoods
- Hot Dub Time Machine
- Jacksen
- Jaded
- Jax Jones
- Jazmine Nikitta
- The Jungle Giants
- Kah-Lo
- Latifa Tee
- Luude
- Meg Mac
- Old Mervs
- The Rions
- Yola Dewi
- 3%

=== 2026 ===
- Anna Lunoe
- AYYBO
- Ball Park Music
- Denzel Curry
- Galantis
- G Flip
- In Hearts Wake
- JessB
- Kita Alexander
- Kobie Dee
- The Living End
- Mallrat
- Maple's Pet Dinosaur
- Morty
- Ninajirachi
- Nina Las Vegas
- Oktae
- Peking Duk
- Playlunch
- Tang
- Teen Jesus and the Jean Teasers
- The Teskey Brothers
- Venjent
