= Hamburg U-Bahn Type DT1 =

German U-Bahn train type formerly operated in Hamburg

HHA-Baureihe DT1
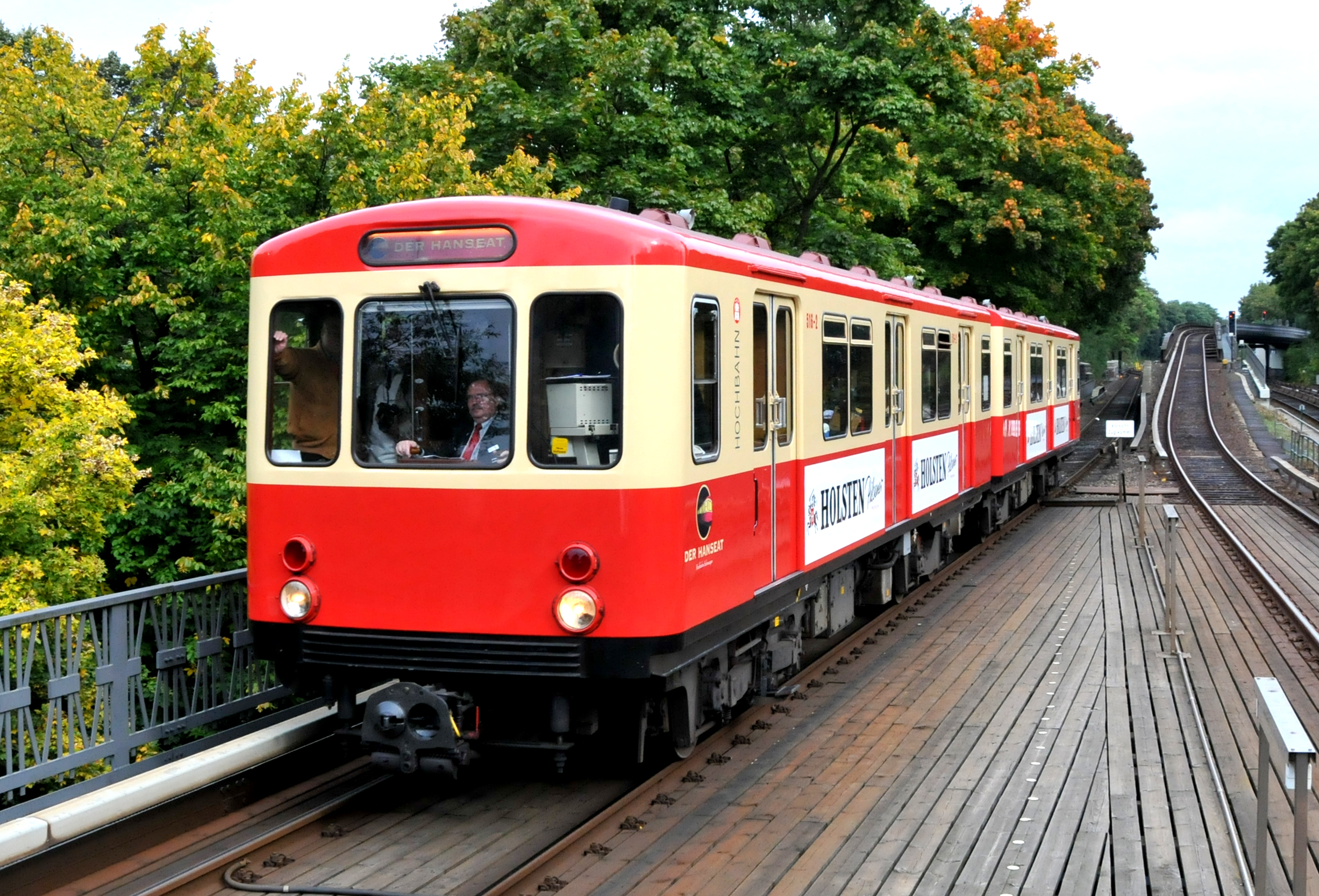
- DT1 heritage train in October 2012
- In service: 1958–1991
- Manufacturer: Waggonfabrik Uerdingen
- Constructed: 1958/1959
- Scrapped: 1991
- Number built: 50 units
- Number preserved: 3 units
- Number scrapped: 47 units
- Fleet numbers: 9431/9432–9529/9530 (originally); 9000/9001–9098/9099 (since 1960); 501–544 (since the 1980s)
- Capacity: 276 (80 seated)
- Operators: Hamburger Hochbahn AG
- Depots: Barmbek

Specifications
- Car body construction: Steel
- Train length: 28.43 m (93 ft 3 in)
- Width: 2.55 m (8 ft 4 in)
- Height: 3.37 m (11 ft 1 in)
- Doors: 3 pairs per side (per car)
- Maximum speed: 80 km/h (50 mph)
- Weight: 50.5 t (49.7 long tons; 55.7 short tons)
- Power output: 592 kW (790 hp)
- Acceleration: 1,14 m/s²
- Deceleration: 1,19 m/s²
- Electric system(s): 750 V DC third rail
- Current collection: Contact shoe
- UIC classification: Bo'Bo' + Bo'Bo'
- Braking system(s): Dynamic main brakes
- Safety system(s): Sifa
- Coupling system: Scharfenberg
- Track gauge: 1,435 mm (4 ft 8 1/2 in)

The Type DT1 is a two-car electric multiple unit (EMU) train type operated by the Hamburger Hochbahn AG (HHA) on the Hamburg U-Bahn until 1991. They were the first new U-Bahn trains since the 1930s.

== Technical specifications ==
The units were formed as two-car sets. The car bodies are made out of welded steel. Each bogie is fitted with two axle-hung motors.

== Interior ==
The first units were fitted with transverse seating. Subsequent units were fitted with a mix of longitudinal and transverse seats. Each car has three 2-leaf-doors on each side.

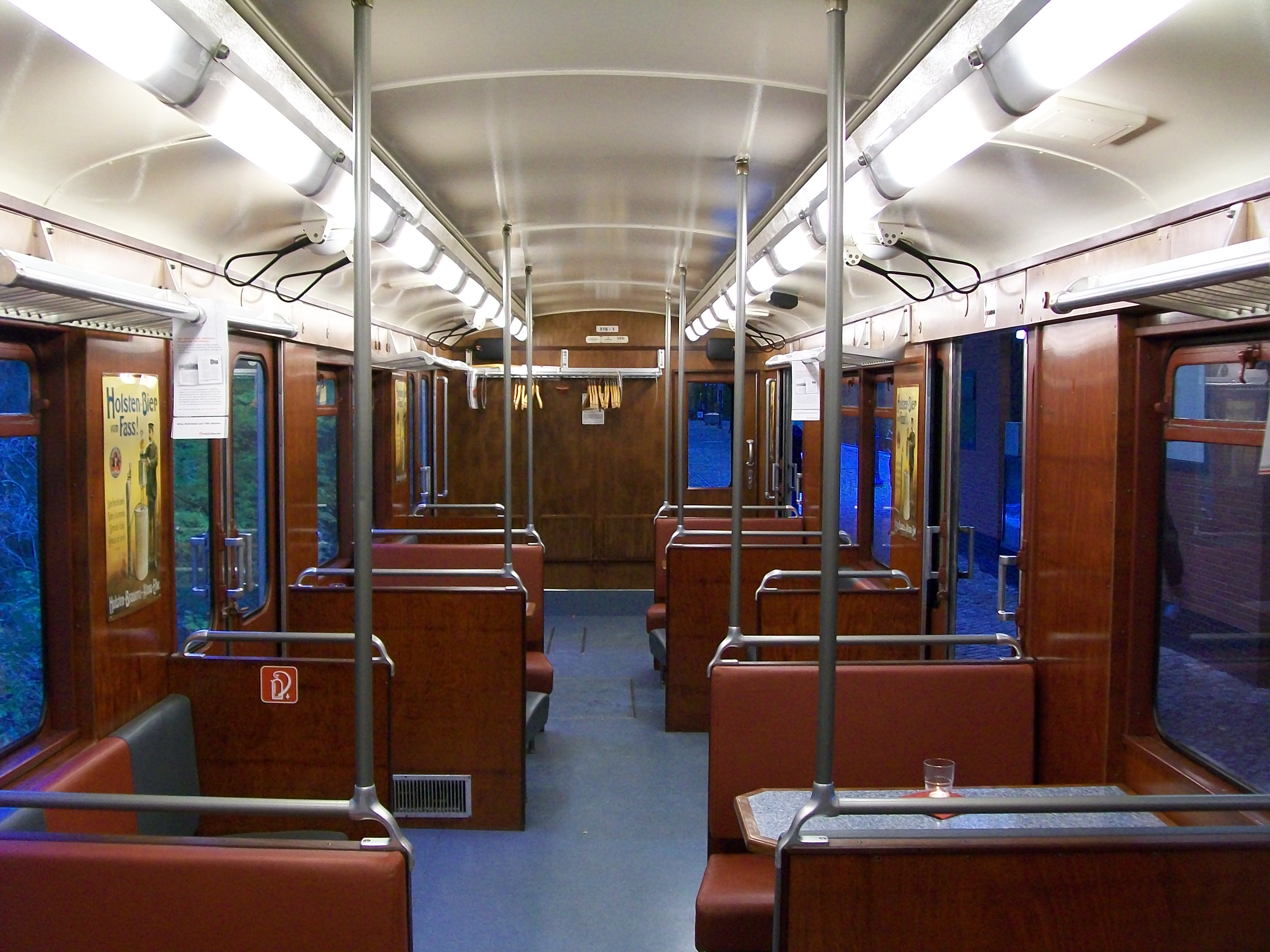
Interior of the DT1 heritage train

== History ==
The trains were originally numbered 9431/9432 to 9529/9530, and were renumbered to 9000/9001 to 9098/9099 in 1960. Their livery was changed between 1969 and 1971 to unify the look of the Hochbahn trains, with the DT1 trains receiving a 2-tone grey livery with orangered doors and cab ends, similar to the Type DT2 and Type DT3. DT1 trains were restricted to peak-hour services since 1971. The sets still in service in the 1980s were renumbered to 501 to 544. Withdrawals began in 1987 and were finished in 1991.

== Preserved examples ==
Set 516 was rebuilt into the Hanseat party train in 1997 to 2000. The rebuilding included retrofitting of a bar and toilet into one car, and the restoration of the other car into its original state. A gangway connection was also installed, and the train was reliveried into its original red/cream livery scheme, as well as renumbered to its original number 9030/9031.
