= Bassinthedust =

Australian music festival

BassintheDust
- Genre: Rock, Hip hop, Electronic, Indie, Heavy metal
- Dates: September/October
- Locations: Alice Springs, Northern Territory, Australia
- Years active: 2004 – present
- Founders: Northern Territory Government
- Website: http://bassinthedust.com.au

Bassinthedust is an Australian music festival. It is the second largest music festival in the Northern Territory, and has been held annually since 2004 in Alice Springs. The festival is an offshoot of Bassinthegrass and is operated by the Northern Territory Government through the Northern Territory Major Events Company, part of a project of the previous Martin government to bring prominent bands to the territory and showcase local talent. Bassinthedust has grown rapidly since its inception. It is a sister festival of Bassinthegrass, replacing an Alice Springs leg of Bassinthegrass which had been held at the first festival in 2003.

== History ==
Bassinthegrass was first held in 2003, to fulfill a campaign promise by the Martin government to hold a Big Day Out-style youth concert in the territory. It was held in both Darwin and Alice Springs in its inaugural year, with the Alice Springs leg later becoming the Bassinthedust festival. 5000 people attended the Darwin leg, with a further 1500 in Alice Springs, listening to headline acts The Living End, 30 Odd Foot of Grunts, and NoKTuRNL. It was widely hailed as a success in the territory media, and became an annual event.

The Alice-only Bassinthedust festival was first held in 2004 at the Memo Club on 11 September 2004 to an audience of around 1200. The 2005 festival, featuring Spiderbait, Frenzal Rhomb, The Flairz, Screaming Jets, and Dallas Crane, was held at Anzac Oval (where all but the first festival have been held) on Saturday 10 September. The 2006 festival, featuring End of Fashion, Pete Murray and The Living End, was held on Saturday 23 September with an audience of around 2300. Hilltop Hoods were meant to play but were unable to make it to Alice Springs for the show. They later put on a show to make up for missing the festival. Jet headlined the 2007 festival on Saturday 22 September.

Bassinthedust 2008 will be held on 4 October at Anzac Oval.

== Artist line-up by year ==
=== 2008 ===
- Paul Kelly
- Jebediah
- The Getaway Plan
- Bliss n Eso
- Kid Kenobi and MC Shureshock
- Local NT Acts:
- Miazma
- Unbroken Expanse
- Glasgow Smile

=== 2007 ===
- Jet
- The Waifs
- TZU
- Lowrider
- Behind Crimson Eyes
- Mammal
- Exit Earth
- Bloom
- Tara Stewart
- Nights Plague
- Through Bullets and Bravery

=== 2006 ===
- End of Fashion
- Pete Murray
- The Living End
- Blistered
- Nights Plague
- Sweet Surrender
- Zenith ASP
- The Moxie
- Eternal Crusaders

=== 2005 ===
- Spiderbait
- Frenzal Rhomb
- The Flairz
- Screaming Jets
- Dallas Crane
- Letterstick Band
- Tashka Urban
- Exit Earth
- Zenith ASP
- Robotik Coq
- Teknikal Onslaught
- Super Raelene Bros
- Wild Weekend's Samah n Grab
- RnB $elebrity DJ Lenno and MC Jaz

=== 2004 ===
- The Superjesus
- Hilltop Hoods
- Christine Anu
- Resin Dogs
- TZU
- C-Kalibration
- Tecoma
- Blacktide
- Cinco Locos
