= DT2 =

DT2 may refer to:

- Dead Trigger 2, a video game
- HHA Type DT2, a two-car electric multiple unit train
- Donald Trump Jr., son of Donald Trump
- Cashew MRT station, a Singaporean MRT station
