= Hamburg U-Bahn Type DT3 =

German U-Bahn train type operated in Hamburg

HHA-Baureihe DT3
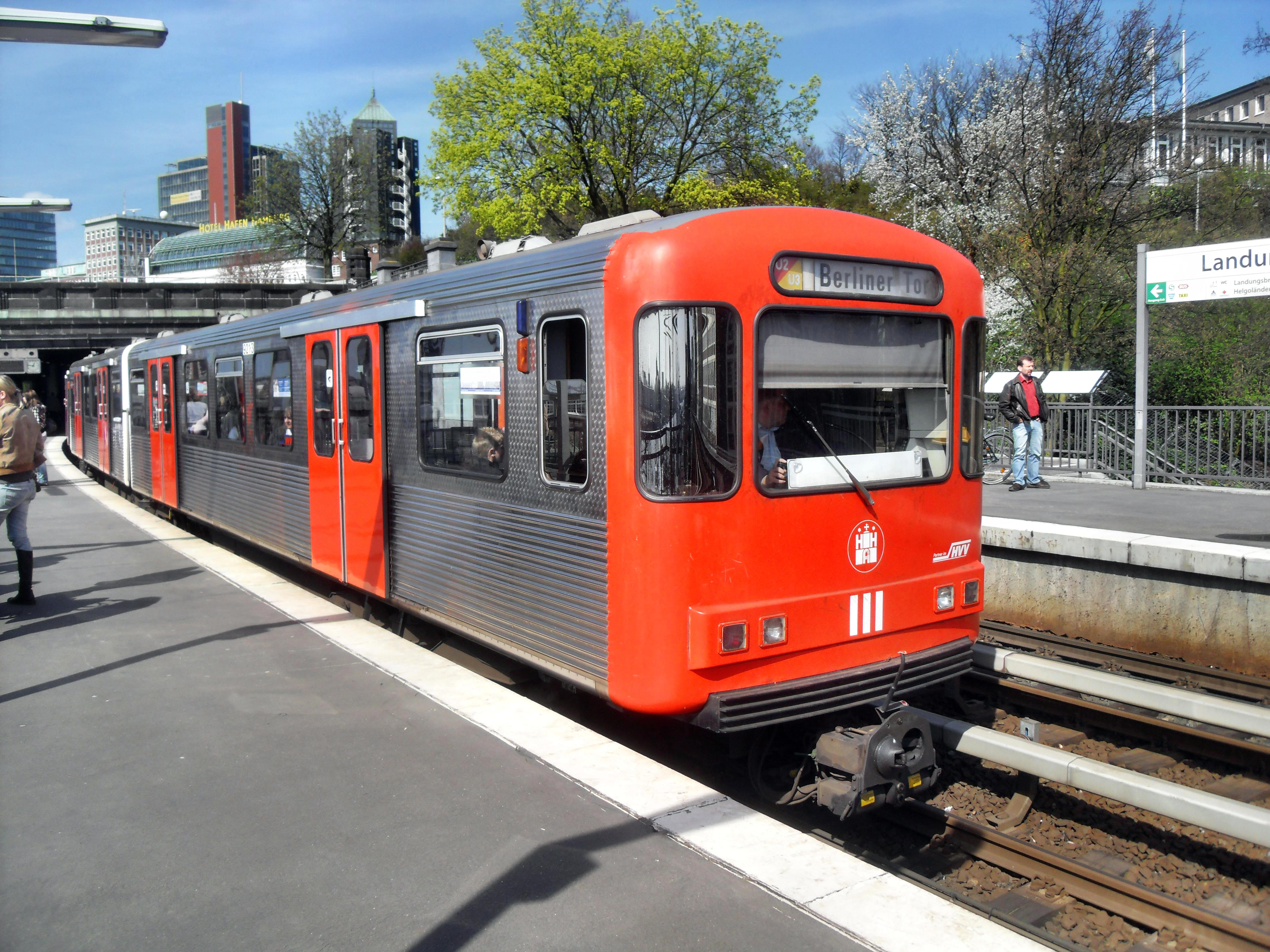
- A DT3-LZB train at Landungsbrücken station in April 2009
- In service: 1968 – 2023
- Manufacturers: LHB, BBC, Kiepe
- Constructed: 1966 (prototype); 1968–1971
- Entered service: 1968-2023
- Refurbished: 1994–2001, 2016
- Scrapped: 1999–2003, 2017, 2021, 2024
- Number built: 127 units
- Number in service: 0 units
- Number preserved: 2 units
- Number scrapped: 125 units
- Fleet numbers: originally: 9603–9983 later: 801–926, 931, 932
- Capacity: 364 (92 seated) (DT3); 90 seated (DT3-LZB)
- Operator: Hamburger Hochbahn AG
- Depots: Farmsen, Barmbek

Specifications
- Train length: 39.52 m (129 ft 8 in)
- Width: 2.48 m (8 ft 2 in)
- Height: 3.35 m (11 ft 0 in)
- Doors: 2 pairs per side (per car)
- Maximum speed: 80 km/h (50 mph)
- Weight: 47.1 t (46.4 long tons; 51.9 short tons)
- Power output: 640 kW (860 hp)
- Acceleration: 1.2 m/s²
- Deceleration: 1.2 m/s² (emergency)
- Electric system: 750 V DC third rail
- Current collection: Contact shoe
- UIC classification: Bo'Bo'Bo'Bo'
- Braking systems: Dynamic main brakes, Westinghouse air brakes
- Safety systems: Sifa; LZB (sets 921–926)
- Coupling system: Scharfenberg
- Track gauge: 1,435 mm (4 ft 8 1/2 in)

The Type DT3 is a three-car electric multiple unit (EMU) train type operated by the Hamburger Hochbahn AG on the Hamburg U-Bahn.They were first introduced in 1968 to replace the 1911 to 1929-built Type T cars and to speed up the journey times on line U1.

== Variants ==
- DT3: non-refurbished sets, all withdrawn
- DT3-LZB: sets 921 to 926 fitted with Linienzugbeeinflussung (LZB) in 1980/1981
- DT3-E: trains refurbished from 1995 to 2000 with new polyester cabs
- DT3-N: ten refurbished sets used as spare cars
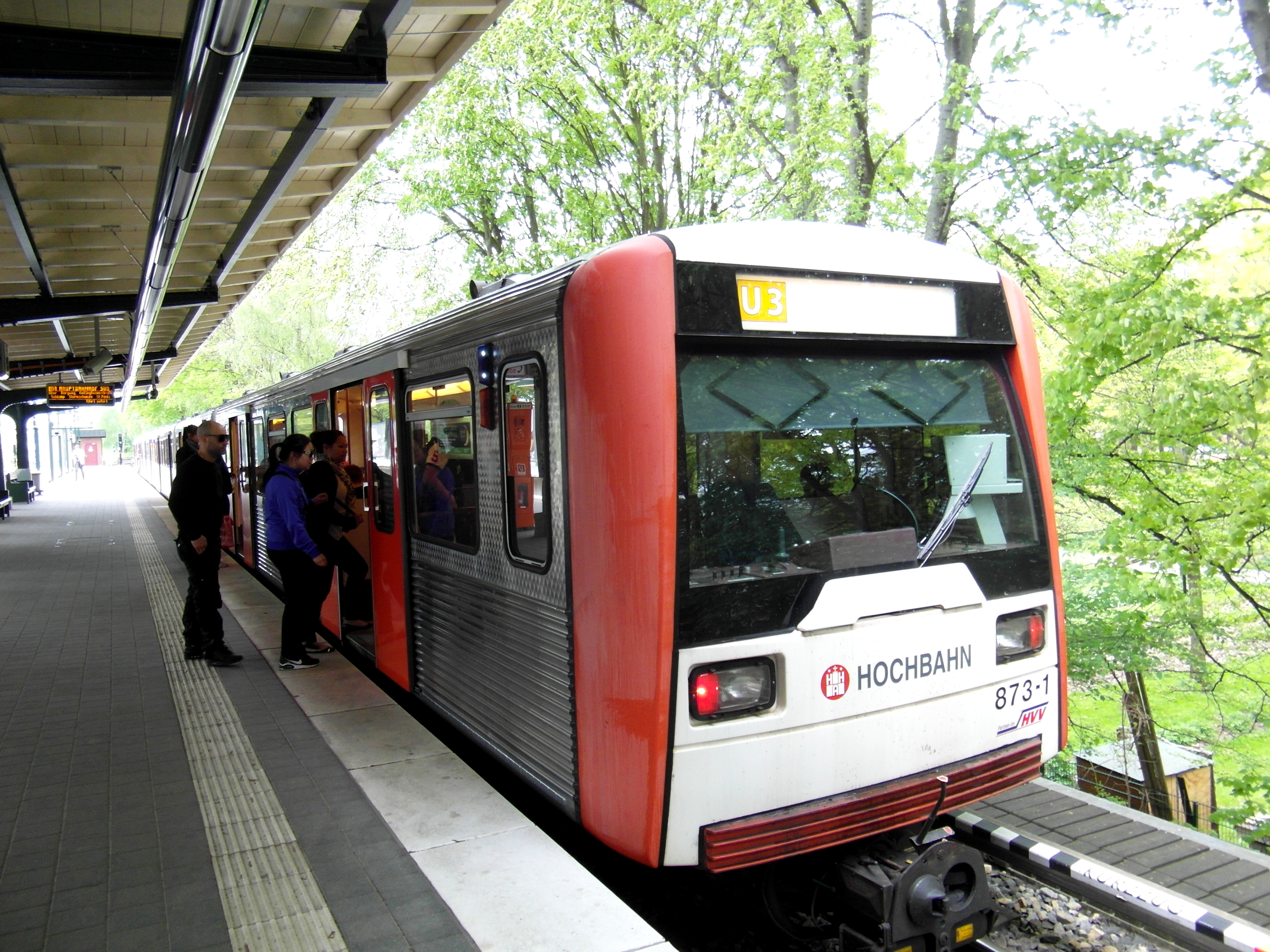
DT3-E with new polyester cab

== Interior ==
The trains have a 2+1 seating arrangement. Refurbished trains are equipped with a passenger information system since 2000.

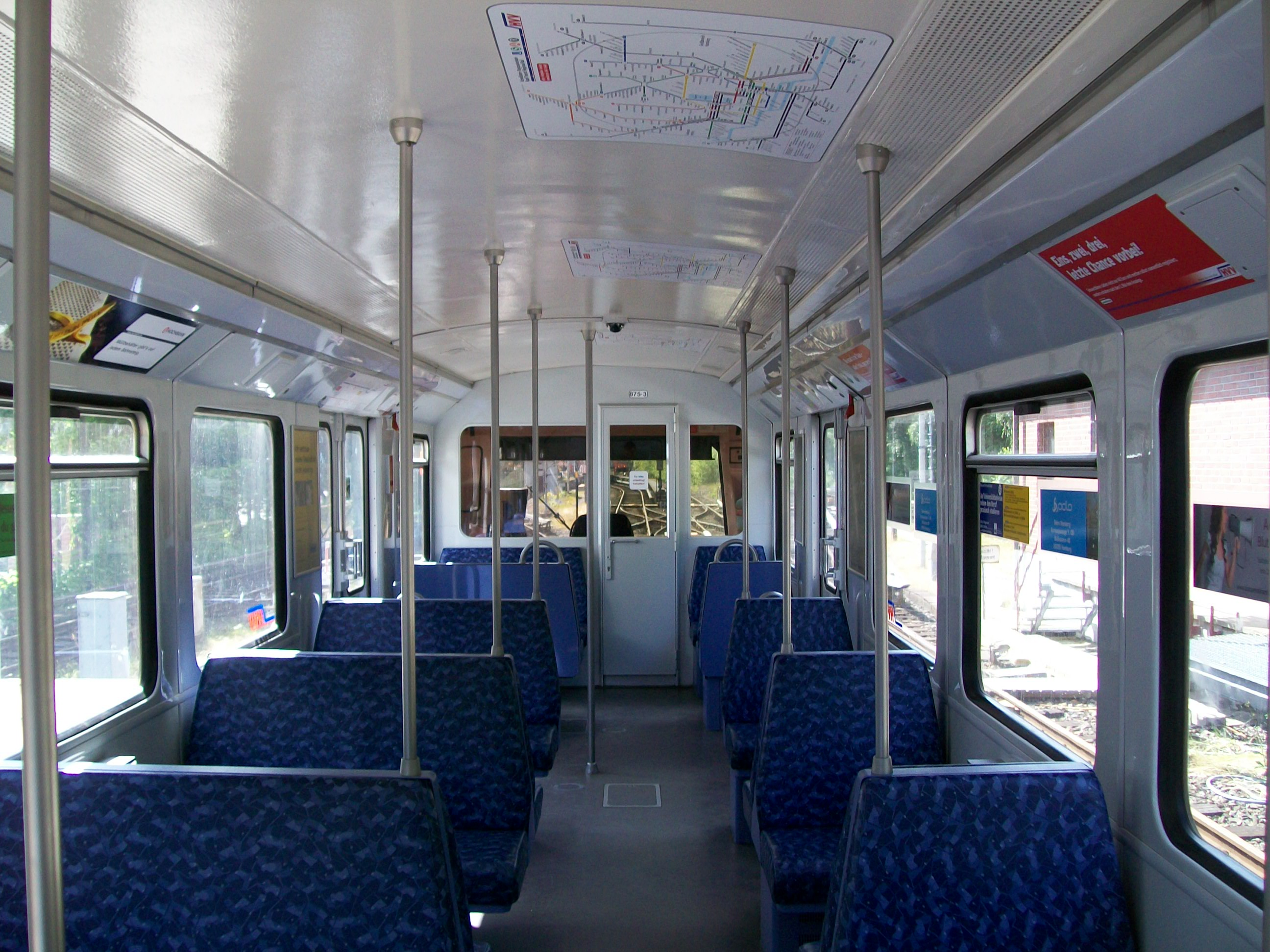
Interior of a refurbished DT3-E train

== Technical specifications ==
The trains are built to an articulated design, and are formed as three-car units. The end cars are based on the Type DT2, with a 10.72 m (35 ft 2 in) long intermediate car in-between. They are equipped with high voltage cam switches, quill drive, and a microprocessor-controlled wheel slide protection system.

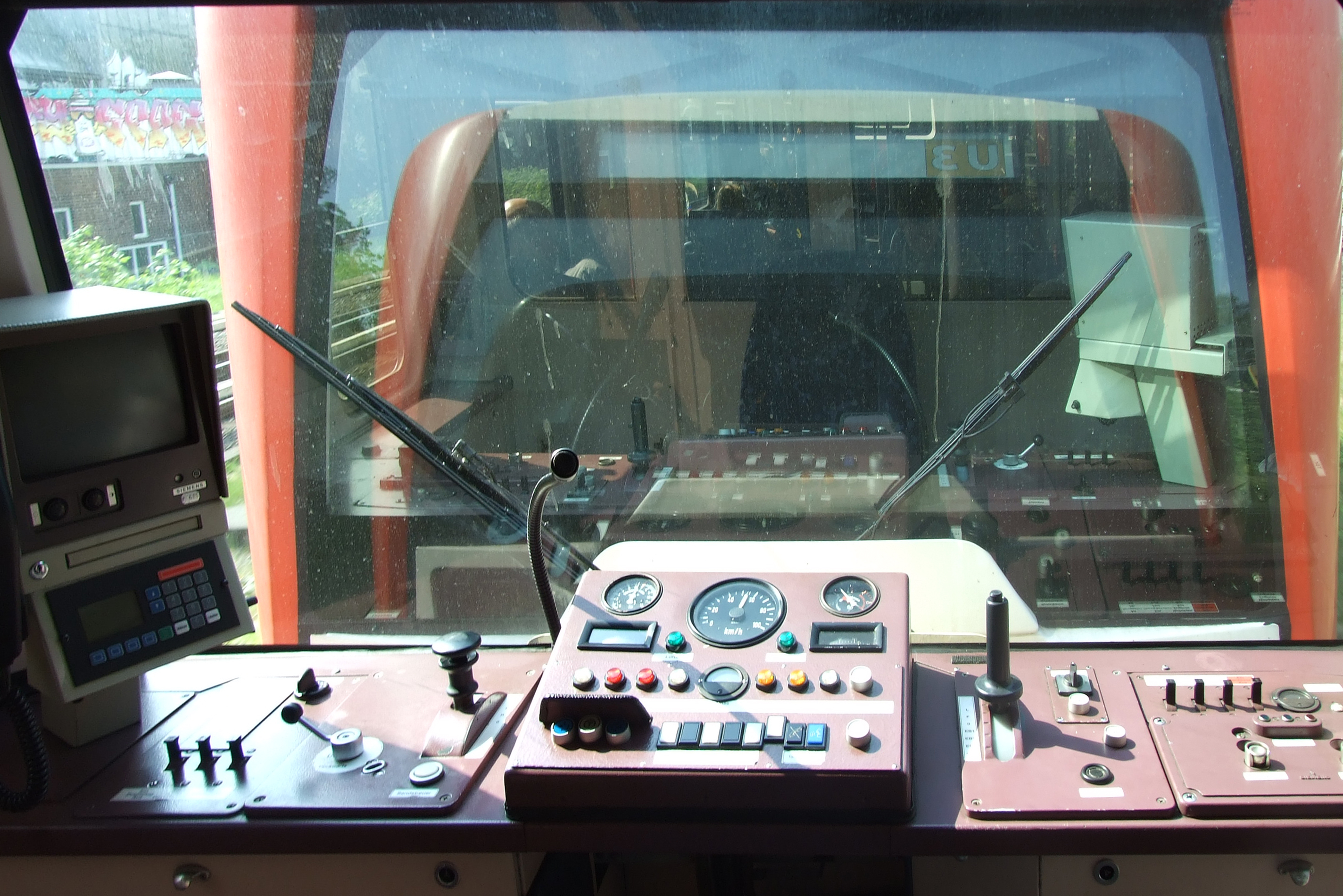
Driver's cab of a DT3

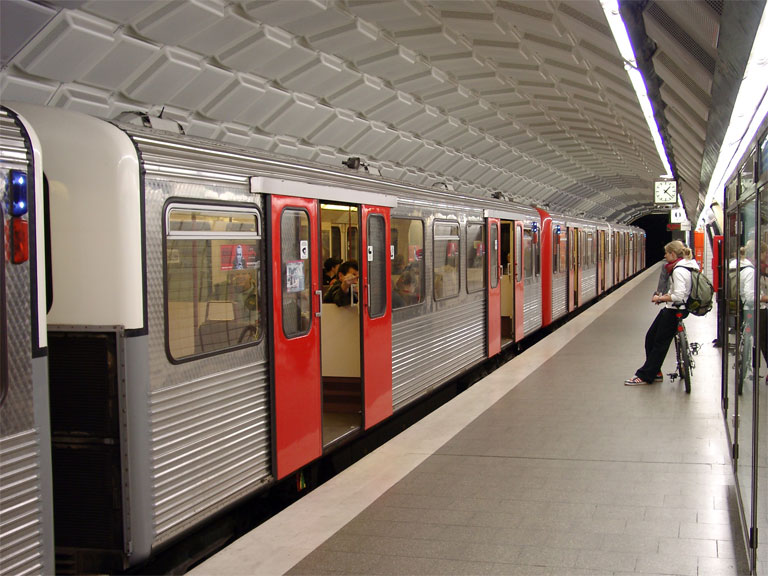
Side shot of a DT3 at Hauptbahnhof Nord station

=== DT3-LZB ===
Six sets were fitted with Linienzugbeeinflussung (LZB) in 1980 and 1981 and were used for driverless operation trials on the branch to Großhansdorf station. The automatic operation was observed by a conductor permanently sitting in the cab, they also had to dispatch the train in stations. The experimental operation ended in 1985, since then the units were in normal operation. During the refurbishment of many DT3 units in the 1990s, the DT3-LZB only received the interior and car body refurbishment and did not get their front replaced.

The LZB trains all were retired on 9 December 2016 and scrapped in April 2017.

== History ==
The trains were built between 1968 and 1971. 18 units were scrapped in 2017.

=== Refurbishment ===
Many of the units were rebuilt between 1995 and 2000 and received a newly designed polyester front ends, a new interior design, and windows between the cars and between the driver's cab and passenger compartment. The rebuilding became necessary due to structural issues with rust on load-bearing parts of the car bodies. The rebuilt units are designated as DT3-E. A total of 62 units were refurbished as of August 2005, the rest of the units were replaced by new DT4 units, retired and scrapped between 1996 and 2003.

In June 2015, the operator Hamburger Hochbahn announced another refurbishment for ten DT3-E units to extend their lifespan for ten more years. This refurbishment will include the replacement of the old control equipment, the fitting of door closing alarms, as well as the renewal of the interior and car bodies. The improvement was going to make the refurbished cars incompatible to the other DT3-E, thus they will be designated as "DT3-N" to distinguish them from non-refurbished cars.
