= LHB prototype carriages =

LHB prototype cars
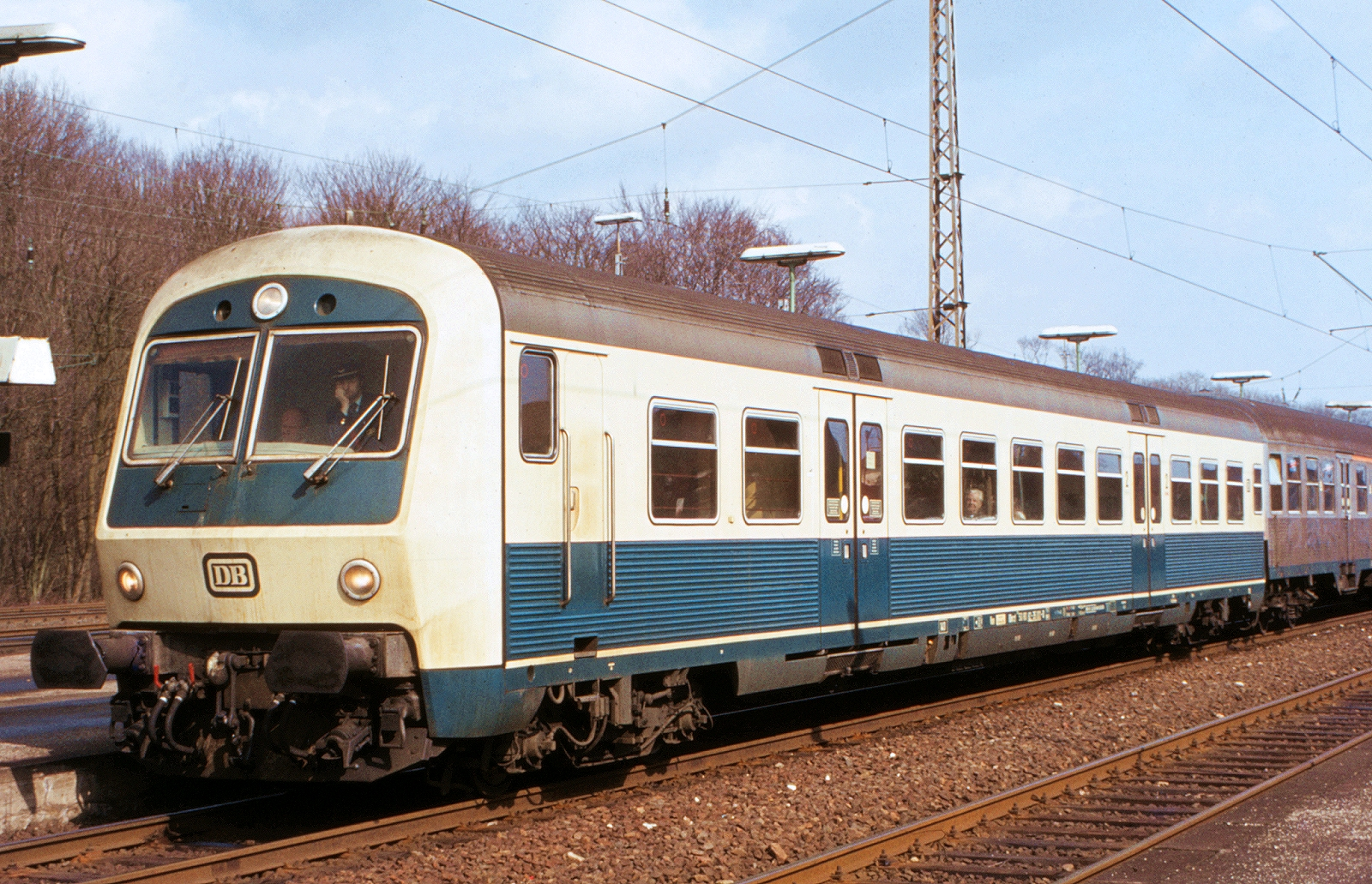
- Driving trailer Bnrzf^{732} on 25 March 1985 in Haste
- In service: 1976–1998
- Manufacturers: LHB (10) and; MBB (1)
- Constructed: 1976
- Number built: Driving trailer 2nd class: 2; Trailer 1st/2nd class: 3; Trailer 2nd class: 6
- Diagram: Driving trailer 2nd class: Bnrzf^{732}; Trailer 1st/2nd class: ABnrzb^{705/706}; Trailer 2nd class: Bnrzb^{726/727/731}

Specifications
- Car length: Driving trailer: 26,400 mm (86 ft 7 1/4 in) over buffers
- Width: 2,830 mm (9 ft 3 3/8 in)
- Height: Driving trailer: 3,859 mm (12 ft 7 7/8 in) above top of rail
- Wheel diameter: 730 mm (2 ft 4 3/4 in)
- Maximum speed: New: 160 km/h (99 mph); later: 140 km/h (87 mph)
- Weight: Driving trailer: 23,500 kg (51,800 lb); Trailer: 28,000–29,000 kg (62,000–64,000 lb)
- HVAC: Electric (Lhzes)
- UIC classification: 2′2′
- Braking systems: Train: Air disc brake KE-GPR-A with electropneumatic control; Parking: Spindle hand brake
- Safety system: Indusi
- Multiple working: konventionelle Wendezugsteuerung
- Seating: Driving trailer: 80 (2nd); Trailer 1st/2nd: 24/27 (1st), 48 (2nd); Trailer 2nd: 88 (2nd)
- Track gauge: 1,435 mm (4 ft 8 1/2 in)

The Linke-Hofmann-Busch local traffic prototype coaches were a series of passenger carriages developed for the Deutsche Bundesbahn's local and regional passenger services. Designed in collaboration with the Bundesbahn-Zentralamt (BZA) in Minden, eleven prototype coaches were built in 1976, ten by Linke-Hofmann-Busch (LHB) and one by Messerschmitt-Bölkow-Blohm (MBB).

The coaches featured a lower floor height, improved passenger entrances, more spacious seating arrangements and upgraded heating and ventilation systems. The ten LHB coaches had stainless-steel bodies, while the MBB prototype used an aluminium construction. The prototypes were primarily tested in the Hannover region, where they operated on local and regional services. Although intended to improve passenger comfort and serve as successors to the existing Silberling coaches, the design was not adopted for series production.

== History and usage ==
In 1976, rolling stock manufacturers Waggonfabriken Linke-Hofmann-Busch (LHB) and Messerschmitt-Bölkow-Blohm (MBB) built eleven prototypes of a new low-floor local traffic carriage developed in collaboration with the Bundesbahn-Zentralamt in Minden. The type was intended to succeed the n carriages, which had been built in large numbers since 1958 and were considered increasingly outdated in terms of passenger comfort by the 1970s.

The prototypes differed from the n carriages through their lower floor height and more comfortable entrances, improved interior design with greater seat spacing, and better heating and ventilation systems. The ten LHB coaches featured corrugated stainless-steel bodies, while the MBB coach was constructed using aluminium. The prototypes were tested in the Hannover region from 1977, primarily on routes between Hannover, Hameln and Haste, as well as services to Minden and Nienburg. They were initially operated in dedicated train formations and were later also used in mixed formations with Silberling coaches.

The prototypes were not followed by series production, as their construction costs and lower seating capacity made them uneconomical for the Deutsche Bundesbahn. However, they served as predecessors to the x-Wagen developed for S-Bahn services, with the latter drawing on the technical experience gained from the earlier prototypes.

After delivery, these vehicles were used almost exclusively in local passenger services in the Greater Hannover area. From 1977, they were primarily deployed on routes between Hannover and Hameln, as well as via Weetzen to Haste, with occasional services to Minden and Nienburg. These routes later formed part of the StadtExpress and present-day S-Bahn networks. Class 141 locomotives were commonly used to haul the trains. Initially operated in dedicated formations, the coaches were later also used in mixed formations with Silberling coaches.

At a time when local passenger rail services faced increasing cost pressures, the LHB prototypes were relatively expensive vehicles. Their more elaborate interiors contributed to the higher costs, while their standard second-class coaches accommodated 88 passengers, eight fewer than comparable n carriages. Consequently, the Deutsche Bundesbahn considered series production too expensive, and the eleven prototypes remained the only vehicles of this type to be built. Instead, the n carriages continued to be manufactured until 1980 in a slightly improved version.

== Construction ==
The ten LHB coaches were built using steel construction, while the single MBB coach featured an aluminium body. The LHB coaches were clad in corrugated stainless steel manufactured under licence from the American Budd Company. They featured lightweight construction, a lower floor height, and electropneumatically operated double sliding doors with folding steps. Other features included LD 76 bogies with air suspension, air heating, and more comfortable seats with a greater seat pitch. Different seat types and seating arrangements were tested across the coaches.

The height difference between the lower floor and the standard-height gangway was bridged by ramps, allowing the coaches to be coupled with conventional passenger carriages of the period. All coaches shared the same basic layout and consistent entrance-door positions. The driving trailers differed in having a larger driver's cab, which occupied the space of one compartment. They were also equipped with the unified driver's desk introduced with the DB Class 111 locomotives. The driving control system used the 36-pin conventional push-pull control system (Konventionelle Wendezugsteuerung, KWS).

The LHB prototypes were closely related to the x-Wagen developed for the Rhein-Ruhr and Nuremberg S-Bahn networks. In addition to their visual and structural similarities, several design features of the prototypes were carried over to the x-Wagen, including the lower floor height, elements of the interior design, the air-heating system and the bogies, with minor modifications.

== Reuse for intercity push-pull trains ==
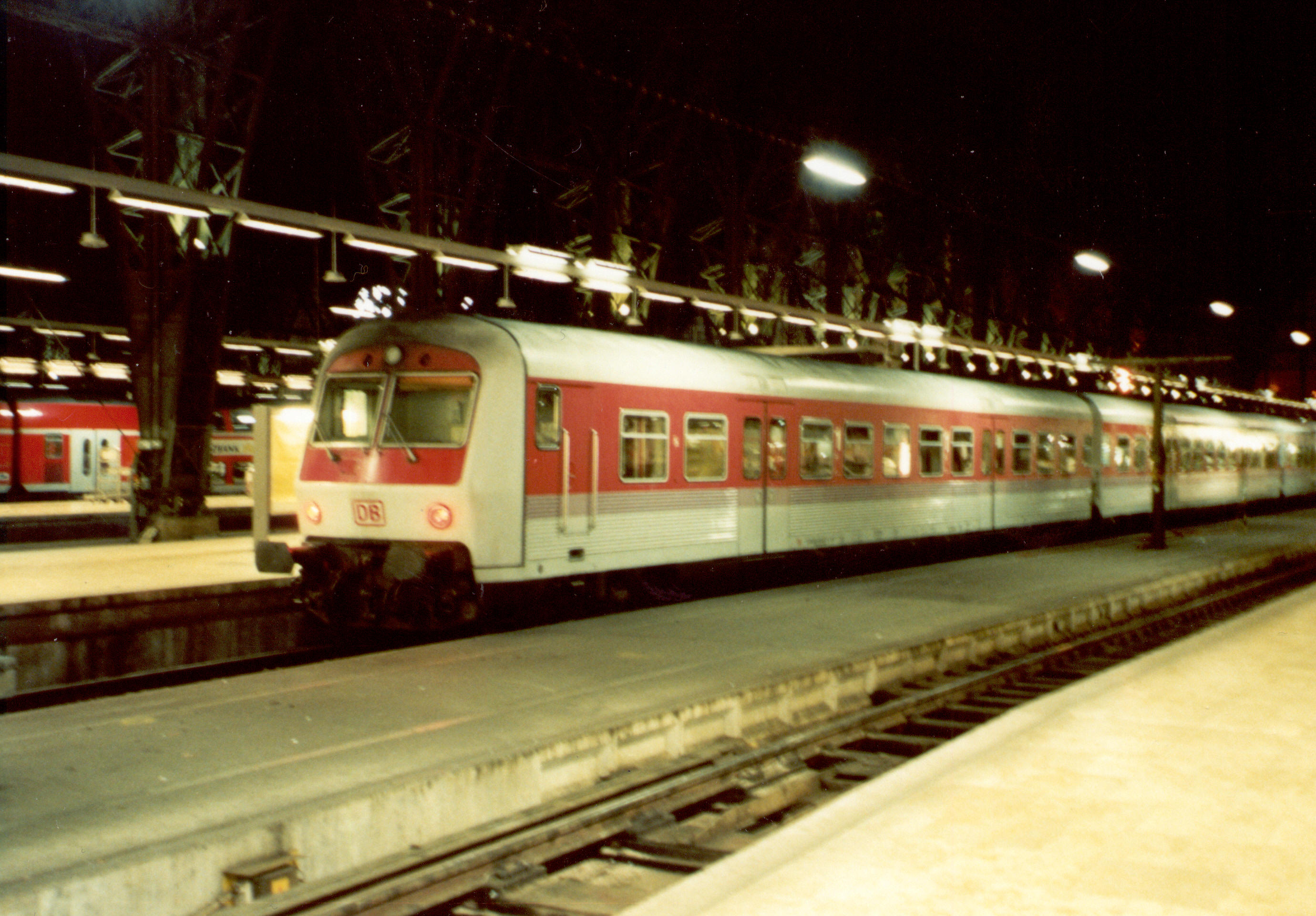
Push-pull train IC 922 toward Düsseldorf Flughafen consisting of rebuilt LHB cars in Frankfurt (Main) Hbf

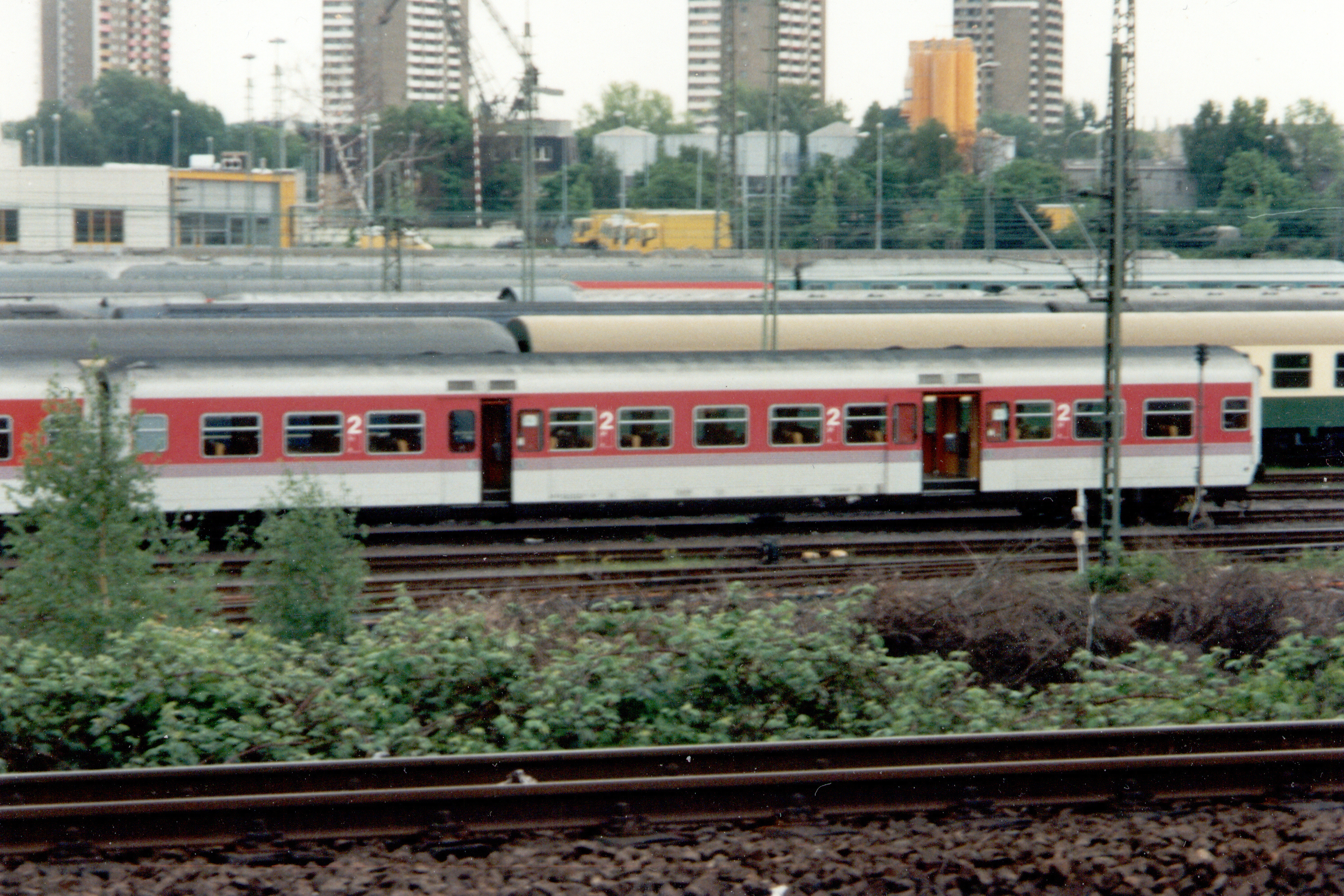
Consist for the night-time IC 922 to Düsseldorf Flughafen, parked at Frankfurt Hauptbahnhof, consisting of the LHB prototypes.

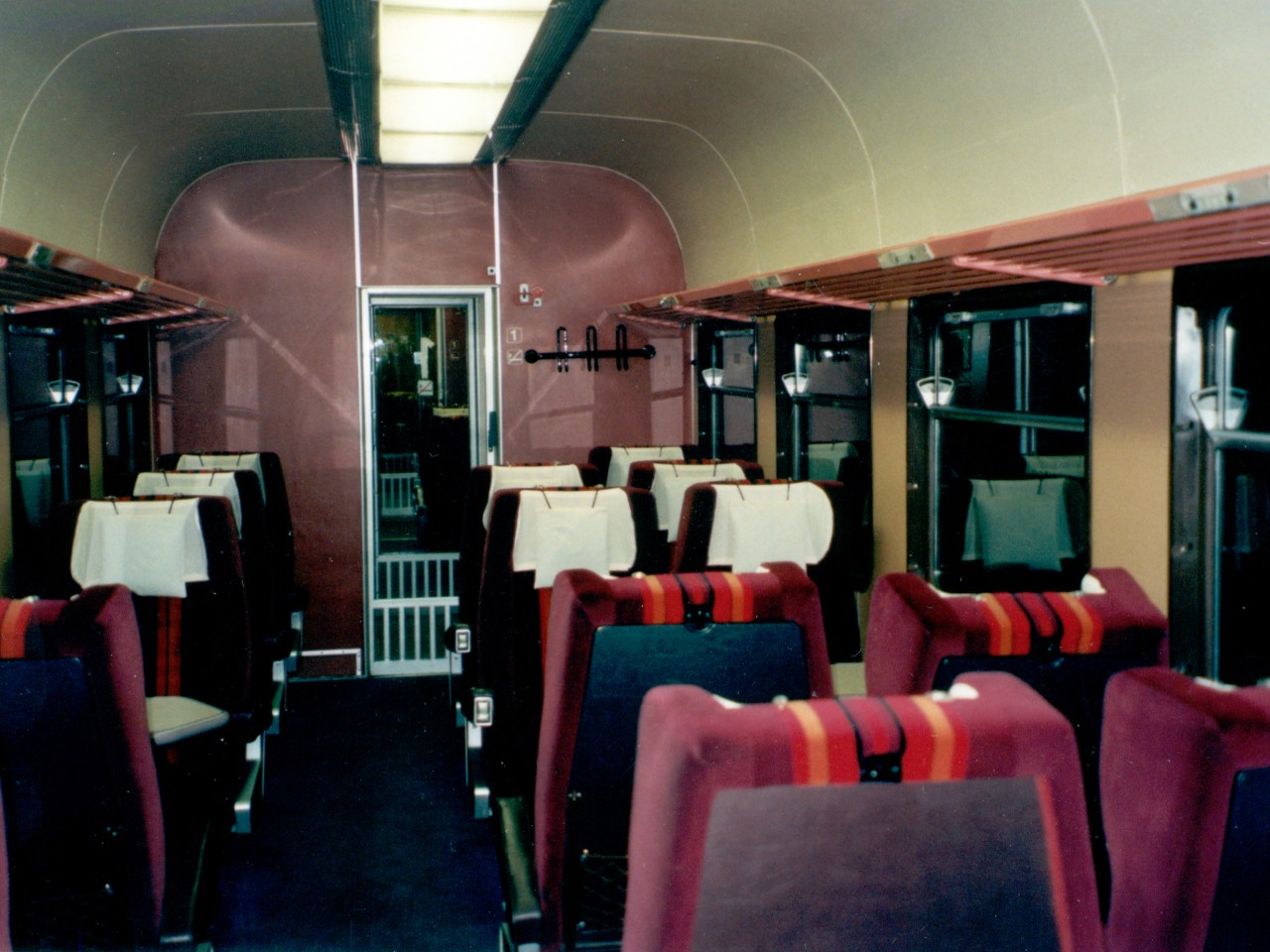
InterCity interior of an Azf 209 on 6 May 1998

In 1988, the first part of the Hanover-Würzburg high-speed line was opened to traffic, which meant a large-scale reorganisation of the InterCity network in Germany. Under the new system, Wiesbaden, the state capital of Hesse, would no longer see any InterCity services. The state government considered it inadequate to only connect the city by local trains and S-Bahn services, however, and asserted a shuttle service between Wiesbaden, Frankfurt and Mainz. DB considered the LHB prototypes and modified a number of them into InterCity carriages so that two push-pull trains became available. The two driving trailers Bnrzf^{732} retained their open coach seating and were rebuilt into 1st class carriages Azf^{209}. Five coaches were rebuilt into Bz^{298} from the four Bnrz^{726} and the Bnrz^{727} and were equipped with the interior of the Bpmz coaches originally built for the IC '79 system.

These were the first push-pull trains in the Deutsche Bundesbahn's InterCity network. The first series-produced long-distance driving trailers, the Interregio driving trailers Bimdzf 269, were introduced in 1995. The two push-pull formations, known as "Wiesbaden-City", initially operated on the regular InterCity service between Wiesbaden Hbf and Mainz Hbf. From June 1991, one formation continued to operate between Wiesbaden and Mainz, while the other was assigned to the "Airport-City" service between Wiesbaden and Frankfurt (Main) Hbf.

Class 141 locomotives were commonly used to haul the trains, with some carrying the orient-red colour scheme introduced for Deutsche Bundesbahn locomotives in the early 1990s. As the converted coaches were not completed on schedule, replacement formations consisting of ordinary InterCity coaches hauled by a locomotive at each end were initially used until March 1989. Such substitutions also occurred later because the coaches were a small prototype fleet, making spare-parts availability and maintenance increasingly difficult. Services frequently operated with a mixture of converted and unconverted LHB coaches or ordinary passenger coaches, including n-Wagen. In their later years, the driving trailers could no longer be used for push-pull operation and were often employed as ordinary passenger coaches.

During the 1990s, the coaches were also used on overnight airport connections under the name "Airport-City", serving destinations including Ludwigshafen, Karlsruhe, Stuttgart and Düsseldorf Airport. Following the discontinuation of the Wiesbaden-City services in 1995, their remaining principal use was on the overnight InterCity service between Frankfurt (Main) Hbf and Düsseldorf Flughafen. The remaining coaches were withdrawn from service and taken out of use at the end of May 1998.

== Fate ==
The non-rebuilt vehicles were scrapped, while most of the coaches converted for InterCity services were also eventually scrapped. After their withdrawal from service in May 1998, the Wiesbaden-City coaches were initially stored in Frankfurt (Main) before being sold and distributed to various locations. One of the converted second-class coaches, Bz 298 (50 80 28-35 001-7), survives in Marne, where it is used as an office coach by the Draisinenbahn. The two driving trailers were transferred to the Netinera works in Neustrelitz after their withdrawal from service.

== Built coach types ==
The following types were built:

Type	Year	Number	Notes
ABnrzb^{705}	LHB 1976	2	Compartments in 1st class, withdrawn 1993
ABnrzb^{706}	LHB 1976	1	Open coach in 1st class, withdrawn 1993
Bnrzb^{726}	LHB 1976	4	1988/1993 rebuilt into Bpz(b)^{298}, withdrawn 1998
Bnrzb^{727}	LHB 1976	1	1988 rebuilt into Bpzb^{298}, withdrawn 1998
Bnrzb^{731}	MBB 1976	1	Aluminium construction, different sidewall corrugation, withdrawn 1993
Bnrzf^{732}	LHB 1976	2	Driving trailer, 1988 rebuilt into Apzf^{209}, withdrawn 1998

The coaches were subsequently reclassified. The meanings of the classification letters 'b' and 'p' were changed, and both letters were eventually dropped from the vehicles' designations. The (A)Bnrzb coaches became (A)Bnrz, while the Apzf and Bpzb coaches were redesignated Azf and Bz, respectively, in 1993.
