= Alstom Transport Deutschland =

German manufacturing company producing locomotives, trams and rolling stock (1834–2009)

- Type: Subsidiary
- Industry: Rail transport
- Founded: 1834; 192 years ago
- Successor: Alstom
- Headquarters: Salzgitter, Lower Saxony
- Area served: Worldwide
- Products: Locomotives; High-speed trains Intercity and commuter trains Trams; People movers Signalling systems
- Parent: Alstom

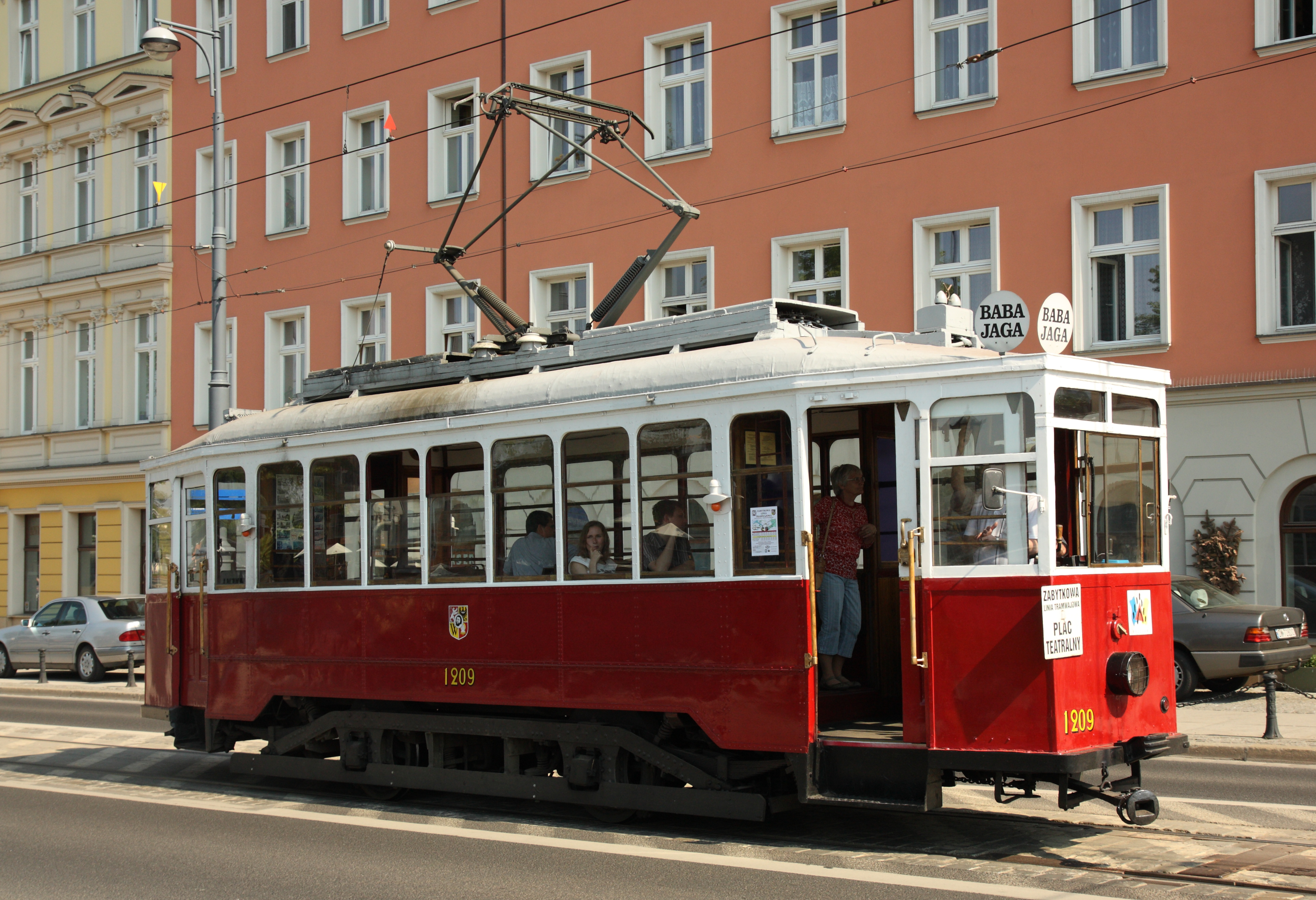
A historic LH carriage on the tourist line in Wrocław, Poland

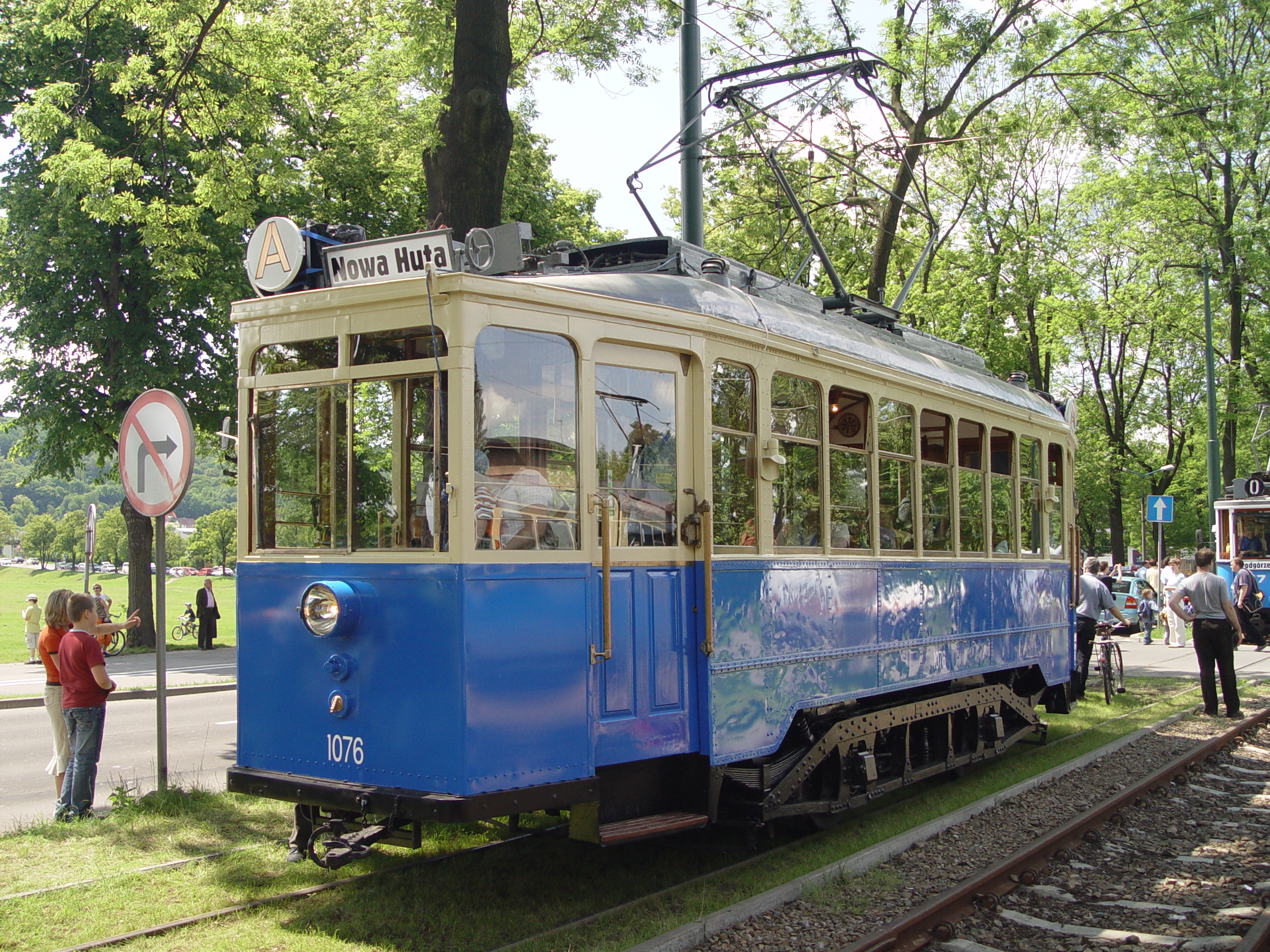
Preserved Linke-Hofmann tram (originally from Wrocław), Kraków, Poland

Alstom Transport Deutschland, formerly Linke-Hofmann-Busch, is a German manufacturing company originally established in Breslau (now Wrocław, Poland) to produce locomotives and rolling stock. Its origins lay in the wheelwright business of Gottfried Linke, begun in 1834. After World War II, the company was reestablished in Salzgitter in West Germany. In 1994, GEC Alsthom acquired a 51% shareholding. It is now part of Alstom; the name Linke-Hofmann-Busch ceased to be used in 2009 when it became Alstom Transport Deutschland GmbH.

== Aircraft industry ==
During World War I, it became one of many companies in Germany drawn into the aircraft industry even though they had no prior experience in aircraft design.

Linke-Hofmann-Busch first entered the aircraft industry by repairing and constructing aircraft designed by other established companies under licence, such as the Roland C.IIa, Albatros B.IIa, C.III and C.X. In 1916 Linke-Hofmann-Busch was awarded a contract to design and build a four-engined heavy bomber under the Riesenflugzeug ("giant aircraft") designation. Two designs were built in prototype form, the R.I and the R.II; both designs were unconventional. The R.I was unsuccessful, but the Linke-Hofmann R.II flew well. However, the war ended before it could go into production. Post-war attempts to build R.II's as passenger and transport aircraft were prevented by the Allied Control Commission which was concerned about bombers being built illicitly, under the guise of airliners, and the possible resumption of the war.

== Rail products ==
=== Heavy rail ===
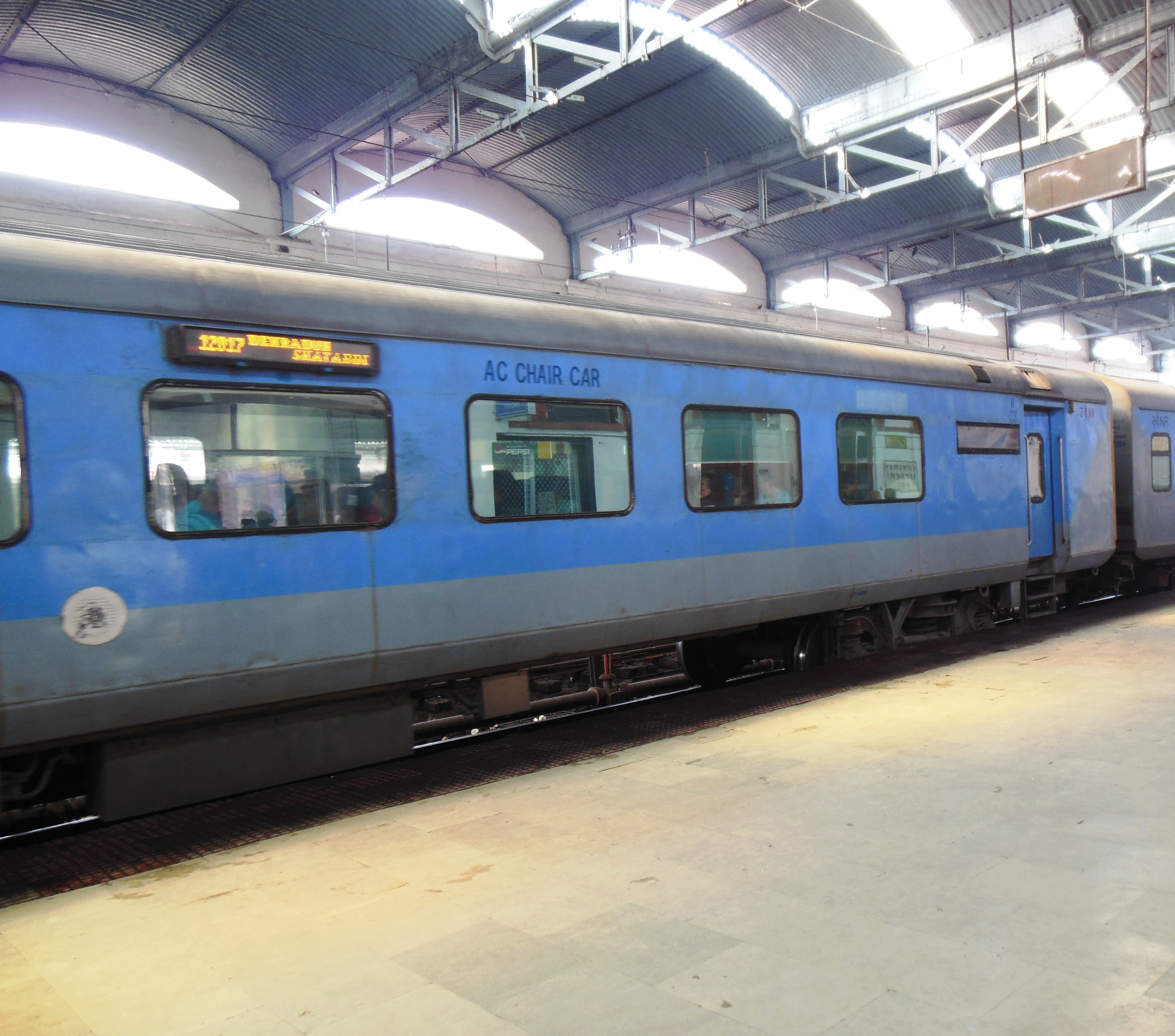
LHB Shatabdi Express Coach of Indian Railways

- Prototype carriages for the Deutsche Bundesbahn (1976).
- Indian Railways' LHB coach are based on a design developed by Linke-Hofmann-Busch.

=== Suburban rail ===
- Litra SA and Litra SE for the Copenhagen S-tog (with Siemens, 1996–2006)
- CIÉ 8100 Class for the Dublin Area Rapid Transit (with GEC, 1983–1984): built to a metro-style specification.
- DB Class 420 for S-Bahn services in Munich, Rhine-Main, Rhine-Ruhr, and Stuttgart.

=== Metro ===
- M1, M2 and M3 series for the Amsterdam Metro (1973–1980)
- 1st generation stock for the Athens Metro (with Siemens and Adtranz).
- DT2 series for the Hamburg U-Bahn (with Kiepe).
- DT4 series for the Hamburg U-Bahn (with ABB).

=== Light Rail ===
- TT Class 8 for the Trondheim Tramway (1984)
- P86 stock for the Docklands Light Railway in East London (1986), now used on the Essen Stadtbahn
- TW 2000 for the Hanover Stadtbahn (1997–2000)

== See also ==
- Pafawag, former Linke-Hofmann factory in Wrocław (Breslau) nationalised in 1945
