= Letterstick Band =

- Origin: Maningrida, Australia
- Genres: Reggae, Rock
- Label: CAAMA
- Members: Colin Maxwell; David Maxwell; Terence Wilson; Tim Wilson; Roly Milak; Mark Mirikul; Allen Murphy

Letterstick Band are a band from north-east Arnhem Land in Australia. The members are from the An-Barra Clan on the coast near Maningrida. They are named after the wooden tools on which messages are carved to communicate between places. They play a mixture of reggae and rock that has been called saltwater rock and they sing in English and in Arnhem Land languages.

Letterstick Band won a Deadly for Band of the Year in 2001. They are the subjects of the documentary Diyama - Soundtracks of Maningrida.

== Discography ==
- An-Barra Clan (1998) - CAAMA
- Diyama (2003) - CAAMA
