= Athens Metro rolling stock =

Electric Multiple Units (EMU) are powered on the metro network of Athens, with five or six coaches. EMU-5s are of a former type and are limited to Line 1. On Lines 2 and 3, routes are only operated with EMU-6s. The trainsets were put into operation by STASY (Statheres Sygkoinonies) in 2011, with its establishment (previously operated from the companies ISAP S.A. for Line 1 and AMEL S.A. for Lines 2&3).

== Line 1 Historical stock ==
=== Steam locomotives ===
==== SAP (Athens-Piraeus Railway Company) ====
In the early period (1869–1904) the railway used 22 steam tank locomotives of about 6 different types. The majority were of 2-4-0T configuration, made in the United Kingdom by Hudswell Clarke and Sharp Stewart. After electrification, some the steam locomotives were sold to the Hellenic State Railways (SEK).

Table of steam locomotives
Name(s)	Type	Quantity	Manufacturer	Serial Nos.	Year	Notes
Constantine	0-6-0T	1	Hudswell Clarke		1868	
Olga, George	2-4-0T	2	Hudswell Clarke		1868	
	0-4-2T	1	Neilson & Co.		1866	
	2-4-0T	1	Sharp Stewart		c.1878	
	2-4-0T	6	Sharp Stewart / Hudswell Clarke		1879–1884	
	2-4-0T	2	Sharp Stewart		1892	
Marina	0-6-0ST	1	Manning Wardle		1892	to SEK 51, class Δα (1st)
	4-4-0T	2	Neilson & Co.		1892	to SEK 301–302, later 21–22, class Γα
	0-4-2T	3	Saint-Léonard		1896	

==== Lavrion Square–Strofyli railway ====
Initially Attica Railways used nine Tubize 0-6-2T steam locomotives (1885). Later it acquired nine Krauss Z 2-6-0T, plus one of the same type constructed in Piraeus by Vassiliadis Works. After 1929 only the Tubize locomotives remained in use on the Kifissia line, as the Krauss locomotives were transferred to SPAP for the Lavrion branch.

=== First generation EMUs ===
Since electrification (1904) the railway used almost exclusively electric multiple unit (EMU) trains. The vehicles are classified in batches (or deliveries). The first four batches consisted of wooden passenger cars on iron or steel frames. Currently only a train of six wooden railcars is preserved, modified with the addition of Scharfenberg couplers at each end and is displayed during special events.

Batch	Year	Description	Photograph
1st		Locomotive hauled stock	
2nd	1904	40 railcars (20 DM and 20 T) made by Thomson Houston/Desouches David & Cie. Withdrawn in 1985.	Train consist of 2nd, 3rd and 4th batches.
3rd	1914	9 railcars made by Baume et Marpent/Desouches David & Cie. Withdrawn in 1985.	Train consist of 2nd, 3rd and 4th batches.
4th	1923	12 railcars of the Baume et Marpent design, built at Piraeus Works. Withdrawn 1985.	Train consist of 2nd, 3rd and 4th batches.
-	1947–1948	Rebuilding and modernization of damaged rolling stock	Train consist of 2nd, 3rd and 4th batches.

The first generation rolling stock was numbered as in the following table:

Marking	number	type
A1 to A11	11	DT
Γ417 to Γ427	11	DT
F410 to F418	18	T
B601 to B621	21	DM
Total	61	

=== Second generation EMUs ===
The fifth (1951), sixth (1958) and seventh (1968) batches were of steel construction, made by Siemens-MAN. At the same time Scharfenberg couplers were introduced.

Batch	Year	Manufacturer	Configuration	Type	Numbering	Description	Photograph
5th	1951	MAN, Siemens	DM-DT or DM-DTL	DM	901–912	24 railcars, in 12 EMU-2 trains. Withdrawn in 1995.	
5th	1951	MAN, Siemens	DM-DT or DM-DTL	DTL	701–706	24 railcars, in 12 EMU-2 trains. Withdrawn in 1995.	
5th	1951	MAN, Siemens	DM-DT or DM-DTL	DT	801–806	24 railcars, in 12 EMU-2 trains. Withdrawn in 1995.	
6th	1958	MAN, Siemens	DM-DT or DM-DTL	DM	913–928	32 railcars, in 16 EMU-2 trains. Withdrawn in 2003–2004.	
6th	1958	MAN, Siemens	DM-DT or DM-DTL	DTL	707–714	32 railcars, in 16 EMU-2 trains. Withdrawn in 2003–2004.	
6th	1958	MAN, Siemens	DM-DT or DM-DTL	DT	807–814	32 railcars, in 16 EMU-2 trains. Withdrawn in 2003–2004.	
7th	1968–1969	MAN, Siemens	DM-DT or DM-DTL	DM	929–937	18 railcars, in 8 EMU-2 trains. Some rearranged in EMU-5 trains. Withdrawn in 2003–2004.	
7th	1968–1969	MAN, Siemens	DM-DT or DM-DTL	DTL	715–718	18 railcars, in 8 EMU-2 trains. Some rearranged in EMU-5 trains. Withdrawn in 2003–2004.	
7th	1968–1969	MAN, Siemens	DM-DT or DM-DTL	DT	815–819	18 railcars, in 8 EMU-2 trains. Some rearranged in EMU-5 trains. Withdrawn in 2003–2004.	

=== Third generation EMUs ===
Trains of batch 9 were made by LEW in the German Democratic Republic and have been withdrawn. Trains of batches 8,10,11 which also part of third generation EMUs are still in use.

Batch	Year	Configuration	Type	Numbering	Description	Photograph
9th	1983–1985	DM-M+M-DM	DM	1101–1125	50 railcars made of aluminium LEW (type GIII) in EMU-4 sets later rearranged in EMU-6 (DM-M+M-DM+M-DM). In limited use after 1999 and all withdrawn until 2004.	
9th	1983–1985	DM-M+M-DM	M	2201–2225	50 railcars made of aluminium LEW (type GIII) in EMU-4 sets later rearranged in EMU-6 (DM-M+M-DM+M-DM). In limited use after 1999 and all withdrawn until 2004.	

=== Other rolling stock ===
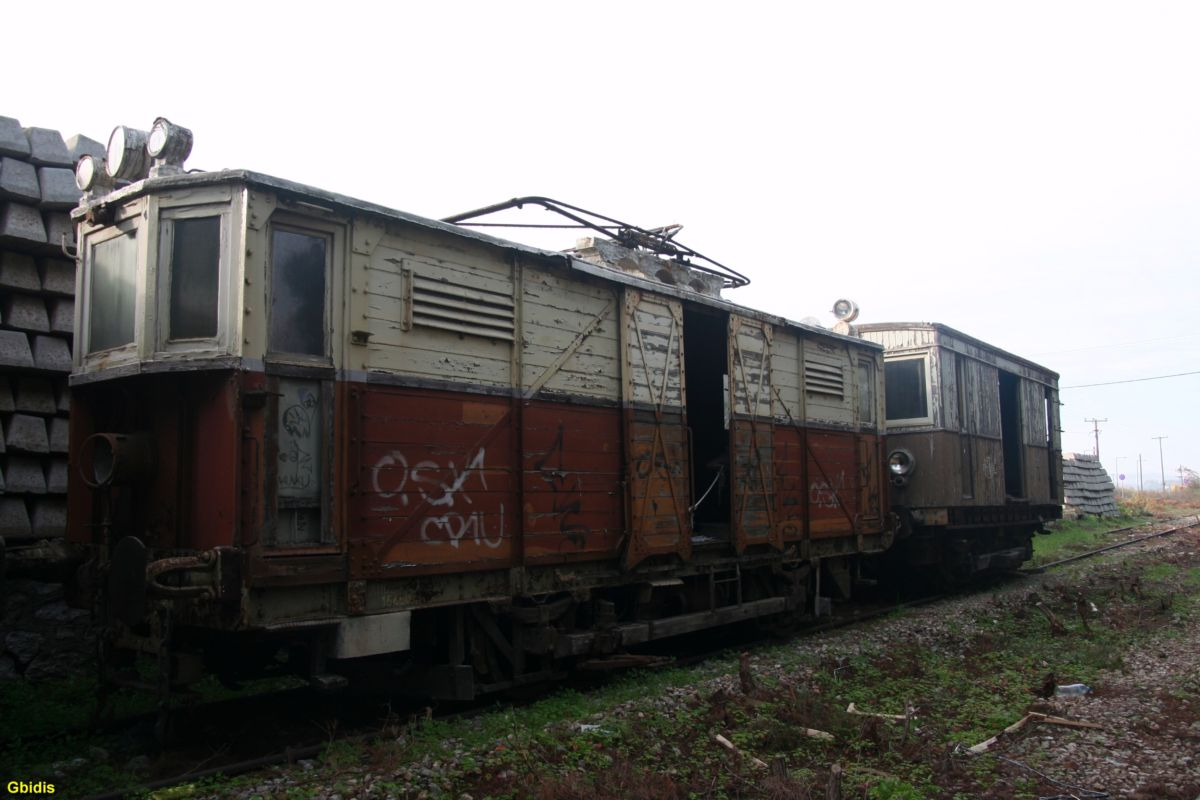
Freight railcar 41

In 1904 two electric locomotives, numbered 20 and 21, were bought from Thomson-Houston.

In 1911 the railway bought from Goossens two steeple-cab electric locomotives (numbered 31 and 32) and a self-propelled electric freight railcar (41), capable of operating from third rail or overhead line. These could operate over the Piraeus Harbour tramway, the Piraeus-Perama light railway as well as on the mainline to Thision and Omonoia. Freight railcar 41 was used initially to carry bags of transcontinental mail unloaded from passenger liners in Piraeus. Locomotive 32 is still in use, with the overhead collector removed.

In addition the railway owns a road-rail Unimog car and a ballast tamper.

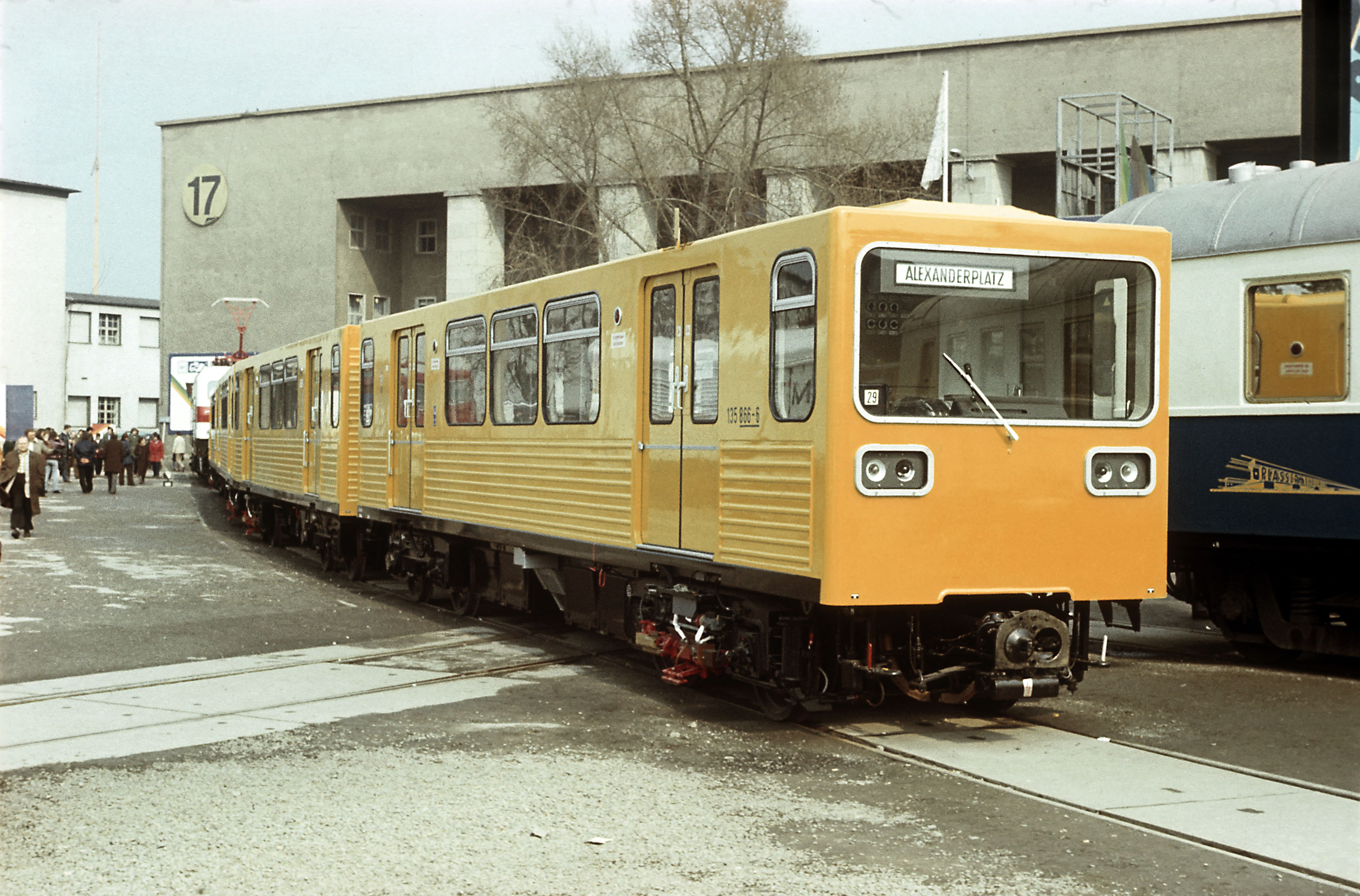
LEW type GI train from the Berlin Metro was used in the Athens metro Line 1 between 1981 and 1984.

During 1981–1984 ISAP leased six four-car, bright yellow trains of narrow loading gauge (type G-I or Gisela) from East Berlin's metro.

In the early 1980s consideration was given to the purchase of 60 secondhand cars of London Underground R Stock, built between 1938 and 1959, but ultimately no deal was made and new carriages were purchased instead.

=== Piraeus rolling stock works ===
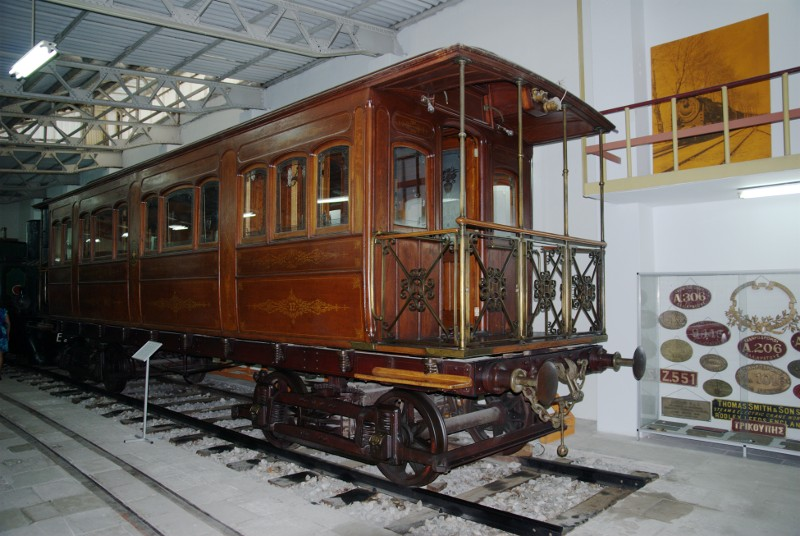
The Royal Saloon (1888)

Athens & Piraeus Railway, in common with most railways of the steam era, had its own rolling stock heavy maintenance works, located next to Piraeus station. In 1926 this became property of E.I.S. In addition to maintenance, repair and rebuilding, Piraeus works constructed a significant number of railway cars, mostly between 1880 and 1960. The most significant projects were the construction of 12 electric rail cars in 1923 and the rebuilding of rolling stock destroyed by allied bombing in 1944. Another noteworthy project was the construction of a small number of electric trams, based on a Dick Kerr model (1939).

An excellent example of the technical skill available at Piraeus works is the Royal Saloon (1888), a present to King George I of Greece. This luxurious vehicle was much admired and it was exhibited at the 1888 "Olympia Fair" (First Athens International Exhibition) held in Zappeion. The Royal Saloon survives to date, and is exhibited in the Railway Museum of Athens.

== Line 1 rolling stock ==
Batch	Manufacturer	Image	Lines	Number of Coaches per Trainset	Number of Doors per Side	Passengers	Max Speed (km/h)	In service since	About
8th Batch	MAN SE, Siemens Mobility, LEW Hennigsdorf (original stock) CAF (refurbished stock)	8th Batch trainset at Piraeus station in (2011)		5	4	830 (174 seated and 656 standing (5 persons/ m 2)	80 km/h	1983-85 (refurbed trainsets complete by 2027)	The 8th batch, also known as Columbia, from the well-known space shuttle is the oldest of the series of trainsets that runs on the Athens Metro network. As of 2021, 14 trainsets is under upgrade.
10th Batch	MAN SE, AEG, Siemens Mobility, Hellenic Shipyards Co. (current stock) CAF (future refurbished stock)	10th Batch trainset near Thissio station in (2009)		5	4	830 (174 seated and 656 standing (5 persons/ m 2)	80 km/h	1993–95	The 10th batch is the second oldest range of wagons that runs on the Athens Metro network. They are identical in appearance with the 8th batch and known by the same nickname. An upgrade of the train is anticipated.
11th Batch	Adtranz, Siemens Mobility, Hellenic Shipyards Co., Bombardier Transportation	11th Batch trainset at Neratziotissa (2007)		6	4	1,002 (216 seated and 786 standing (5 persons/ m 2)	90 km/h	2000–04	The 11th batch was the only batch of Line 1 of the Athens Metro which has 6 coaches, before 1st generation trains of the Lines 2 and 3 enter service on Line 1. An upgrade of the trains is anticipated.
1st Generation	Siemens Mobility, Daimler-Benz, Alsthοm			6	4	1,030 (806 standing, 244 seated)(5 Passengers / sq.m.)	80 km/h	2000	The 1st generation is the oldest batch of 2 and 3 line trainsets and the only one in the whole network with sliding doors and not locking doors. Some first generation trains are also used on line 1.

== Lines 2 and 3 ==
Name	Manufacturer	Image	Lines	Number of Coaches per Trainset	Number of Doors per side	Max Speed (km/h)	Passengers	Units	In operation since	About
1st Generation	Siemens Mobility, Daimler-Benz, Alsthοm			6	4	80 km/h	1,030 (806 standing, 244 seated)(5 Passengers / sq.m.)	28	2000 (Tests had already begun from 1999)	The 1st generation is the oldest batch of 2 and 3 line trainsets and the only one in the whole network with sliding doors and not locking doors. Some first generation trains are also used on line 1.
2nd Generation	Hanwha-Rotem, Mitsubishi, Vapor, Knorr-Bremse			6	4	80 km/h (DC); 120 km/h (DC/AC)	1,062 (196 seated, 866 standing) (DC) 1,026 (158 seated, 868 standing) (5 passengers / sq.m.) (DC/AC)	21 (7 DC/AC & 14 DC)	2003–04	The second generation operates under the standard line voltage of 750 V DC from third rail, but 7 trains from line 3 are able to operate under 25 kV 50 Hz AC from overhead catenary with a pantograph in order to serve the section from Doukissis Plakentias to the Airport.
3rd Generation	Hyundai Rotem, Siemens Mobility			6	4	80 km/h	1.032 (844 standing, 188 seated) ( 5 passengers / sq.m.)	28	2014	The 3rd generation is the latest model of trainsets running on the Athens Metro network.

- First series (delivery): 28 six-car electric multiple units made by Alstom–Siemens–Adtranz (2000); maximum speed 80 km/h (50 mph)
- Second series (delivery): 21 six-car EMU made by Hanwha-Rotem-Mitsubishi.(2004). Seven of these trains can also operate on OSE lines with 25 kV AC − 50 Hz overhead electrification system and are used for airport service. All second-series trains are air-conditioned. Maximum speed 80 km/h (50 mph) and 120 km/h (75 mph) for the seven trainsets used on the Airport route.
- Third series: Athens Metro ordered 17 additional trains made by Hyundai Rotem.
- Four service hybrid locomotives made by Kaelble-Gmeinder-Siemens. They can operate from a third-rail 750 V DC system or their own diesel generators. They have a B-B configuration, with a maximum power of 550 kW (740 hp) under diesel traction and 600 kW (800 hp) under electric traction.
- One road-rail Unimog

Generation	Year	Configuration	Type	Numbering	Description
1st	2000	DT-M-MD+MD-M-DT	DT	A01-A56	56 EMU-3 halfsets operating as 28 EMU-6 trains. Made by Alstom–Siemens–Adtranz . MD railcars have an auxiliary driving facility used only for shunting.
1st	2000	DT-M-MD+MD-M-DT	M	B01-B56	56 EMU-3 halfsets operating as 28 EMU-6 trains. Made by Alstom–Siemens–Adtranz . MD railcars have an auxiliary driving facility used only for shunting.
1st	2000	DT-M-MD+MD-M-DT	MD	C01-C56	56 EMU-3 halfsets operating as 28 EMU-6 trains. Made by Alstom–Siemens–Adtranz . MD railcars have an auxiliary driving facility used only for shunting.
2nd (DC)	2003–2004	D-T-M+M-T-D	D	D201-D228	28 EMU-3 halfsets operating as 14 EMU-6 trains. Made by Hanwha-Rotem-Mitsubishi.
2nd (DC)	2003–2004	D-T-M+M-T-D	T	T201-T228	28 EMU-3 halfsets operating as 14 EMU-6 trains. Made by Hanwha-Rotem-Mitsubishi.
2nd (DC)	2003–2004	D-T-M+M-T-D	M	M201-M228	28 EMU-3 halfsets operating as 14 EMU-6 trains. Made by Hanwha-Rotem-Mitsubishi.
2nd (DC/AC)	2003–2004	D-T-M+M-T-D	D	D251-D264	14 EMU-3 halfsets operating as 7 EMU-6 trains. Made by Hanwha-Rotem-Mitsubishi, can also operate on 25 kV AC, 50 Hz overhead lines (required for the Doukissis Plakentias-Airport section of the line where track is shared with the Suburban Railway)
2nd (DC/AC)	2003–2004	D-T-M+M-T-D	T	T251-T264	14 EMU-3 halfsets operating as 7 EMU-6 trains. Made by Hanwha-Rotem-Mitsubishi, can also operate on 25 kV AC, 50 Hz overhead lines (required for the Doukissis Plakentias-Airport section of the line where track is shared with the Suburban Railway)
2nd (DC/AC)	2003–2004	D-T-M+M-T-D	M	M251-M264	14 EMU-3 halfsets operating as 7 EMU-6 trains. Made by Hanwha-Rotem-Mitsubishi, can also operate on 25 kV AC, 50 Hz overhead lines (required for the Doukissis Plakentias-Airport section of the line where track is shared with the Suburban Railway)
3rd	2012–2013	D-T-M+M-T-D	D	D301-D334	A contract for 17 air conditioned EMU-6 trains was signed on 2009-09-16 with Hyundai Rotem. 34 EMU-3 halfsets entered service as 17 EMU-6 trains in June 2014.
3rd	2012–2013	D-T-M+M-T-D	T	T301-T334	A contract for 17 air conditioned EMU-6 trains was signed on 2009-09-16 with Hyundai Rotem. 34 EMU-3 halfsets entered service as 17 EMU-6 trains in June 2014.
3rd	2012–2013	D-T-M+M-T-D	M	M301-M334	A contract for 17 air conditioned EMU-6 trains was signed on 2009-09-16 with Hyundai Rotem. 34 EMU-3 halfsets entered service as 17 EMU-6 trains in June 2014.

Railcar codes: DM: driving motor car, DT: driving trailer, M: motor car, T: trailer, MD: motor car with auxiliary driving facility.

== Line 4 ==
Line 4, at some point under the original design, will have automatic trains without a driver. In November 2020, Alstom was chosen to supply the line with 20 4-car automated Metropolis trains, operated under Urbalis 400 signalling system.

== See also ==
- Athens–Piraeus Electric Railways

== Sources ==
https://web.archive.org/web/20091123073235/http://www.isap.gr/eng/page.asp?id=43

https://web.archive.org/web/20180501223652/http://www.theodore.gr/theodore.gr/Transport_Trains_Hlektrikou.html
