= Hamburg U-Bahn Type A =

German U-Bahn train type formerly operated in Hamburg

HHA-Baureihe A / B / T / TU1 / TU2
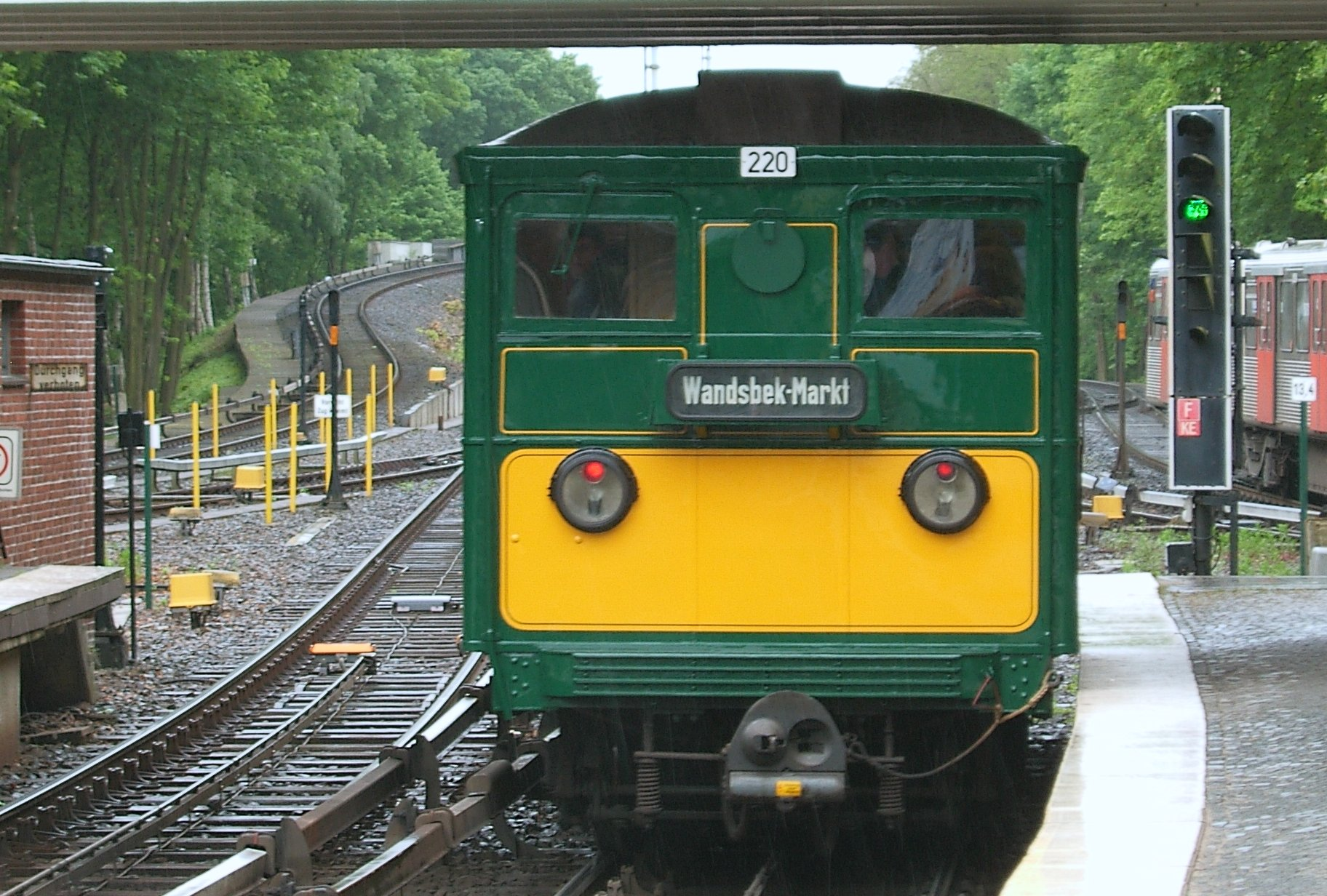
- Type A (T6 car 220) in May 2006
- In service: 1912–1970
- Manufacturer: AEG, Busch, Credé, Waggonfabrik Falkenried, Siemens
- Constructed: 1911–1929, 1940, 1943
- Entered service: 1912
- Refurbished: 1947–53, 1959–61
- Scrapped: 1970
- Number built: 377 cars
- Number preserved: 6 cars
- Number scrapped: 371 cars
- Fleet numbers: 11–417
- Capacity: 34 seats
- Operators: Hamburger Hochbahn AG
- Depots: Barmbek

Specifications
- Train length: 12.80 m (42 ft 0 in)–13 m (42 ft 8 in)
- Width: 2.56 m (8 ft 5 in)
- Height: 3.14 m (10 ft 4 in)
- Doors: 2 per side (per car)
- Maximum speed: 60 km/h (37 mph), 80 km/h (50 mph) (later batches)
- Weight: 24.6 t (24.2 long tons; 27.1 short tons)
- Traction motors: 2x AEG U109 with 81 kW
- Power output: 162 kW (220 hp)
- Acceleration: 0.6m/s²
- Electric system(s): 750 V DC third rail
- Current collector(s): Contact shoe
- UIC classification: Bo'Bo'
- Braking system(s): Air brake
- Safety system(s): Sifa
- Coupling system: Central-buffer coupler, Scharfenberg (from 11. batch onwards)
- Track gauge: 1,435 mm (4 ft 8 1/2 in)

The Type A is an electric multiple unit (EMU) train type formerly operated on the Hamburg U-Bahn system. They were the first type of subway cars in Hamburg, entering service on 15 February 1912, and were later designated as Type T. Some cars were converted to maintenance service cars.

== Variants ==
=== Type A and Type T ===
Type A cars, later designated as Type T, had wooden car bodies and two manually operated sliding doors per side. Seating accommodation consisted of a mix of longitudinal and transverse seats. Some cars were equipped with two cabs. The last Type T car was withdrawn in 1970.

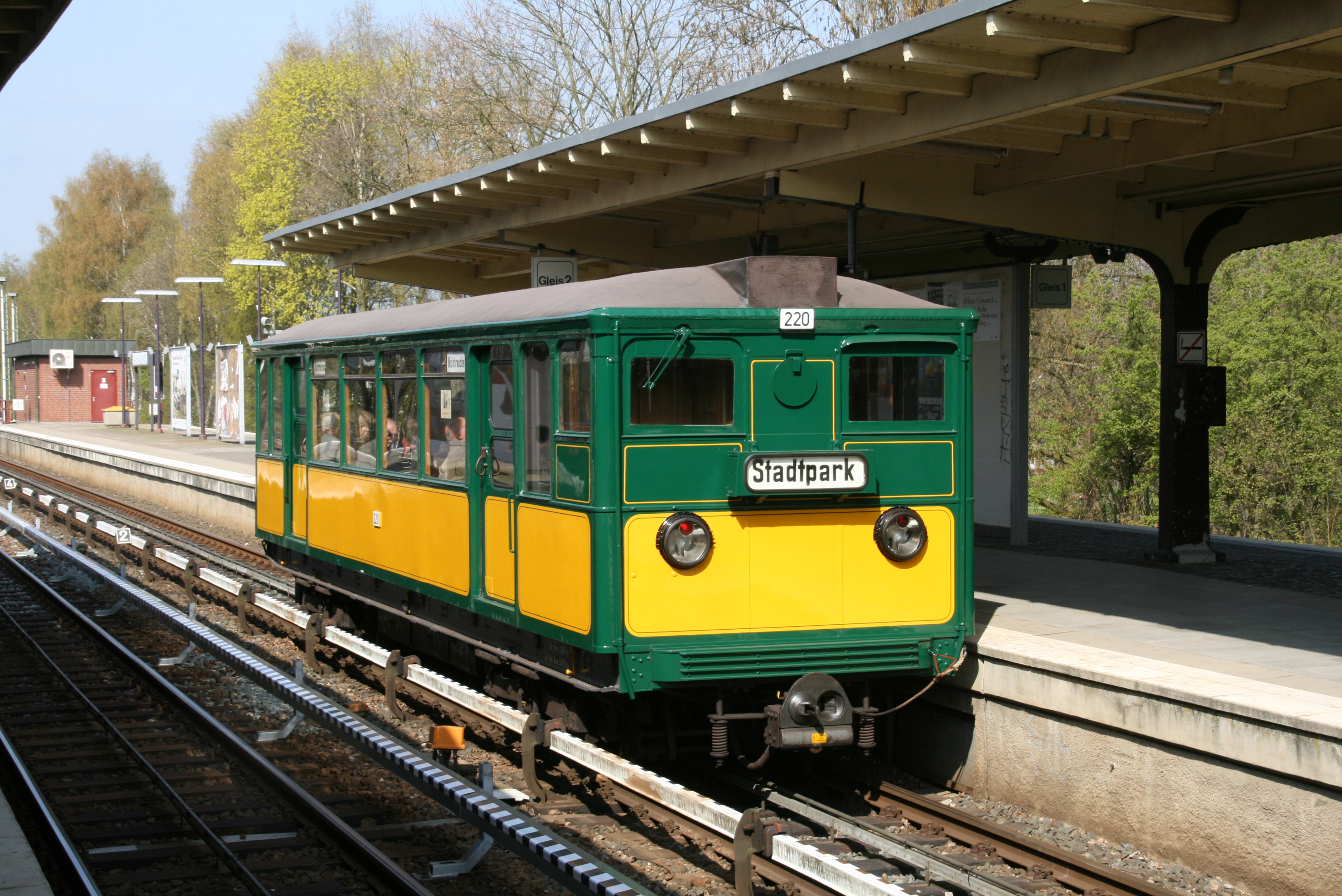
T6 car 220 in April 2010

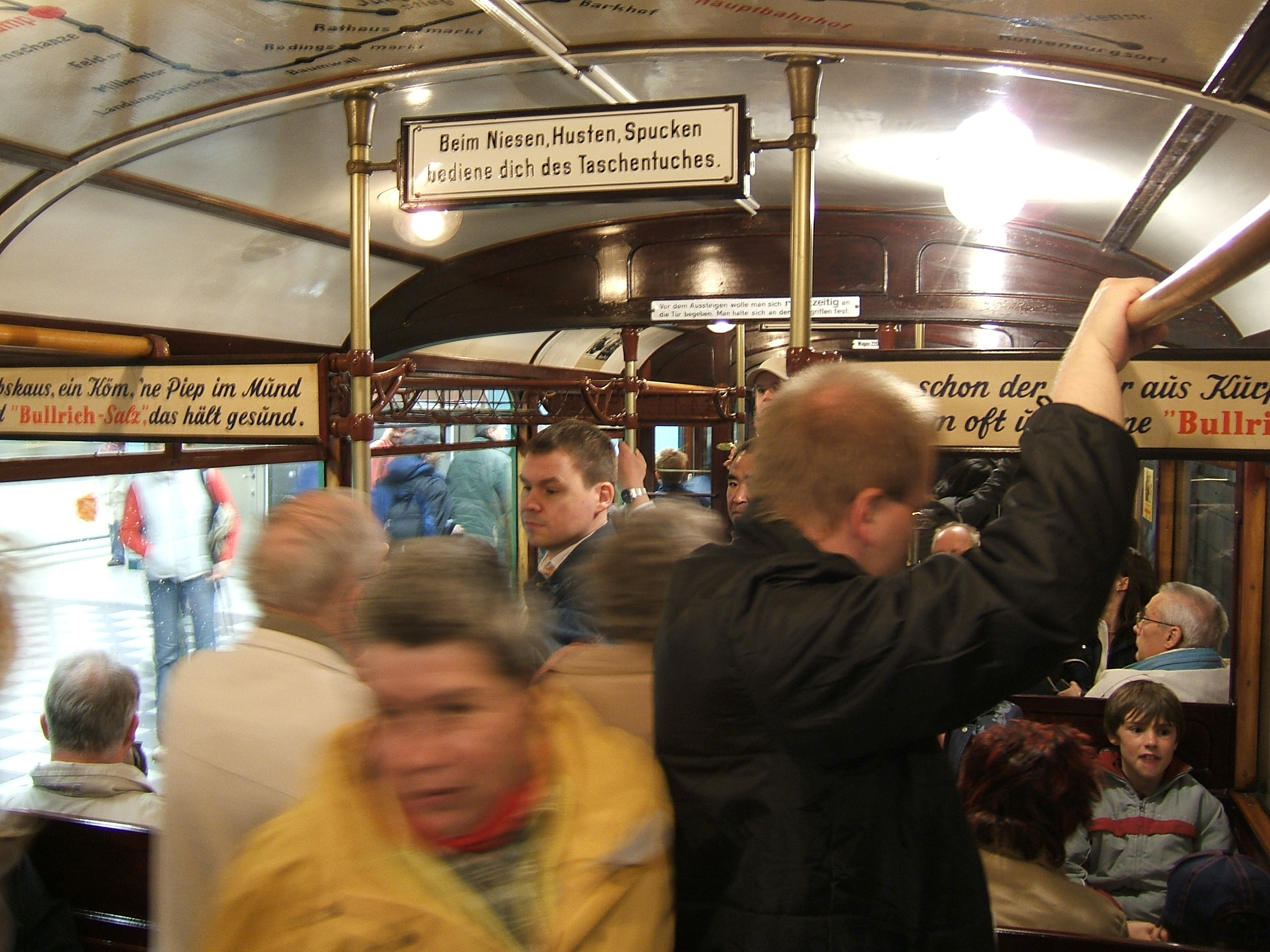
Interior of car 220 in May 2006

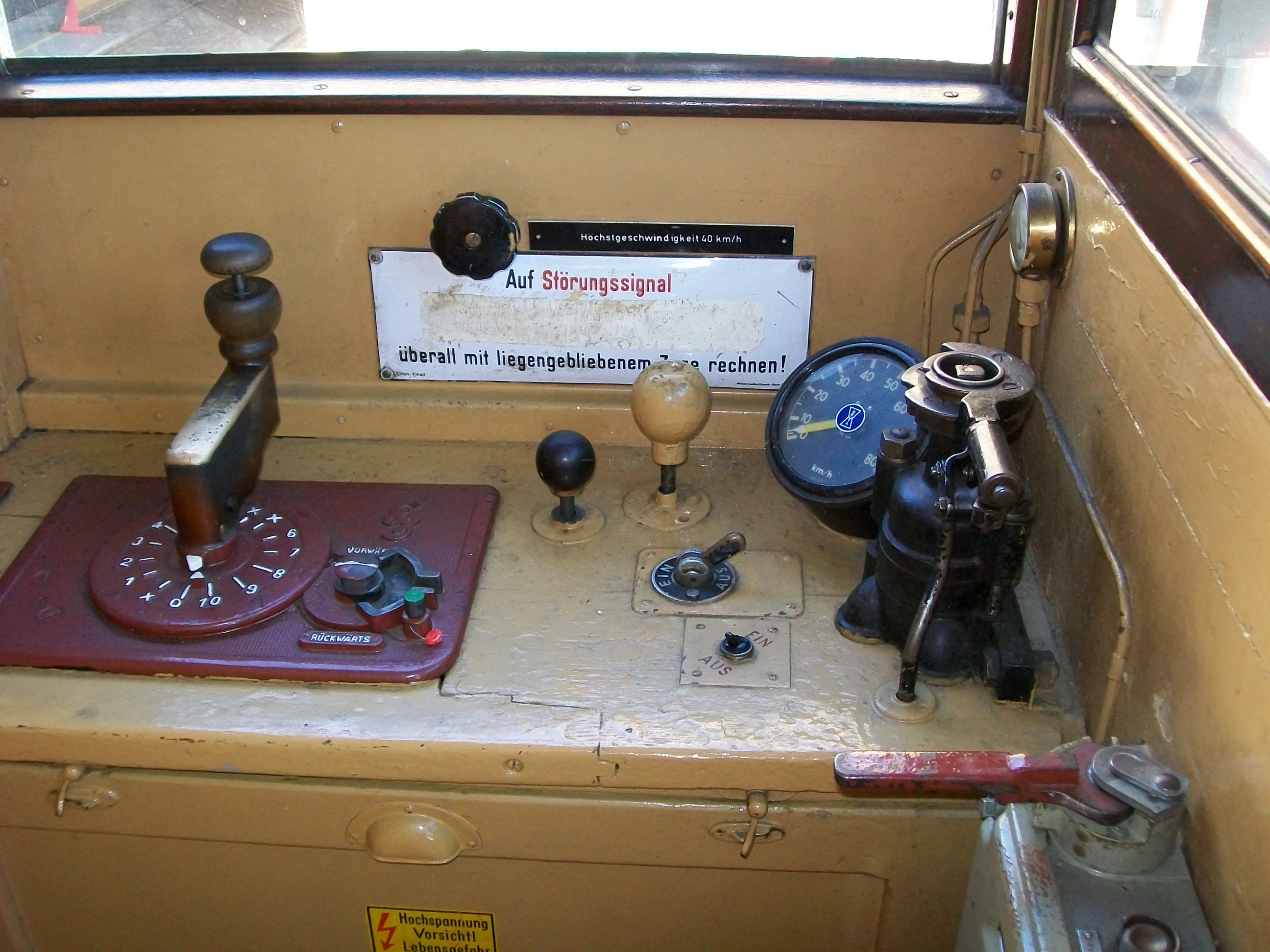
Driver's cabin of a T6 car

=== Type TU1 and TU2 ===
Some cars damaged during World War II were rebuilt with new car bodies and electro-pneumatic doors. These cars rebuilt between 1947 and 1953 were initially redesignated as Type B, but were later designated as Type TU1. 100 cars underwent refurbishment from 1959 until 1961 and received stainless steel paneling and rebuilt car ends, and were designated as Type TU2.

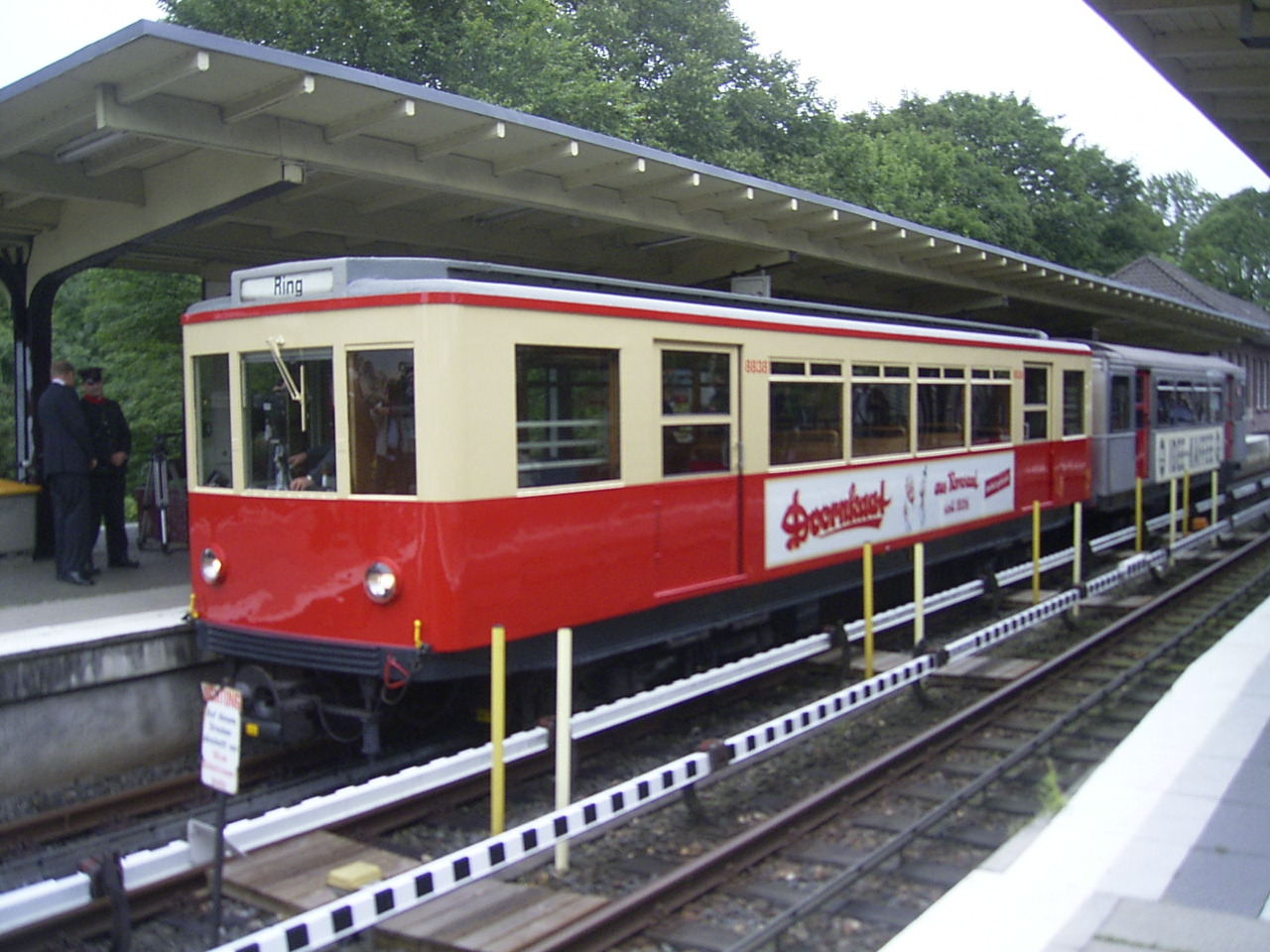
TU1 car 8838 in September 2008

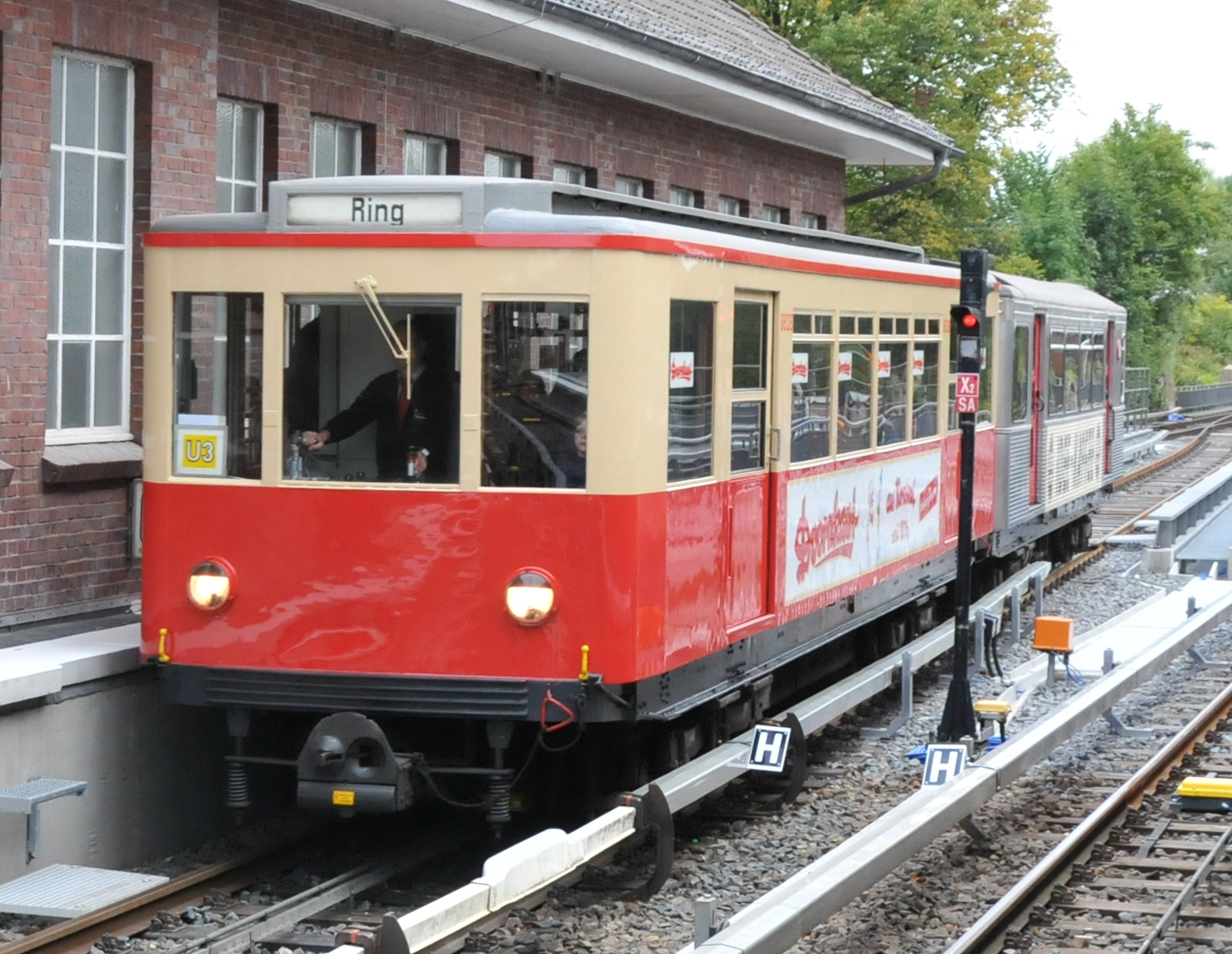
TU1 car 8838 in October 2012

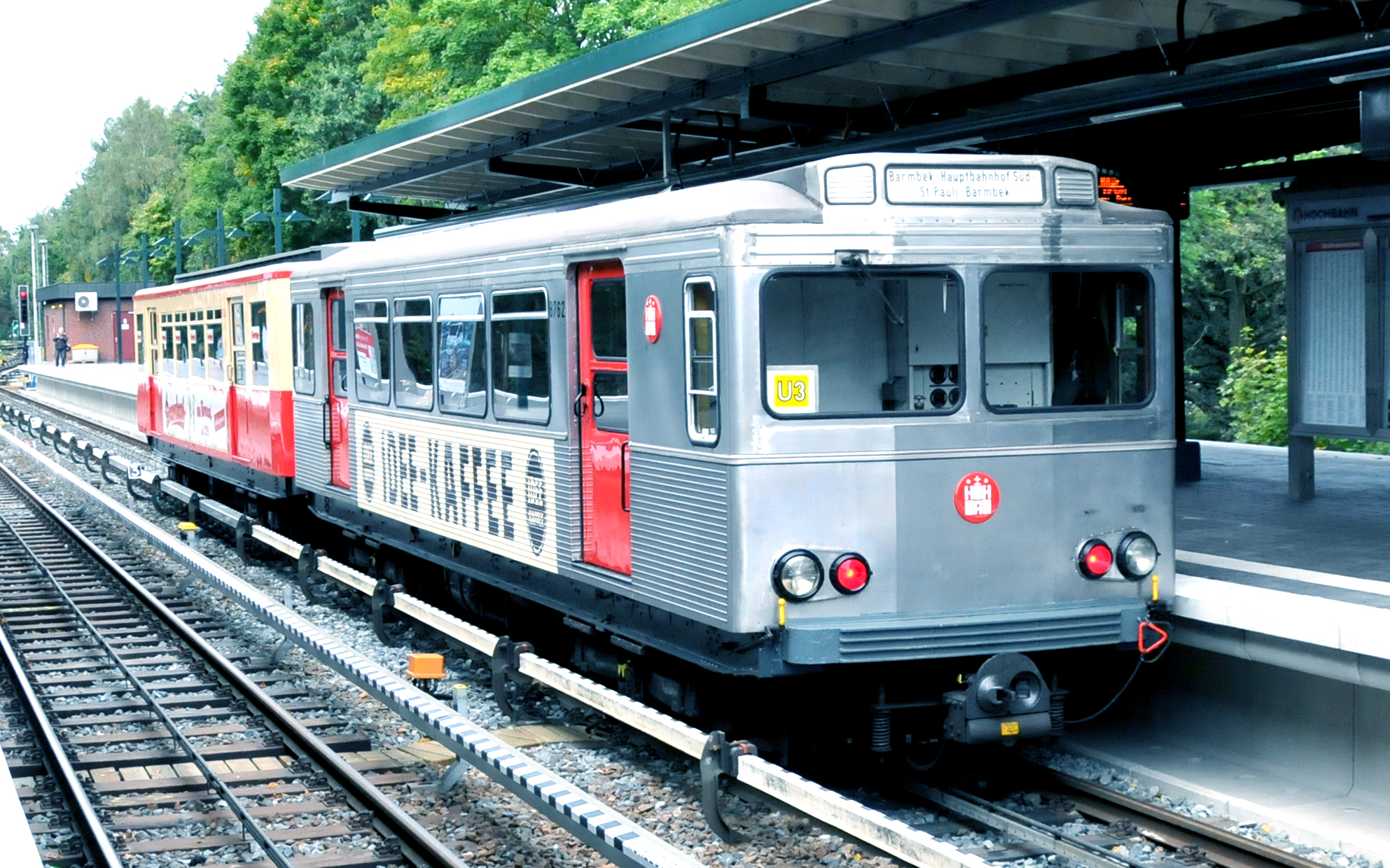
TU2 car 8762 in October 2012

== Preserved examples ==
- T1 car 11: built by Waggonfabrik Falkenried in 1911
- T1 car 18: built by Waggonfabrik Falkenried in 1911
- T1 car 8040 (formerly 177): built in 1914, later used as a track maintenance car
- T6 car 220: built by Waggonfabrik Falkenried in 1920
- TU1 car 8838: built by Siemens-Schuckert Werke and Waggonfabrik Gebr. Credé & Co. in 1927
- TU2 car 8762: built by AEG and Waggonfabrik Gebr. Credé & Co. in 1929
