= Hamburg U-Bahn Type DT2 =

German U-Bahn train type formerly operated in Hamburg

HHA-Baureihe DT2
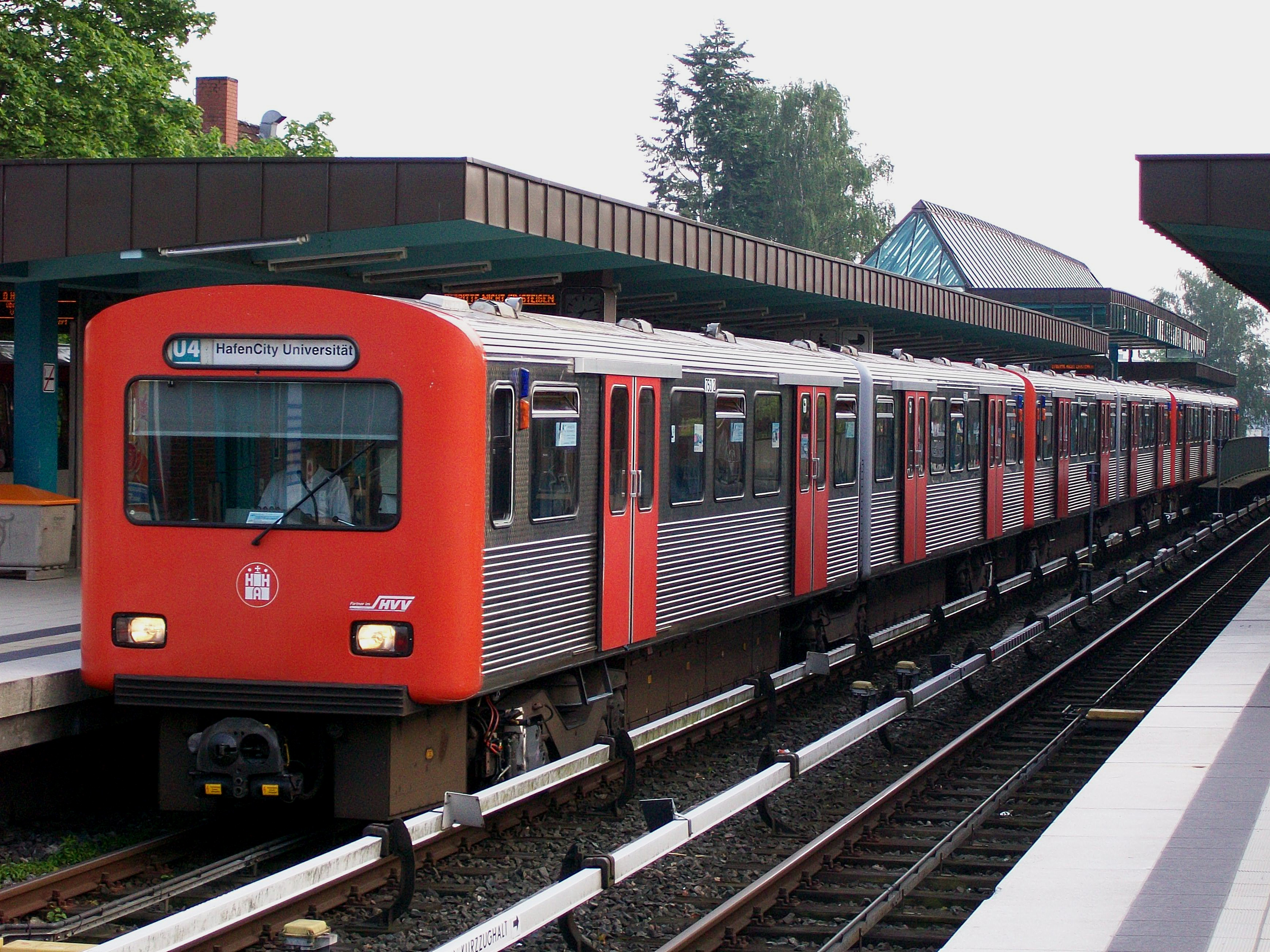
- DT2E at Farmsen station, displaying an U4 line destination
- In service: 1962–2015
- Manufacturer: Linke-Hofmann-Busch, Kiepe
- Constructed: 1960 (prototype); 1962–1966
- Entered service: 1962
- Refurbished: 1984–1992
- Scrapped: 1993, 2004–2006, 2016
- Number built: 186 units
- Number in service: None
- Number preserved: 1 unit
- Number scrapped: 182 units
- Fleet numbers: originally: 9100–9471 later: 601–791
- Capacity: 258 (82 seated)
- Operators: Hamburger Hochbahn AG
- Depots: Farmsen

Specifications
- Train length: 28.44 m (93 ft 4 in)
- Width: 2.51 m (8 ft 3 in)
- Height: 3.36 m (11 ft 0 in)
- Doors: 2 pairs per side (per car)
- Maximum speed: 70 km/h (43 mph)
- Weight: 35.6 t (35.0 long tons; 39.2 short tons)
- Power output: 320 kW (430 hp)
- Acceleration: 0.8 m/s²
- Deceleration: 1.25 m/s² (emergency)
- Electric system(s): 750 V DC third rail
- Current collector(s): Contact shoe
- UIC classification: Bo'1+1 Bo'; Bo'2'Bo'
- Braking system(s): Dynamic main brakes
- Safety system(s): Sifa
- Coupling system: Scharfenberg
- Track gauge: 1,435 mm (4 ft 8 1/2 in)

The Type DT2 is a two-car electric multiple unit (EMU) train type operated by the Hamburger Hochbahn AG on the Hamburg U-Bahn until 2015. They replaced the Type T and Type TU.

== Technical specifications ==
The first trains had a Bo'1+1 Bo' axle layout, with later trains built to an articulated design, formed as two-car sets. Up to four sets can be coupled together to form a 114 m (374 ft 0 in) long train. The car body was constructed using lightweight steel, based on a design licensed from the American Budd Company. They are equipped with Kiepe-build quill drives.

== Interior ==
Seating arrangement consists of seating bays in a 2+2 layout.

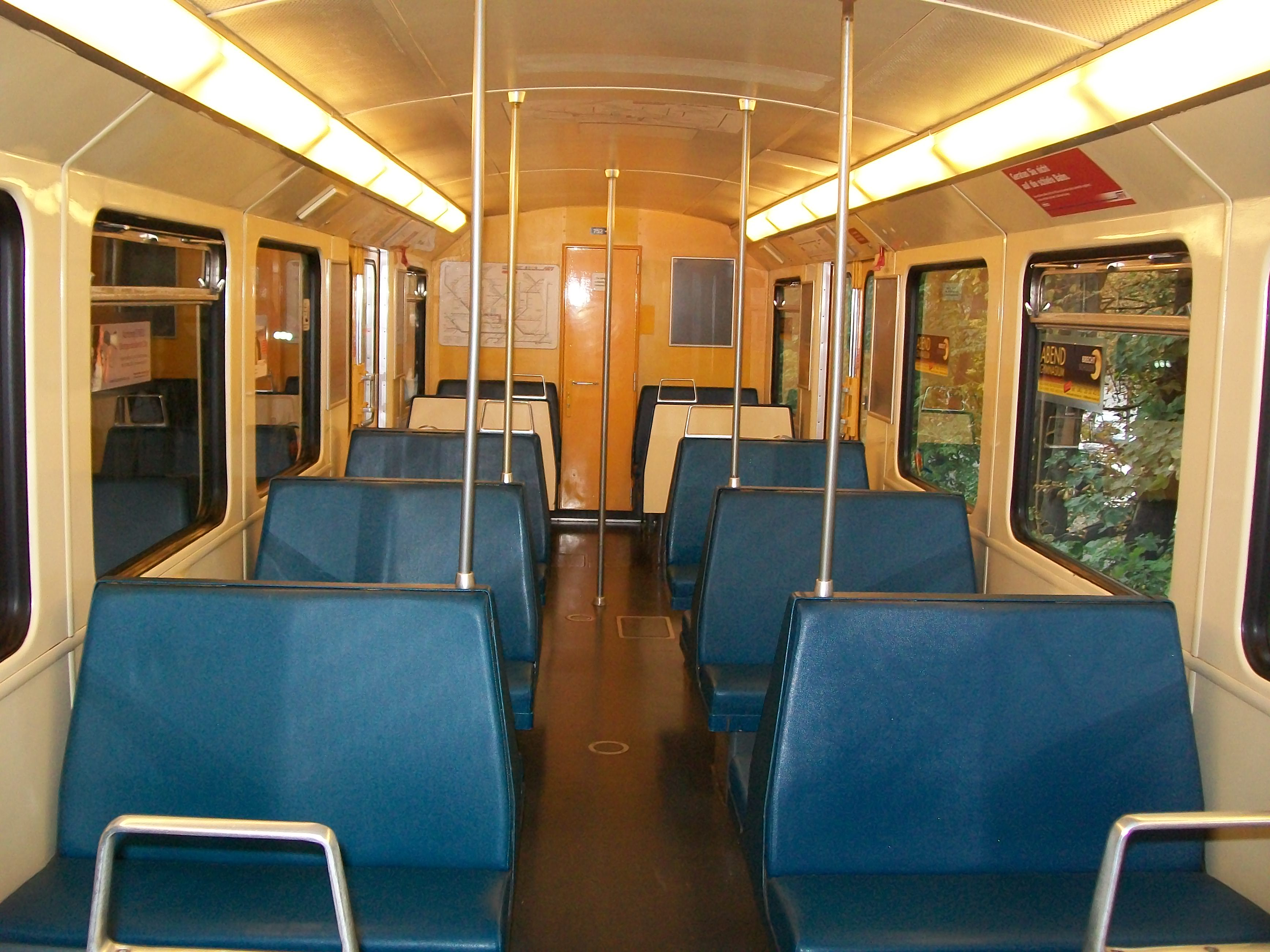
Interior of a refurbished "DT2E" unit

== History ==
A total of 186 sets were delivered in five batches between 1962 and 1966. They were withdrawn after farewell runs through the entire network on November 28, 2015.

=== Refurbishment ===
Some sets underwent refurbishment from 1985 to 1987, which included replacement of the old cab ends and addition of fire-resistant interior fittings. A microprocessor-controlled wheel slide protection system was also retrofitted. These rebuilt units were designated as DT2.5-E. As a result of the refurbishment the units could stay in service for another 20 years.

== Preserved examples ==
One unrefurbished unit, set 604, was taken out of service in 2002 is being preserved for a later use as a museum car. In 2013 it had to be partly cannibalized since it was the only option to get spare parts for the DT2E cars that were still in service then. Shortly before they were scrapped in 2016 all of these parts were taken from the DT2E again to allow a re-completion of set 604 as soon as its restoration begins.
