= 30 Odd Foot of Grunts =

Australian rock band

- Origin: Australia
- Genre: Rock
- Years active: 1992–2005
- Labels: Gruntland; Difrnt Music

30 Odd Foot of Grunts was an Australian rock group, formed in 1992. It was made up of singer Russell Crowe, guitarist Dean Cochran, Garth Adam on bass, Dave Kelly on drums, Dave Wilkins on guitar and vocal, and trumpeter Stewart Kirwan.

== Discography ==
=== Studio albums ===
List of albums, with selected chart positions
Title	Album details	Peak chart positions
Title	Album details	AUS
Gaslight	Released: 1998; Format: CD; Label: Gruntland (CD303)	—
Bastard Life or Clarity	Released: February 2001; Format: CD; Label: Gruntland (GRUNT005)	7
Other Ways of Speaking	Released: 2003; Format: CD, 2×CD; Label: Difrnt Music (DIF001)	—

=== Video albums ===
List of video albums, with selected chart positions
Title	Details	Peak chart positions
Title	Details	AUS video
Texas	Released: November 2002; Format: DVD; Label: Gruntland Films (TFGDVD01)	4

=== Charting singles ===
Images from July 1997 concert in Sydney, AU
TOFOG in concert, Sydney	Dean Cochran playing guitar with smoker shadow 30 Odd Foot of Grunts
Dave Kelly and Russell Crowe in concert 30 Odd Foot of Grunts	Dave Kelly drumming 30 Odd Foot of Grunts
Garth Adam singing with 30 Odd Foot of Grunts	
