= Path =

A path is a route for physical travel – see Trail.

Path or PATH may also refer to:

== Physical paths of different types ==
- Bicycle path
- Bridle path, used by people on horseback
- Course (navigation), the intended path of a vehicle
- Desire path, created by human or animal foot traffic
- Footpath, intended for use only by pedestrians
- Shared-use path, intended for multiple modes such as walking, bicycling, in-line skating or others
- Sidewalk, a paved path along the side of a road
- Hoggin, a buff-coloured gravel & clay pathway often seen in gardens of Stately Homes, Parks etc.
- Trail, an unpaved lane or road

== Mathematics, physics, and computing ==
- Path (computing), in file systems, the human-readable address of a resource
  - PATH (variable), in computing, a way to specify a list of directories containing executable programs
- Path (graph theory), a sequence of edges of a graph
  - st-connectivity problem, sometimes known as the "path problem"
- Path (topology), a continuous function
- Path (geometry), a curve
- Path, a name for the vectors in vector graphics
  - Clipping path, in digital image processing
- Path (physics), a trajectory

== Organizations ==
- PATH (global health organization), an international nonprofit organization in Seattle
- Partners for Advanced Transit and Highways, a research organization operated by the University of California
- PATH Foundation, a trail-building organization in Georgia, USA
- People's Alliance of Tower Hamlets, a minor political party in Tower Hamlets, London
- Professional Association of Therapeutic Horsemanship, a non-profit organization that promotes the benefits equine-assisted therapies
- Projects for Assistance in Transition from Homelessness, American formula grant program

== Media ==
- Golden Path (Dune), a metaphysical theme from Frank Herbert's Dune novels
- Path (album), by American shoegaze musician Kraus
- "Path Vol. 1 & 2", a 2000 single by Apocalyptica

== Places and transportation ==
- PATH (rail system), Port Authority Trans-Hudson, serving New York and New Jersey
- Path (Toronto), a network of underground pedestrian tunnels in Toronto, Ontario, Canada
- Potomac-Appalachian Transmission Highline, a proposed electrical line
- Train path, infrastructure capacity needed to run a train between two places over a given time-period

== Other uses ==
- Path (social network), a photo sharing and messaging service

== See also ==
- Control flow path, a possible execution sequence in a computer program
- Footpath (disambiguation)
- Pathé
- Pathway (disambiguation)
- Road (disambiguation)
- Route (disambiguation)
- The Path (disambiguation)
- Track (disambiguation)
- Trail (disambiguation)
