= Aurora (CityNightLine) =

Night train service in Europe

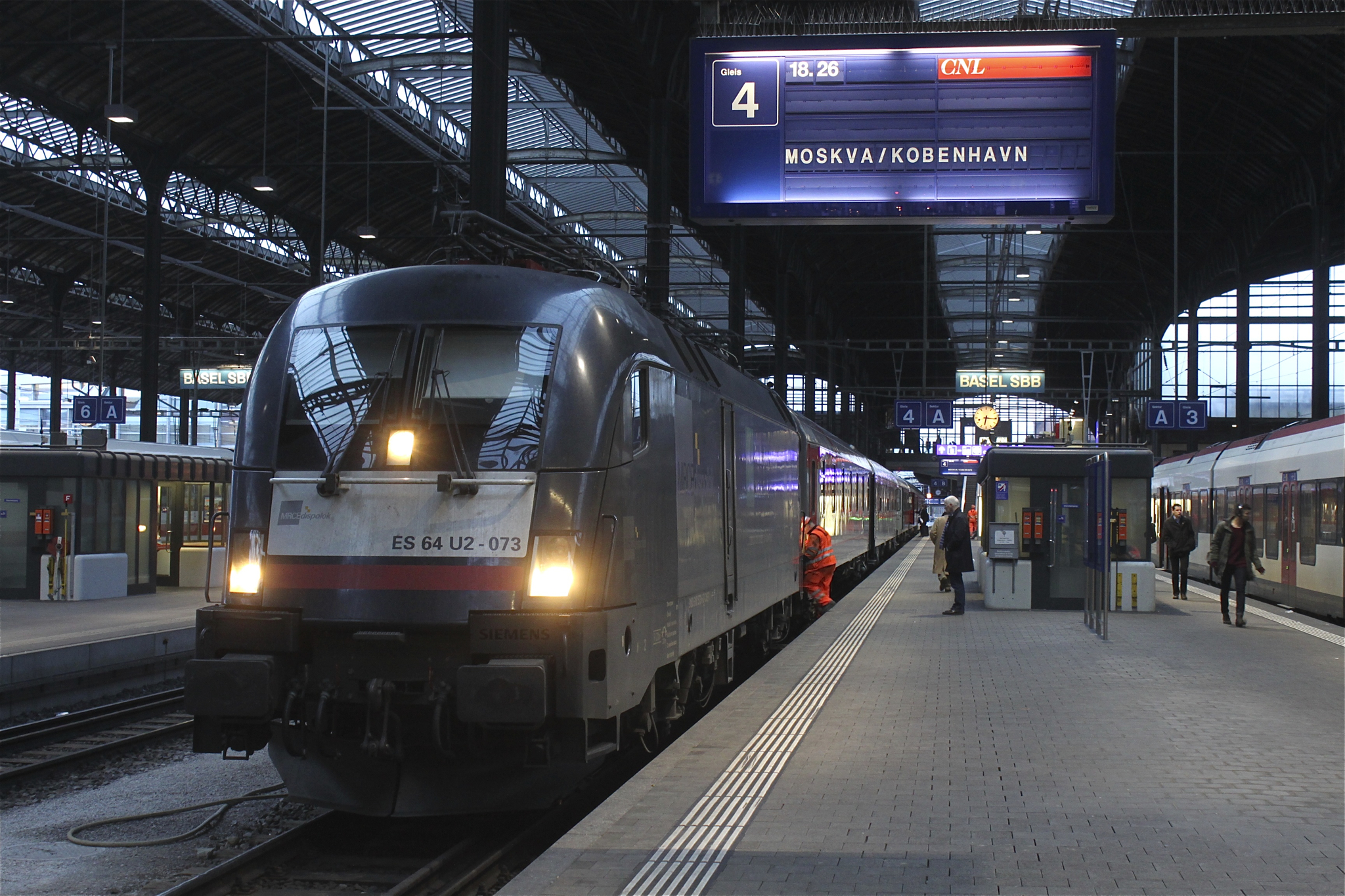
- CNL 472 Aurora leaving Basel SBB (2013)

Overview
- Service type: City Night Line (CNL)
- Locale: Switzerland, Germany, Denmark
- Former operator: CityNightLine

Route
- Termini: Basel SBB; Copenhagen Central
- Stops: Basel Bad^{(CH/DE border)}; Freiburg Hbf; Offenburg; Karlsruhe Hbf; Mannheim Hbf; Frankfurt (Main) Süd; Fulda; [Hannover Hbf]^{(shunting)}; Neumünster; Flensburg; Padborg^{(DE/DK border)}; Kolding; Odense; Ringsted; Roskilde

Technical
- Track gauge: 1,435 mm (4 ft 8 1/2 in)
- Electrification: 15 kV 16.7 Hz (Germany & Switzerland); 25 kV 50 Hz (Denmark)

Aurora was the name given to Basel‒Copenhagen night train services operating as part of the CityNightLine network until 2014. In 2011 Aurora still carried the through sleeping cars bound to and from Moscow. In July 2025, the Swiss Federal Office of Transport (FOT) and Swiss Federal Railways (SBB) had announced a plan to reintroduce the night trains on the route from April 2026. but the expensive plan was cancelled end of 2025. As of 2026, there is no direct train between Basel and Copenhagen; the easiest train connection remains with a change in Hamburg, e.g. using the ÖBB Nightjet trains between Hamburg and Zürich (470/471).

== CityNightLine ==
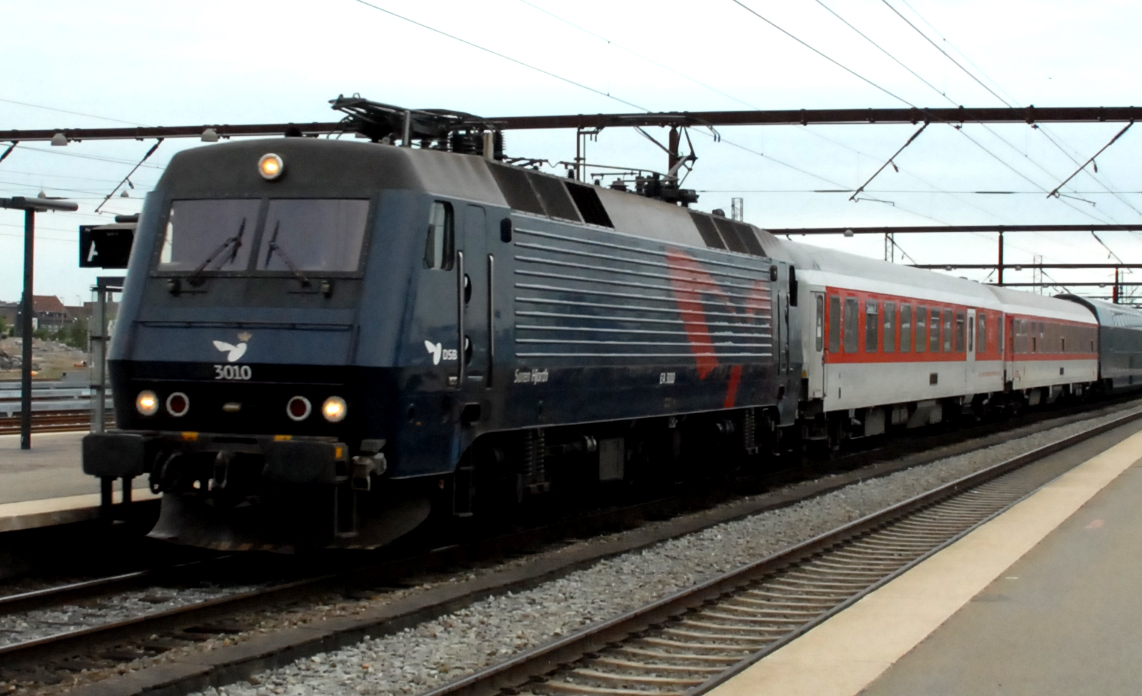
CNL 472 Aurora arriving in Denmark (2009)

Southbound the Aurora train used to depart Copenhagen at 18:10 in the evening with a locomotive change at Padborg, and then a non-advertised shunting stop at Hannover between 02:13 and 02:51 for coupling and uncoupling the parts of the train connecting to Amsterdam, Berlin, and Prague. Northbound the Aurora would stop for shunting in Hannover between 02:03 and 02:36, then again for 25 minutes to change locomotives at Padborg, arriving Copenhagen at 10:07 in the morning.

== Cancelled reintroduction ==
As of March 2025, Swiss Federal Railways were planning to restart night train services from Switzerland to Copenhagen and Malmö—within one year. The train would start running from spring 2026, after a gap of over 10 years since the CityNightLine route stopped in 2014, and with a distance of 1,300–1,400 kilometres (800–900 mi) become the longest passenger train operating from Switzerland.

The restored night train service from Basel to Copenhagen/Malmö would be operated together with Railroad Development Corporation (RDC)—already operators of the overnight Motorail services between Lörrach and Hamburg. Comfort level would likely be similar to the SJ Euronight Berlin‒Stockholm, operated on a similar basis, with sleeping cars, couchettes, and seats. The SJ Euronight and SBB services will use separate fleets of carriages. RDC would also provide train crew. Inside Germany the service would be routed to run through Baden-Württemberg, including a stop at Freiburg Hauptbahnhof.

The route would require approval from national authorities in Denmark, Switzerland, and Germany, as well as funding commitments. Rolling stock would be transferred from the existing Amsterdam‒Zürich night train route—after the introduction of new Austrian Railways (ÖBB) Nightjet 2.0 trains on the Amsterdam‒Zürich route. SBB had already been leasing the same night carriages from RDC for the Amsterdam route between December 2021 and December 2024/2025.

=== Funding ===
Euronight Basel‒CPH‒Malmö
Year	Funding (Swiss francs)
2025	1,200,000(development)
2026	8,900,000(~~planned~~)
2027	10,000,000(~~planned~~)
2028	9,600,000(~~planned~~)
2029	9,100,000(~~planned~~)
2030	8,300,000(~~planned~~)

Swiss Federal Railways (SBB) started to sell train tickets via their App, with dynamic pricing based on occupancy and travel category. As of May 2025 an application had been made to the Swiss government for Swiss CO_{2} Act funding to support the service.

In July 2025 the Swiss Federal Office of Transport allocated multi-year funding for the Basel‒Copenhagen‒Malmö Euronight route for the period 2025‒2030, up to CHF 47 million. The overnight train would run six nights a week from April 2026: three times per week northbound, and three times per week southbound. The allocated funding was planned to consist of CHF 1.2 million in development funding in 2025, followed by planned Swiss CO_{2} Act investment of up to CHF 10 million per year until 2030.

The allocation of the assigned funding budget was subject to confirmation by the Swiss Federal Government during mid-December 2025.

=== Timetable ===
The draft-2026 Swiss railway timetable number 499 for the Basel Connecting Line—published in August 2025—included provisional train paths for a re-introduced night train service running from April 2026-onwards:

- train 472 (northbound), departures would be on Wednesday/Friday/Sunday evenings from Switzerland, leaving Basel SBB railway station at 17:35 and arriving into Malmö Central Station at 09:35.
- train 473 (southbound), the train would leave Scandinavia on Thursday/Saturday/Monday evenings—departing Malmö Central at 18:57, returning to Switzerland on Friday/Sunday/Tuesday mornings—arriving into Basel SBB at 11:30.

After leaving Basel, station stops would be Freiburg (Breisgau) Hbf, Karlsruhe Hbf, Mannheim Hbf, Frankfurt (Main) South, Hamburg Hbf, Padborg railway station, Kolding railway station, Odense railway station, Høje Taastrup, Copenhagen Airport railway station and Malmö Central Station.

During September 2025, part of the planned route had been briefly visible in the Swiss Federal Railways (SBB) journey planner.

=== Cancellation ===
In December 2025, the Swiss Federal Assembly voted, and scrapped the allocation of funding to the Basel‒Malmö night train service.
