= Allegro Tosca =

Train

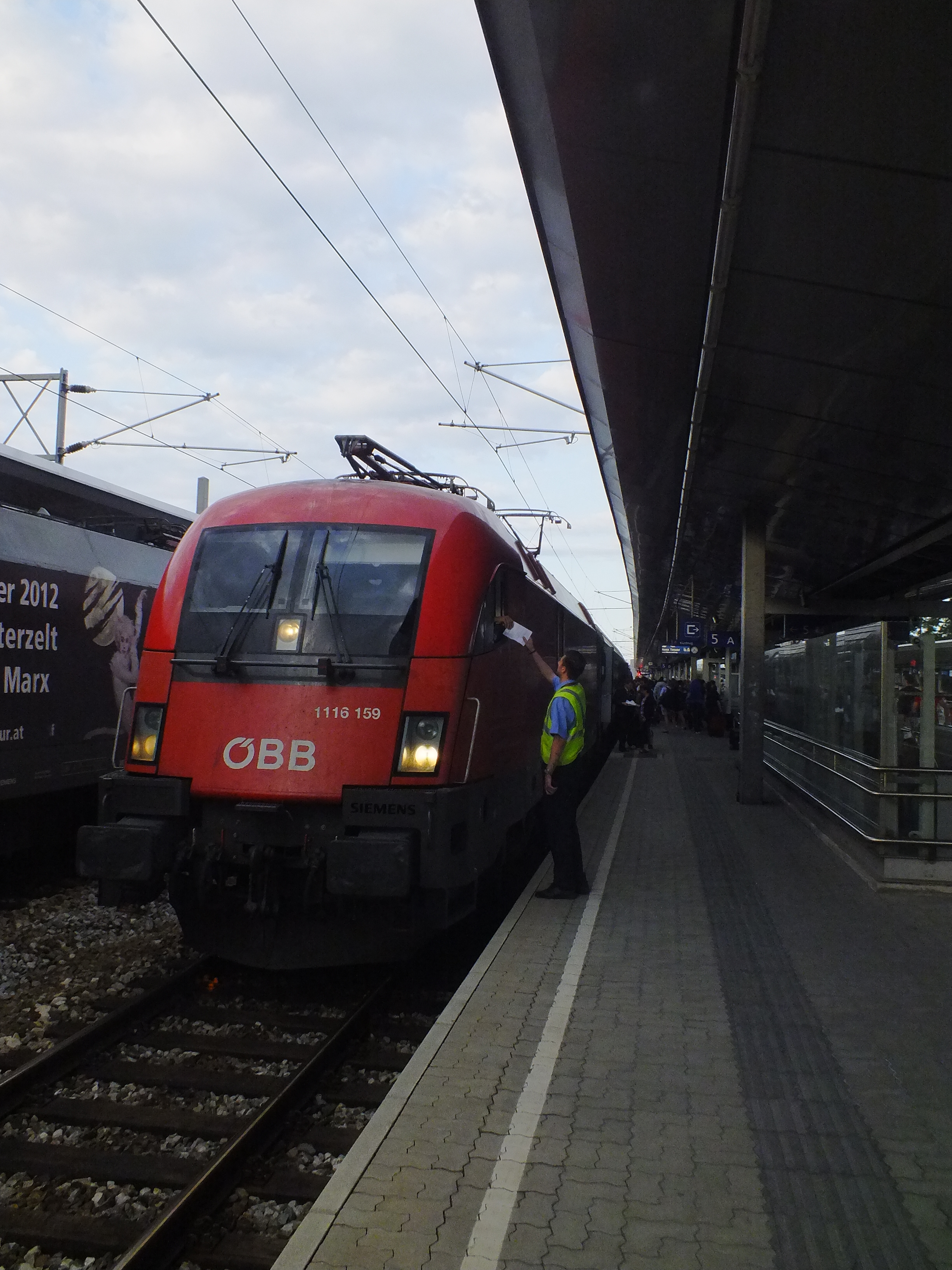
- EuroNight 235/9702, the "Allegro Tosca" waits to depart Vienna Meidling station.

Overview
- Status: Operating
- Locale: East Austria, north Italy
- First service: 1993
- Current operator(s): ÖBB EuroNight

Route
- Termini: Wien Hauptbahnhof, Vienna; Roma Termini, Rome; Milano Centrale, Milan
- Distance travelled: 1,203 km (748 mi) (Vienna-Rome); 879 km (546 mi) (Vienna-Milan)
- Average journey time: 8h42m (Vienna-Rome); 8h2m (Vienna-Milan)
- Service frequency: Daily
- Train number(s): EN235 (Vienna-Rome); EN234 (Rome-Vienna); ESI9702 (Venezia-Milan); ESI9753 (Milan-Venezia)

Technical
- Track gauge: 1,435 mm (4 ft 8 1/2 in)
- Track owner(s): Austrian Federal Railways (Vienna-Tarvisio); Trenitalia (Tarvisio-Rome), (Venezia-Milan)

The EN 234/235, until 2013 named Allegro Tosca, is an overnight train jointly operated by the Austrian Federal Railways and Trenitalia under the EuroNight brand. It runs 1,203 km (748 mi) from Wien Hbf in Vienna to Roma Termini in Rome, with thru-cars to Milano Centrale in Milan.

== Route ==
The Allegro Tosco starts its southwest-bound journey during the evening at Wien Hbf station in Vienna, then after a few minutes the train makes its first stop at Wien Meidling. The train heads southwest through Vienna's suburbs at high speeds, along the main line of the Vienna S-Bahn, until it makes its second stop at Wiener Neustadt. After Wiener Neustadt, the train leaves the metropolitan landscape and heads into the mountains of the Eastern Alps. After passing the town of Payerbach the Allegro Tosca decreases its speed as it starts to climb up several hundred feet winding its way through the mountainous terrain. Once it reaches about 914 m (2,999 ft), the train reaches a small valley with relatively flat terrain allowing slightly higher speeds. The Allegro Tosca passes through small towns and villages until it reaches Bruck an der Mur, making a short stop. It continues via Villach Hauptbahnhof and Tarvisio border station on the Pontebbana line.

At Venezia Mestre, the train is split up, with a section continuing after a waiting time towards Milano Centrale. The main section of the train continues towards Bologna Centrale where it is coupled together with the City Night Line Lupus from München Hauptbahnhof. The train terminates at Roma Termini station.

Since December 2013, this train lost name.

== Train compositions ==
The train is composed of one or two sleeping cars type MUn with compartments of up to three berths and one deluxe compartment with private bathroom, couchette cars with six berth compartments and coaches with six seat compartments that can also be used for morning or evening travel within Austria. The sleeping-car to Milano is a rebuilt T2S type with two-berth compartments and two deluxe compartments. On certain days in summer, the train carries autoracks from Wien Hauptbahnhof to Verona Porta Nuova. All rolling stock belongs to the Austrian Federal Railways.
