= Pathway =

Pathway or pathways may refer to:

== Music ==
- The Pathway (album), a 2001 album by Officium Triste
- Pathway (album), by the Flaming Stars
- Pathways (album) (2010), by the Dave Holland Octet
- Pathways (band), an American progressive metalcore band

== Publications ==
- Pathway (comics), a superhero featured in Marvel comics
- The Pathway (novel), a 1914 work by Gertrude Page

== Medicine and Cell Biology ==
- Clinical pathway, systemised approach to medical treatment
- Biological pathway
  - Genetic pathway, a group of interacting genes
  - Metabolic pathway, a series of cellular chemical reactions
  - Neural pathway
  - Signalling pathway or signal transduction, a series of interactions to affect gene expression

== Organizations ==
- Pathways Foundation, an Australian non-profit organisation
- Pathways out of Poverty, a workforce programme in the U.S.

== Schools ==
- Pathway Academy, a charter school in Jacksonville, Florida
- Pathways Academy, Detroit school serving students who are pregnant or new mothers, closed
- The Pathway School, a high school in Rengkai, Churachandpur, Manipur.

== Other uses ==
- Pathway (video game), a tactical role playing video game developed by Robotality and published by Chucklefish
- Pathways (game), an online educational game about the Prevent strategy developed by Shout Out UK
- NHS Pathways, triage software used by the National Health Service of the United Kingdom
- Pathway Intermediates Limited, company producing biosurfactants
- Pathway Studios, a North London recording studio
- Pathway Commons, a database of biological pathways and interactions
- Pathways Thesauri, finding aids for the Australian Institute of Aboriginal and Torres Strait Islander Studies online catalogue

== See also ==
- Path (disambiguation)
- Career Pathways, a workforce development strategy
