= Trent Wind Farm =

Coordinates: 32.4219932°N 100.212307°W

The Trent Wind Farm, also known as the Trent Mesa Wind Project, is a 150 megawatt wind power station located between Abilene and Sweetwater in West Texas. The wind farm consists of 100 GE wind turbines each rated at 1.5 megawatts. American Electric Power owns the Trent Wind Farm and TXU Energy purchases the electricity produced under a long-term agreement.

The Trent Wind Farm began commercial operation in 2001, when it was the fourth largest wind farm operating in the United States.

== See also ==
- Wind power in the United States
- Wind power in Texas
