= Route =

Route or routes may refer to:

- Air route, route structure or airway
- Climbing route, path of ascent in rock climbing
- GPS route, a series of one or more GPS waypoints
- Route (gridiron football), a path run by a receiver
- Route (command), a program used to configure the routing table
- Route, County Antrim, an area in Northern Ireland
- Routes, Seine-Maritime, a commune in Seine-Maritime, France
- Routes, a 2003 video game by Leaf

== See also ==
- Acronyms and abbreviations in avionics
- Path (disambiguation)
- Rout, a disorderly retreat of military units from the field of battle
- Route number or road number
- Router (disambiguation)
- Router (woodworking)
- Routing (disambiguation)
- The Route (disambiguation)
- Routing table
- Scenic route, a thoroughfare designated as scenic based on the scenery through which it passes
- Trade route, a commonly used path for the passage of goods
