= Forwarding =

Forwarding may refer to:

== Computing and technology ==
- Call forwarding, a telephony feature that allows calls to one phone number to be forwarded to another number
  - Remote call forwarding, a telephony feature that allows call forwarding to be activated remotely
- Cisco Express Forwarding, an advanced layer 3 switching technology used mainly on the enterprise core network or the Internet
- Mail forwarding, a service that redirects mail from one address to another
  - Email forwarding, the re-sending of an email message onward to another email address
- Operand forwarding in an instruction pipeline
- Packet forwarding, the relaying of packets from one network segment to another by nodes in a computer network
  - Forwarding equivalence class, a set of packets with similar or identical characteristics that may be forwarded the same way
- Perfect forwarding, a feature of the programming language C++11
- Port forwarding, the act of forwarding a network port from one network node to another
- Reverse-path forwarding, a technique used in routers for ensuring loop-free forwarding of packets in multicast routing and to help prevent IP address spoofing in unicast routing
- URL redirection, also called URL forwarding, domain redirection and domain forwarding, a technique that forwards web page visitors to another page

== Other uses ==
- Freight forwarding, a service by which a freight forwarder dispatches shipments via common carriers
- Timber forwarding, the transport of logs from the stump to the forest road
- Repossession Forwarding is a service provided to automotive finance lenders to assist them in managing the repossession process.

== See also ==
- Routing (disambiguation)
