= Through coach =

Passenger coach that starts on one train, and ends on another

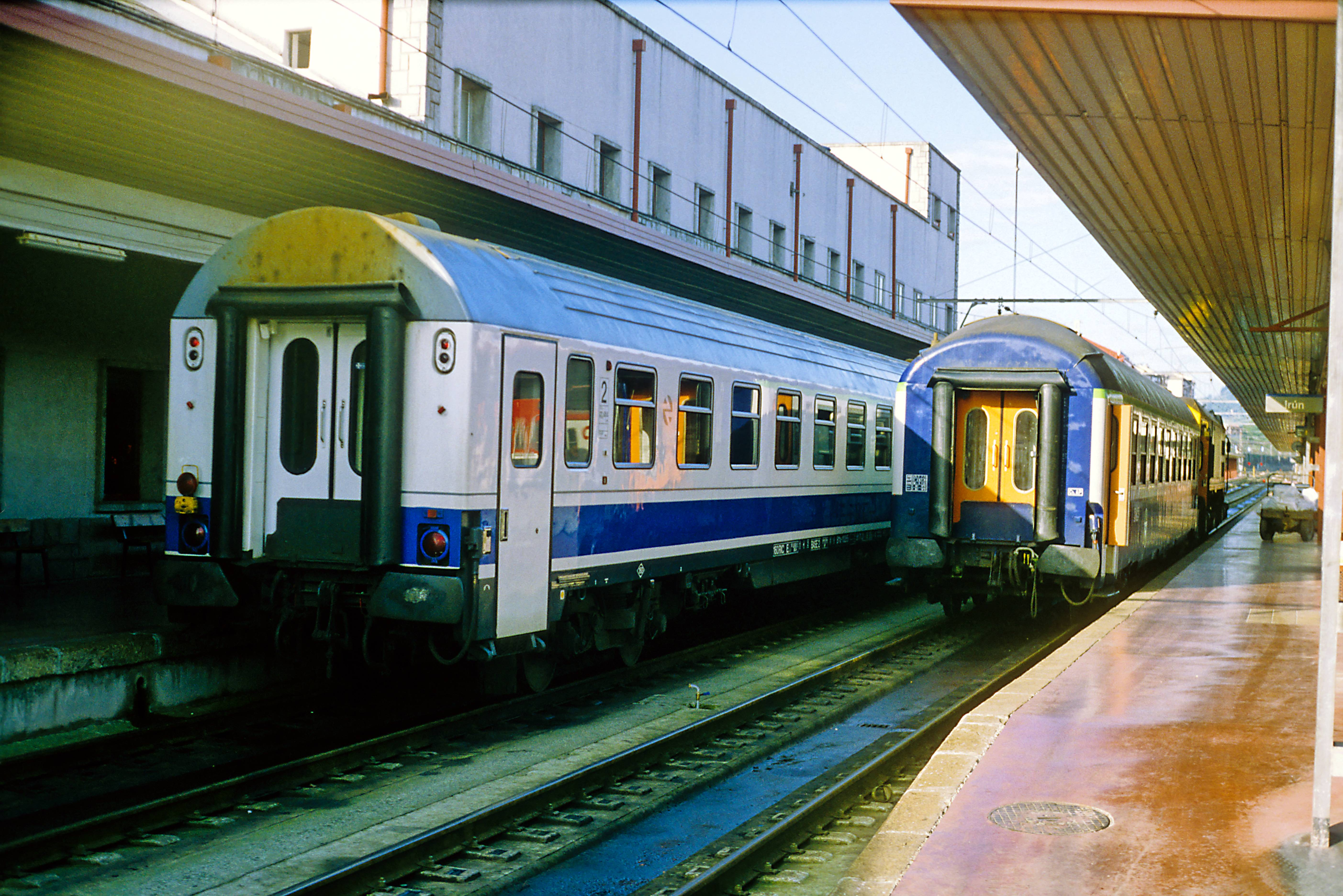
A Paris–Algeciras through coach (at right) being shunted for bogie exchange at Irun railway station, Spain, 1993.

In rail terminology, a through coach is a passenger car (coach) that is re-marshalled during the course of its journey. It begins the journey attached to one train, and arrives at its destination attached to another train.

Through coaches save their transit passengers the need to change trains themselves. They also increase the number of direct links offered by the train operator(s).

Most frequently in the form of sleeping or couchette cars, through coaches have commonly been used for long-distance journeys, especially in continental Europe, although they are much less common now than they were in the early 1970s.

== International ==
In 2010 and 2011, the through Basel – Moscow sleeping car (2,856 km or 1,775 mi in 37 hours and 11 minutes) was attached successively to the following trains:

- from Basel SBB to Hannover Hbf: CNL 472 Aurora Basel SBB – Copenhagen;
- from Hannover Hbf to Warszawa Wschodnia: EN 447 Amsterdam – Warszawa Wschodnia;
- from Warszawa Wschodnia to Brest: Train 405 Bohumin – Brest
  - bogie exchange at the international border because of a break of gauge from 1,435 mm (4 ft 8 1/2 in) standard gauge to 1,520 mm (4 ft 11 27/32 in) gauge
- from Brest to Moscow: Train D 22 Brest – Moscow.

== Germany ==
For nearly 100 years, from 1926‒2025 through carriages have connected the main cities of Berlin, Frankfurt and Cologne, via Niebüll station and the Niebüll–Dagebüll branch line, run by the Norddeutsche Eisenbahngesellschaft Niebüll, to the Dagebüll for direct transfer via ferry to the islands of Föhr and Amrum.

The last through carriage from Berlin to Dagebüll Mole ran in July 2025.

== See also ==
- Dividing train
- Express train
- Interchange (freight rail)
- Slip coach
- Section (rail transport)
