= City Night Line =

Former German train category

Overview
- Service type: Sleeper train
- Predecessor: CityNightLine
- First service: 1995; 31 years ago (CityNightLine); 1998; 28 years ago (DB NachtZug)
- Last service: 2016; 10 years ago
- Successor: Nightjet
- Current operator: DB Fernverkehr

City Night Line, abbreviated CNL, was a train category of German railway company Deutsche Bahn for overnight passenger train services between Germany and neighbouring European countries. In late 2015, Deutsche Bahn announced that it planned to terminate all night train services in December 2016, and this plan was implemented on 11 December 2016. The service on some CNL routes was replaced by ÖBB's Nightjet services.

== History ==
=== Early years ===
In 1998, Deutsche Bahn hived off its night train services, which were provided with the train categories EN (EuroNight) and UEx (Urlaubsexpress), from DB Fernverkehr AG to DB AutoZug GmbH. One year later, the CityNightLine AG company, domiciled in Zurich and until then a joint venture operated by Deutsche Bahn and the state-owned railways of Austria and Switzerland, ÖBB and SBB, became a wholly owned subsidiary of DB Fernverkehr AG. It was run by the same management team as DB Autozug GmbH, so that responsibility for all night train categories, which still form the core element of the City Night Line network, lay with one single source from then on. The management of services, rolling stock and pricing of CityNightLine and its then DB counterpart (NachtZug), however, remained separate.

=== Redevelopment of services ===
Parallel to the integration of the two companies, the DB Autozug GmbH night trains were renamed DB NachtZug. On introduction of the new timetable on 15 December 2002, the DB Nachtzug portfolio was increased to 20 trains. Following the emergence of low-cost airlines and the expansion of the international high-speed rail network, DB realised it had to adapt its night train services to the changing requirements of the transport market. The target was to establish overnight services as a supplementary product to high-speed trains over long distances (between 800 and 1500 km). To achieve that objective, the existing train categories CityNightLine (CNL), DB NachtZug (NZ) and UrlaubsExpress (UEx) were amalgamated to form one new product called City Night Line (CNL), which was integrated in the fare systems and sales processes of the different departure countries. The line network was then redesigned to reflect these new objectives: routes which ran parallel to long-distance services were discontinued, other routes were systematically extended, destinations with strong seasonal fluctuations and tourist destinations were replaced by daytime services. In the course of this bundling process, older passenger cars were taken out of service. Since then, the entire fleet of sleeping, couchette and seated cars has been fully air-conditioned. The cars were given a uniform livery in white with red window stripe and all-white doors. The service was standardised on all lines.

The night lines were originally operated by the former railway company CityNightLine. Like DB AutoZug GmbH, the company was a wholly owned subsidiary of Deutsche Bahn and was integrated in the DB Group as from 1 January 2010 in the form of an asset deal.

=== Demise ===
At the end of 2014, all City Night Line trains to Denmark and France (Paris) were terminated, as well as some of the lines to the Netherlands (Amsterdam). At the end of 2015, the domestic night trains between Munich and Berlin were also terminated.

In December 2015, Deutsche Bahn decided to cancel all remaining night train services including City Night Line, effective December 2016. Deutsche Bahn plans to run some additional ICE highspeed train services with standard seating by night as a replacement and will also continue to cooperate with foreign train companies that operate night trains to Germany, for example ÖBB.

In October 2016, DB and ÖBB announced that the Austrian railway company will inaugurate six new night train services under their ÖBB nightjet brand by 10 December 2016 of which several will run through Germany, partially on identical routes as the German night trains before. ÖBB also took over some of DB's former night train cars.

== Rolling stock ==
City Night Line trains were made up of compartment or open-saloon coaches with reclining seats, couchette cars, sleeping cars and dining cars. All lines had a special compartment for passengers with restricted mobility. To facilitate the carriage of luggage, either combined couchette and luggage cars were used or seated cars with a special luggage/bicycle compartment. New sleeping cars were designed specially for City Night Line and 2 different types are currently in use: the double-deck sleeping car (type 171.X and 172.X) and Comfortline (type 173.1). The cars were air-conditioned and each compartment has two or three berths. Deluxe cars had a private bathroom (shower, washbasin and WC). There was otherwise a washbasin in each compartment; shower and WC are in the aisle. Laptop connections were only available in the newer Comfortline cars. The compartments had "normal" beds.

=== Sleeping cars ===
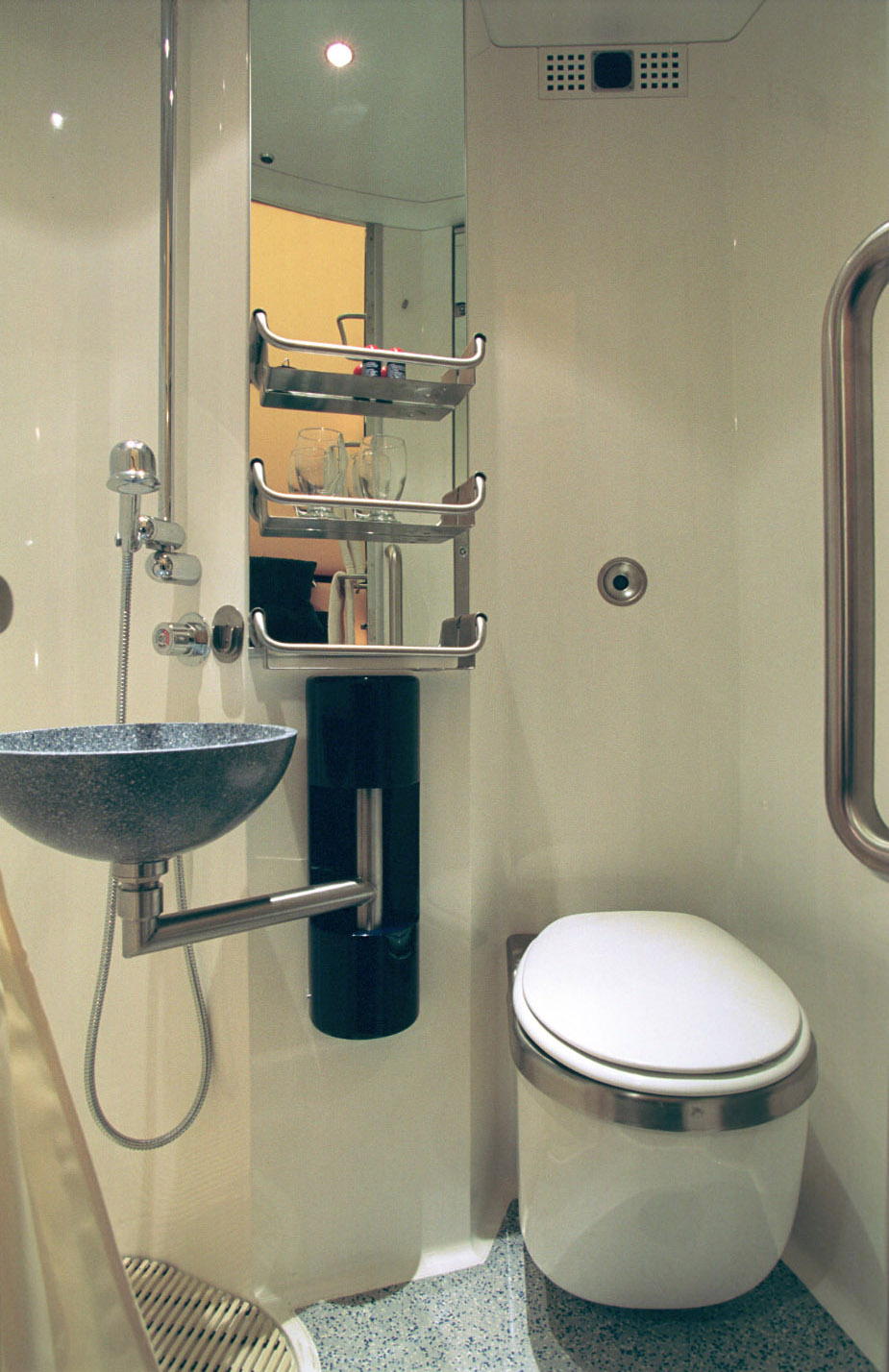
Bathroom in sleeping car (Comfortline Deluxe)

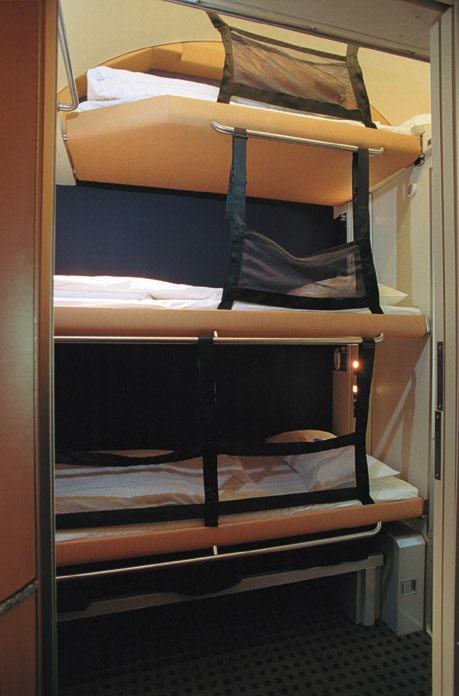
Beds in a sleeping car (with child's safety device)

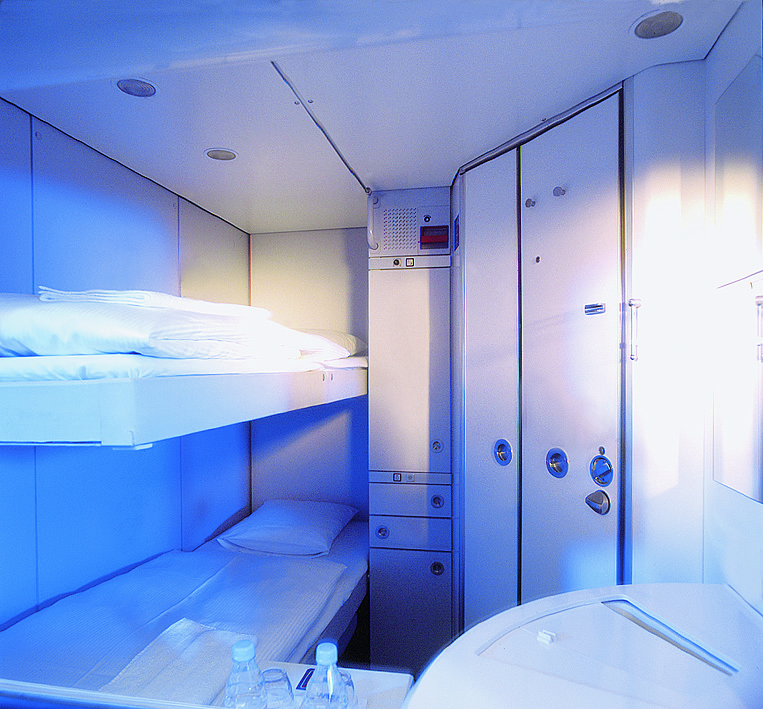
Beds in a sleeping car (double-deck Eco)

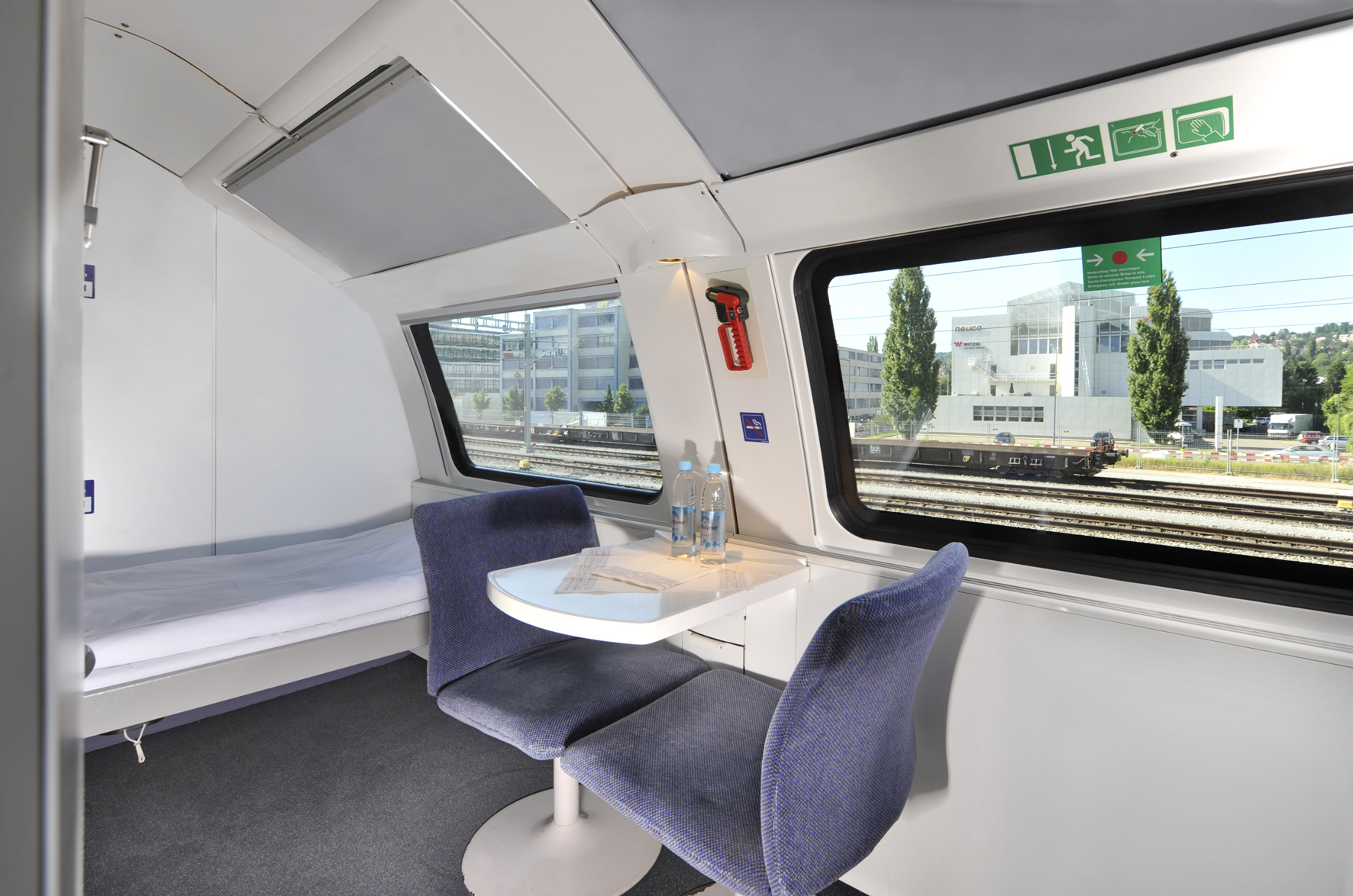
Beds in a sleeping car (double-deck Deluxe)

=== Couchette cars ===
The couchette and seated cars were converted from existing Deutsche Bundesbahn and Deutsche Reichsbahn coaches. Couchette cars had 4 or 6 berths and there are three different categories in use, which differ in respect of their additional functions:

- Couchette car (type 248.5)
- Couchette car with compartment for passengers with restricted mobility (type 249.1)
- Combined luggage and couchette car (type 874.1)
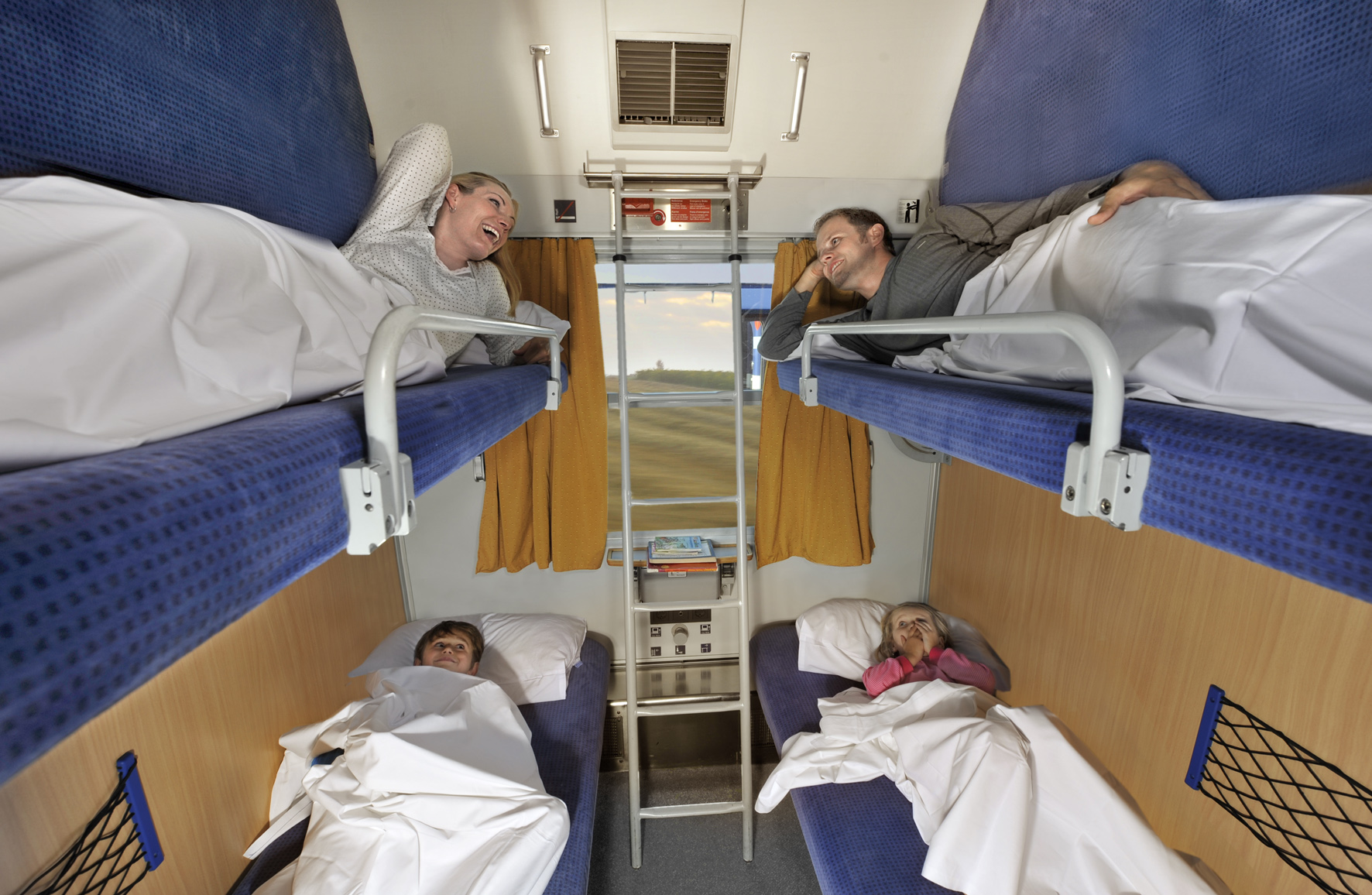
Couchette cars (4 berth)

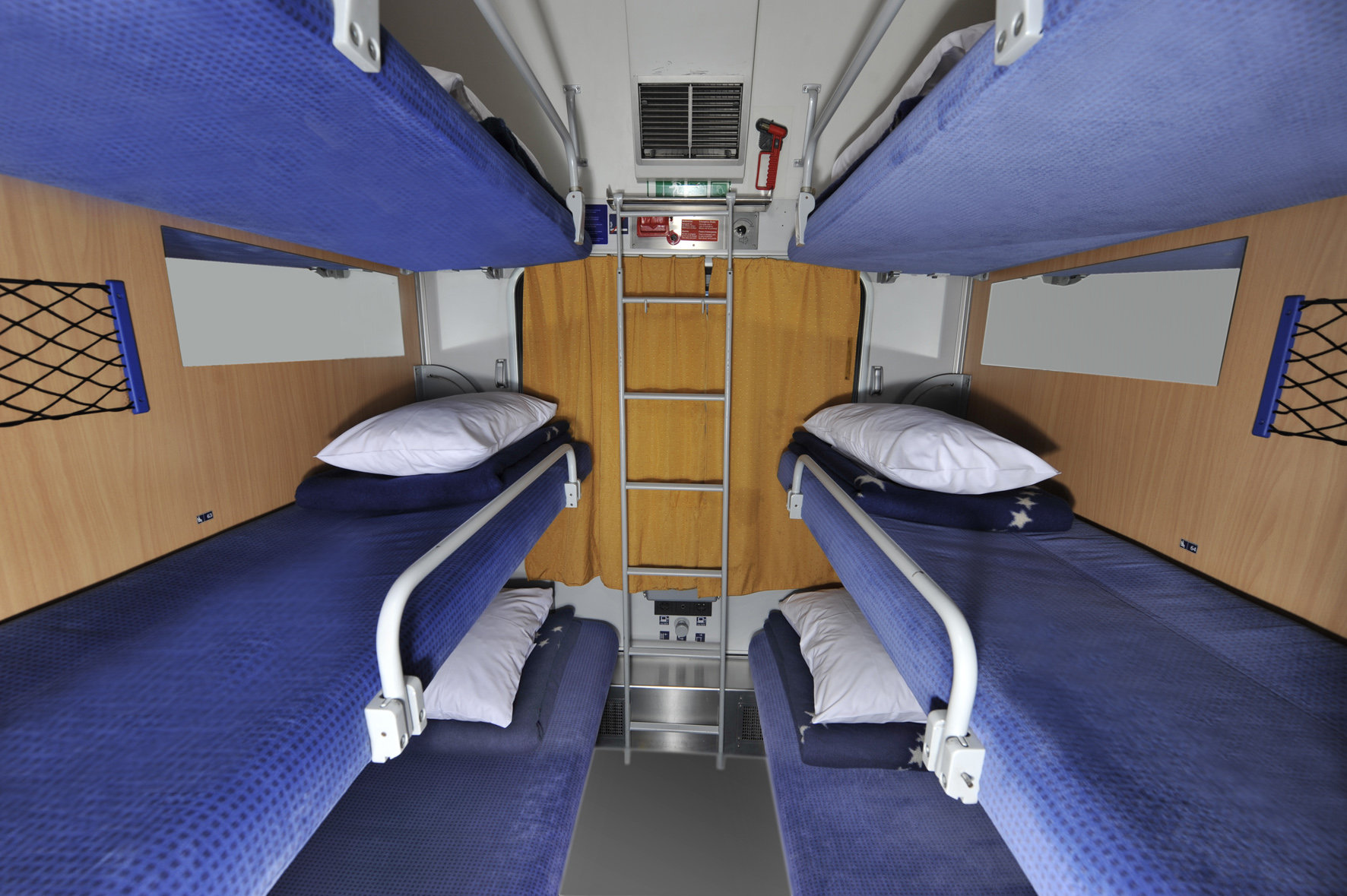
Couchette cars (6 berth)

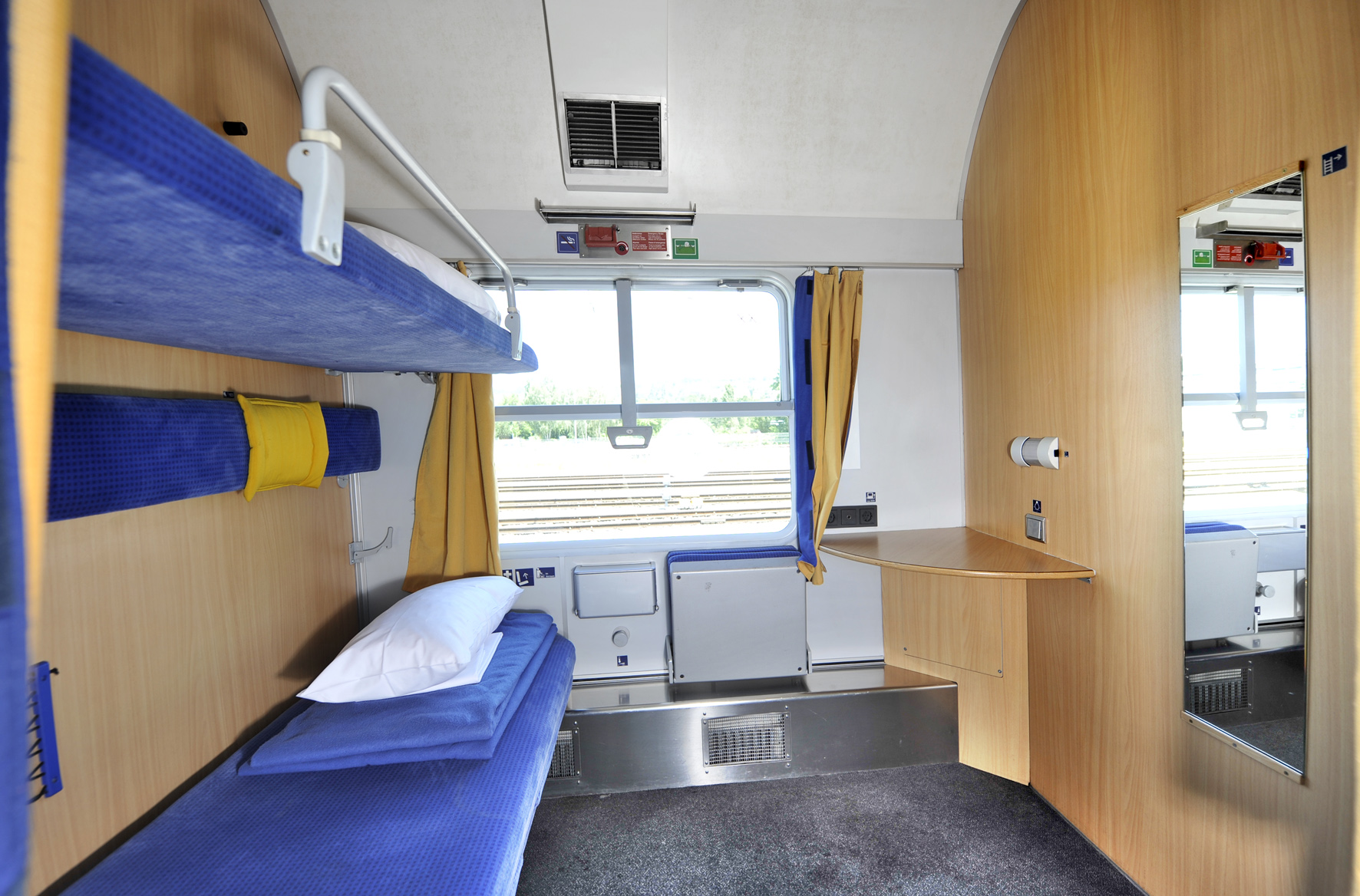
Compartment for passengers with restricted mobility

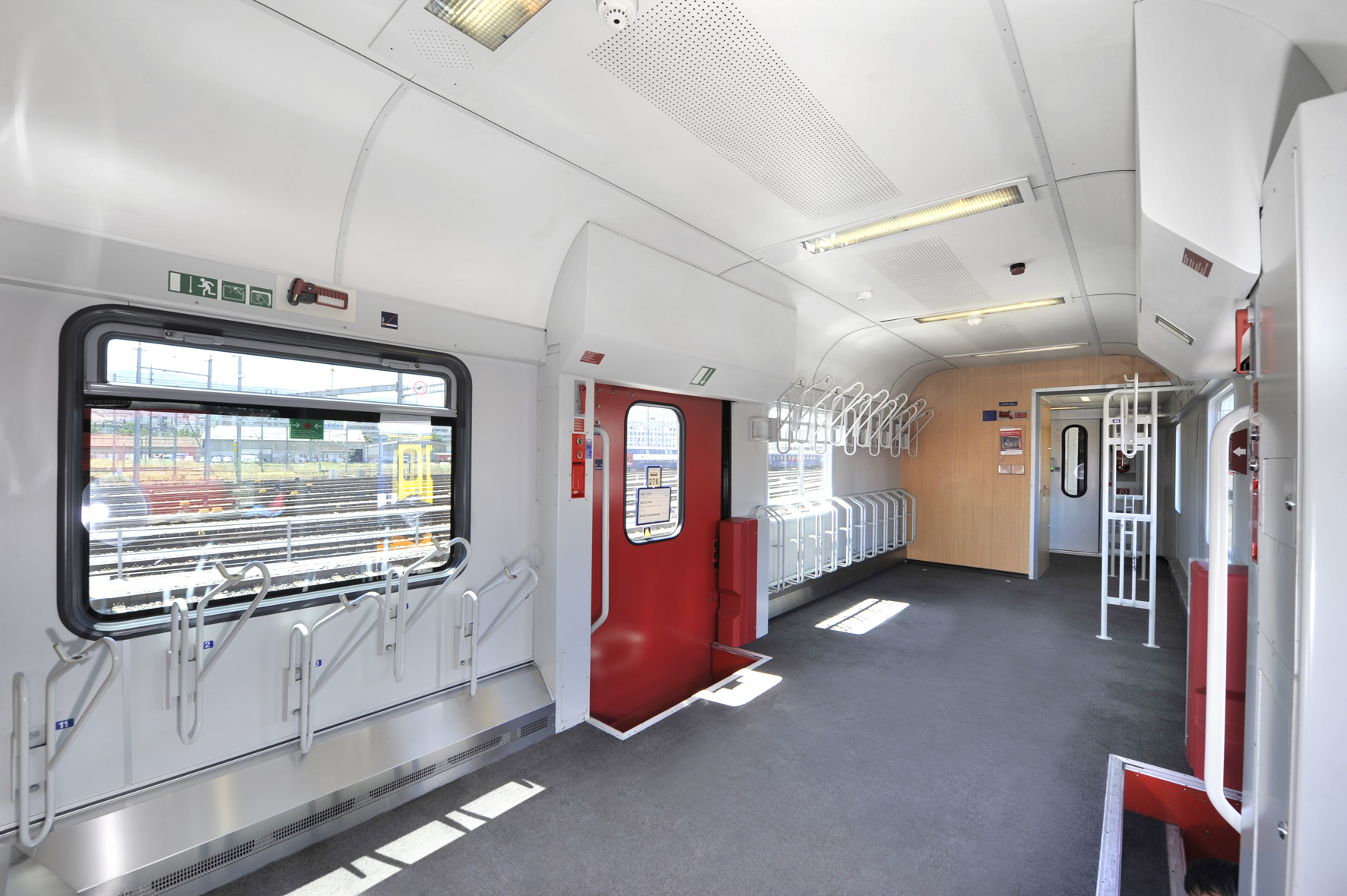
Compartment for bikes, ski etc.

=== Seated cars ===
The seated cars consist of compartment cars (six seats per compartment; type 236.9) and open-saloon cars with reclining seats (types 875.X)

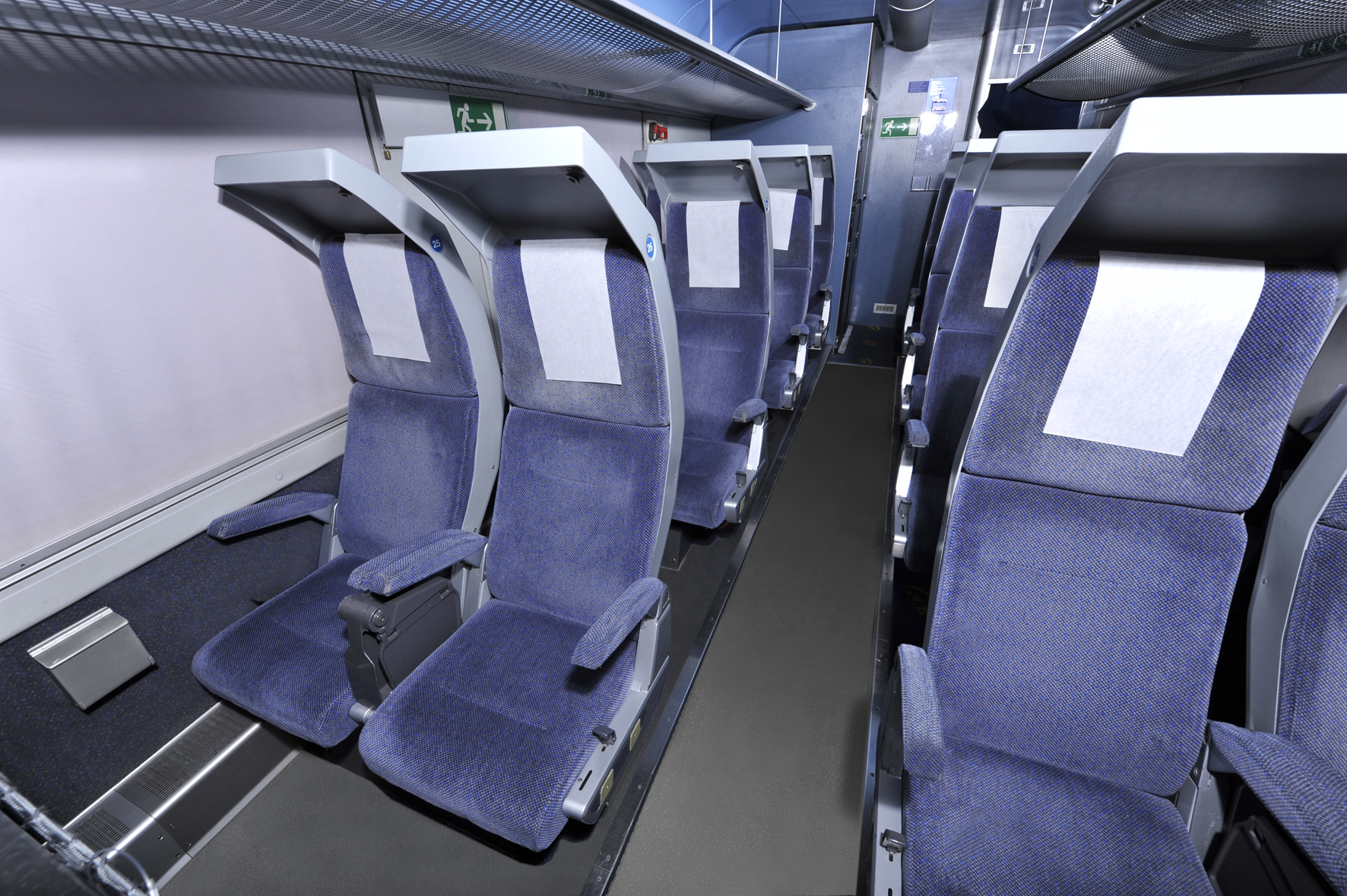
Reclining seats

== Operations ==
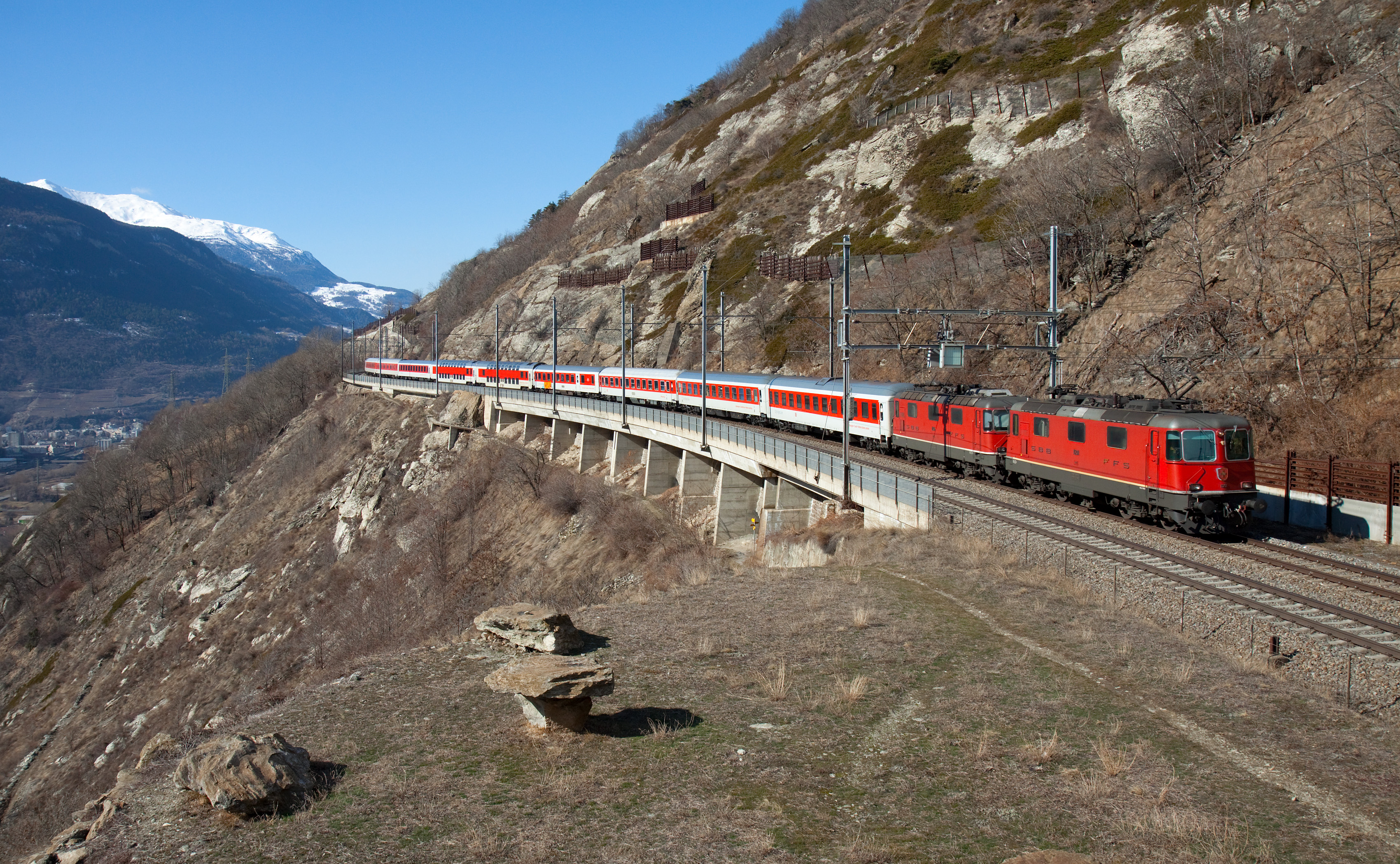
Former City Night Line train from Amsterdam and Hamburg shortly before arriving at the winter terminus of Brig, Switzerland

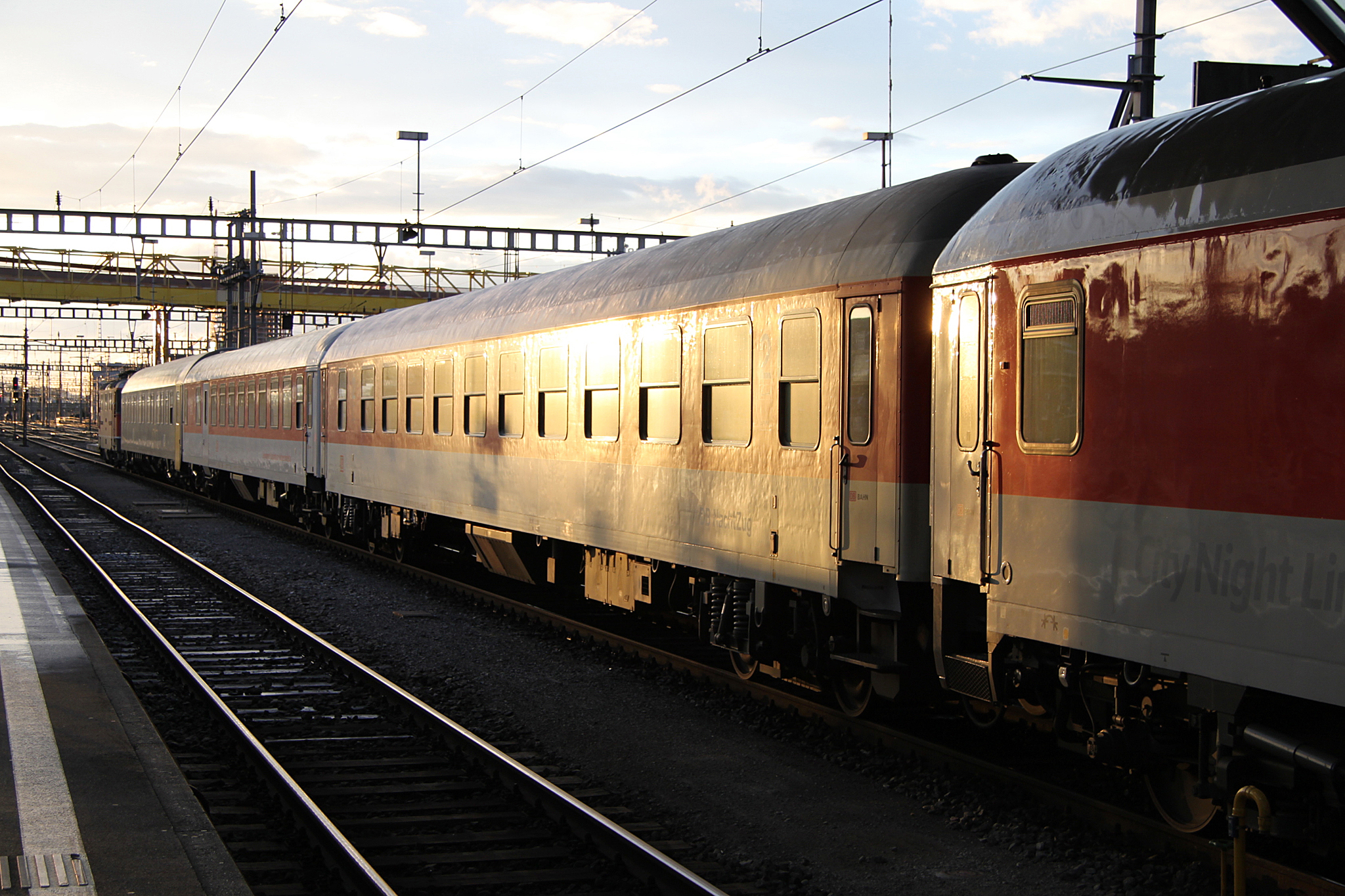
Former City Night Line Canopus to Prague in Zürich, Switzerland

The aim of the City Night Line network was to supplement the European long-distance network on long routes. Journey times of six hours or more were shifted to night-time slots so that passengers can sleep as they travel without losing unnecessary time.

City Night Line trains were operated in a through coach system. From their joint departure station, they covered part of the route together as one train; on arrival at a certain station, they were split up and joined to other trains, with which they then continued to the different destination stations. The same procedure applied on the return journey. For example, the trains on the Amsterdam – Munich and Amsterdam - Zurich routes ran as a joint train as far as Mannheim, where the train was split up. The train section travelling to Munich was joined to a train coming from Paris with destination Munich, while the section travelling to Zurich was joined to a CNL coming from Hamburg. On the changeover to the 2009/2010 timetable, the number of these shunting processes was reduced to one per network.

=== Last schedule ===
The last City Night Line schedule, valid from December 2015 to December 2016, consisted of the following services:

Train number	Train name	Route
CNL 1287/1286	Pyxis	Hamburg–Munich–(Innsbruck)
CNL 40463/40462	Pictor	Munich–Venice
CNL 419/418	Pollux	Amsterdam–Munich–(Innsbruck)
CNL 40419/40478	Pegasus	Amsterdam–Zürich
CNL 1259/1258	Sirius	(Binz)–Berlin–Zürich
CNL 458/459	Canopus	Prague–Zürich
CNL 479/478	Komet	Hamburg–Zürich
CNL 485/484	Lupus	Munich–Rome
CNL 40485/40484	Apus	Munich–Milan
CNL 457/456	Kopernikus	Cologne–Prague

In 2014 these trains were also going:

Train number	Train name	Route
CNL 40447/40473	Borealis	Amsterdam – Cologne – Copenhagen
CNL 450/451	Perseus	Paris – Berlin
CNL 40418/40451	Cassiopeia	(Innsbruck –) Munich – Paris
CNL 473/472	Aurora	Copenhagen – Basel
CNL 40479/50451	Andromeda	Hamburg – Paris
CNL 50456/50473	Orion	Prague – Copenhagen

== Fares and prices ==
=== Germany ===
Fares for CNL services were allocated to the IC/EC Product Category (formerly Product Category B), the second-highest in the three DB passenger transport categories. All saver fares for long-distance services and the corresponding discount options (such as BahnCard) could have also been used on City Night Line routes.

The special offers for long-distance services which have meanwhile been introduced (such as the Lidl-Ticket or Tchibo-Ticket) were normally valid, but not always on all City Night Line routes. Passengers had to check the conditions of the individual offer.

Tickets could have been purchased a maximum of three months before the first day of validity. Tickets for group travel can be purchased up to twelve months in advance, provided that the relevant timetable has already been published. In addition to the train ticket, passengers also have to make a reservation (see above for exceptions). The reservation is simultaneously valid as the charge for the additional night-time services and the prices vary according to comfort category.

=== Other countries ===
Netherlands

In the Netherlands, City Night Line tickets were generally sold as a global fare, like the fares which apply to transit routes in Germany. Passengers who already had a rail ticket (e.g., Interrail passengers) can purchase reservations separately.

Austria

Like the Netherlands

Switzerland

Like Germany. In view of the high share of transit traffic, i.e., passengers heading to the Netherlands, Czech Republic or Denmark, there was a high share of global fare tickets.

Italy

The principle was similar to that in France, but with a few special national features.

== See also ==
- Train categories in Europe
