= Dolet Hills Power Station =

Coordinates: 32°1′56″N 93°34′10″W

Dolet Hills Power Station is a coal-fired power plant that was closed at the end of 2021. The plant had previously been proposed for a 2026 closure. The plant was operated by SWEPCO, a division of AEP, and Cleco Power LLC and is located in DeSoto Parish, Louisiana.

The closure of the plant was in part due to Sierra Club action that sought to prevent further mining of lignite coal as a fuel and a settlement agreement concluded in December 2019. The plant is the 300th coal plant to retire as part of the Sierra Club's Beyond Coal campaign. It is estimated that the closure will save customers 60 million dollars a year in electric costs in the region when replaced with renewables.
