= Router =

Router may refer to:

- Router (computing), a computer networking device
- Router (woodworking), a rotating cutting tool
- Router plane, a woodworking hand plane
- Journey planner, a specialized search engine for optimal routes between locations
- Michael Router (born 1965), Catholic bishop in Ireland
- The Routers, 1960s American instrumental group

== See also ==
- Rooter (disambiguation)
- Route (disambiguation)
- Routing (disambiguation)
