= Interchange (freight rail) =

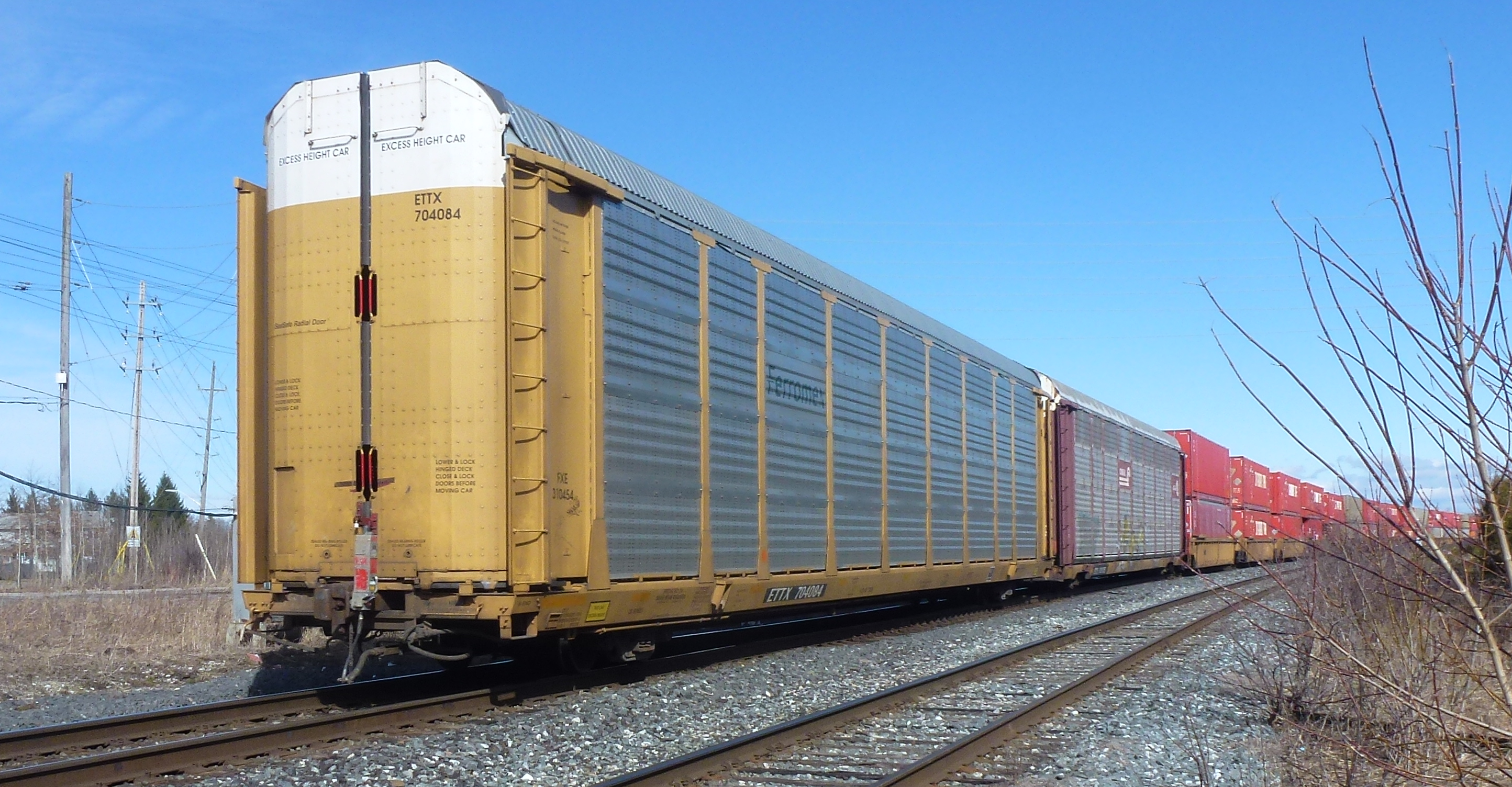
Interchange is sometimes international. Here a Ferromex car, based in Mexico, is seen in a Canadian Pacific train in Bolton, Ontario, Canada.

In freight rail transport, interchange is the practice of railroads conveying freight cars ("foreign" cars) from other companies over their lines. This benefits shippers, whose cargo might otherwise have to be transhipped if the point of origin and destination are not both served by the same company.

In passenger rail transport the term through car or through coach is used to denote a passenger car which is conveyed from one train to another, even within the same system.

Interchange is sometimes equivalent to the practice of demurrage.

== See also ==
- Dividing train
- Portion working
