= Donald C. Cook Nuclear Plant =

Nuclear power plant in Bridgman, Michigan

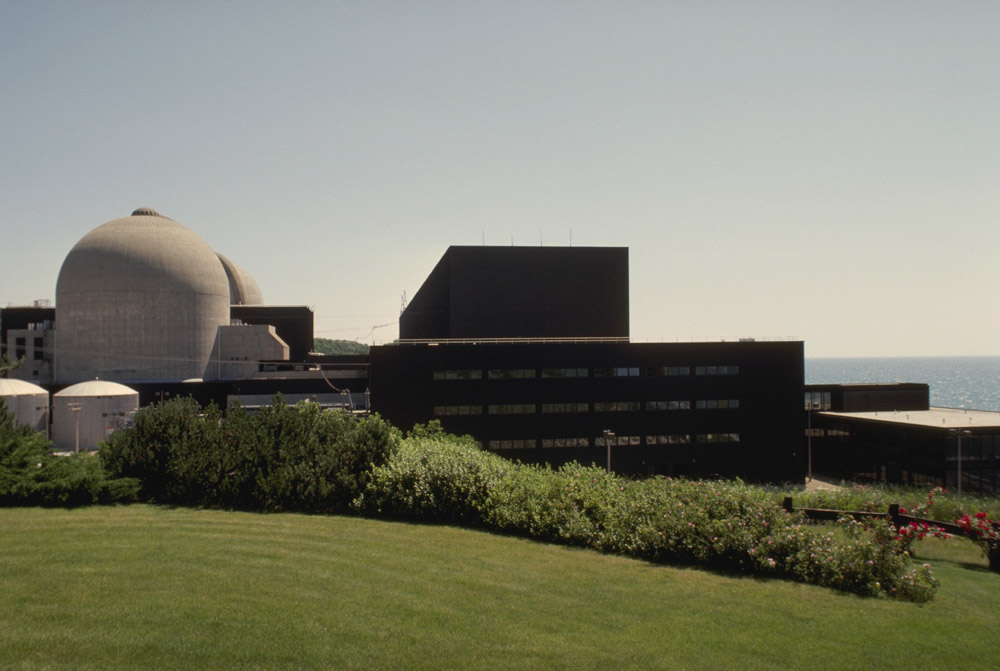
- Plant as seen from visitors section looking towards Unit 1 and the steam turbine building.
- Country: United States
- Location: Lake Township, Berrien County, near Bridgman, Michigan
- Coordinates: 41°58′32″N 86°33′55″W
- Status: Operational
- Construction began: March 25, 1969
- Commission date: Unit 1: August 28, 1975; Unit 2: July 1, 1978
- Construction cost: $3.352 billion (2007 USD)
- Owner: American Electric Power
- Operator: Indiana Michigan Power

Nuclear power station
- Reactor type: PWR
- Reactor supplier: Westinghouse
- Cooling source: Lake Michigan
- Thermal capacity: 1 × 3304 MW_{th} 1 × 3468 MW_{th}

Power generation
- Units operational: 1 × 1030 MW; 1 × 1168 MW
- Make and model: WH 4-loop (ICECDN)
- Nameplate capacity: 2198 MW
- Capacity factor: 90.75% (2017); 69.90% (lifetime)
- Annual net output: 17,953 GWh (2021)

External links
- Website: Cook Nuclear Plant (plant website); Cook Nuclear Plant (IMP page)
- Commons: Related media on Commons

Donald C. Cook Nuclear Plant is a nuclear power plant located just north of the city of Bridgman, Michigan which is part of Berrien County, on a 650-acre (260 ha) site 11 miles south of St. Joseph, Michigan, United States. The plant is owned by American Electric Power (AEP) and operated by Indiana Michigan Power, an AEP subsidiary. It has two nuclear reactors and is currently the company's only nuclear power plant.

The construction cost of the power plant was $3.352 billion (2007 USD). The plant is capable of producing 2.2 GW of electricity, enough to meet the needs of 1.25 million people, and actual production averages about 1.6 GW.

The plant is connected to the power grid via one 765 kV line that goes from the plant to AEP's DuMont substation near Lakeville, Indiana and by numerous 345 kV lines, two of which interconnect with METC, connecting with the Palisades Nuclear Generating Station, owned by Holtec International.

== License expiration and renewal ==
The US Nuclear Regulatory Commission renewed the operating licenses of both reactors on August 30, 2005. With the renewal, Unit One's operating license will expire in 2034 while Unit Two's will expire in 2037. The units were initially licensed for forty years from their operational date.

== Electricity production ==
Donald C. Cook generated 17,953 GWh in 2021.

Generation (MWh) of Donald C. Cook Nuclear Plant
Year	Jan	Feb	Mar	Apr	May	Jun	Jul	Aug	Sep	Oct	Nov	Dec	Annual (Total)
2001	1,393,943	1,303,796	1,534,739	1,490,105	1,560,999	1,463,499	1,417,982	1,330,691	6,821	1,235,222	1,488,958	1,597,552	15,824,307
2002	1,167,290	695,071	1,522,222	1,469,190	596,703	1,066,701	1,354,047	1,447,552	1,474,853	1,554,710	1,517,887	1,562,297	15,428,523
2003	1,069,728	1,055,888	1,590,347	1,179,481	61,859	943,960	1,556,300	1,114,527	1,523,405	1,237,973	833,018	1,516,770	13,683,256
2004	1,503,522	1,500,821	1,487,251	1,136,748	1,586,127	1,514,819	1,535,744	1,544,700	1,510,810	777,901	1,061,924	1,609,559	16,769,926
2005	1,552,286	1,454,410	1,443,672	860,613	1,583,840	1,464,620	1,535,292	1,535,658	1,414,533	1,581,049	1,441,522	1,603,888	17,471,383
2006	1,604,110	1,445,388	1,380,587	743,842	1,387,073	1,520,382	1,496,692	1,453,352	1,006,586	822,079	1,183,827	1,641,000	15,684,918
2007	1,641,706	1,480,252	1,637,337	1,572,364	1,600,872	1,524,334	1,542,872	1,504,545	1,071,913	780,852	1,375,467	1,644,642	17,377,156
2008	1,624,620	1,426,242	1,446,495	800,379	1,576,397	1,524,392	1,545,774	1,399,867	1,260,149	811,883	797,760	822,328	15,036,286
2009	818,864	744,726	615,838	0	635,802	791,142	660,359	580,326	770,762	817,172	799,674	1,091,726	8,326,391
2010	1,596,276	1,439,754	849,774	1,294,540	1,412,456	1,495,430	1,525,132	1,532,604	1,502,274	874,108	728,352	1,395,355	15,646,055
2011	1,598,138	1,425,218	1,428,185	1,544,848	1,591,060	1,523,302	1,552,328	1,540,854	1,160,312	920,396	1,500,922	1,572,674	17,358,237
2012	1,647,396	1,535,264	1,319,849	816,273	1,562,809	1,541,860	1,528,340	1,536,096	1,509,394	1,574,498	1,508,656	1,638,774	17,719,209
2013	1,652,982	1,492,610	1,489,442	811,197	1,097,356	1,556,374	1,500,903	1,566,534	1,499,799	794,732	1,201,696	1,616,540	16,280,165
2014	1,648,704	1,479,874	1,630,482	1,568,924	1,613,245	1,532,622	1,519,112	1,558,137	1,288,774	984,776	1,156,949	1,649,193	17,630,792
2015	1,644,083	1,491,480	1,428,961	824,804	1,600,116	797,019	855,871	1,536,900	1,516,418	1,624,130	1,553,464	811,474	15,684,720
2016	1,654,236	1,547,486	1,382,822	842,300	1,618,722	1,538,035	1,280,391	1,531,445	1,520,332	861,068	771,196	811,730	15,359,763
2017	1,574,389	1,550,962	1,714,802	1,645,244	1,695,698	1,587,398	1,614,184	1,596,469	1,110,420	888,669	904,760	1,709,006	17,592,001
2018	1,716,898	1,514,348	812,208	786,418	1,312,259	1,595,861	1,625,484	1,609,133	1,596,604	1,670,464	1,651,264	1,719,871	17,610,812
2019	1,722,532	1,513,258	988,168	870,461	1,304,989	1,613,692	1,495,641	1,629,686	1,468,506	774,982	1,071,999	1,703,934	16,157,848
2020	1,704,552	1,587,462	1,646,092	1,576,920	1,388,766	1,602,890	1,615,226	1,608,818	1,126,461	1,056,684	1,649,916	1,702,858	18,266,645
2021	1,708,554	1,541,300	1,689,100	1,185,663	1,063,159	1,370,410	1,245,009	1,579,102	1,582,426	1,653,862	1,633,797	1,701,602	17,953,984
2022	1,710,596	1,541,022	1,680,776	879,010	907,276	1,588,186	1,597,776	1,521,632	1,420,682	792,885	1,279,509	1,701,681	16,512,031
2023	1,705,902	1,541,101	1,691,276	1,594,376	1,688,708	1,594,533	1,569,022	1,609,965	1,560,176	1,193,866	1,222,951	1,668,242	18,639,118
2024	1,708,002	1,580,852	1,374,263	769,298	1,453,360	1,416,156	1,555,100	1,598,220	1,569,040	1,655,228	1,633,956	1,711,494	18,024,969
2025	1,716,710	1,549,804	1,423,802	875,350	1,667,532	1,598,883	1,596,496	1,615,708	1,242,416	939,753	1,648,810	1,710,745	17,586,009
2026	1,609,415	1,541,282	1,697,731	1,632,066	1,679,004	1,590,384	1,604,712	1,591,879					--

== Surrounding population ==
The Nuclear Regulatory Commission defines two emergency planning zones around nuclear power plants: a plume exposure pathway zone with a radius of 10 miles (16 km), concerned primarily with exposure to, and inhalation of, airborne radioactive contamination, and an ingestion pathway zone of about 50 miles (80 km), concerned primarily with ingestion of food and liquid contaminated by radioactivity.

The 2010 U.S. population within 10 miles (16 km) of D.C. Cook was 54,638, an increase of 3.4 percent in a decade, according to an analysis of U.S. Census data for msnbc.com. The 2010 U.S. population within 50 miles (80 km) was 1,225,096, an increase of 2.8 percent since 2000. Cities within 50 miles include South Bend, IN (26 miles to city center), Michigan City, IN, St. Joseph, MI, and Kalamazoo, MI.

== Former visitors’ center ==
The plant had a visitors’ center that was open to the public six days a week on a drop in basis. Since the attacks of September 11, however, the plant opened only for school groups by reservation. The visitors’ center featured a 26-foot (7.9 m) animated model demonstrating how the plant operates. The visitors’ center closed permanently in 2020.

== Ownership ==
The plant is operated by the Indiana Michigan Power Company and owned by American Electric Power.

== Incidents ==
- In 1971 an electrician was killed in a construction accident while building the site.
- In 1976 two workers were killed in a recirculation pit (sump) by asphyxiation from argon inerting gas used to support welding on stainless steel piping.
- July 13, 1990 one person was killed by electrocution and three others suffered severe burn injuries from a 4kv switchgear explosion.
- In September, 1997, both units were shut down for approximately three years when, as a result of NRC inspections in the engineering area, it became unclear whether emergency core cooling systems could perform their intended functions in the event of a design basis accident.
- In 1998 the NRC imposed a $500,000 civil penalty for 37 regulatory violations, mostly concerning the containment ice condenser used in responding to some loss-of-coolant accidents.
- On May 12, 2002, Unit 2 was automatically shut down due to the failure of both redundant DC power supplies in the Reactor Control & Instrumentation System. Due to inadequate corrective actions, the same event occurred on February 5, 2003.
- A transformer fire caused an automatic shutdown of Unit 1 in 2003 and release of cooling oil to Lake Michigan.
- A massive intrusion of fish caused both units to be manually shut down for several weeks on April 24, 2003. Due to the degradation in Essential Service Water flow to the plants' Emergency Diesel Generators, the site entered the Emergency Plan at the Alert level. The Alert was exited approximately 25 hours later.
- On September 20, 2008 unit 1's main turbine and generator were damaged by severe turbine vibrations caused by broken low-pressure turbine blades. A fire also broke out in the generator of Unit 1. No radiation was released and Unit 2 continued to operate at full power.
- The plant's Unit 2 reactor was shut on October 12, 2020. American Electric Power Company Inc. said service was suspended from the 1,168 megawatt (MW) unit when it tripped due to lowering water level in one of the plant’s four steam generators.
- In the late night hours of June 22, 2021, operators discovered a leak in a high pressure steam line providing non-radioactive steam to the low pressure turbines of unit 2. The leak appeared to grow larger as it was monitored, leading to a manual shutdown of unit 2. A plant spokesman stated that an assessment is underway to determine the cause of the steam leak and develop a repair timeline, however, I&M does not release return-to-service projection information for generation units for competitive reasons. Meanwhile, unit 1 continued to operate at full capacity with no interruption of power to customers.
- An "unusual event" was detected at 10:44 A.M on January 6, 2022. According to an alert from the United States Nuclear Regulatory Commission, a potential fire was detected, but there was no fire.
- On March 4, 2025, A suspect was arrested after ramming a security barrier at the Cook Nuclear Plant in Bridgman, Michigan. The incident occurred around 8:30 p.m. when the individual drove through the main entrance. Authorities stated there was no threat to the public or plant security. The suspect, not affiliated with the facility, is in custody facing multiple charges.

== Seismic risk ==
The Nuclear Regulatory Commission's estimate of the risk each year of an earthquake intense enough to cause core damage to the reactor at D.C. Cook was 1 in 83,333, according to an NRC study updated in June 2018.

== Additional information ==
	Unit 1	Unit 2
Reactor type	Pressurized water	
Reactor manufacturer	Westinghouse	
Turbine manufacturer	General Electric	Brown Boveri
Generation capacity	1030 megawatts	1168 megawatts
Transmission system connection	345,000 volts	765,000 volts
Construction began	March 1, 1969	
Grid connection	February 10, 1975	March 22, 1978
Operational date	August 27, 1975	July 1, 1978
Expiration of original license	October 25, 2014	December 23, 2017
Expiration of renewed license	2034	2037

== See also ==
- List of largest power stations in the United States
