= The Path =

The Path may refer to:

== Music ==
- The Path (Carbon Based Lifeforms album), 1998
- The Path (Fit for a King album), 2020
- The Path (Show of Hands album), 2003
- "The Path", a song by HIM from their 2003 album Love Metal
- "The Path", a song by The Human Abstract from their 2008 album Midheaven
- "The Path", a song by Lorde from her 2021 album Solar Power

== Television ==
- "The Path" (The Twilight Zone), a 2002 episode
- The Path (TV series), a 2016 series
- "The Path" (The Last of Us), a 2025 episode

== Other ==
- The Path (book), a collection of essays by Konosuke Matsushita
- The Path (comics), an American comic book series by CrossGen Entertainment
- The Path (video game), a horror PC game

== See also ==
- Path or PATH (disambiguation)
