= Routing (disambiguation) =

Routing is the process of path selection in a network, such as a computer network or transportation network.

Routing may also refer to:

- Route of administration, the path by which a drug, fluid, poison or other substance is brought into contact with the body
- Hollowing out an area of wood or plastic using a router (woodworking)
- National Routeing Guide, a guide to trains over the United Kingdom's rail network
- Routing (hydrology), a technique used to predict the changes in shape of a hydrograph
- ABA routing transit number, a bank code used in the United States
- Routing number (Canada)
- Weather routing

In electronics and computer technologies:

- Routing (electronic design automation), a step in the design of printed circuit boards and integrated circuits
- The packet forwarding algorithm in a computer network
- The role of a router hardware in a computer network
- The role of a journey planner

== See also ==
- Forwarding (disambiguation)
- Route (disambiguation)
- Router (disambiguation)
- Rout, as in battle
- Vehicle routing problem
