= The Route =

The Route may refer to:

- The Route (film), a Ugandan film
- The Route (TV series), a Spanish television series
- Route, County Antrim a medieval territory in Gaelic Ireland

== See also ==
- Route (disambiguation)
