= Couchette car =

Railway carriage with sleeping compartments

A couchette car is a railway carriage conveying non- or semi-private sleeping accommodation.

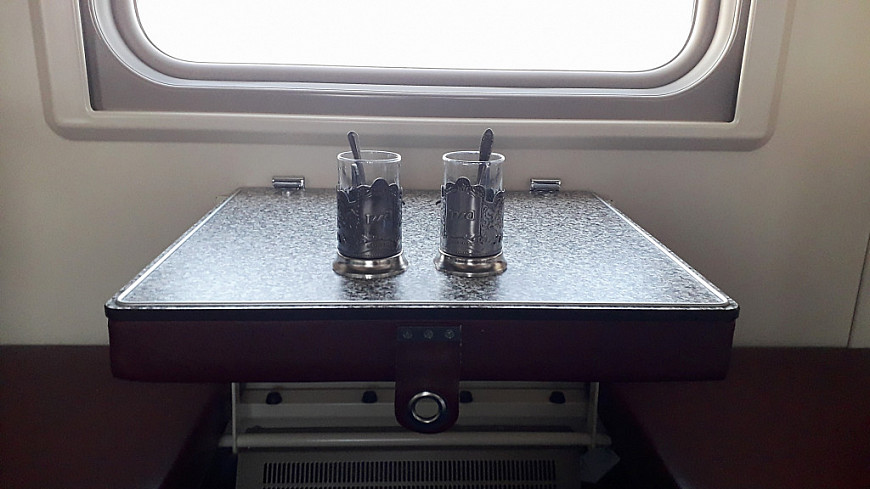
Glasses and a table in a Russian Railways reserved-seating car

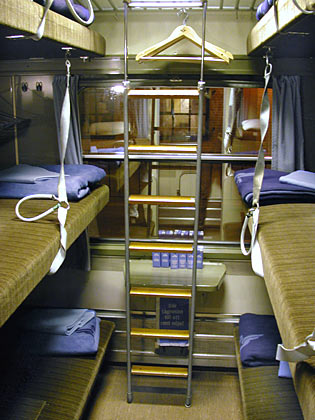
The interior of a typical European couchette compartment, with the beds folded down to the night-time configuration

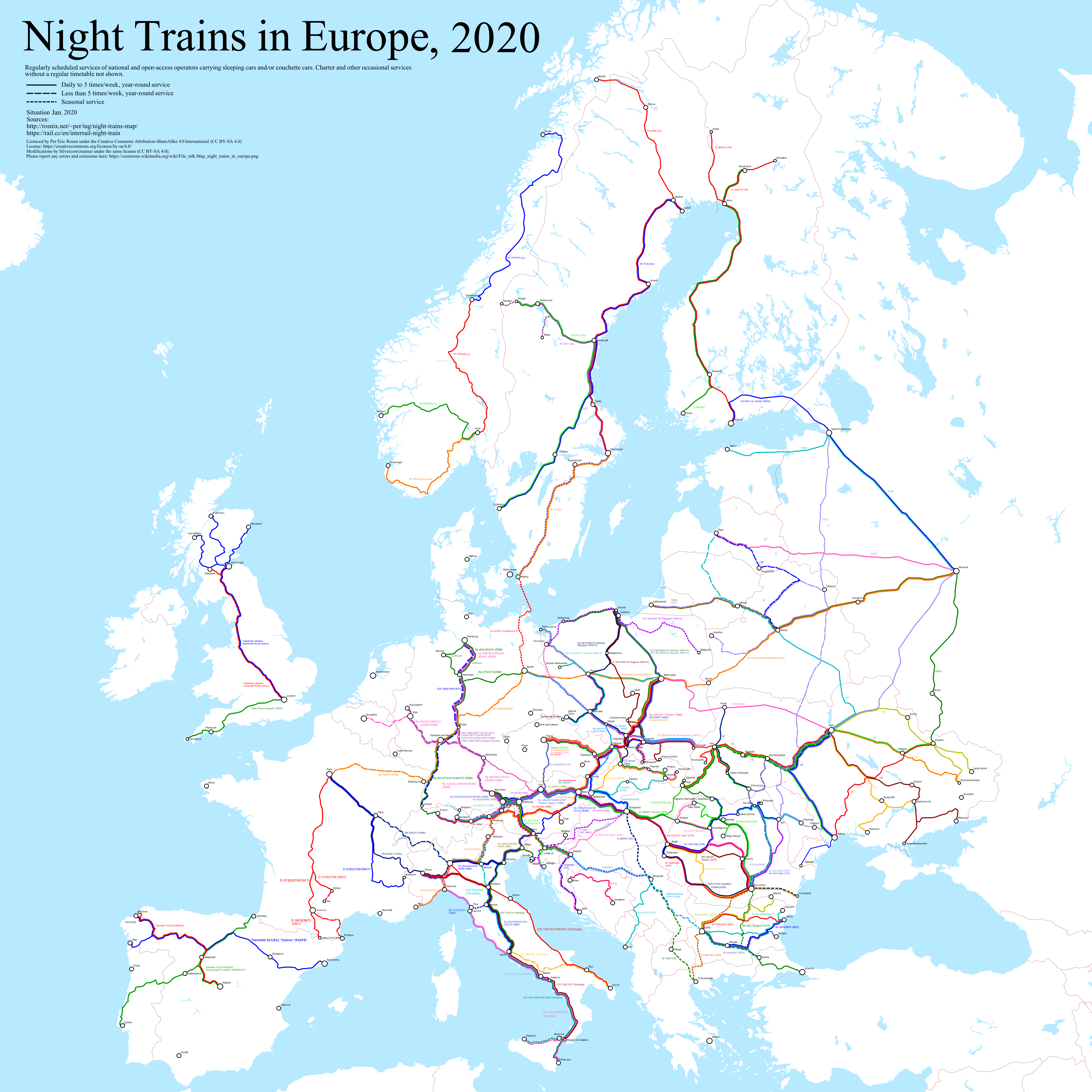
Map of European night trains carrying sleeper or couchette cars (2020)

The car is divided into a number of compartments (typically 8 to 10) accessed from the side corridor of the car, which in daytime are configured with a bench seat along each long side of the compartment. At an appropriate time in the journey, the attendant who travels in the car (or by agreement the passengers booked in the compartment) converts the compartment into its night-time configuration with two (1st class) or three (2nd class) bunks on each long side of the compartment, creating a total of four bunks in first class and six in second class.

Typically, in 2nd class the seat serves as the lowest bunk, and the back of the seat is turned into a horizontal position and serves as the middle bunk. There are two types of couchette car in countries of the former USSR: "coupé" and "platzkart". "Coupé" cars are more expensive and comfortable with 4-bunk compartments fully separated from each other and the corridor. The cheaper "Platzkart" cars, use a somewhat different layout, with no wall between compartment and corridor, only four bunks along the long sides of the compartment, and two more mounted on the corridor wall, the lower bunk folding in the daytime to become two seats.

== Service ==
The attendant provides a sheet, blanket, and pillow for each passenger. Unlike in sleeping cars, couchette compartments are not always segregated by sex, and it is normal not to undress except for removing footwear.

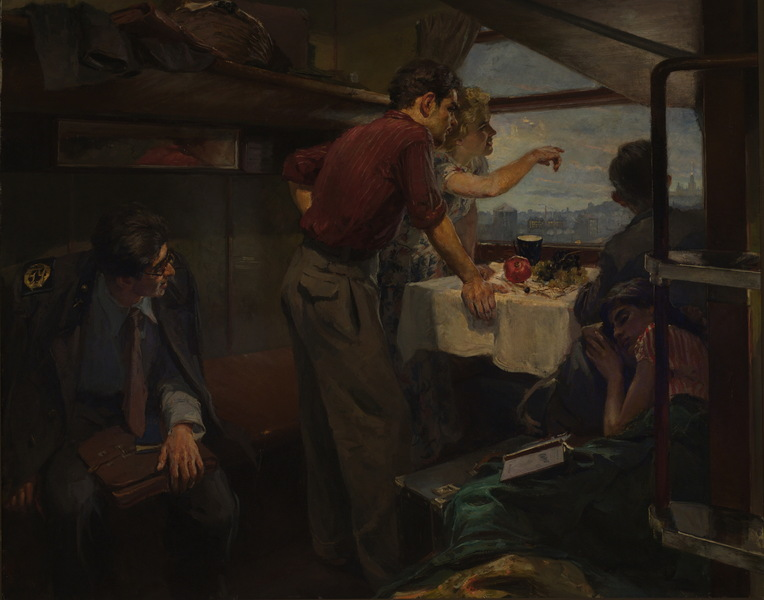
A couchette compartment: 1953 oil painting by Anatoly Lazarevich Papyan (1924-2007), National Gallery of Armenia

One compartment at the end of the car is reserved for the use of the attendant (who may supervise two adjacent cars), who will sell (if not included in the fare) hot and cold drinks and continental breakfasts in the morning. In western Europe the attendant will take charge of passengers' tickets and passports at the start of the journey, returning them before arrival at the destination, thus ensuring that passengers are not disturbed by ticket and passport inspections. In some former eastern bloc countries this is not done, and it is normal for passengers to be awakened by border police and railway inspectors at each border crossing. Toilets and washrooms are located at the ends of the car.

Couchette cars have not been as popular in Britain (except on the Royal Train, presumably as staff accommodation); as they have been in continental Europe, although a number of sleeper trains can trace their history back to as early as the 1870s. It was normal practice, nevertheless, for British passengers to join long-distance overnight trains at Calais, Boulogne, Ostend or Hook of Holland after crossing the English Channel or North Sea by ferry. There has been a substantial decline in the number of long-distance overnight train services since the mid-1990s, caused by the increase in the number of high-speed daytime services, and competition from low-cost airlines. Environmental organizations are trying to make night trains more attractive again, as a more climate-friendly alternative to short-haul flights.

== See also ==
- Auto Train
- CityNightLine
- Sleeping car
- Hard sleeper
