= Potomac-Appalachian Transmission Highline =

Proposed 290 mile 765 kilovolt electric power transmission line

The Potomac-Appalachian Transmission Highline (PATH) was a proposed 290 mile 765 kilovolt electric power transmission line designed to supply power from the Amos Substation in Putnam County, West Virginia, to a proposed electrical substation to be constructed in Frederick County, Maryland. If approved, the transmission line would have been owned and operated by subsidiary companies of Allegheny Energy and the American Electric Power Company. The route proposed would have gone through 13 counties in West Virginia, three counties in Virginia, and Frederick County in Maryland. The endpoint in Maryland would be a proposed electrical substation in Kemptown, Maryland, that would be in a residential area surrounded by about 1,300 houses. The Kemptown substation would have been the largest substation ever built by Allegheny Power. The project was cancelled by PJM Interconnection in 2011.

== Application status ==
=== 2009 ===
Initial applications for regulatory approval to construct the PATH transmission line were filed in 2009. On September 9, 2009, the Maryland Public Service Commission rejected the application as improperly filed. PATH was given 30 days to declare whether they would refile in Maryland, but only announced they were reconsidering their options. On October 19, 2009, the Virginia State Corporation Commission filed a motion to dismiss the PATH application in Virginia, citing inability to adequately analyze the project due to an uncertain Maryland termination point. On October 28, 2009 an attorney for the West Virginia Public Service Commission moved to dismiss the PATH application in West Virginia. Virginia and West Virginia are requesting rejection of the application without prejudice, meaning PATH will be able to refile in those states once they have refiled a proper application in Maryland.

=== 2010 ===
Allegheny Power filed applications with Frederick County for a special exception to locate an electric power substation in agricultural zoned land. On September 15 they met with the Frederick County Planning Commission make a case that this is consistent with the Frederick County Comprehensive Plan. The commission found a substation of this size and at this location to be "inconsistent with the county's comprehensive plan." On September 29, 2010, there was a hearing for the Frederick County Board of Zoning Appeals at which PATH will submit a special exception zoning request. After several hearings, on November 18, 2010, the application for a special exception was denied. On December 20, 2010, Allegheny Power asked the Frederick County Board of Appeals to reconsider, and the board denied this request.

Regional grid manager, PJM Interconnection, "has several times shifted the date by which the line must be in service to address overloads, from 2012 to 2013 and 2014 and, most recently, to June 2015." On December 20, 2010, Allegheny Energy and AEP requested a procedural delay with the Public Service Commission of West Virginia.

=== 2011 ===
On February 28, 2011 PJM Interconnect requested that FirstEnergy (which took control of Allegheny Power on February 25, 2011) and American Electric Power suspend efforts on PATH. "Recent dramatic swings in economic forecasts and evolving public policies, particularly with respect to renewable energy, are adding greater uncertainty to our planning studies," PJM President and CEO Terry Boston said in a prepared statement. American Electric Power's and FirstEnergy Corp withdrew applications for the project in Maryland, Virginia, and West Virginia.

Dick Ishler, President of the Citizens Against the Kemptown Electrical Substation (CAKES) says this is a huge victory for the little guy; "This is but the latest example of David beating Goliath, concerned citizens banding together, in this case, to stop a toxic coal-fired transmission line." Will Burns, the Sierra Club attorney who has spent hundreds of hours researching the PATH project is optimistic PJM's order will close the PATH project down; "We didn't believe this was needed for reliability reasons. We're hoping this will be the last time this will come back again." However, PJM could revise the decision at a later time, and the PATH project could be renewed. "If they [PJM] come back and say we need PATH, then we can get the project back up and running. . . . The investment we’ve already made won’t be lost though, because the project is not lost – just suspended," said Doug Colafella, manager of external communications for FirstEnergy.

=== 2012 ===
In August 2012, "the board of PJM Interconnection, which oversees the needs and movement of wholesale electricity in the region, formally removed the project from future plans."

2024

On May 8, 2024, the PATH project appeared in a list of potential NEITCs drawn up by the U.S. Department of Energy. If approved, "A NIETC designation enables federal 'backstop' permitting, where the Federal Energy Regulatory Commission can step in to site (using federal eminent domain) and permit a transmission project that a state denies to approve."

== Kemptown property ==
In December 2008 PATH Allegheny Transmission Company, LLC purchased two contiguous properties in Kemptown, Maryland comprising 152.2 acres for $6.83 million. The properties, actively farmed at the time, were sold by the Browning family which held title to one property as a limited partnership and the other property as a limited liability company. The Kemptown properties are bisected by a high tension electrical transmission line owned by the Baltimore Gas and Electric Company and are adjacent to a second high tension electrical transmission line. The Kemptown property was slated by PATH as the location of a large electrical substation. In September 2010, PATH Allegheny Transmission Company, LLC conveyed the property to PATH Allegheny Maryland Transmission Company, LLC for no consideration.

On August 22, 2017 the two Kemptown properties, along with several other smaller properties in Maryland, Virginia and West Virginia were sold at public auction. F.C. Frederick, Inc. a non-profit soccer club based in Frederick Maryland submitted the winning bids on the Kemptown properties. Settlement on the transaction occurred in October 2017 at a price of $1.008 million.
