= Footpath (disambiguation) =

A footpath is a thoroughfare that is intended for pedestrian use.

Footpath may also refer to:

- Footpath (1953 film), 1953 Indian Hindi-language film written and directed by Zia Sarhadi
- Footpath (2003 film), 2003 Indian Hindi-language film directed by Vikram Bhatt

== See also ==
- Rights of way in England and Wales
- Sidewalk
- Trail
