= Pathway Intermediates Limited =

Pathway Intermediates Limited (No. 04220119) was founded in 2001 by cancer biologist Dr David Garnett and mathematician Dr Robin Jones. The principal activity of the company is the manufacture of a class of specialty chemicals known as biosurfactants.

The company has its headquarters in Shrewsbury, United Kingdom with additional manufacturing sites in England and South Korea, along with offices in South Korea, USA, China, Thailand and Vietnam.

The company exports to Europe, Asia and the Americas. Significant growth in these markets was recognised in 2012 when the company won a Queen's Awards for Enterprise. In 2011 the company entered a joint venture agreement with Easy Bio Systems of South Korea and established a manufacturing company Pathway Intermediates International Inc, located outside Seoul. In 2018 Easy Bio became the majority shareholder of Pathway Intermediates Limited.

Pathway Intermediates Limited conducts research into novel lysophospholipids, glycosides, glycerides and other esters and this work has attracted research grants from local and national government agencies.
