= Pathways Foundation =

The Pathways Foundation is an Australian non-profit organisation aiming to provide boys and girls with a contemporary rite of passage to manhood or womanhood. Their most popular program is the Pathways to Manhood camp at which over two thousand boys aged 12–16 have so far completed.

== About ==
There are approximately 20 camps held each year with around 15 boys attending each.

This process is run over a four- to six-day period in the bush. All boys have a male adult guardian to accompany them. The camps are run in eight locations around Australia.

== History ==
The Pathways to Manhood programme was developed by a group of men passionate about the health and well-being of boys and young men in Australia. The foundation was officially created in 1995, with the first camp being run that year.

The creators of the programme believed that boys need a large range of adult men to act as role models, confidants, mentors and friends to enable them do develop and discover their male identity and grow into helpful and respected members of society.

== Who is involved ==
=== Pathways to Manhood ===
The Pathways to Manhood camp are aimed at young males (approx 12–16) together with their fathers, step fathers, uncles, grandfathers or mentors.

=== Pathways into Womanhood ===
The Pathways to Womanhood camp is specifically designed for girls just entering puberty up to age of 16, who go to camp with their mother, grandmother, stepmother, auntie or mentor.

=== Young Stars ===
The Young Stars program is designed for fathers and their sons aged 6–10 years. This program is not a rite of passage, but quality time fathers can spend with their sons. This program is looking to expand into father and daughter, grandparent and son or daughter.

== Principles ==
Core principles advocated by the group are respect, Responsibility and awareness. These principles are used throughout the camp and used to assist boys and girls in finding their own identity.

== Locations ==
- Melbourne, Victoria,
- Mullumbimby, New South Wales,
- Perth, Western Australia,
- South East, Queensland,
- South Coast, New South Wales,
- Sydney, New South Wales,
