= Train path =

Infrastructure capacity to run a train

A train path is the infrastructure capacity needed to run a train between two places over a given time-period. Within the European Union, a train operator needs to purchase a train path from a rail infrastructure company to run a train on their tracks.

== Overview ==
The number of rail paths available on a given railway line depends on a number of factors. The number of tracks and the type of signalling, specifically the number of blocks, are limits set by the actual infrastructure. A variable factor is the speed difference between trains. Optimal capacity is achieved when all trains run at the same speed. When that is not the case, faster trains will eventually catch up to slower trains, so trains have to be spaced much further apart to avoid interference.

== Applications ==
Usually, train operators apply for train paths over a given period several months before the start of the period. After a deadline has passed, the rail infrastructure company uses all applications to create the working timetable. A number of rail infrastructure companies have defined different classes of train paths. More expensive classes are treated with priority during timetable construction and operation.

== Delayed trains ==
If a train is delayed beyond a certain tolerance, it will "fall out" of its allocated train path. On congested lines, this will result in additional delays, as such a train is taken to passing sidings whenever that is necessary to let other trains pass.

== Graphs ==
Train paths are usually shown on a time-distance graph, where time is shown horizontally, and distance (including a representation of the track layout) is shown vertically.

Simulation of a freight train followed by a faster passenger train, illustrating the need for an 18 minutes spacing at the start of the section
