= CityNightLine =

Swiss transportation company

CityNightLine AG
- Company type: Incorporation
- Industry: Rail transport
- Founded: 1995
- Defunct: 2016
- Fate: Merged with DB NachtZug
- Successor: City Night Line
- Headquarters: Dortmund, Germany
- Products: Rail transport (night train)
- Website: citynightline.de on archive.org

CityNightLine AG (timetable and platform sign abbreviation: CNL) was a Swiss night train service. CNL had right of passage grants in Germany, the Netherlands, Austria, Switzerland and Denmark. It served stations in Belgium, France, Italy and the Czech Republic.

== History ==
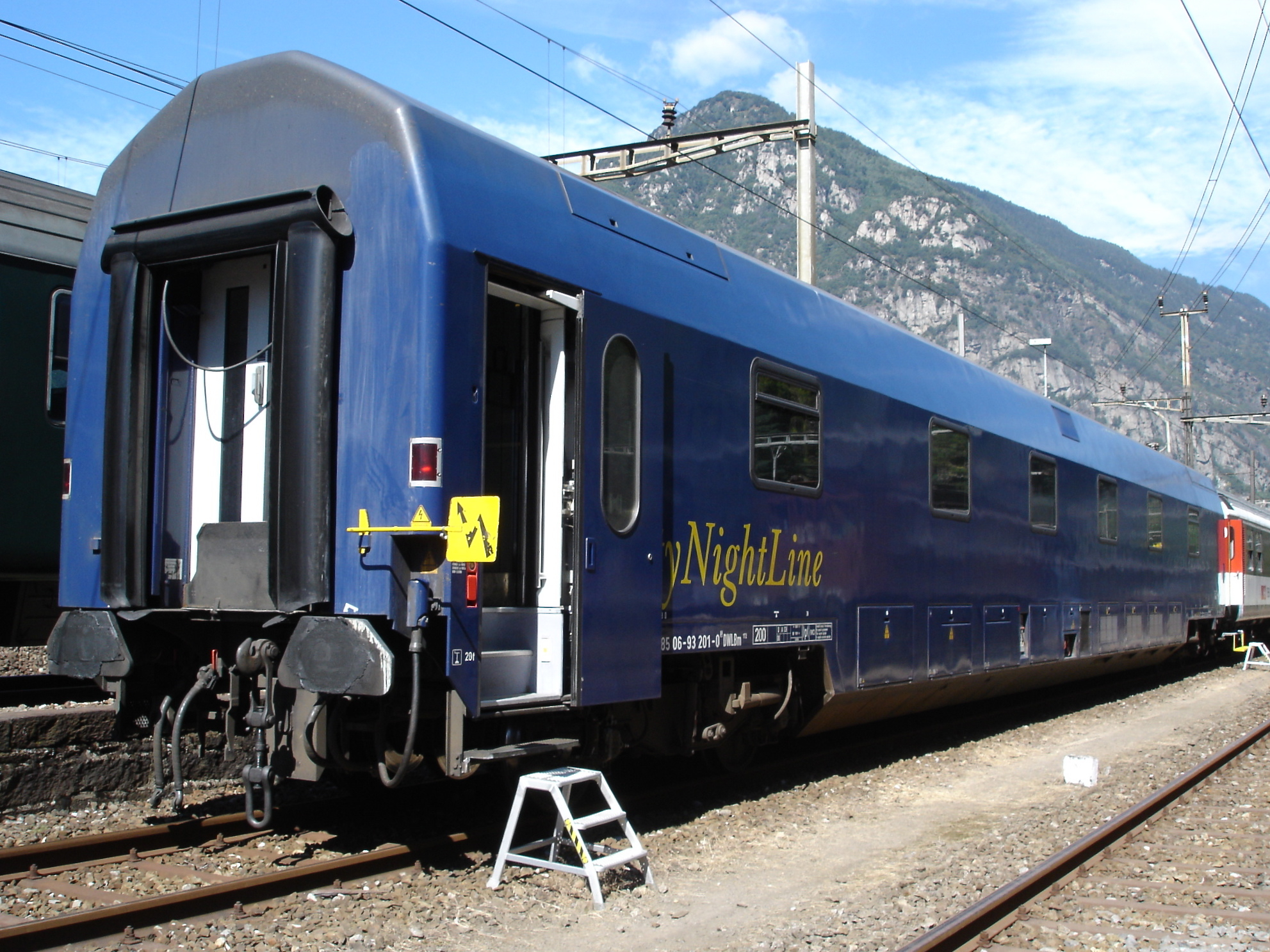
A CityNightLine sleeping car

CityNightLine AG was a joint project/creation undertaken by the Deutsche Bahn (DB) (German Federal Railways), the Austrian Federal Railways (ÖBB) and the Swiss Federal Railways (SBB-CFF-FFS). CityNightLine's first train departed on 28 May 1995. SBB-CFF-FFS and ÖBB have since ended their collaboration with CNL. As the predecessor joint CityNightLine company the new daughter company of DB is incorporated under Swiss law, based in Zurich.

CityNightLine was acquired by Deutsche Bahn AG in 2007 and merged with DB NachtZug to form the "City Night Line" which until 2016 offered night services in former CityNightLine and NachtZug territories, of which includes the majority of CityNightLine's operations at the time of the merger. At the end of 2016, CityNightLine stopped operating, carriages were sold to the Austrian Railways which extended their night train network under the brand Nightjet. Nightjet trains still connect Munich, Vienna, Zurich, Hamburg, Cologne, Berlin, Milan, Rome and other cities.

== See also ==
- List of companies of Switzerland
- Train categories in Europe
