= CFL Dosto =

CFL Dosto/Double-decker carriages
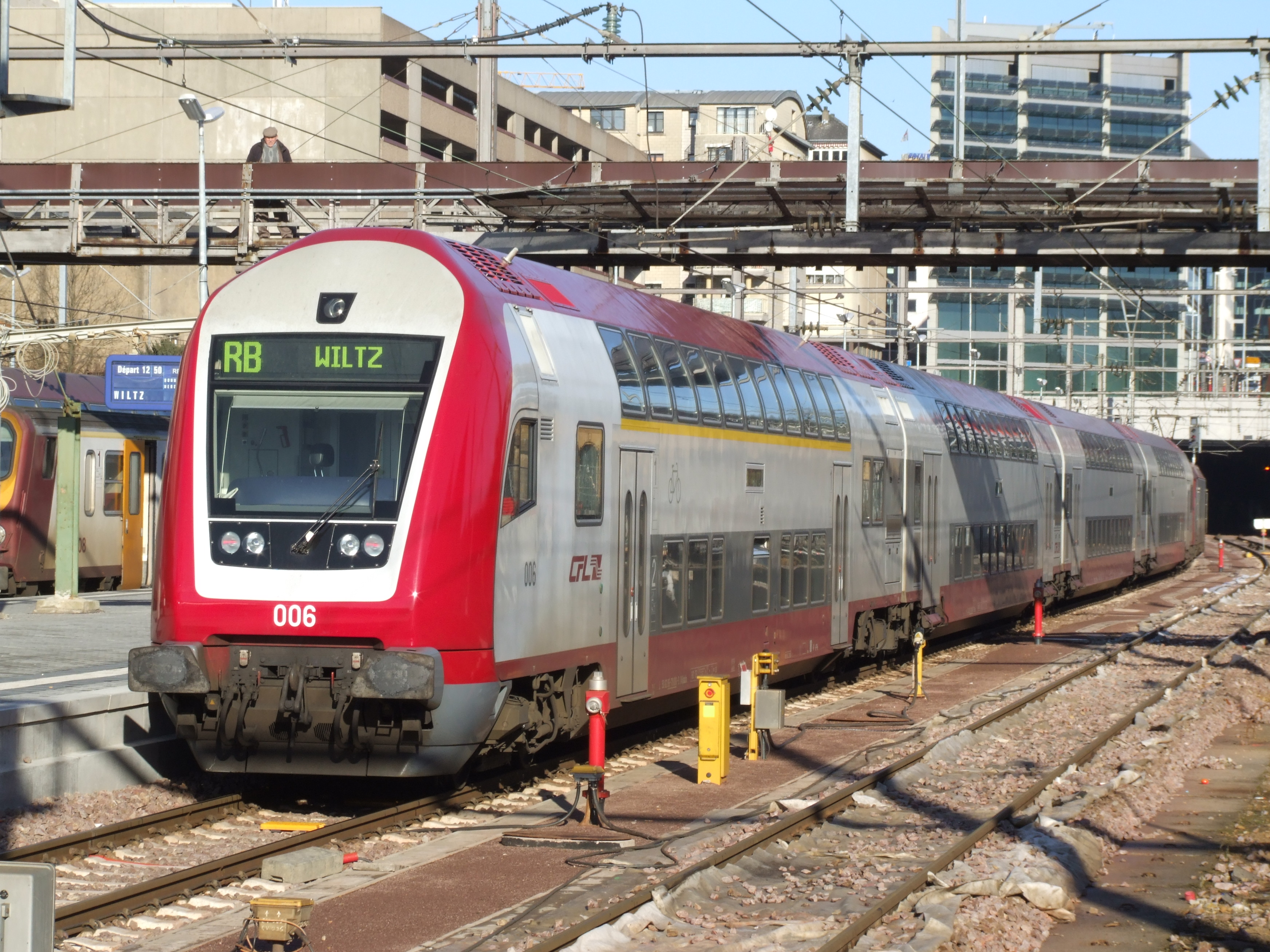
- A train consisted out of Bombardier double-decker carriages

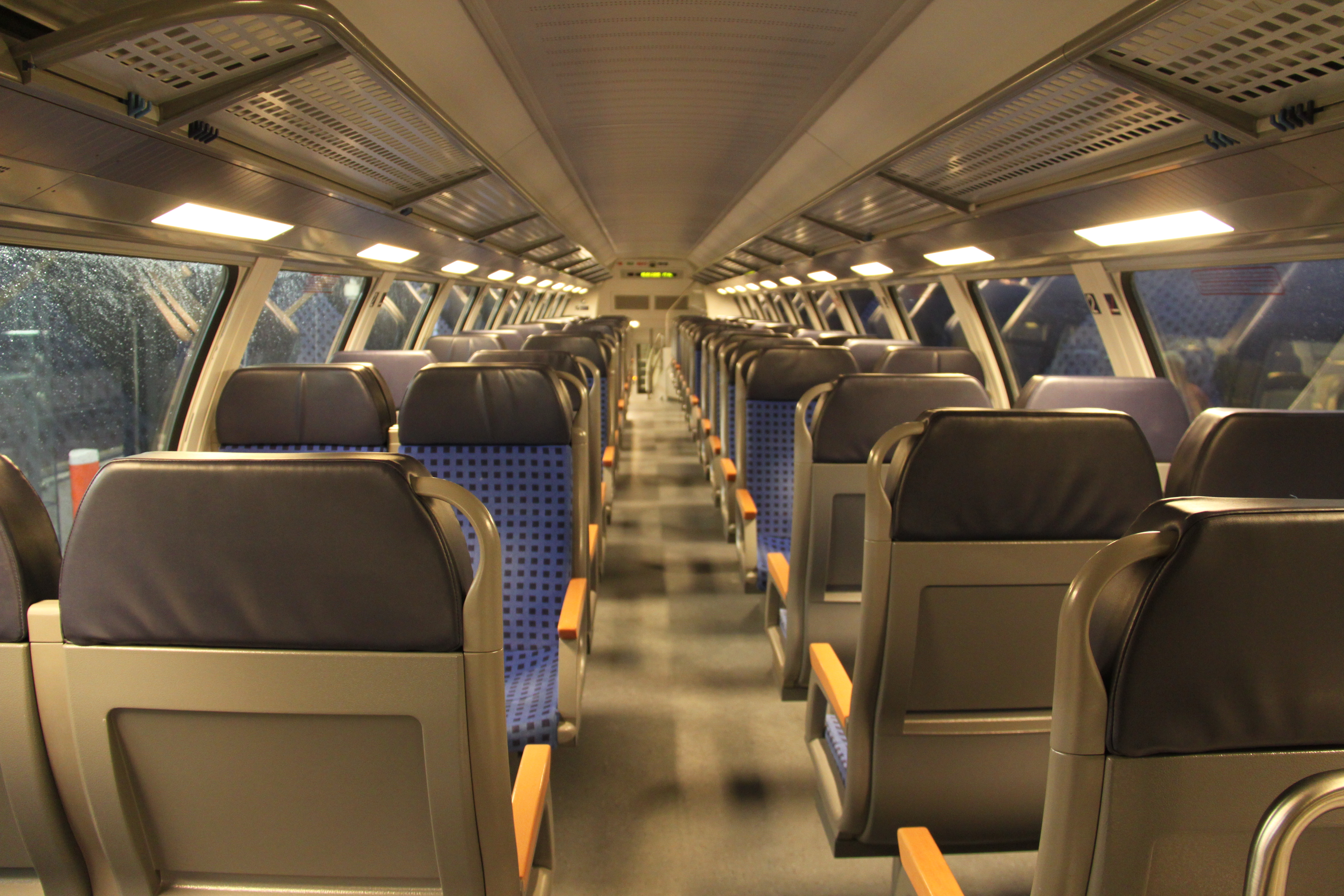
- Second class interior
- In service: 2005 - present
- Manufacturer: Bombardier
- Family name: Bombardier Double-deck Coach
- Constructed: 2004 - 2005, 2008
- Number built: 87
- Number in service: 87
- Formation: Push-pull
- Capacity: 2nd class carriage: 133; 1/2nd class carriage:116 1/2nd class control car: 80
- Operators: CFL

Specifications
- Car length: 26.8 m (87 ft 11 in) - 27.27 m (89 ft 6 in)
- Width: 2.784 m (9 ft 2 in)
- Maximum speed: 160 km/h (99 mph)
- Weight: 50-52 t
- Track gauge: 1,435 mm (4 ft 8 1/2 in) standard gauge

The CFL-Dosto is the name for three series of Double-deck coaches by Bombardier for Luxembourg CFL. In various lengths, they form a Push-pull train with 3000 and 4000-locomotives.

== Interior ==
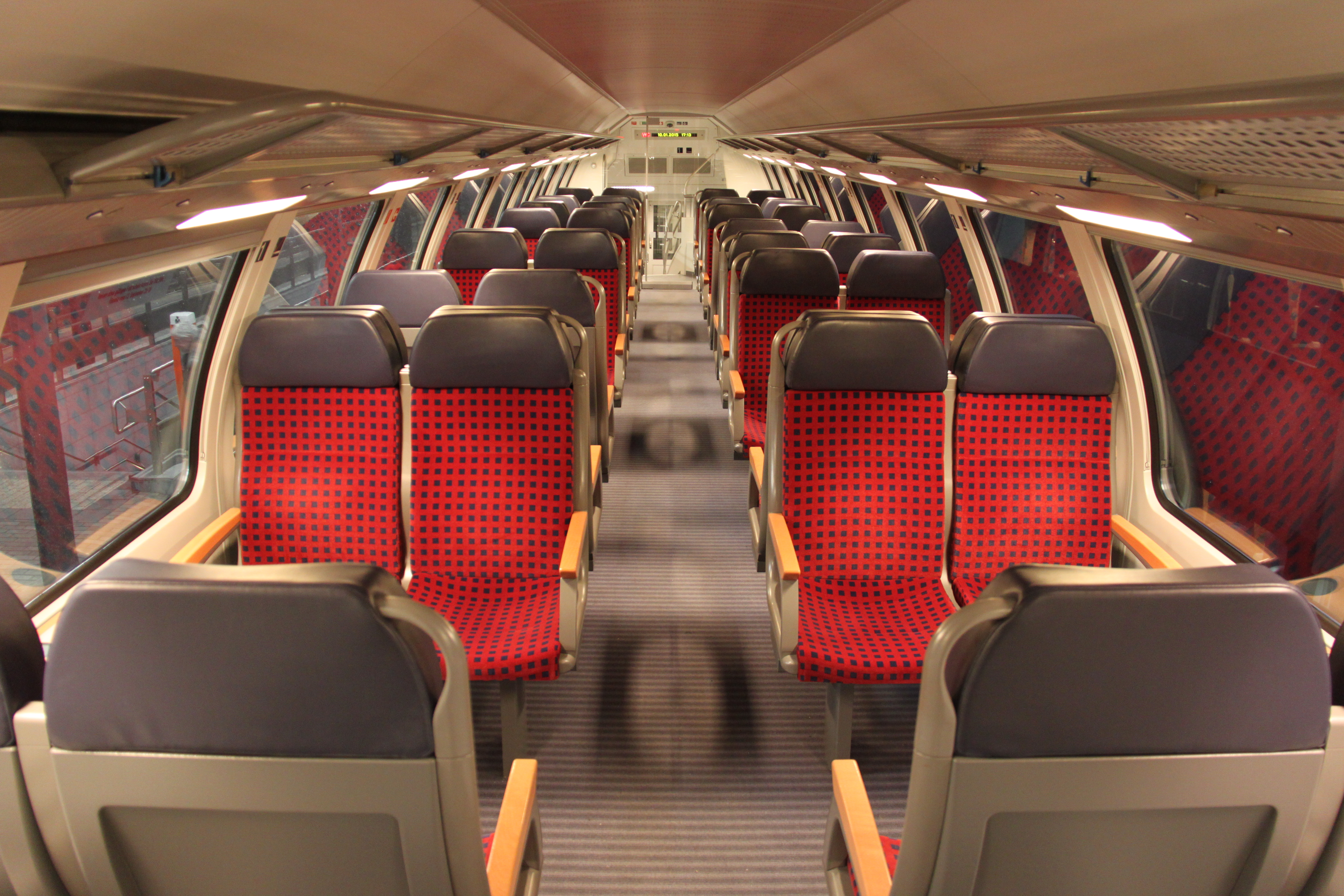
First class

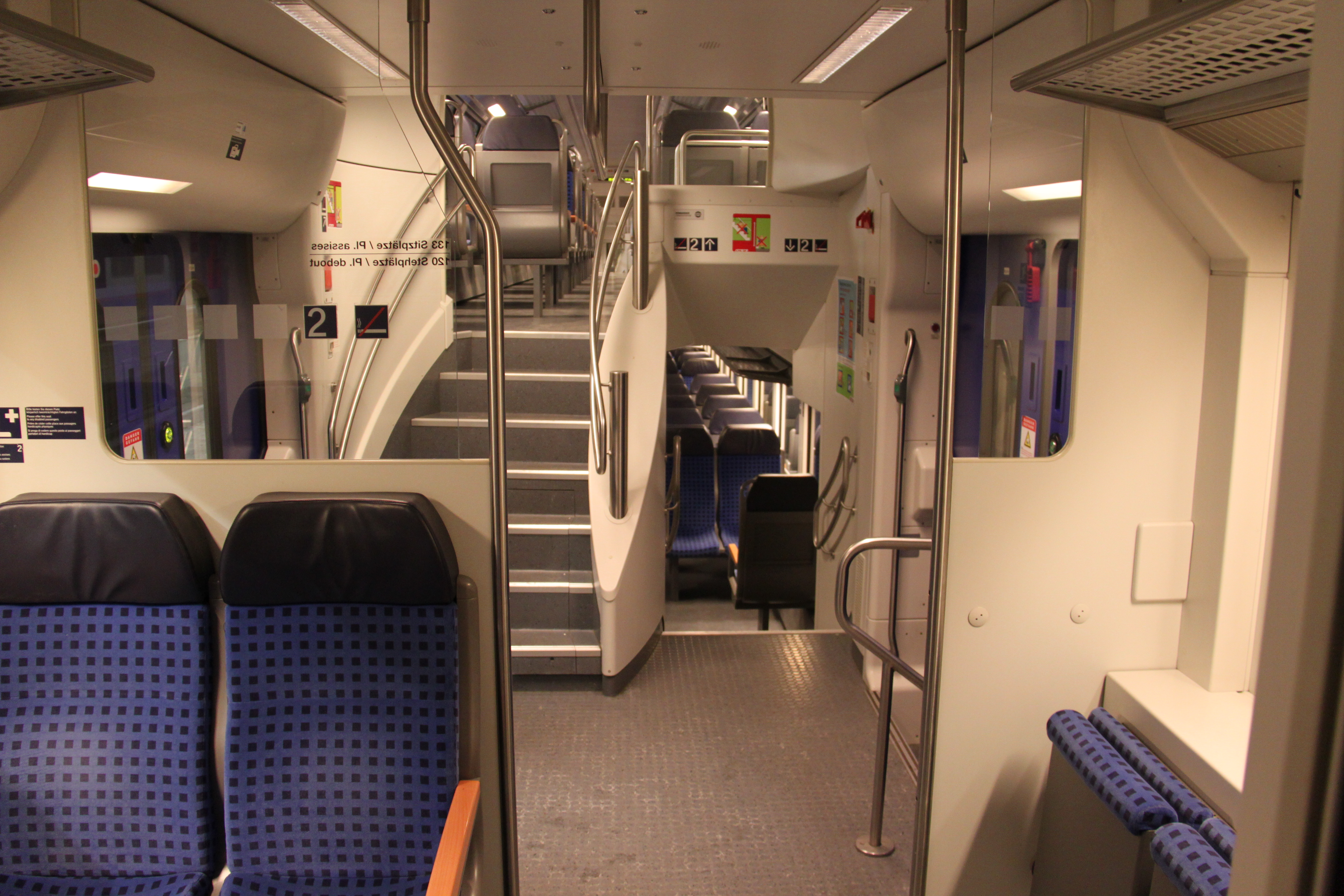
Second class

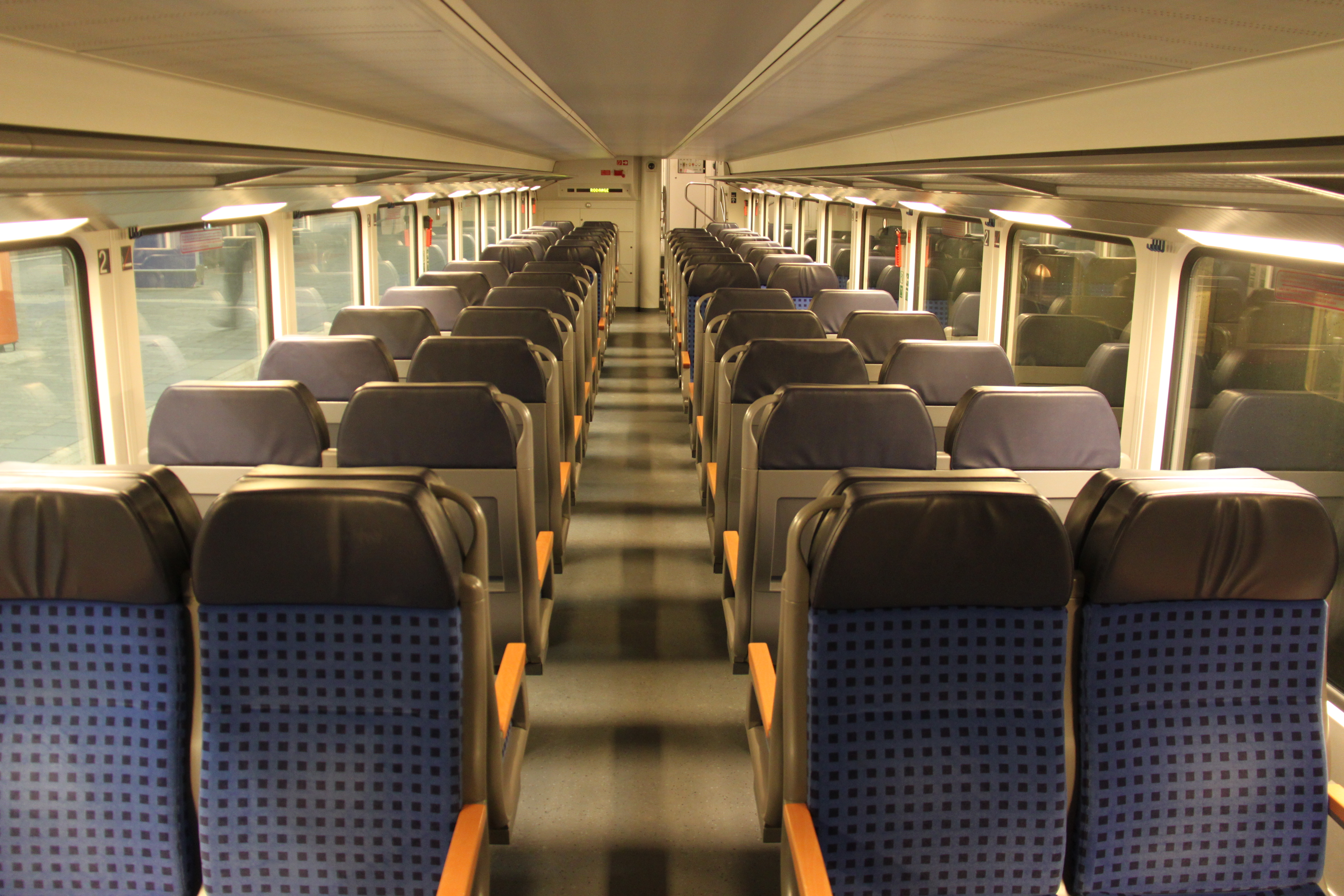
Second class
