= 4000 class =

4000 class or Class 4000 may refer to:

- Adelaide Metro 4000 class, electric multiple units
- CFL Class 4000, electric locomotives
- GWR 4000 Class, 4-6-0 steam locomotives
- NIR Class 4000, diesel multiple units
