= Bombardier Double-deck Coach =

Bi-level passenger rail car

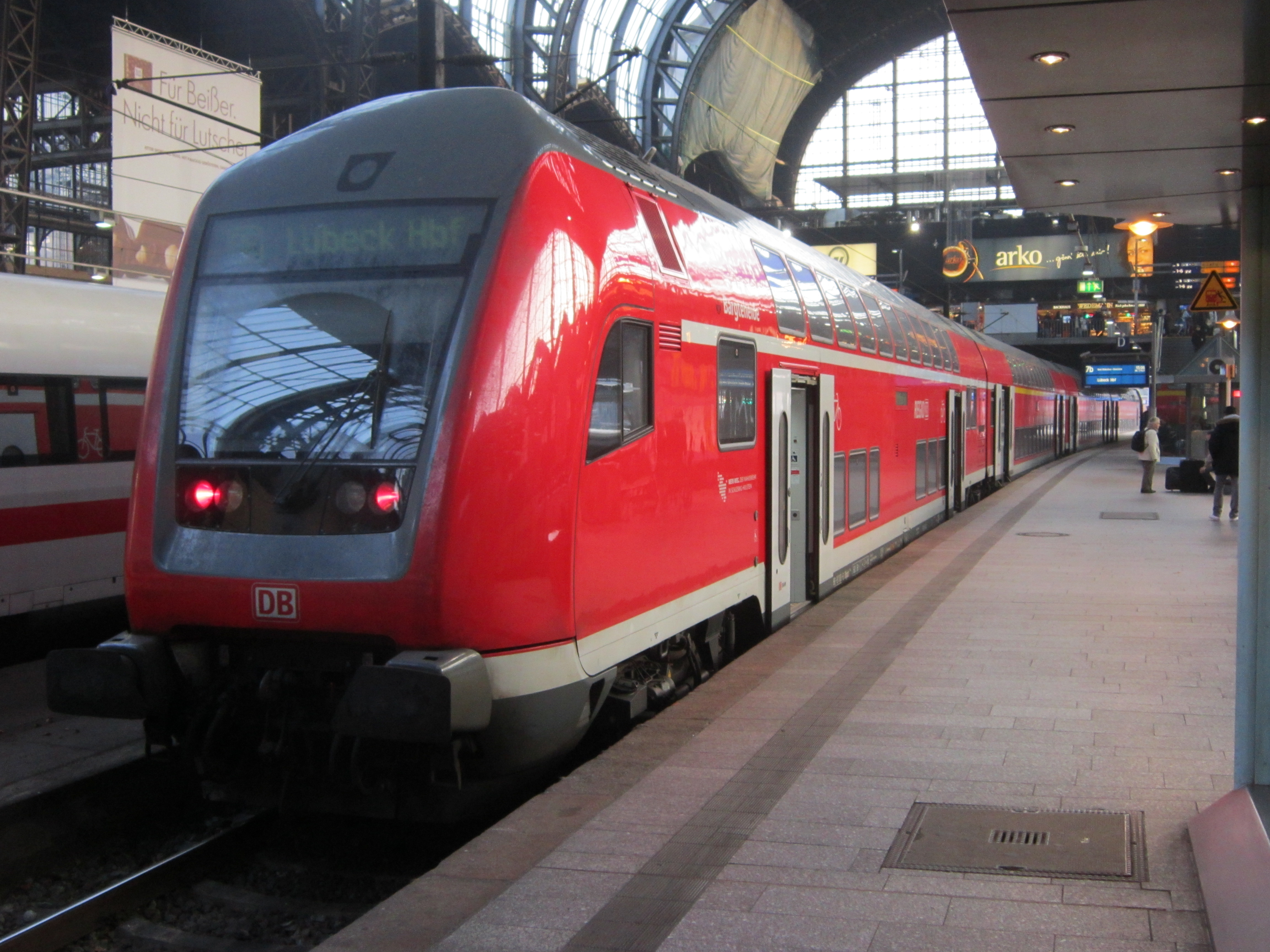
4th Generation unit in use by Deutsche Bahn

The Double-deck Coach is a bilevel passenger railcar used by various European railways and Israel Railways. It was manufactured by Alstom until 2025, and previously by Bombardier Transportation (until 2021), Adtranz, and DWA/Waggonbau Görlitz. The current generation of double-deck coaches can be run at speeds up to 200 km/h (125 mph). Depending on their configuration, each coach can seat 100 to 150 passengers.

== History ==
The ancestry of these coaches can be traced back to the LBE double-deck coaches (de:Doppelstock-Stromlinien-Wendezug der LBE) built by Waggonbau Görlitz at Görlitz for the Lübeck–Büchen–Hamburg railway in 1935–36. They were push-pull trains with a cab car that could control the steam locomotive at the other end of the train. They were the first of their kind to be developed in Germany.

After World War II, these coaches were developed further by VEB Waggonbau Görlitz (formerly WUMAG) into double-deck trains of two to five articulated cars sharing bogies, known as "Doppelstock(glieder)züge" (de:Gliederzug (Schiene)). Like the successor 1st generation units, many of these coaches were sold to several railways in the Eastern Bloc, such as in Romania where they are still operated as TE Acvila coaches. Deutsche Bundesbahn of West Germany now opted only for single level coaches and multiple units until its purchase of the 2nd generation Class 760 double-deck coaches in the early-1990s.

Starting in 1974, single coaches were built again that were the direct ancestors of today's double-deck coaches. These trainsets were used by Deutsche Reichsbahn (East Germany) as well as several other railways of the Eastern Bloc in large numbers (about 4000). After 1990, VEB Waggonbau Görlitz became part of Deutsche Waggonbau AG (DWA) which was acquired by Bombardier Transportation in 1998. Bombardier Inc. sold their railway division to Alstom in 2021.

In 2025, the Görlitz plant was sold to arms manufacturer KNDS. The last coach was delivered to Israel Railways on 16 December 2025, and the plant now produces components for armored fighting vehicles such as the Leopard 2, Puma, and Boxer. There are no plans to continue producing the coaches at other Alstom locations.

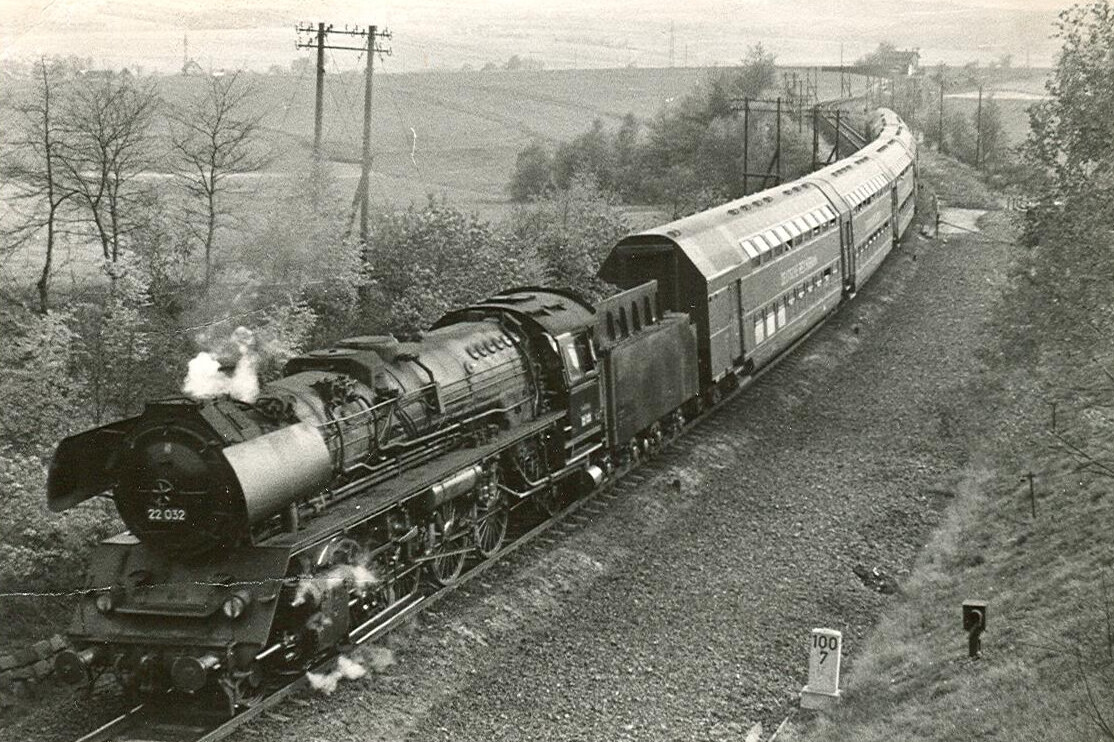
An articulated five-unit Doppelstockgliederzug rake hauled by DR Class 22 032 (circa 1964)

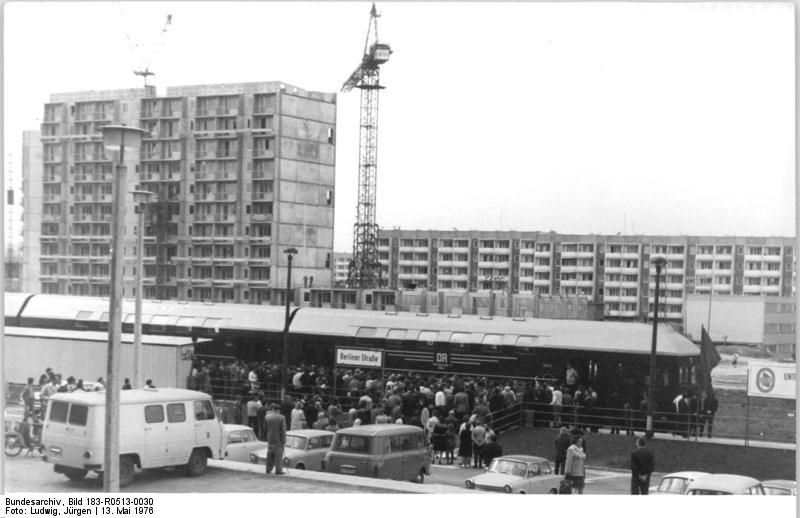
A DR Doppelstockgliederzüg four-unit push-pull rake on an Erfurt S-Bahn service (May 1976)

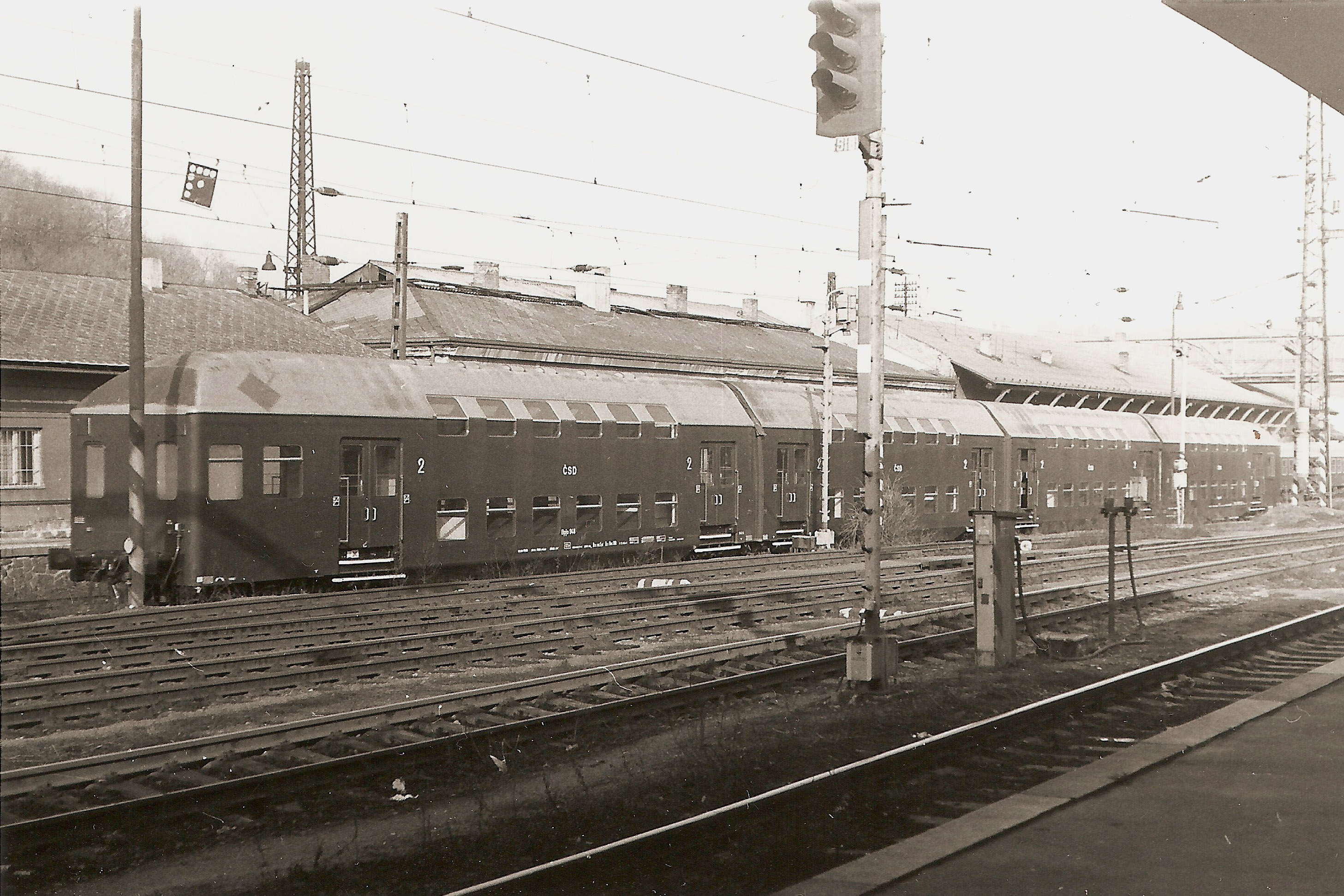
A ČSD Bpjo-type four-unit rake at Praha Smíchov (circa 1991)

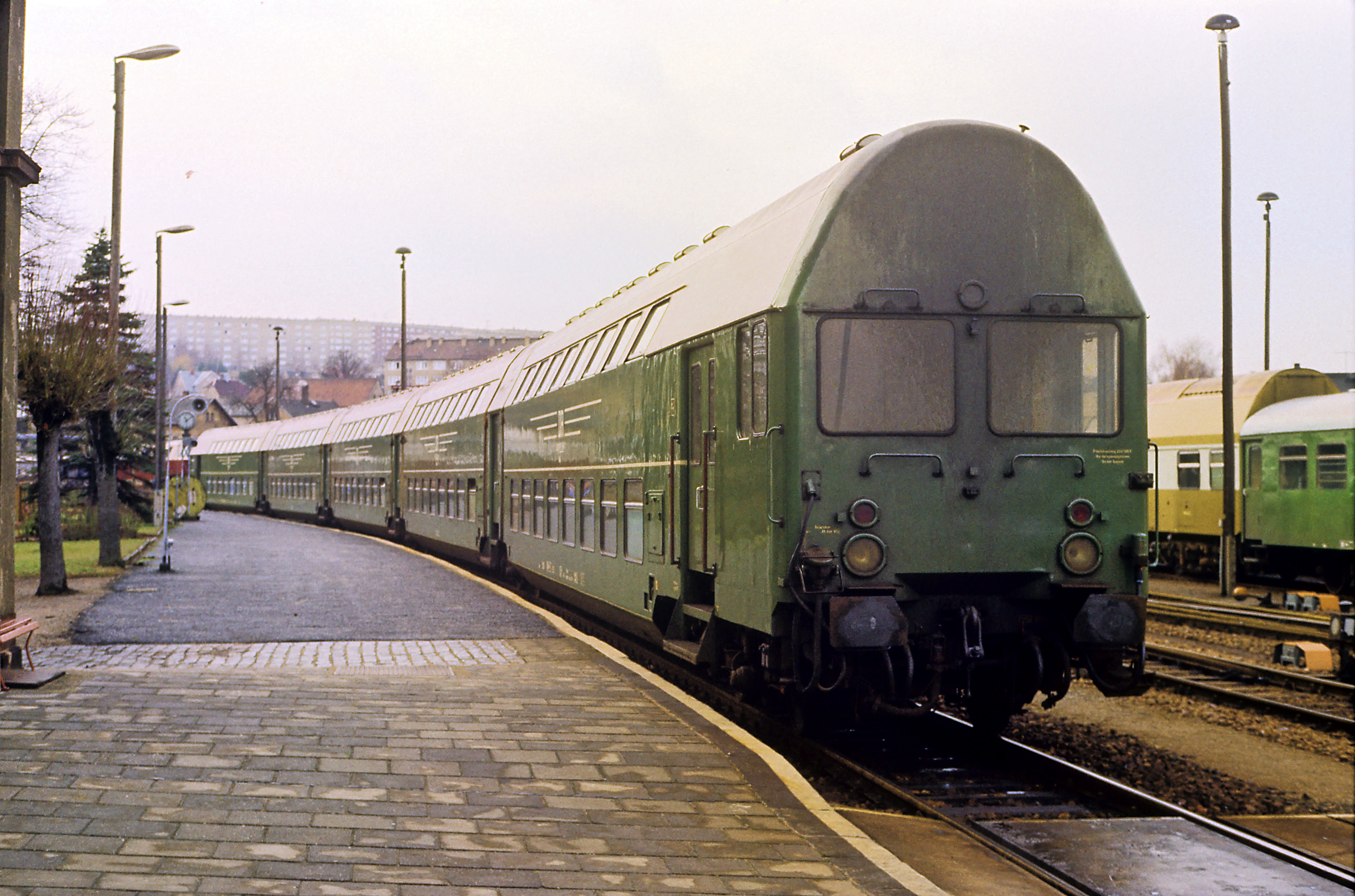
A DR DGBgqe-type control car from a 1971 five-unit Doppelstockgliederzug rake at Rochlitz (1993)

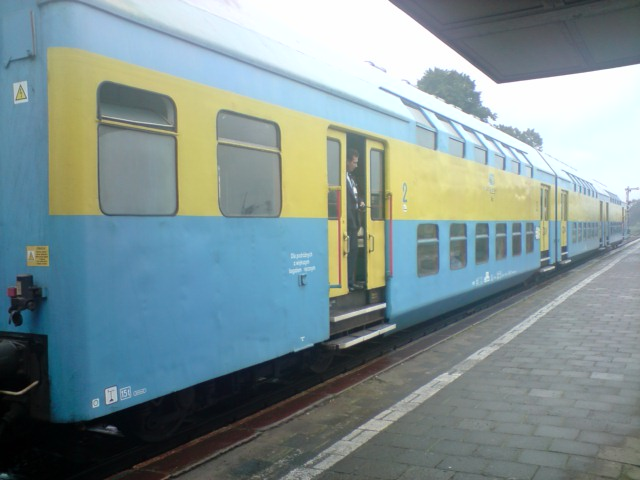
A PKP/Polregio rake of Bhp-type (pl; formerly Bipa) coaches at Czersk (September 2008)

== First generation ==
Built 1973–1974 and 1976–1991, sold to East Germany, Bulgaria, Poland, Romania, Czechoslovakia. In Czech Republic also known as UIC type Bmto292 (cz) and in Poland as UIC type Bmnopux/Bmteeo (pl; formerly type Bdhpumn), also nicknamed "bohun". Some German units were refurbished with 4th generation headshapes in the 2000s, some Polish units refurbished by Pesa Bydgoszcz from 2003–2009 and some Czech units refurbished 2001–2022.

Unlike the articulated bilevel stock that came before, these had complete bogie sets.

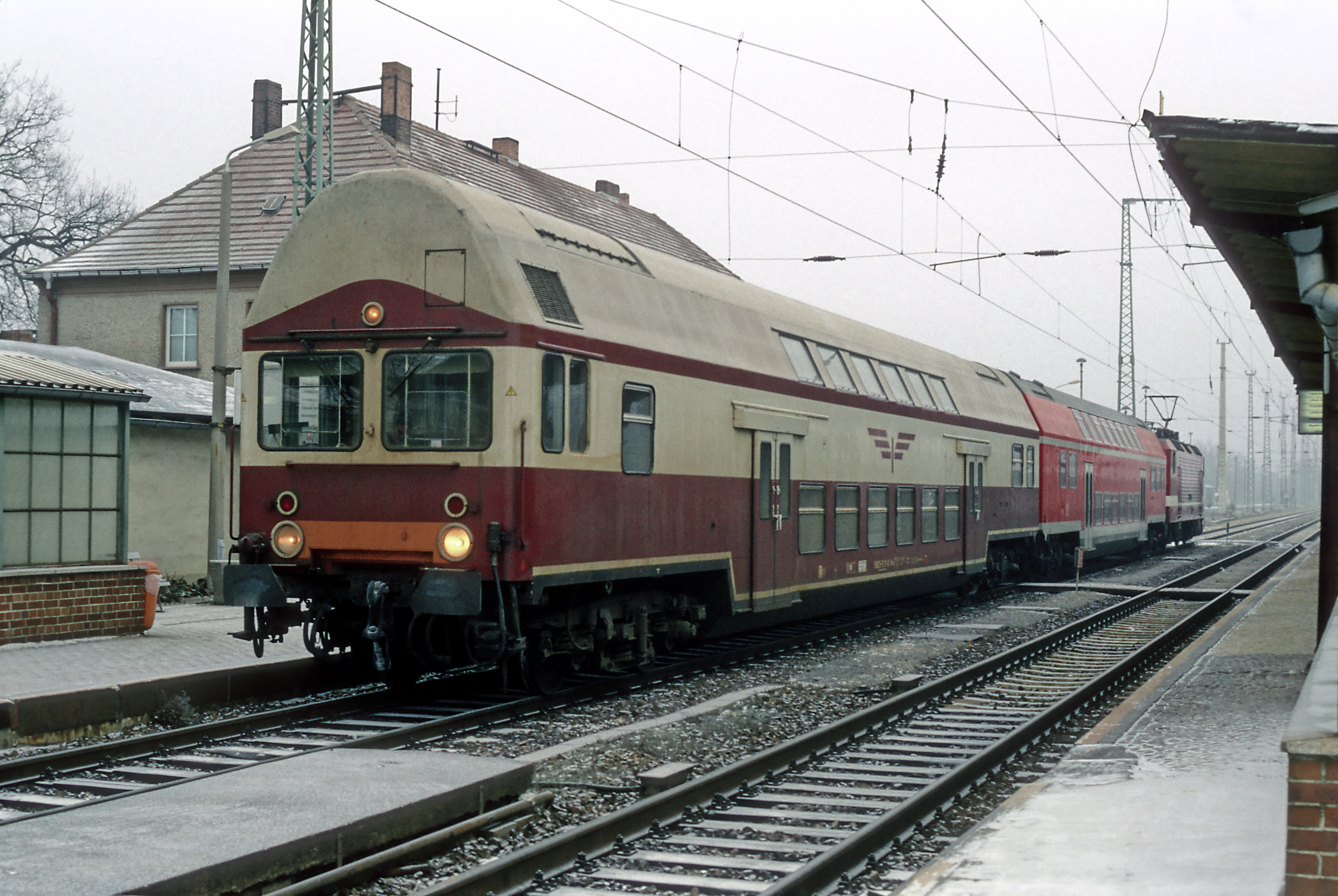
DR 1. Generation Doppelstockwagen rake in Calau (January 1997)

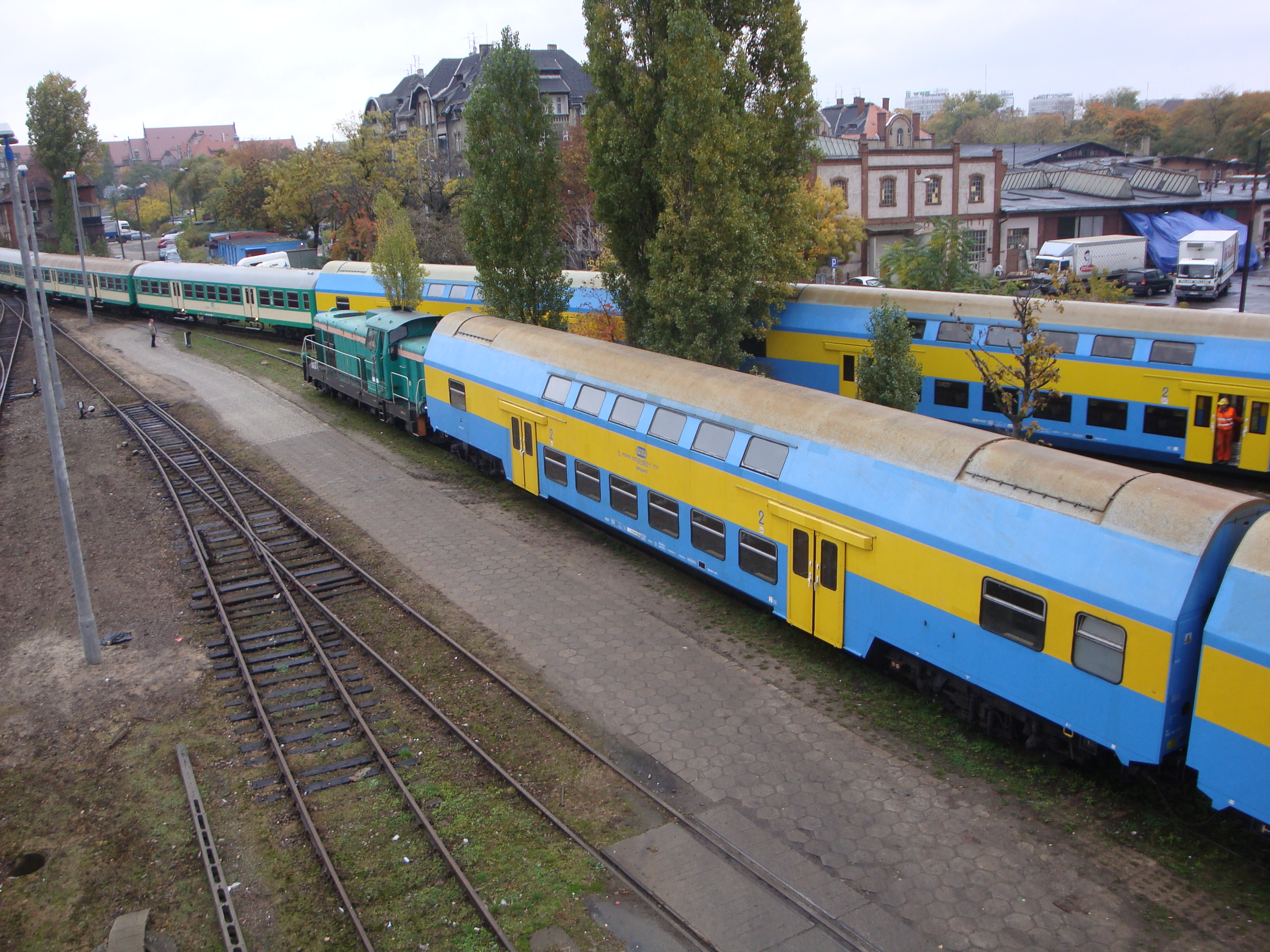
PKP/Polregio Bmnopux-type carriages at Poznań Główny (October 2008)

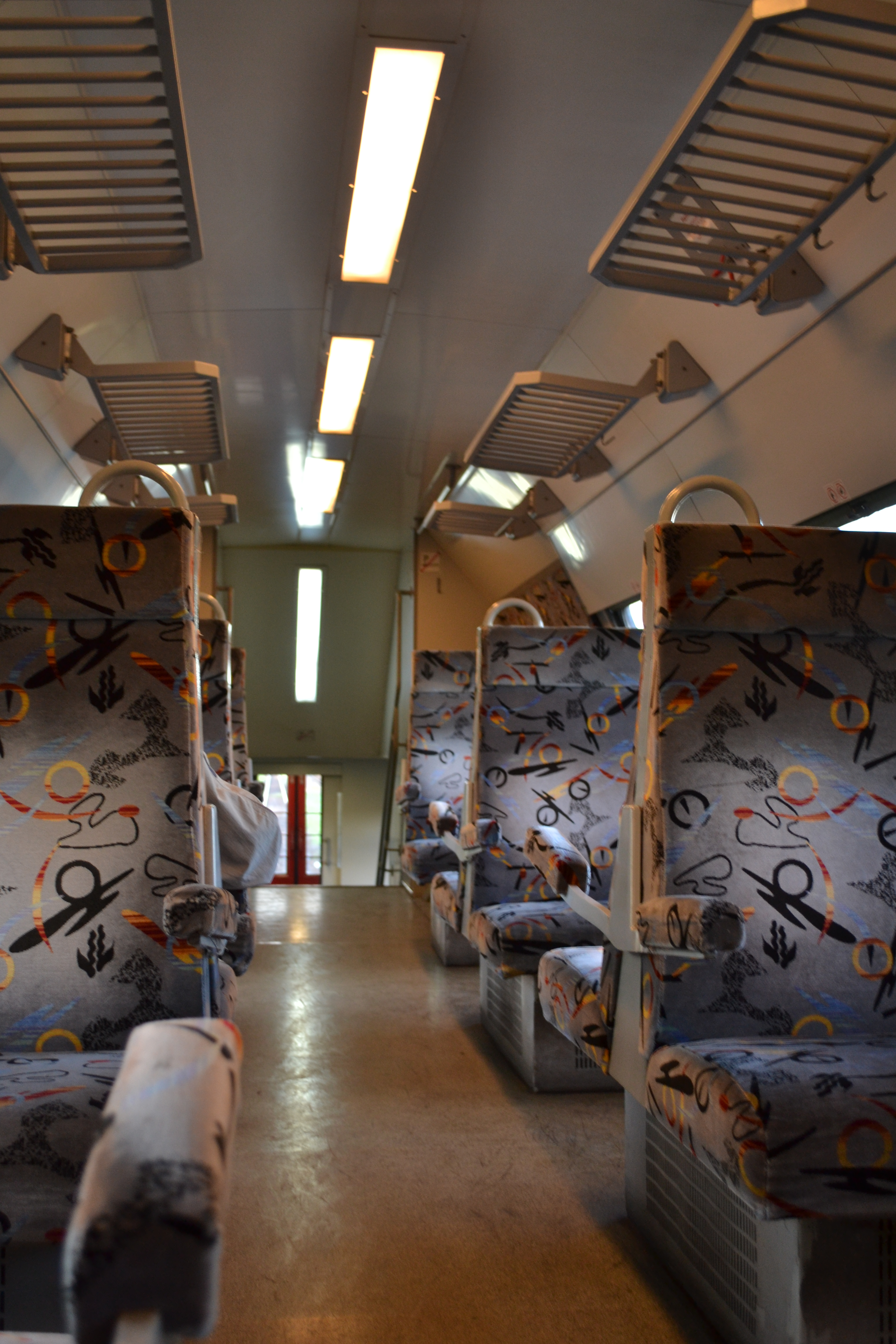
Interior of the upper deck of a modernised Bmnopux-type carriage (May 2012)

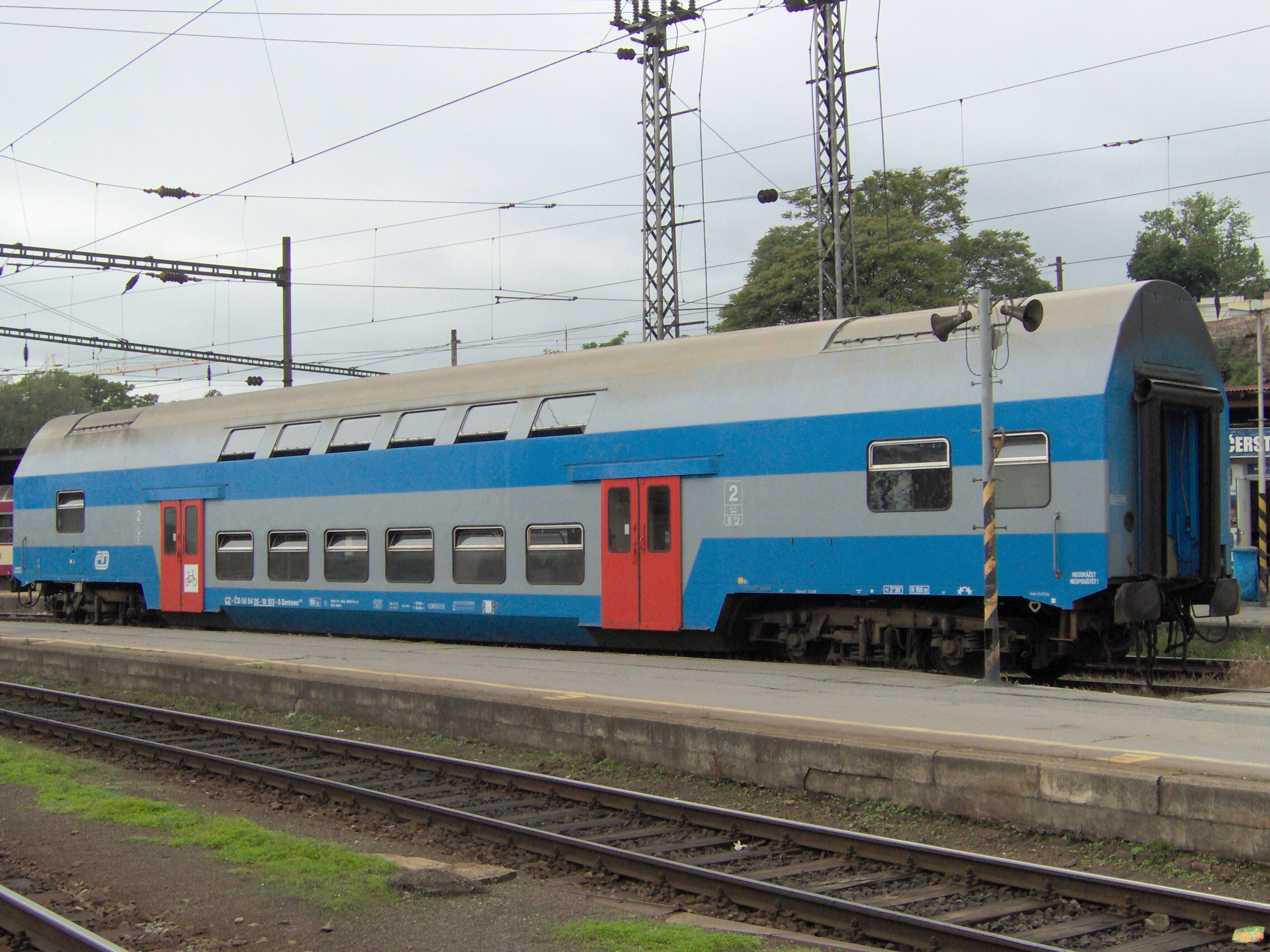
ČD Bmto292-type carriage at Brno hl.n (June 2010)

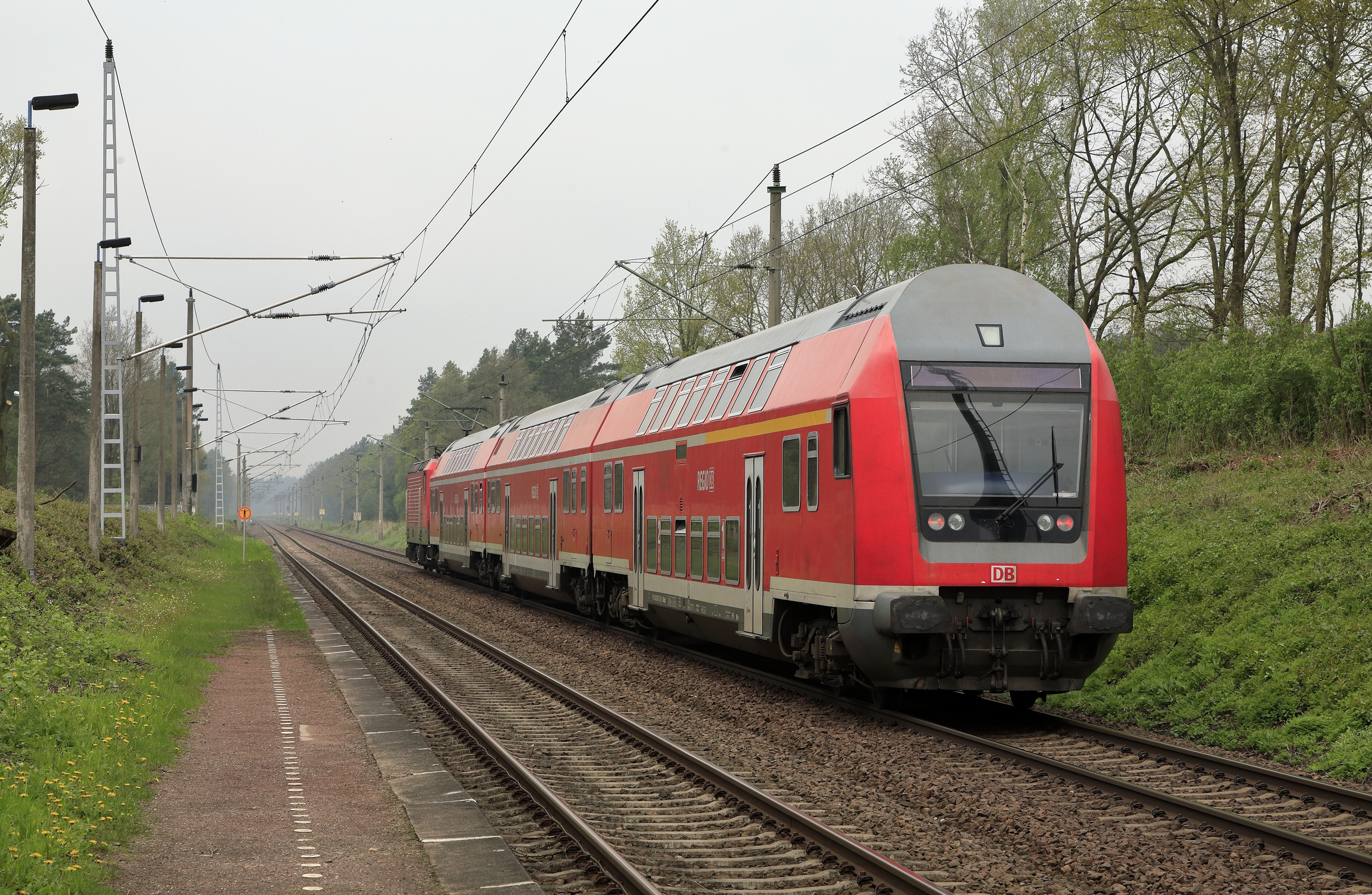
Refurbished Class 778 Doppelstockwagen rake with 4. Generation headshape in Klieken (May 2013)

German national railways
DB class	Vmax	count	UIC type	notes
777	120		DABbuzf	cab car
778	140		DABbuzf	cab car

== Second generation ==
Built 1992–1993 for Germany (Deutsche Reichsbahn and Deutsche Bundesbahn), later named DB Class 760.

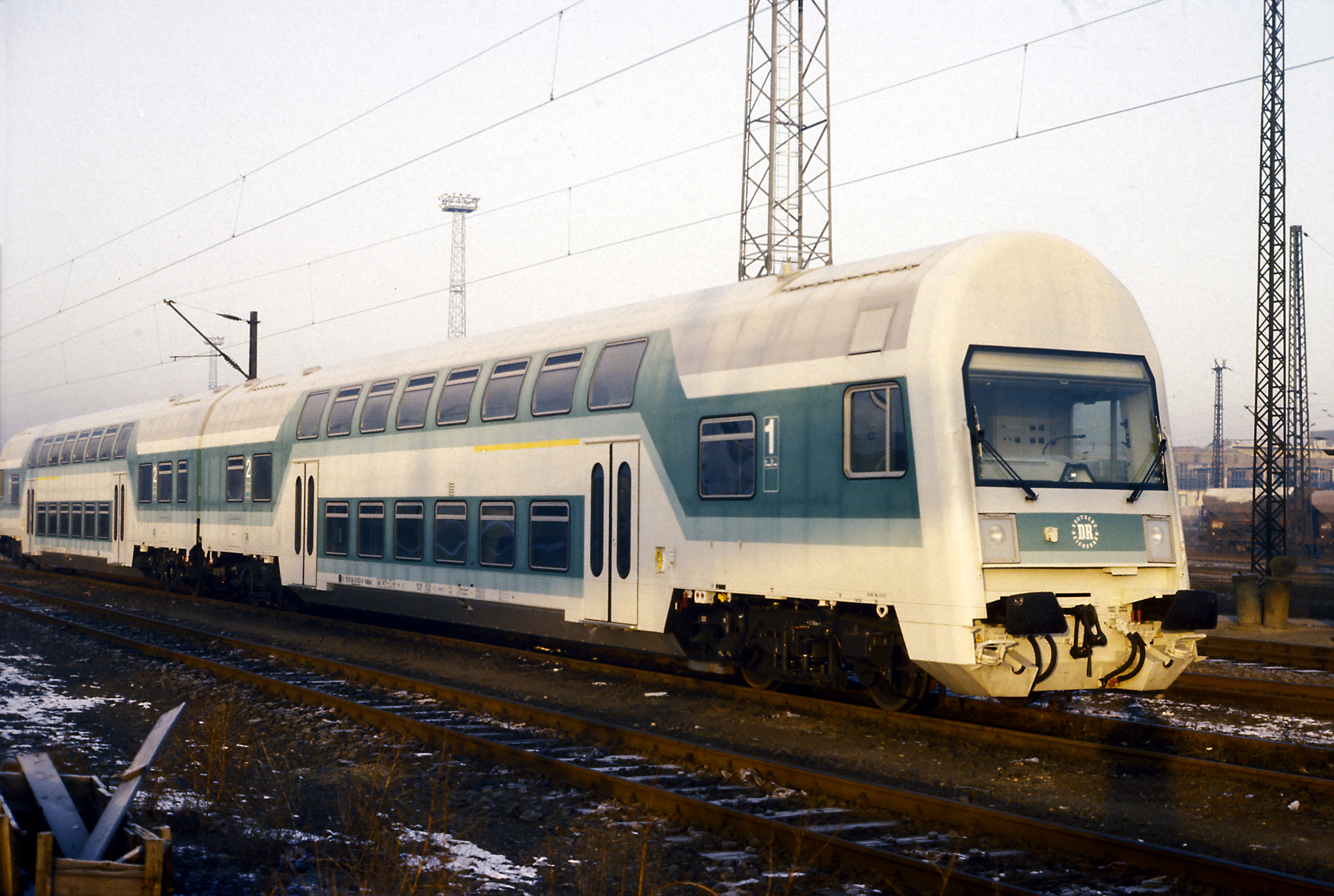
2. Generation Doppelstockwagen on first delivery (January 1993)

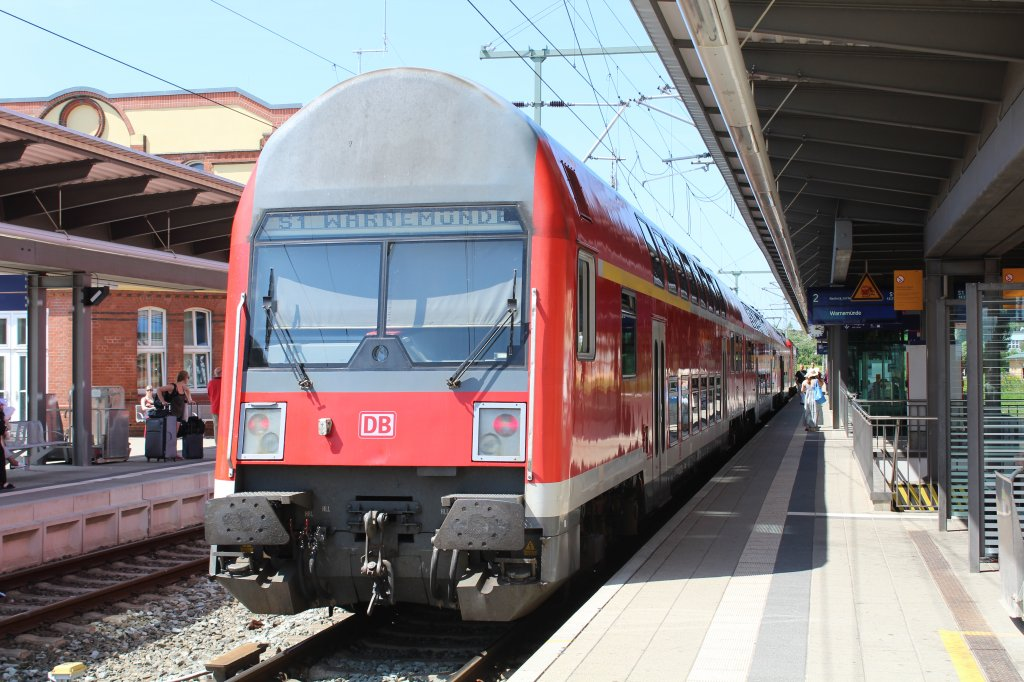
2. Generation Doppelstockwagen in DB Verkehrsrot colours on a Rostock S-Bahn service (July 2013)

German national railways
DB class	Vmax	count	UIC type	notes
760	140	100	DABbuzf	cab car

== Sleeping cars (Doppelstockschlafwagen) ==
Built 1992–1995 by DWA, Schindler Waggon, SIG Graz and Waggonfabrik Talbot for CityNightLine, also partially licensed NS DD-AR design from Talbot.

Two variants were built:

- WLBmz-type carriage consisting of 9 standard sleeping compartments on the upper deck and 8 standard sleeping compartments plus two 3-berth (originally 4-berth) compartments on the lower deck, all with washbasins inside compartments and shared toilets at each end of said carriage;
- WLABmz-type carriage consisting of 4 deluxe compartments with en-suite toilets and shower plus 1 standard sleeping compartment with washbasin inside compartment on the upper deck, and 8 standard sleeping compartments plus two 3-berth (originally 4-berth) compartments on the lower deck, with washbasins inside compartments and shared toilets at each end of said carriage.

All units were transferred to City Night Line of Deutsche Bahn in 2007 and then to ÖBB Nightjet in December 2016. As of 2023, the Doppelstockschlafwagen were mainly used on the routes Vienna–Zurich and Zurich–Hamburg.

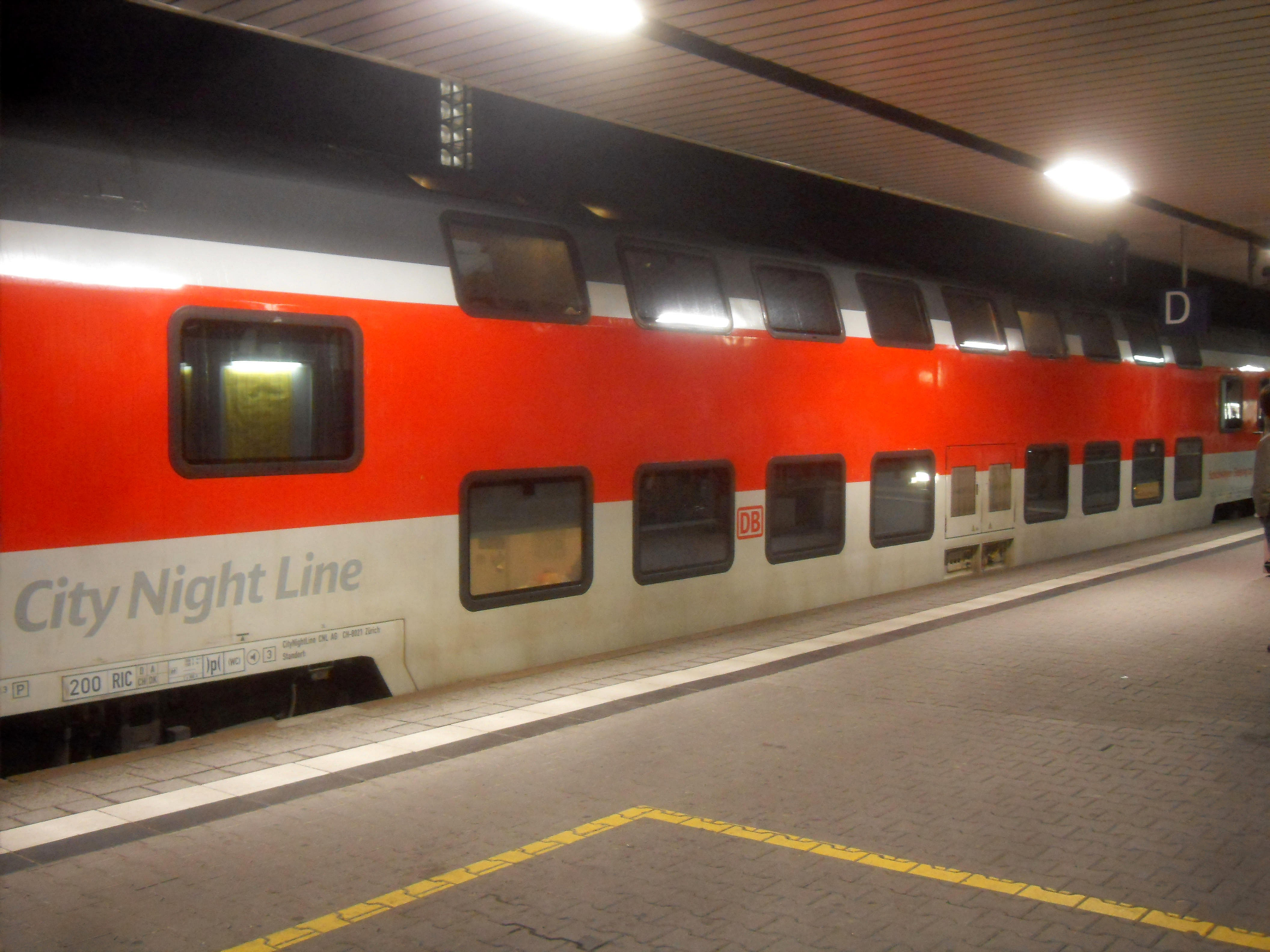
Exterior of a City Night Line WLBmz-type Doppelstockschlafwagen (sleeping compartments side) at Mannheim Hbf (March 2010)

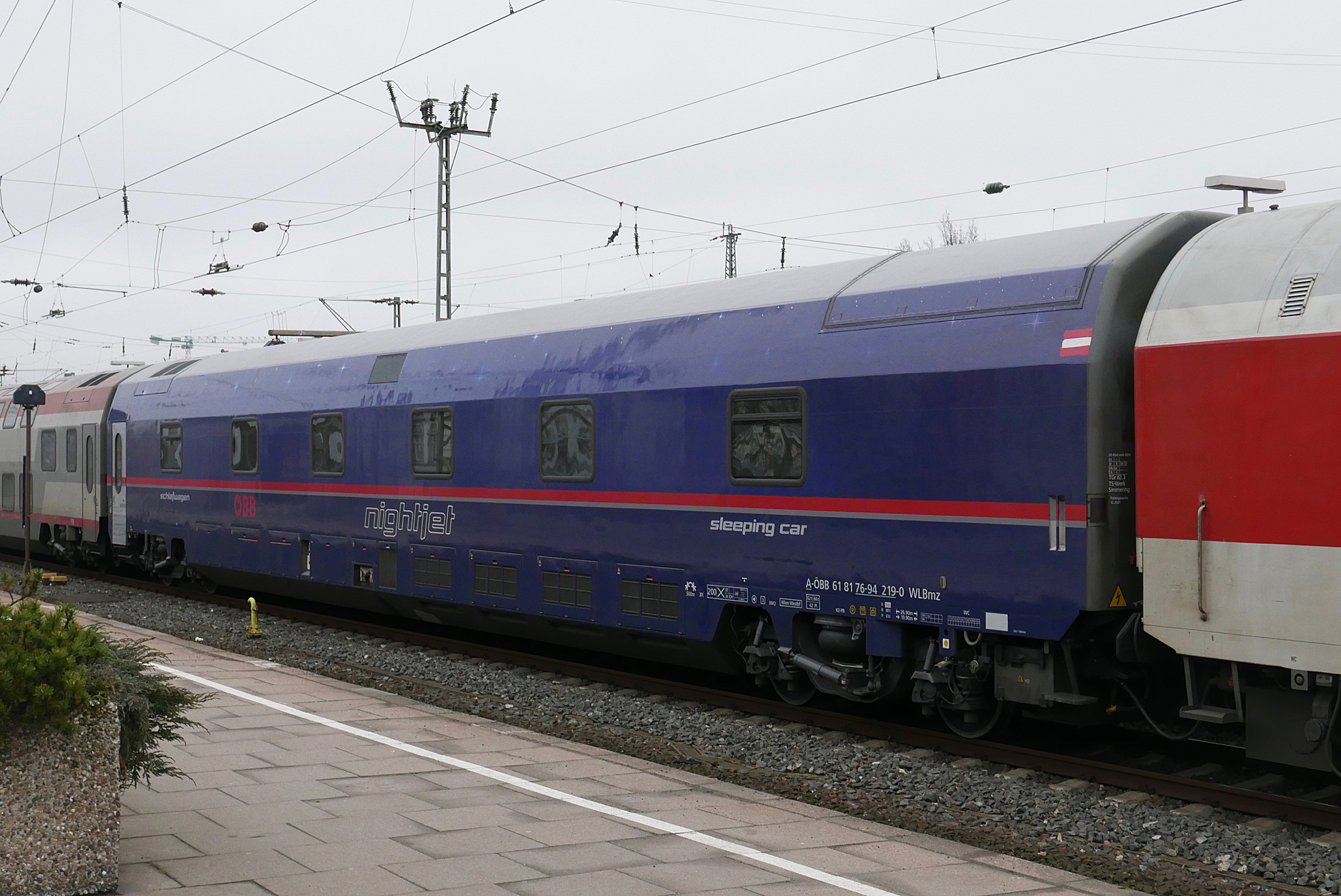
Exterior of a ÖBB Nightjet WLBmz-type Doppelstockschlafwagen (passenger corridor side) at Hamburg-Altona (February 2017)

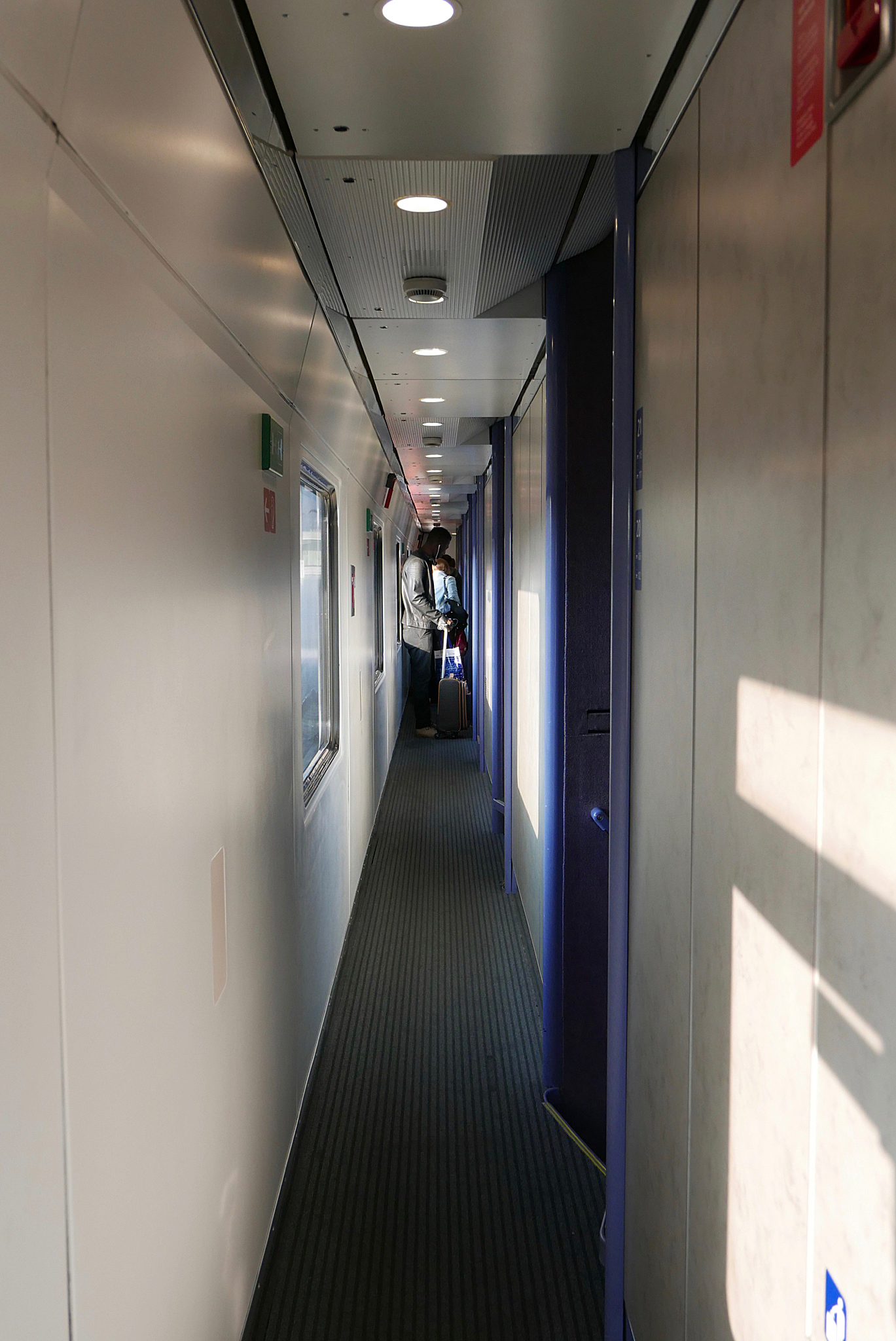
Passenger corridor of a ÖBB Nightjet WLBmz-type Doppelstockschlafwagen

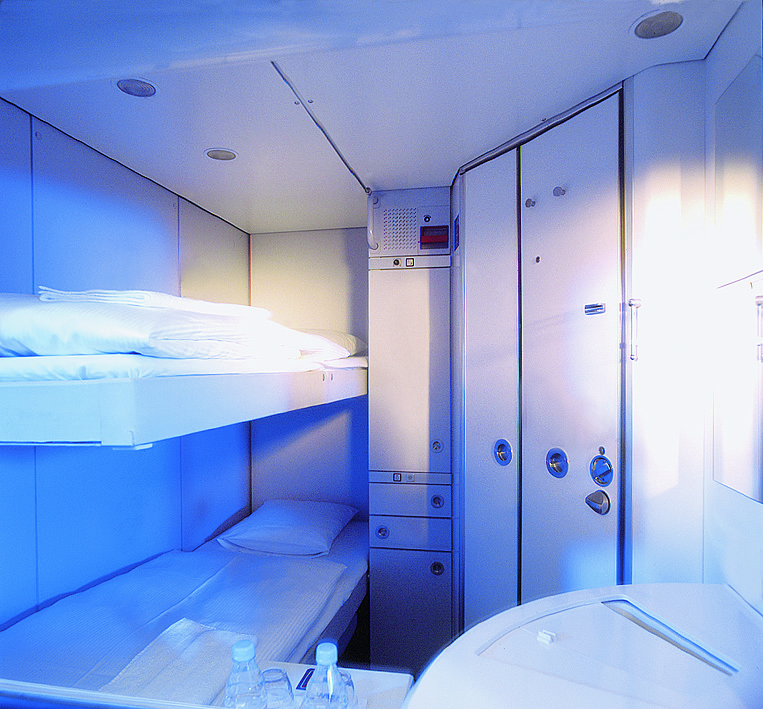
Second class Eco sleeping cabin on lower deck

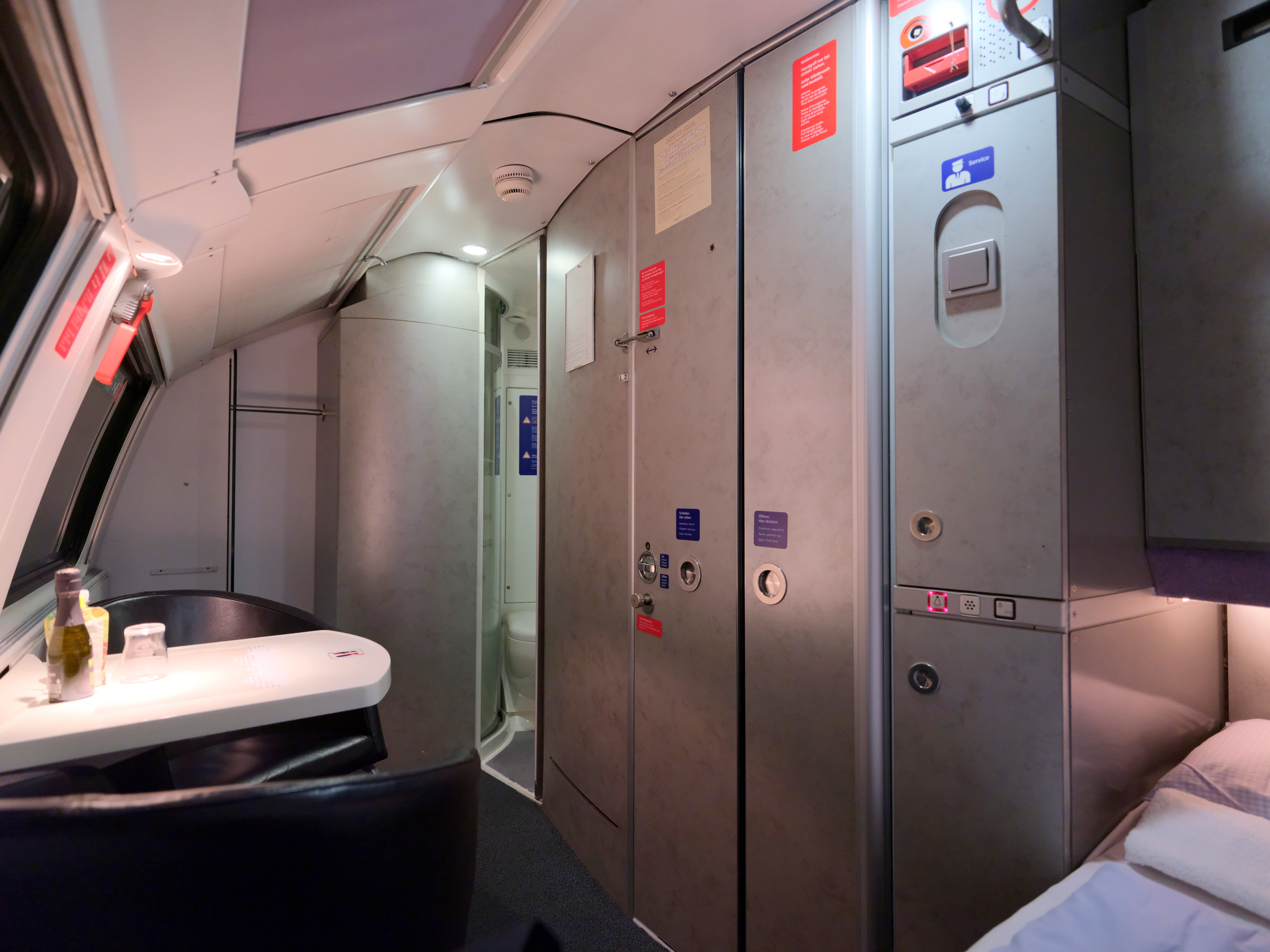
Deluxe sleeping compartment on upper deck (WLABmz only) with en-suite toilet and shower

== Third generation ==
Built 1994–1997 under the DWA brand for Germany (Deutsche Bahn).

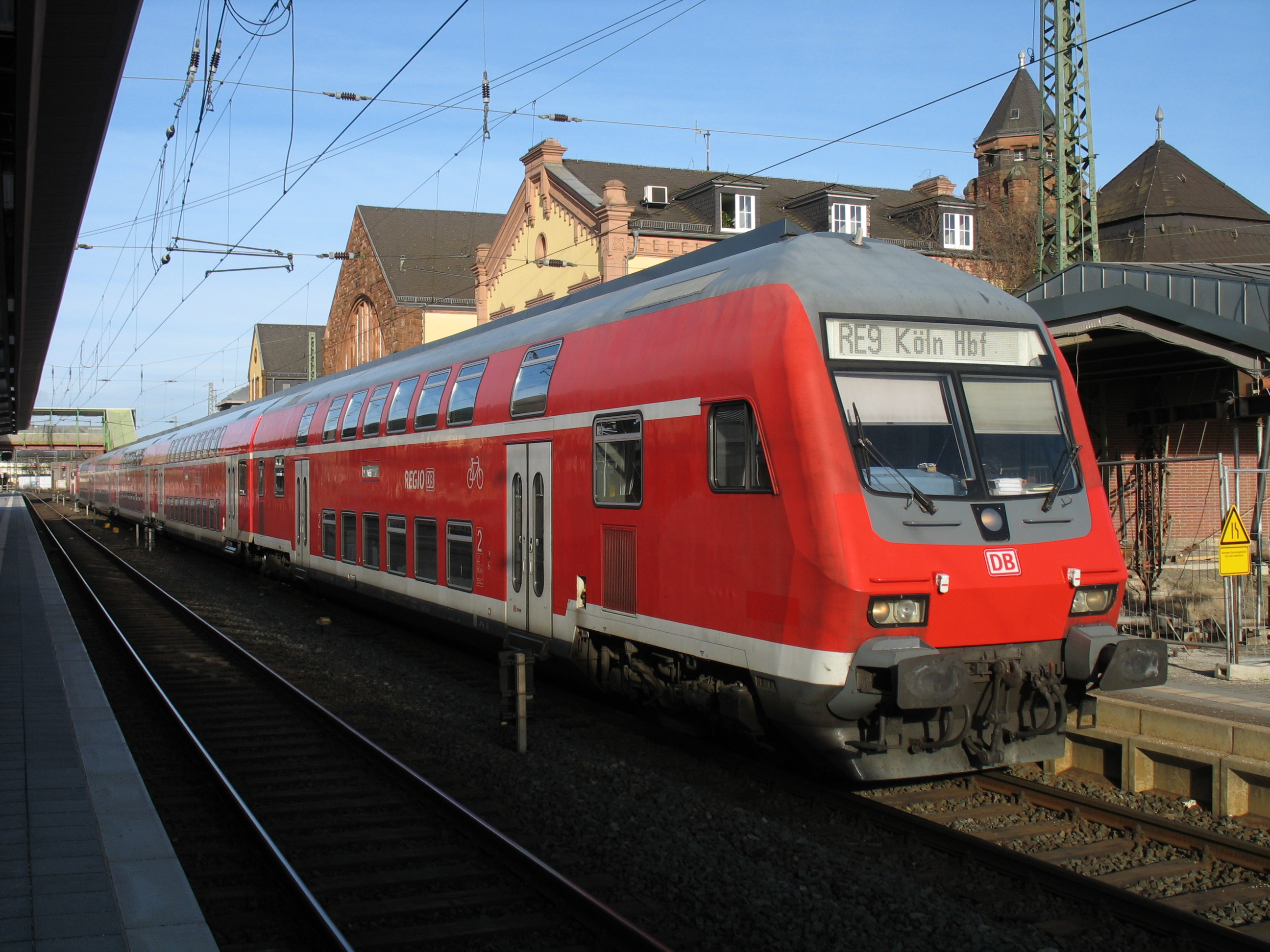
3. Generation Doppelstockwagen in Gießen

German national railways
DB class	Vmax	count	UIC type	notes
761	140	58	DABbzf	cab car
762	140	31	DABpbzf	cab car

== Fourth generation ==
Built since 1997 and sold under the Bombardier and Alstom brands to railways in Germany, Denmark, Israel and others.

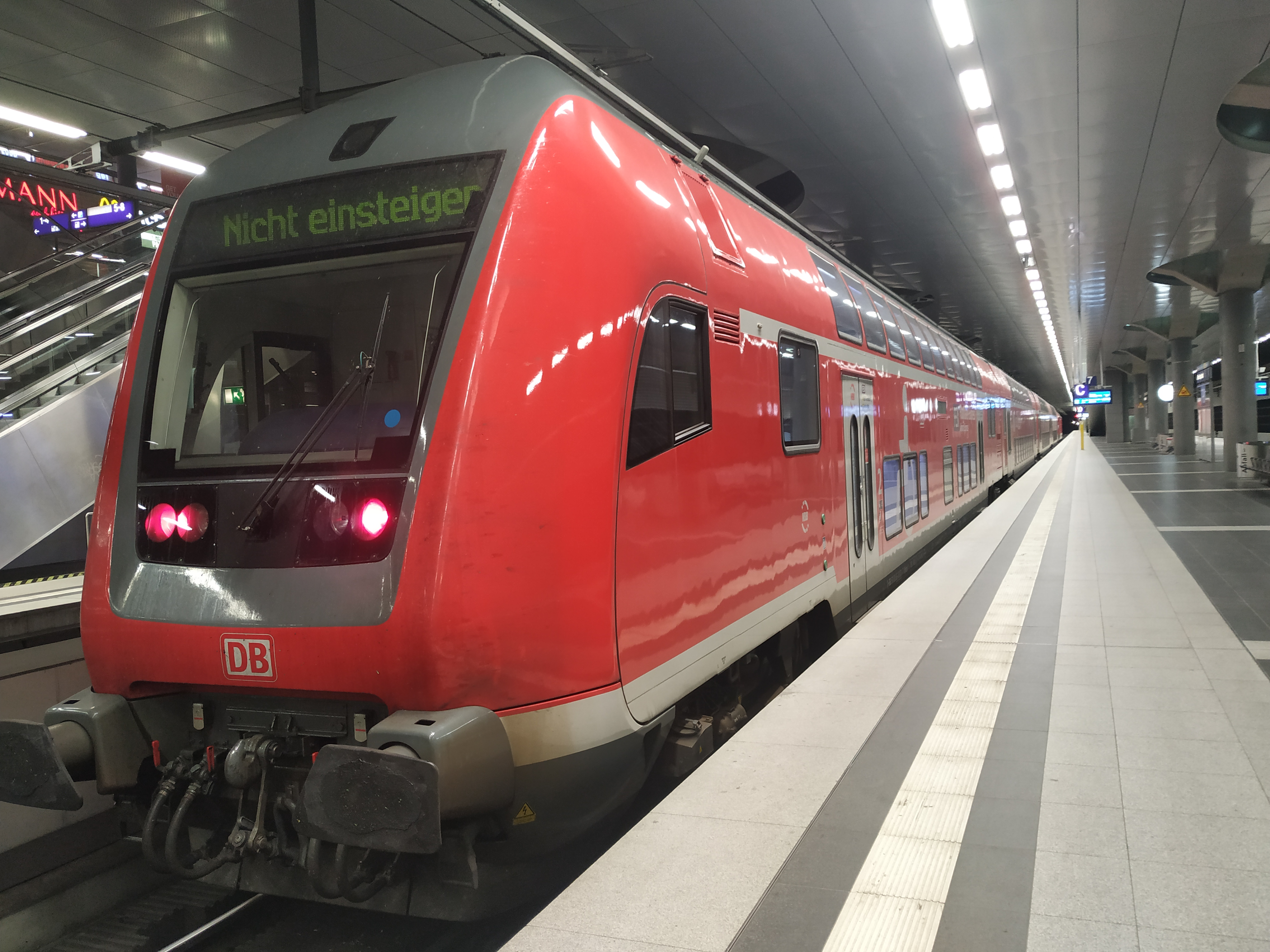
DB 4. Generation Doppelstockwagen at Berlin Hbf (tief)

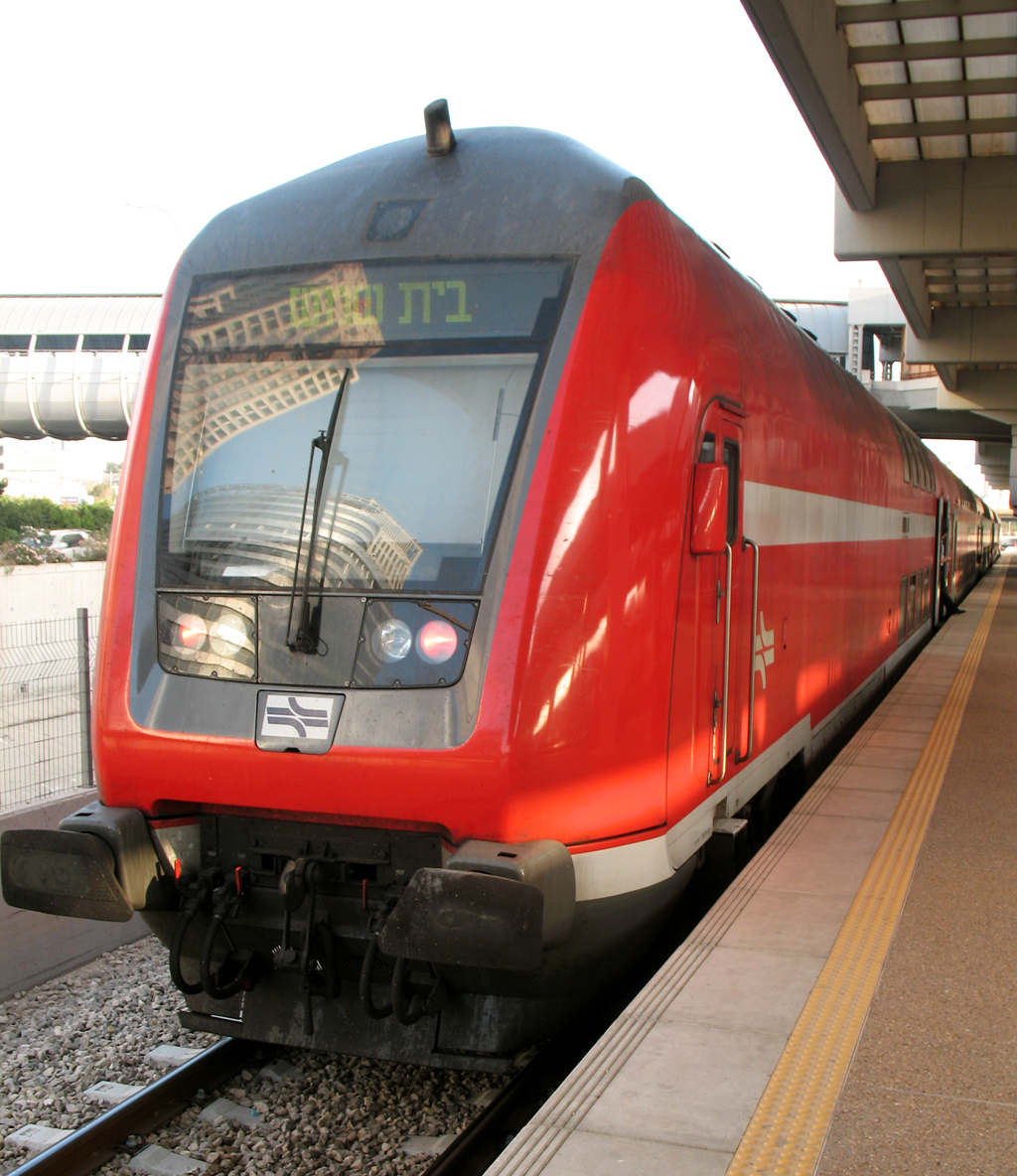
Israel Railways unit at Tel Aviv Savidor Central

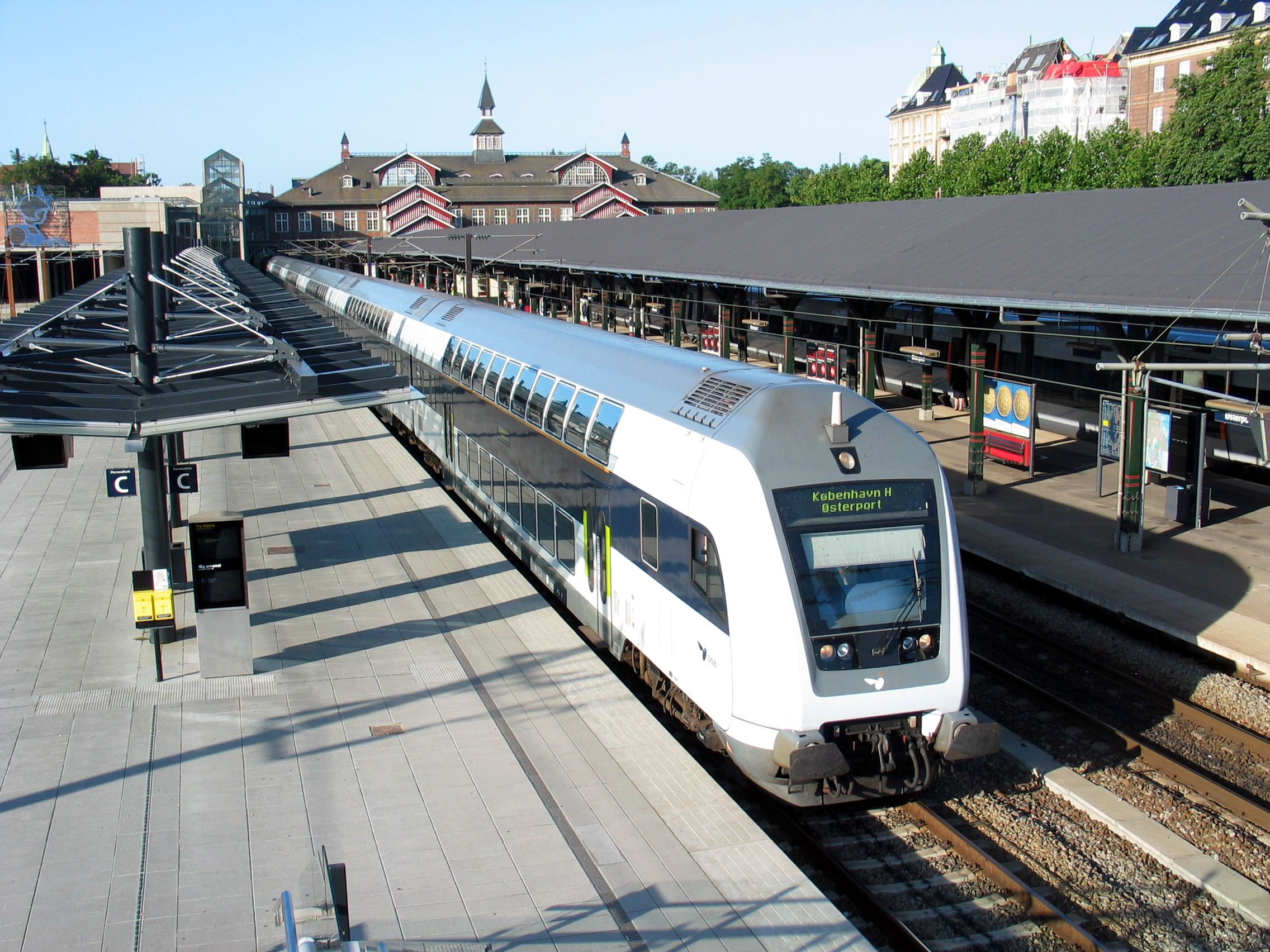
DSB unit at Østerport

German national railways
DB class	Vmax	count	UIC type	notes
763	160	50	DABpbzf	cab car (originally 140 km/h)
764	140	39	DABpbzf	cab car
765	160	55	DABpbzfa	cab car (originally 160 km/h)
766	160	55	DABpbzfa	cab car
767	160		DABpbzfa	cab car
Luxembourg National Railway Company
Class	Vmax	count	UIC type	notes
Dosto	160	20		cab car
Dosto	160	15		first/second class car
Dosto	160	52		second class car
Danish State Railways
Class	Vmax	count	UIC type	notes
ABs	160	25		Cab car; First/second class car with room for bicycles
B	160	62		Second class car
Bk	160	26		Second class car with vending machine
Israel Railways
Class	Vmax	count	UIC type	notes
PC-103	140 (later upgraded to 160)	24		Driving- and generator trailer
PC-103	140 (later upgraded to 160)	7		Driving- and generator trailer
TC-101	140 (later upgraded to 160)	68		second class car
TC-101	140 (later upgraded to 160)	18		second class car
TC-101	140 (later upgraded to 160)	82		second class car
?	160	78		Ordered in 2010
?	160	72		Ordered in 2012

== Fifth generation ==
In 2008, Bombardier presented the "Dosto 2010" future family of double-deck trains for the German market. For international sales they were branded as Bombardier TWINDEXX with a "Vario" concept (then called TWINDEXX Vario) that allows these trains to be built for regional or intercity connections with a design speed of 189 km/h (117 mph) and an operational speed of up to 160 km/h (100 mph). Deutsche Bahn (DB) and other German operators currently operate 404 TWINDEXX Vario carriages, classified as DBAG Class 445/446, which entered service in 2017 after a delay of three years, replacing many locomotive-hauled rakes. Israel Railways has also ordered 443 TWINDEXX Vario carriages between 2010 and 2019 to support its expanding rail network, the last of which was delivered in December 2021.

The high-speed rail versions are branded TWINDEXX Express, designed for 230 km/h (143 mph). A tilting EMU variant of the Twindexx with an operational speed of up to 200 km/h (125 mph) is developed for the Swiss Federal Railways (SBB), classified as SBB RAB(D)e 502, nicknamed FV-Dosto and informally called TWINDEXX Swiss Express. Orders have been placed in the range of a few hundred coaches of the different variants with their initial delivery originally to be around 2013, then delayed to 2015–2017 and eventually 2018–2022, depending on the variant. These delays have been attributed to the need to redesign the trains to properly comply with Swiss disability access legislation after a lawsuit was filed against Bombardier and SBB by two Swiss disability-rights organisations at the Federal Administrative Court of Switzerland in 2012, as well as problems with the composting toilet tanks and the tilting mechanisms. In 2022, SBB decided to permanently discontinue the use of the tilting mechanism on their FV-Dosto trains. A revised model without tilting capabilities re-entered service in 2026 and the same modifications are planned for all 62 units.

The National Railway Company of Belgium (NMBS/SNCB) has similarly ordered TWINDEXX-derived intercity trains designated as M7 in 2018, constructed at the former BN factory at Bruges, which entered service in January 2020.

In 2007, Koleje Mazowieckie of Poland signed a contract for the delivery of 37 Twindexx Vario wagons (11 steering and 26 trailing wagons). The centre wagons were delivered in August and the steering wagons in December 2008. Initially, the wagons were pulled by EU07 locomotives. The wagons are currently operated by Koleje Mazowieckie together with TRAXX P160DC and Pesa Gama locomotives, sometimes also in multiple working with Pesa Sundeck bilevel coaches.

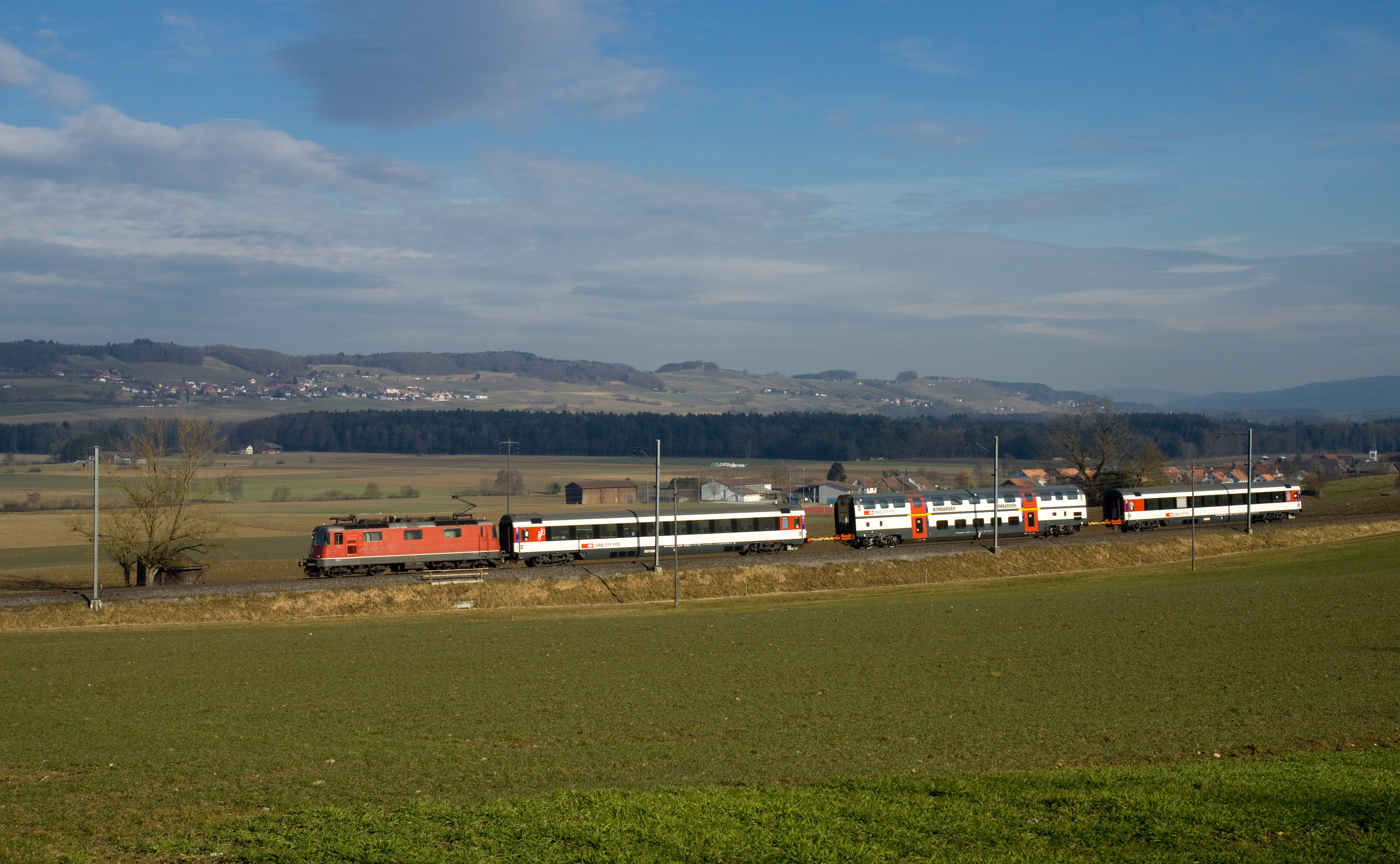
test run of tilting double-deck coach pulled by a regular train

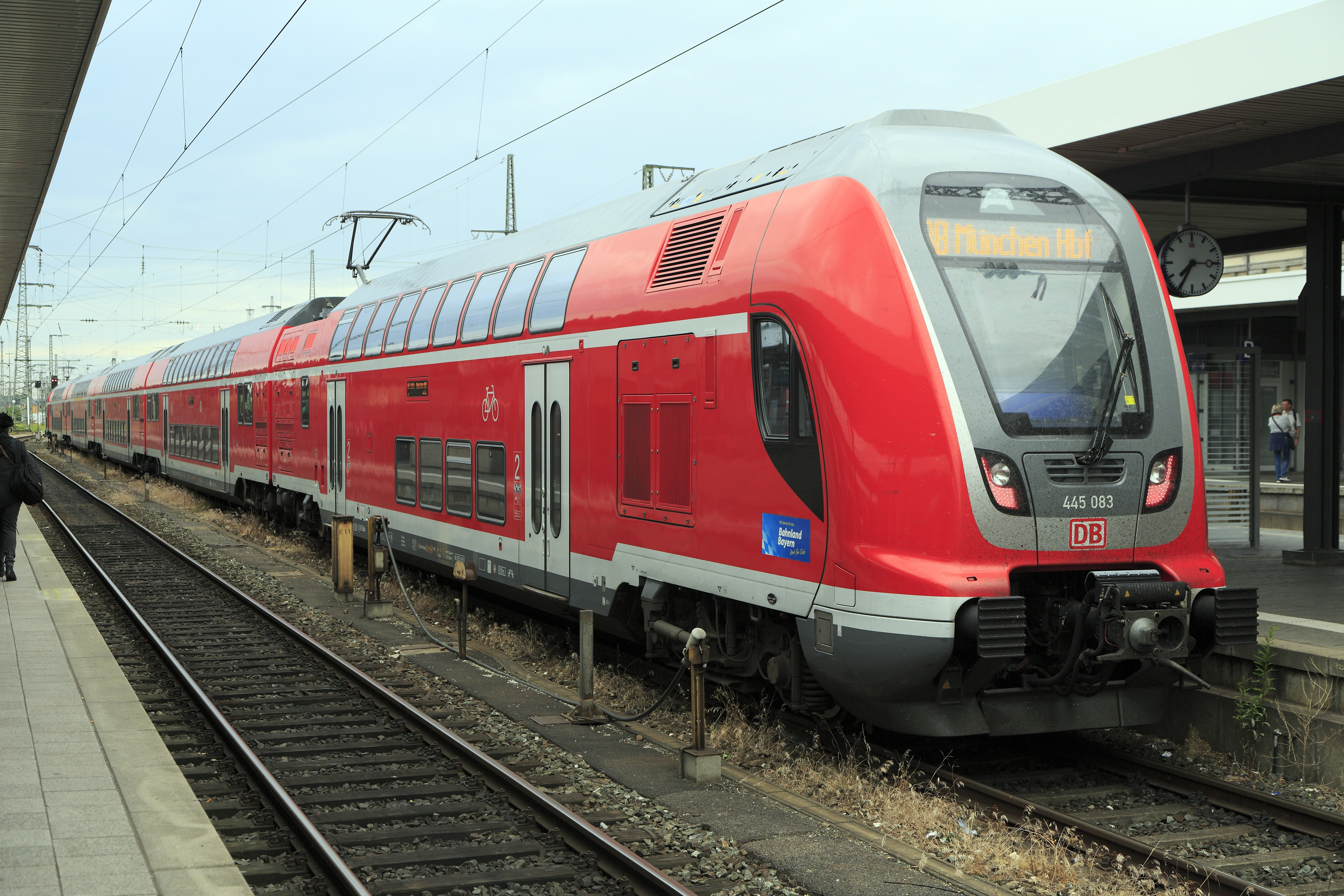
DBAG Class 445/446 at Nürnberg Hbf (June 2019)

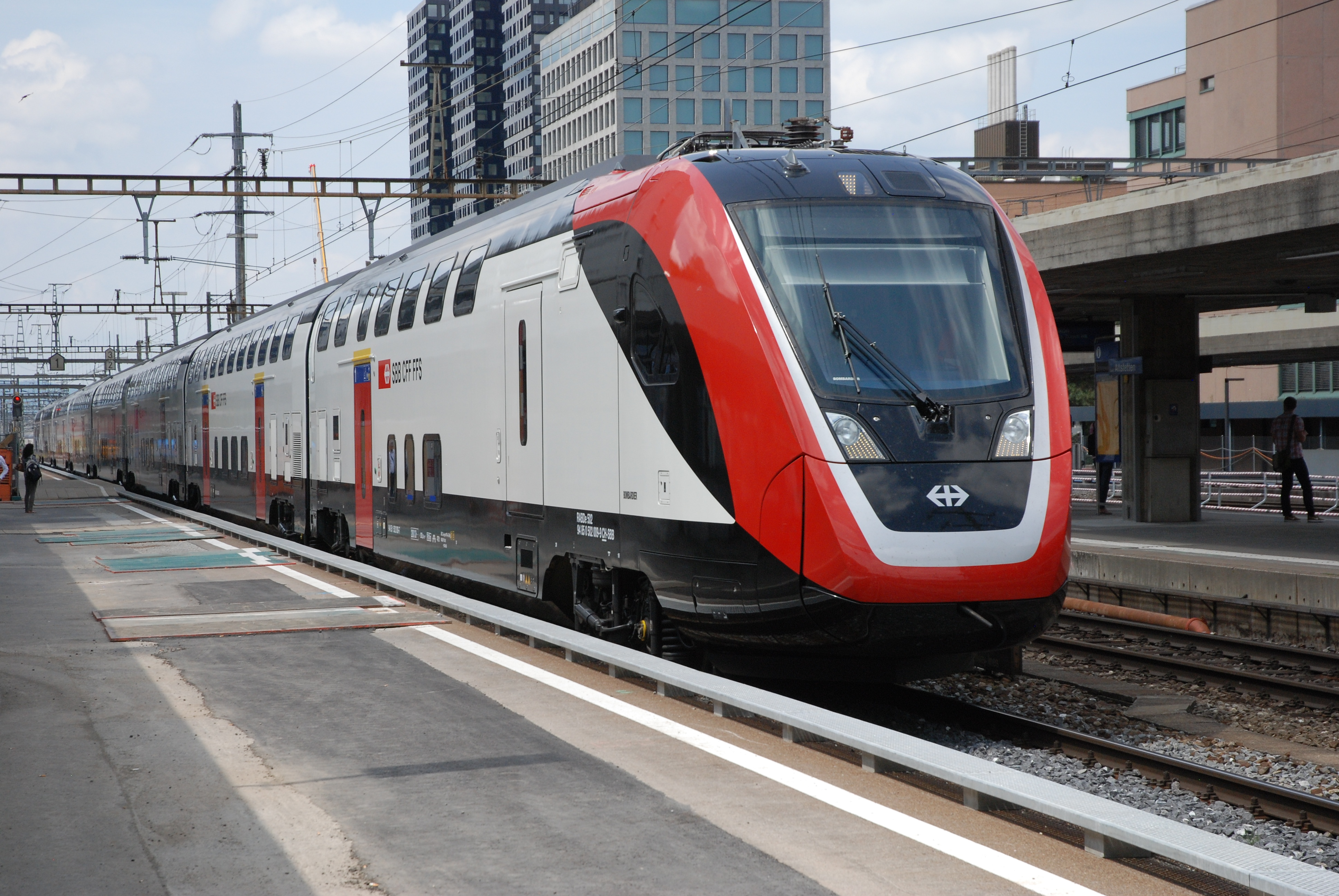
SBB RABDe 502 tilting double-deck coach TWINDEXX Swiss Express

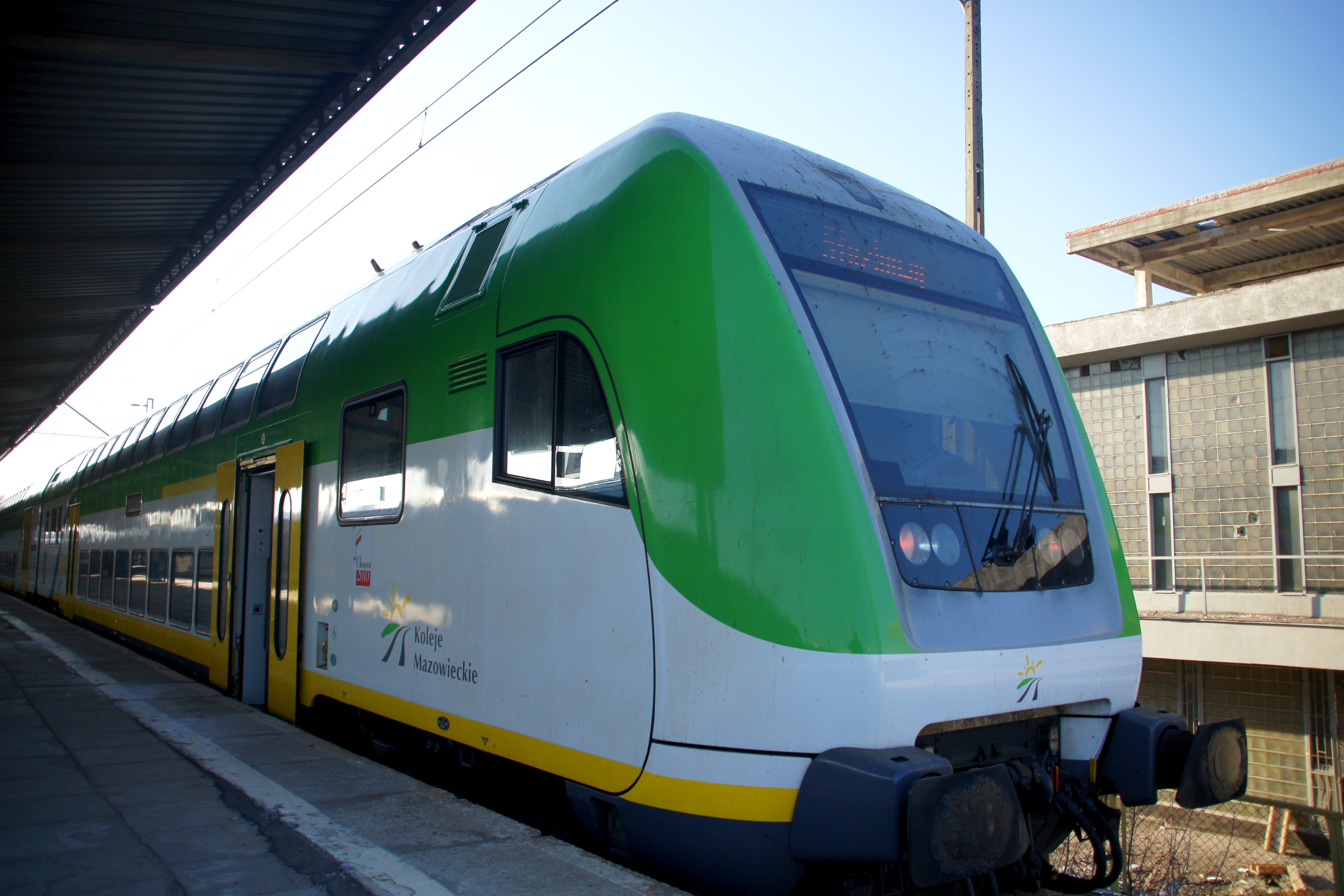
Koleje Mazowieckie Twindexx Vario control car

Israel Railways
Class	Vmax	count	UIC type	notes
?	160	60		Ordered in 2016
?	160	33		Ordered in 2017
?	160	48		Ordered in late 2017. (electric only)
?	160	74		Ordered in May 2019. (electric only)

== See also ==
- DB Class 670 – a double-decker diesel railbus manufactured by DWA
