= Disability Discrimination Act (Switzerland) =

Swiss law prohibiting discrimination against people with disabilities

Disability Discrimination Act (DDA)

Federal Assembly of Switzerland
- Long title: Federal Act on the Elimination of Discrimination against People with Disabilities (SR 151.3)
- Territorial extent: Switzerland
- Enacted by: Federal Assembly of Switzerland
- Enacted: 13 December 2002
- Commenced: 1 January 2004
- Status: Current legislation

The Disability Discrimination Act (DDA) (Note: German: Behindertengleichstellungsgesetz, BehiG; French: Loi sur l’égalité pour les handicapés, LHand; Italian: Legge sui disabili, LDis) is a Swiss federal law that prohibits discrimination against people with disabilities. It also establishes the Federal Bureau for the Equality of Persons with Disabilities.

The law was adopted on 13 December 2002 by the Federal Assembly and came into force on 1 January 2004.

== Origin ==
In 1998, the federal popular initiative "Equal rights for people with disabilities" was launched and submitted on 14 June 14 1999. It demanded the anchoring of a new Article 4bis in the Swiss Federal Constitution to prohibit discrimination on the grounds of disability. In addition, it provided for an obligation on the part of the legislature to eliminate discrimination against people with disabilities.

At the same time, the Federal Assembly had approved two specific provisions on the equal treatment of persons with disabilities in article 8 of the total revision of the constitution. They were adopted together with the new constitution in the referendum of 18 April 1999, and entered into force on 1 January 2000. Article 8 paragraph 2 states: "No person may be discriminated against (...) because of a physical, mental or psychological disability".

To implement this legislative mandate, the Disability Discrimination Act (DDA) was approved on 13 December 2002. It came into force on 1 January 2004. The popular initiative was rejected in a referendum on May 18, 2003

== Main provisions ==
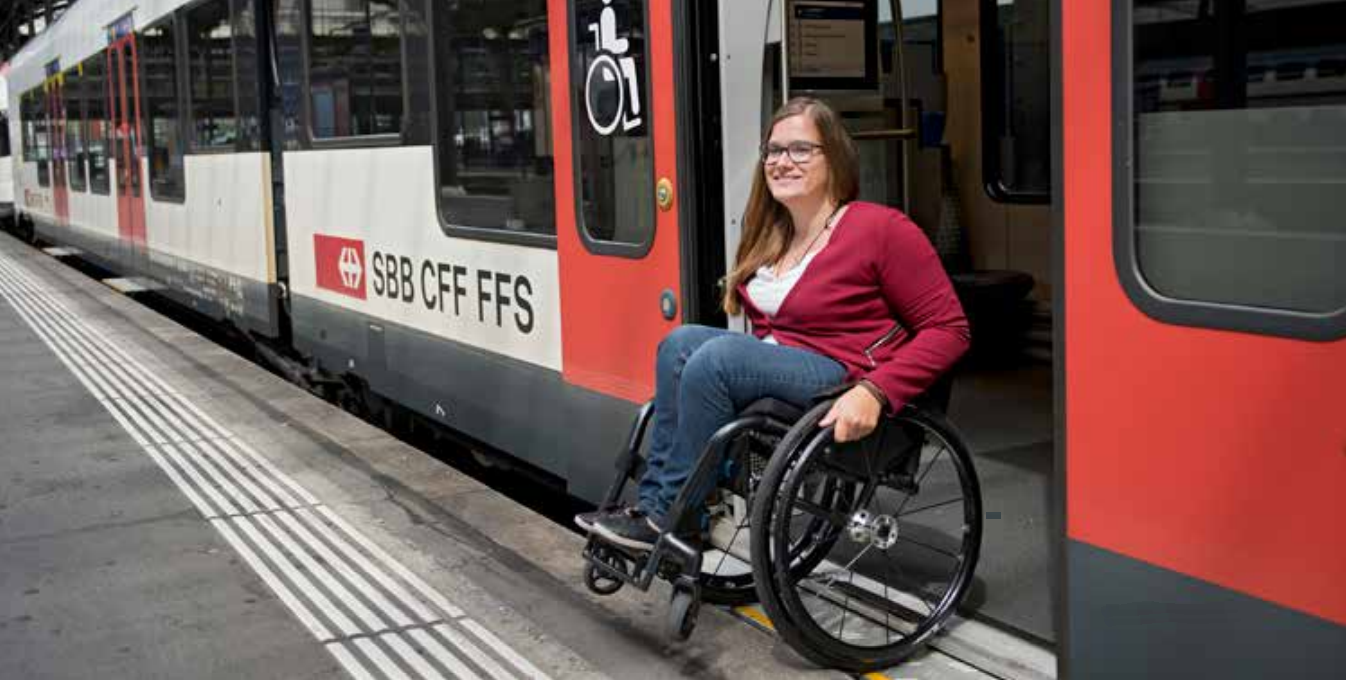
The DDA enables disabled people to use public transport independently. Wheelchair user leaving an SBB train

The DDA contains requirements that make it easier for people with disabilities to participate in social life. It "has the purpose of preventing, reducing or eliminating discrimination against people with disabilities" (art. 1 par. 1). This prohibition of discrimination applies to publicly accessible buildings and facilities, to residential buildings with more than eight residential units, to businesses with more than 50 workplaces, to public transport, employment relationships under public law, and to services provided by the federal government, the cantons and concessionary companies, as well as to education.

The prohibition of discrimination can be enforced to the extent that the principle of proportionality is not violated. A balancing of interests must be carried out. In doing so, it must be examined whether the expected benefit for people with disabilities is greater than the economic expense, the interests of nature and heritage protection or traffic and operational safety.

The law does not require that private companies also take special measures to provide their services without discrimination against persons with disabilities. They are only prohibited from discriminating against people with disabilities. In such a case, affected persons or organizations of persons with disabilities may claim compensation up to a maximum of 5,000 Swiss francs.

It also provides for the possibility that the federal government may financially support projects to promote equality.

== Implementation ==
As of January 2023, critics claim that the implementation has not yet progressed as far as the law requires. Inclusion Handicap, the umbrella organization of disability organizations in Switzerland, therefore wants to push it forward with individual lawsuits.

== Bureau for the Equality of Persons with Disabilities ==
Article 19 establishes the Federal Bureau for the Equality of Persons with Disabilities (Note: German: Eidgenössisches Büro für die Gleichstellung von Menschen mit Behinderungen, EBGB; French: Bureau fédéral de l'égalité pour les personnes handicapées, BFEH; Italian: Ufficio federale per le pari opportunità delle persone con disabilità, UFPD), responsible for the financial support of projects in the field of disability equality. It examines, accompanies and evaluates the projects. The bureau provides information on the DDA, commissions analyses and studies in the field of equality and integration, and coordinates the activities of public bodies and private organizations active in this field.

== Ordinances ==
Three ordinances concretize the DDA:

- Disability Equality Ordinance (Note: German: Behindertengleichstellungsverordnung, BehiV; French: Ordonnance sur l’égalité pour les handicapés, OHand; Italian: Ordinanza sui disabili, ODis) of 19 November 2003 (SR 151.31)
- Ordinance on the Design of Public Transport for the Disabled (Note: German: Verordnung über die behindertengerechte Gestaltung des öffentlichen Verkehrs, VböV; French: Ordonnance sur les aménagements visant à assurer l’accès des personnes handicapées aux transports publics, OTHand; Italian: Ordinanza concernente la concezione di una rete di trasporti pubblici conforme alle esigenze dei disabili, OTDis) of 12 November 2003 (SR 151.34)
- Ordinance on the technical requirements for the disabled-friendly design of public transport (Note: German: Verordnung des UVEK über die technischen Anforderungen an die behindertengerechte Gestaltung des öffentlichen Verkehrs, VAböV; French: Ordonnance du DETEC du 22 mai 2006 concernant les exigences techniques sur les aménagements visant à assurer l'accès des personnes handicapées aux transports publics, OETHand; Italian: Ordinanza del DATEC del 22 maggio 2006 concernente i requisiti tecnici per una rete di trasporti pubblici conforme alle esigenze dei disabili, ORTDis) of 22 May 2006 (SR 151.342)
