= CFL Class 4000 =

Class 4000
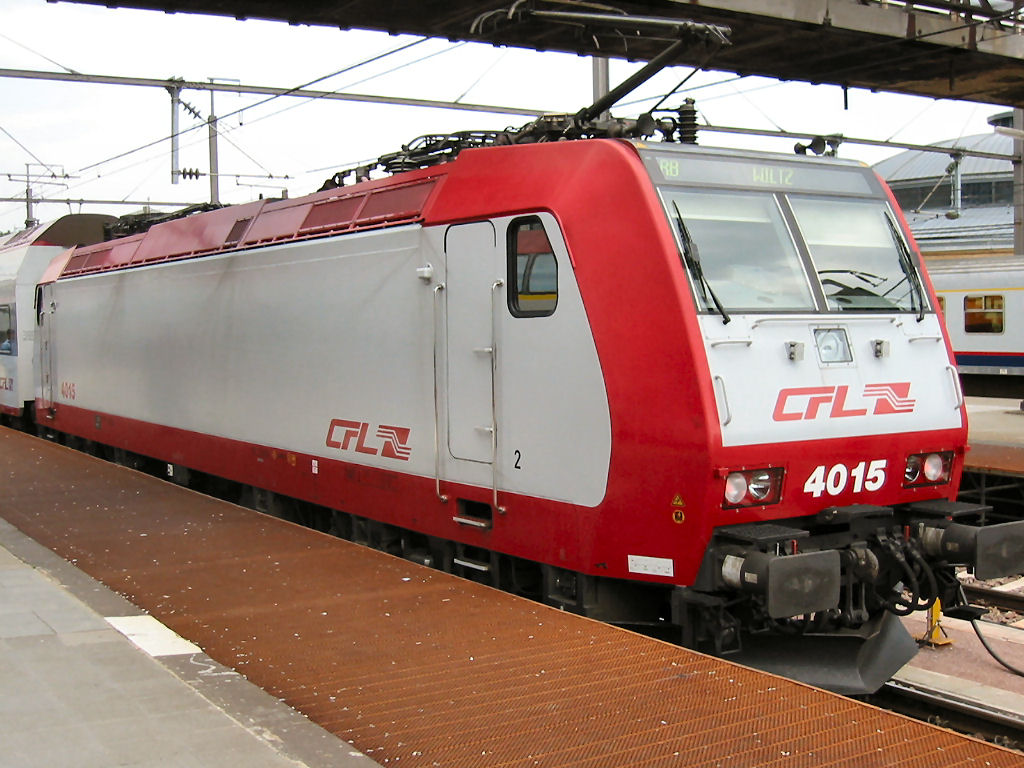
- CFL loco 4015 in Luxembourg station, 2 June 2007.
Type and origin
- Power type: Electric
- Builder: Bombardier
- Build date: 2004–2005
- Total produced: 20
Specifications
- Configuration
  - AAR: B-B
  - UIC: Bo′Bo′
- Gauge: 1,435 mm (4 ft 8 1/2 in)
- Length: 18.9 m (62 ft 0 in)
- Axle load: 21 tonnes (21 long tons; 23 short tons)
- Loco weight: 84 tonnes (83 long tons; 93 short tons)
- Electric system/s: 25 kV 50 Hz AC; 15 kV 16.7 Hz AC
- Current pickup: Pantograph
Performance figures
- Maximum speed: 140 km/h (87 mph)
- Power output: 5,600 kW (7,500 hp)
Career
- Operators: CFL
- Class: 4000
- Number in class: 20
- Numbers: 4001–4020
- Official name: TRAXX
- Locale: Luxembourg
- Delivered: 2004-2005
- Disposition: in service

The CFL class 4000 is a variant of the Bombardier TRAXX locos found working across Europe. Within Luxembourg they work on the local passenger services, crossing the borders into France or Belgium as necessary. They also work freight traffic. Their 15 kV capability allows them to work across the border to Germany. Even though they are capable of running in France, they are not allowed to do so for security reasons.

Their slab sided body work has been used for advertising.

Along with the Bombardier bilevel cars that they pull, the Class 4000 are due to be replaced by electric multiple units by 2030.

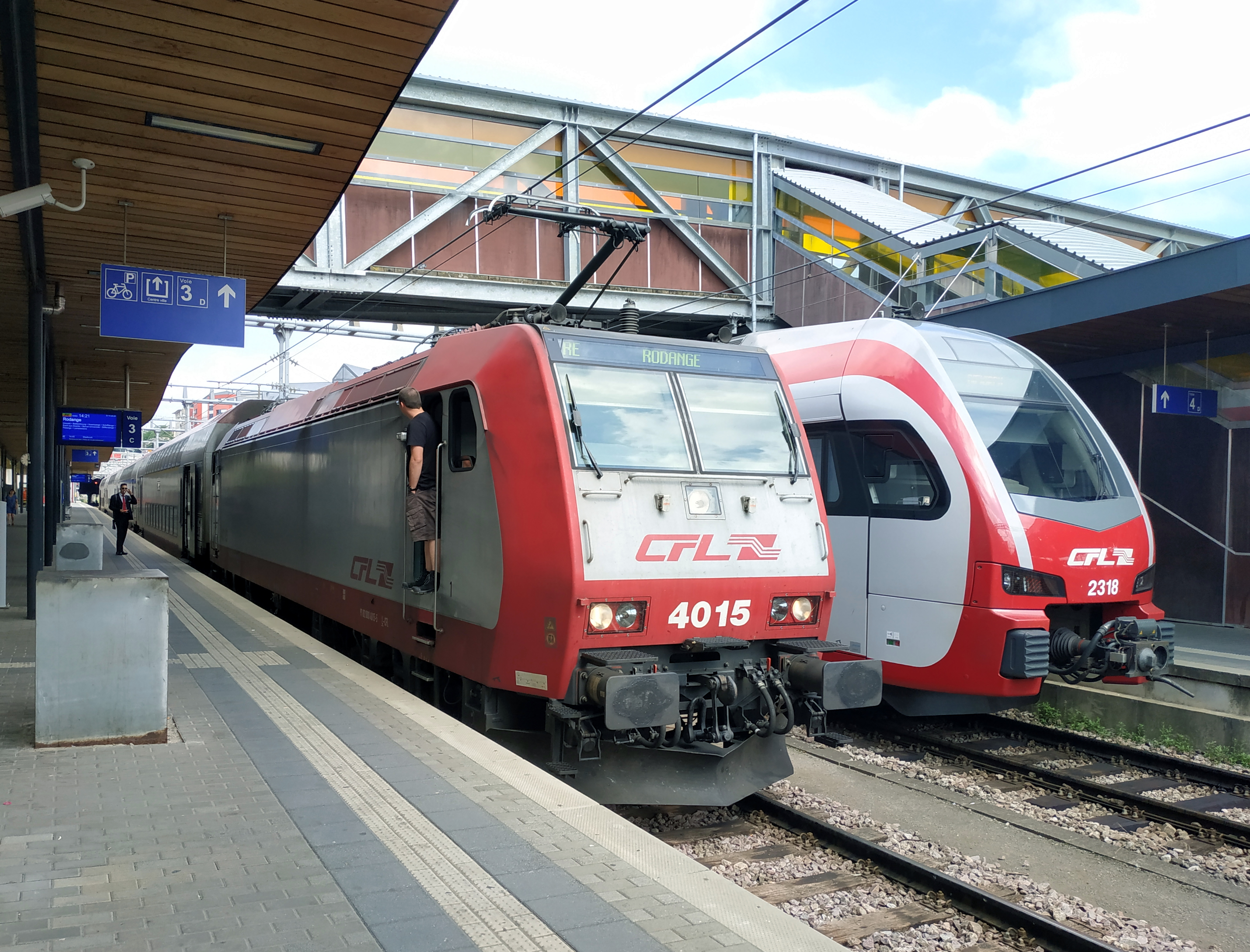
4015 in 2019
