= Polonia (train) =

Austrian–Czech–Polish international train service

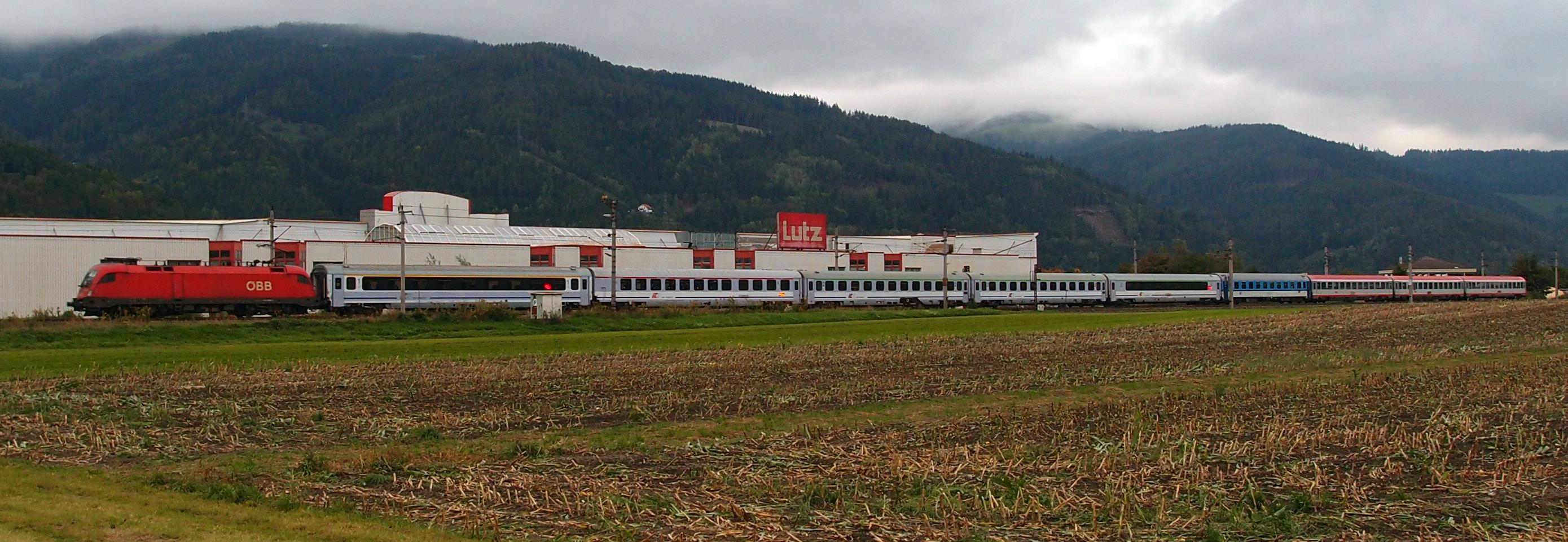

Overview
- Service type: EuroCity (EC)
- Status: Operational
- Locale: Austria; Czech Republic; Poland
- First service: 1997
- Current operators: PKP, ČD, ÖBB

Route
- Termini: Wien Westbahnhof / Villach Hbf; Warszawa Wschodnia
- Distance travelled: 991 km (616 mi)
- Average journey time: 12 h 16 min
- Service frequency: Daily
- Train numbers: EC 102/103 (Austria, Czech republic); EIC 102/103 (Poland)

On-board services
- Class(es): first and second class
- Seating arrangements: open and 6-seat compartments
- Catering facilities: dining car

Technical
- Track gauge: 1,435 mm (4 ft 8 1/2 in)
- Operating speed: 160 km/h

The Polonia is a EuroCity (EC) express train. It was introduced in 1997, to supplement the existing EuroCity train, the Sobieski, on the international route between Vienna, the capital of Austria, and Warsaw, the capital of Poland, via the Czech Republic.

The train's name, Polonia, is the Latin word for "Poland".

As of 2013, the northbound train, EC 102, departs from Villach Hbf, in Villach, Austria, at shortly after 09:00, and the southbound train, EC 103, departs from Warszawa Wschodnia in Warsaw at shortly after 06:00. Both trains arrive at their destinations after a journey time, via Vienna, of approximately twelve and a half hours.

== Formation (consist) ==
The train is composed of rolling stock of all three participating railways PKP, ČD and ÖBB and includes a dining car operated by PKP/WARS. Some of the coaches only operate on certain days between Villach and Břeclav or Bohumín.

The train is pulled by locomotives of the Siemens ES 64 U type: between Villach and Břeclav by an ÖBB 1116, between Břeclav and Warszawa by a PKP EU44.

== See also ==
- History of rail transport in Austria
- History of rail transport in the Czech Republic
- History of rail transport in Poland
- List of EuroCity services
- List of named passenger trains of Europe
