= List of EuroCity services =

This is a list of EuroCity (EC) and EuroCity-Express (ECE) services, past and present. EuroCity and EuroCity-Express routes are described from north-west to south-east. Unnamed services are listed alongside named services on similar routes.

== Key ==
	Former TEE service
EC	EuroCity service still active
EC	Service no longer active, but the journey can still be made on separate EuroCity trains.
	Service no longer active, but a direct train still operates the same route.
†	Service still active, but name no longer in use.

== List of services ==
Name	Route	#	Countries	Rolling stock	Period of operation	Current service
Alfred Nobel	Oslo/Stockholm – Copenhagen – Rødby – Puttgarden – Hamburg	390/391	Norway; Sweden; Denmark; Germany	DB	1987–1990	Snälltåget, SJ on Stockholm - Hamburg section
Alfred Nobel	Oslo/Stockholm – Copenhagen – Rødby – Puttgarden – Hamburg	289/290	Norway; Sweden; Denmark; Germany	DB	1990–1991	Snälltåget, SJ on Stockholm - Hamburg section
Karen Blixen	Malmö – Copenhagen – Rødby – Puttgarden – Hamburg	36/37	Sweden; Denmark; Germany	DSB	2000–2002	Snälltåget, SJ
Hamlet	Malmö – Copenhagen – Rødby – Puttgarden – Hamburg	38/39	Sweden; Denmark; Germany	DSB	2000–2002	Snälltåget, SJ
Merkur	Copenhagen – Rødby – Puttgarden – Hamburg – Bremen – Dortmund – Cologne – Koblenz – Frankfurt	30/31	Denmark; Germany	DB	1987–1991	IC
Skandinavien	Copenhagen – Rødby – Puttgarden – Hamburg	32/33	Denmark; Germany	DB	1987–1991	IC
Hansa	Copenhagen – Rødby – Puttgarden – Hamburg	34/35	Denmark; Germany	DB	1987–1991	IC
Thomas Mann	Copenhagen – Rødby – Puttgarden – Hamburg	190/191	Denmark; Germany	DB	1991–1992	IC
Thomas Mann	Copenhagen – Rødby – Puttgarden – Hamburg	182/183	Denmark; Germany	DB	1992–1998	IC
Thomas Mann	Copenhagen – Rødby – Puttgarden – Hamburg	30/33	Denmark; Germany	DSB	1998–2000	IC
Thomas Mann	Copenhagen – Rødby – Puttgarden – Hamburg	30/31	Denmark; Germany	DSB	2001–2019	IC
Karen Blixen	Copenhagen – Rødby – Puttgarden – Hamburg	192/193	Denmark; Germany	DB	1991–1992	IC
Karen Blixen	Copenhagen – Rødby – Puttgarden – Hamburg	190/191	Denmark; Germany	DB	1992–1994	IC
Karen Blixen	Copenhagen – Rødby – Puttgarden – Hamburg	186/187	Denmark; Germany	DB	1994–1998	IC
Karen Blixen	Copenhagen – Rødby – Puttgarden – Hamburg	36/37	Denmark; Germany	DSB	1998–1999; 2003–2009	IC
Hamlet	Copenhagen – Rødby – Puttgarden – Hamburg	194/195	Denmark; Germany	DB	1991–1992	IC
Hamlet	Copenhagen – Rødby – Puttgarden – Hamburg	192/193	Denmark; Germany	DB	1992–1994	IC
Hamlet	Copenhagen – Rødby – Puttgarden – Hamburg	188/189	Denmark; Germany	DSB	1994–1998	IC
Hamlet	Copenhagen – Rødby – Puttgarden – Hamburg	38/39	Denmark; Germany	DSB	1998–1999; 2003–2010	IC
Soren Kierkergaard	Copenhagen – Rødby – Puttgarden – Hamburg	184/185	Denmark; Germany	DB	1992–1994	IC
Rosenborg	Copenhagen – Rødby – Puttgarden – Hamburg	186/187	Denmark; Germany	DB	1992–1994	IC
Bertel Thorvaldsen	Copenhagen – Rødby – Puttgarden – Hamburg	188/189	Denmark; Germany	DB	1992–1994	IC
Bertel Thorvaldsen	Copenhagen – Rødby – Puttgarden – Hamburg	184/185	Denmark; Germany	DSB	1994–1998	IC
Bertel Thorvaldsen	Copenhagen – Rødby – Puttgarden – Hamburg	34/35	Denmark; Germany	DSB	1998–2008	IC
Christian Morgenstern	Copenhagen – Rødby – Puttgarden – Hamburg	180/181	Denmark; Germany	DSB	1992–1998	IC
Christian Morgenstern	Copenhagen – Rødby – Puttgarden – Hamburg	31/32	Denmark; Germany	DSB	1998–2000	IC
Christian Morgenstern	Copenhagen – Rødby – Puttgarden – Hamburg	33/34	Denmark; Germany	DSB	2001–2007	IC
Absalon	Copenhagen – Rødby – Puttgarden – Hamburg	230/231	Denmark; Germany	DSB	2001–2007	IC
	Copenhagen – Rødby – Puttgarden – Hamburg	232/233	Denmark; Germany	DSB	2003–2007	IC
	Copenhagen – Ringsted – Odense – Kolding – Padborg – Neumünster – Hamburg	390/391	Denmark; Germany	DB/DSB	2019–	EC
	Copenhagen – Ringsted – Odense – Kolding – Padborg – Neumünster – Hamburg	392/393	Denmark; Germany	DB/DSB	2019–	EC
	Copenhagen – Ringsted – Odense – Kolding – Padborg – Neumünster – Hamburg	394/395	Denmark; Germany	DB/DSB	2019–	EC
	Copenhagen – Ringsted – Odense – Kolding – Padborg – Neumünster – Hamburg	396/397	Denmark; Germany	DB/DSB	2019–	EC
	Copenhagen – Ringsted – Odense – Kolding – Padborg – Neumünster – Hamburg	398/399	Denmark; Germany	DB/DSB	2019–	EC
	Aarhus – Flensburg – Hamburg	274/275	Denmark; Germany	DSB	2003–2004	EC
	Aarhus – Flensburg – Hamburg	386/387	Denmark; Germany	DSB	2005–?	IC
Alois Negrelli	Aarhus – Flensburg – Hamburg – Berlin – Dresden – Prague	174/175	Denmark; Germany; Czech Republic	ČD	2003–2004	EC
	Aarhus – Flensburg – Hamburg – Berlin – Dresden – Prague	370/371	Denmark; Germany; Czech Republic	ČD	2005–2006	EC
	Aarhus – Flensburg – Hamburg – Berlin – Dresden – Prague – Brno – Vienna	370/371	Denmark; Germany; Czech Republic; Austria	ČD	2007	EC
Karlstein	Dortmund – Cologne – Koblenz – Frankfurt – Würzburg – Nuremberg – Prague	50/51	Germany; Czech Republic	DB	1994–2002	
Jan Hus	Dresden – Prague	168/169	Germany; Czech Republic	DB	2000	EC
Comenius	Berlin – Dresden – Prague	170/171	Germany; Czech Republic		1993–1997	EC
Carl Maria von Weber †	Berlin – Dresden – Prague	178/179	Germany; Czech Republic	ČD	1995–1997, 2008–2010, 2013–	EC
	Hamburg – Berlin – Dresden – Prague – Brno	176	Germany; Czech Republic	ČD	2008–2016	EC
Porta Bohemica	Hamburg – Berlin – Dresden – Prague	176/177	Germany; Czech Republic	ČD	1993–2007	EC
Alois Negrelli	Hamburg – Berlin – Dresden – Prague	174/175	Germany; Czech Republic	ČD	2000–2002	EC
Carl Maria von Weber †	Hamburg – Berlin – Dresden – Prague	178/179	Germany; Czech Republic	ČD	1994, 2001–2002, 2006	EC
Carl Maria von Weber †	Westerland – Hamburg – Berlin – Dresden – Prague	178/179	Germany; Czech Republic	ČD	1997–1999, 2003–2005	IC, EC
Carl Maria von Weber †	Kiel – Hamburg – Berlin – Dresden – Prague	178/179	Germany; Czech Republic	ČD	2000	EC
Carl Maria von Weber †	Szczecin – Berlin – Dresden – Prague	178/179	Poland; Germany; Czech Republic	ČD	2011–2012	RE, EC
Wawel	Hamburg – Lüneburg – Stendal – Berlin – Cottbus – Wroclaw – Kraków	240/241	Germany; Poland	DB/PKP	2007–2008	EC
Wawel	Hamburg – Lüneburg – Stendal – Berlin – Cottbus – Wroclaw – Kraków	340/341	Germany; Poland	DB/PKP	2009–2010	EC
Wawel	Hamburg – Lüneburg – Stendal – Berlin – Cottbus – Wroclaw – Kraków	248/249	Germany; Poland	DB/PKP	2011–2012	EC
Wawel	Hamburg – Lüneburg – Stendal – Berlin – Cottbus – Wroclaw	248/249	Germany; Poland	DB/PKP	2013–2014	EC
Paderewski	Berlin – Frankfurt (Oder) – Poznań – Warsaw	44/45	Germany; Poland	PKP	1998–2002	EC
Berolina	Berlin – Frankfurt (Oder) – Poznań – Warsaw	42/43	Germany; Poland	PKP	1992–1997	EC
Berolina	Berlin – Frankfurt (Oder) – Poznań – Warsaw	46/47	Germany; Poland	PKP	1997–2002	EC
Varsovia	Berlin – Frankfurt (Oder) – Poznań – Warsaw	40/41	Germany; Poland	DB	1993–2002	EC
Berlin-Warszawa-Express	Berlin – Frankfurt (Oder) – Poznań – Warsaw	40/41	Germany; Poland	DB/PKP	2002–	EC
Berlin-Warszawa-Express	Berlin – Frankfurt (Oder) – Poznań – Warsaw	42/43	Germany; Poland	DB/PKP	2011–	EC
Berlin-Warszawa-Express	Berlin – Frankfurt (Oder) – Poznań – Warsaw	44/45	Germany; Poland	DB/PKP	2002–	EC
Berlin-Warszawa-Express	Berlin – Frankfurt (Oder) – Poznań – Warsaw	46/47	Germany; Poland	DB/PKP	2002–	EC
Berlin-Warszawa-Express	Berlin – Frankfurt (Oder) – Poznań – Warsaw	48/49	Germany; Poland	DB/PKP	2011–	EC
Berlin-Warszawa-Express	Berlin – Frankfurt (Oder) – Poznań – Warsaw	246/247	Germany; Poland	DB/PKP	2019–	EC
Berlin-Warszawa-Express	Berlin – Frankfurt (Oder) – Poznań – Warsaw	248/249	Germany; Poland	DB/PKP	2019–	EC
Berlin-Warszawa-Express	Berlin – Frankfurt (Oder) – Poznań	48/49	Germany; Poland	DB/PKP	2002–2004; 2008-2010	EC
Posnania	Berlin – Frankfurt (Oder) – Poznań	48/49	Germany; Poland	PKP	1998–2002	EC
Gedania	Berlin – Frankfurt (Oder) – Poznań – Gdańsk – Gdynia	54/55	Germany; Poland	PKP	2012–	EC
Comenius	Kraków – Prague	108/109	Poland; Czech Republic		2006–2008	EC
Praha	Warsaw – Katowice – Prague	106/107	Poland; Czech Republic	PKP	1993–	EC
Polonia	Warsaw – Katowice – Vienna – Klagenfurt – Villach	102/103	Poland; Czech Republic; Austria	ÖBB/PKP	1997–?	EC,Railjet
Sobieski	Warsaw – Katowice – Vienna	104/105	Poland; Czech Republic; Austria	PKP	1994–	EC
Varsovia	Warsaw – Katowice – Břeclav – Bratislava – Budapest	130/131	Poland; Czech Republic; Slovakia; Hungary		2012–2019	EC
Jozef Bem	Warsaw – Košice – Budapest	382/383	Poland; Slovakia; Hungary			EC
	Ostseebad Binz – Stralsund – Berlin – Dresden – Prague – Bratislava	370/371	Germany; Czech Republic; Slovakia	ČD	2013–?	ICE, IC, RE
	Hamburg – Berlin – Dresden – Prague – Bratislava	177	Germany; Czech Republic; Slovakia	ČD	2013–2015	EC
Comenius	Hamburg – Berlin – Dresden – Prague – Bratislava – Budapest	174/175	Germany; Czech Republic; Slovakia; Hungary	MÁV	1997–1999	EC
Jan Jesenius	Hamburg – Berlin – Dresden – Prague – Bratislava – Budapest	174/175	Germany; Czech Republic; Slovakia; Hungary	MÁV	2005–	EC
Hungaria	Hamburg – Berlin – Dresden – Prague – Bratislava – Budapest	252/253	Germany; Czech Republic; Slovakia; Hungary	MÁV	2023–	EC
Hungaria	Hamburg – Berlin – Dresden – Prague – Bratislava – Budapest	174/175	Germany; Czech Republic; Slovakia; Hungary	MÁV	1993–1996	EC
Hungaria	Berlin – Dresden – Prague – Bratislava – Budapest	174/175	Germany; Czech Republic; Slovakia; Hungary	MÁV	1996–1997	EC
Hungaria	Berlin – Dresden – Prague – Bratislava – Budapest	170/171	Germany; Czech Republic; Slovakia; Hungary	MÁV	1997–	EC
	Ostseebad Binz – Stralsund – Berlin – Dresden – Prague – Brno – Vienna	370/371	Germany; Czech Republic; Austria	ČD	2008–2012	EC
Vindobona	Hamburg – Berlin – Dresden – Prague – Brno – Vienna	172/173	Germany; Czech Republic; Austria	DB	2001–2009	EC
Vindobona	Hamburg – Berlin – Dresden – Prague – Brno – Vienna – Klagenfurt – Villach	172/173	Germany; Czech Republic; Austria	ÖBB	2009–2014	Railjet, EC
Vindobona	Berlin – Dresden – Prague – Brno – Vienna	172/173	Germany; Czech Republic; Austria	ÖBB	1993–2000	EC, Railjet
	Berlin – Dresden – Prague – Brno – Vienna	178/179	Germany; Czech Republic; Austria	DB	2007	EC
	Berlin – Dresden – Prague – Brno – Vienna	177	Germany; Czech Republic; Austria	ČD	2008–2012	EC
Smetana	Dresden – Prague – Brno – Vienna	278/279	Germany; Czech Republic; Austria	ÖBB	2003–2004	EC
Smetana	Prague – Vienna	72/73	Czech Republic; Austria	ČD		Railjet, RegioJet
Antonín Dvořák	Prague – Vienna	8/9	Czech Republic; Austria		1992–?	EC
Antonín Dvořák	Prague – Vienna	70/71	Czech Republic; Austria	ČD	?–2010	EC
Antonín Dvořák	Prague – Vienna	76/77	Czech Republic; Austria	ČD	2010–?	Railjet, RegioJet
Gustav Mahler	Prague – Vienna	70/71	Czech Republic; Austria	ČD	2010–?	Railjet
Johann Gregor Mendel	Prague – Vienna	78/79	Czech Republic; Austria	ČD	2011–2014	Railjet
Zdeněk Fibich	Prague – Vienna	74/75	Czech Republic; Austria	ČD		EC
Gustav Klimt	Prague – Vienna – Graz	78/79	Czech Republic; Austria			Railjet
Jižní expres	Prague – České Budějovice – Linz	330/331	Czech Republic; Austria	ČD	2020–	EC
Jižní expres	Prague – České Budějovice – Linz	332/333	Czech Republic; Austria	ČD	2020–	EC
Jižní expres	Prague – České Budějovice – Linz	334/335	Czech Republic; Austria	ČD	2020–	EC
Jižní expres	Prague – České Budějovice – Linz	336/337	Czech Republic; Austria	ČD	2020–	EC
Albert Einstein	Prague – Furth im Wald – Munich – Lindau – Bregenz – Zürich – Bern – Interlaken	166/167	Czech Republic; Germany; Austria; Switzerland	SBB	1993–1999	Ex, EC, IC
Albert Einstein	Prague – Furth im Wald – Munich	166/167	Czech Republic; Germany	ČD	2000–2002	Ex
Jože Plečnik	Prague – České Budějovice – Linz – Leoben – Graz – Ljubljana	100/101	Czech Republic; Austria; Slovenia			
Košičan	Prague – Olomouc – Žilina – Košice	120/121	Czech Republic; Slovakia			RegioJet
Fatra	Prague – Ostrava – Žilina	126/127	Czech Republic; Slovakia			EC
Odra	Prague – Ostrava – Žilina	142/143	Czech Republic; Slovakia			EC
Kysuca	Prague – Ostrava – Žilina	143/230	Czech Republic; Slovakia			EC
Olše	Prague – Ostrava – Žilina	147	Czech Republic; Slovakia			EC
Jan Perner	Prague – Ostrava – Žilina	148/149	Czech Republic; Slovakia			EC
Slovenská strela	Prague – Brno – Bratislava	277/278	Czech Republic; Slovakia			EC
Detvan	Ostrava – Bratislava	220/221	Czech Republic; Slovakia	ČD	2006–?	EC
Moravia	Ostrava – Bratislava – Budapest	130/131	Czech Republic; Slovakia; Hungary			EC
Jaroslav Hasek	Prague – Brno – Bratislava – Budapest	272/273	Czech Republic; Slovakia; Hungary			EC
Slovan	Prague – Brno – Bratislava – Budapest	274/275	Czech Republic; Slovakia; Hungary			EC
Rákóczi	Košice – Miskolc – Bratislava	532/533	Slovakia; Hungary	MÁV		
Hornád	Košice – Miskolc – Bratislava	536/537	Slovakia; Hungary	MÁV		
Helvetia	Hamburg – Hanover – Kassel – Frankfurt – Mannheim – Karlsruhe – Basel – Zürich	78/79	Germany; Switzerland	DB	1987–1991	ICE
Helvetia	Hamburg – Hanover – Kassel – Frankfurt – Mannheim – Karlsruhe – Basel – Zürich	70/71	Germany; Switzerland	DB	1991–1993	ICE
Mont Blanc	Hamburg – Hanover – Kassel – Frankfurt – Mannheim – Karlsruhe – Basel – Geneva	76/77	Germany; Switzerland	DB	1987–1991	ICE, IC
Mont Blanc	Berlin – Hanover – Dortmund – Cologne – Koblenz – Mannheim – Karlsruhe – Basel – Geneva	106/107	Germany; Switzerland	DB	1991–1993	ICE, IC
Mont Blanc	Dortmund – Cologne – Koblenz – Mannheim – Karlsruhe – Basel – Zürich – Geneva	106/107	Germany; Switzerland	DB	1993–1999	ICE, IC
Mont Blanc	Bremen – Dortmund – Cologne – Koblenz – Mannheim – Karlsruhe – Basel – Zürich – Geneva	106/107	Germany; Switzerland	DB	2000	ICE, IC
Rheinpfeil	Hanover – Kassel – Frankfurt – Mannheim – Karlsruhe – Basel – Zürich – Chur	8/9	Germany; Switzerland	DB	1987–1991	ICE
Rätia †	Hamburg – Hanover – Kassel – Frankfurt – Mannheim – Karlsruhe – Basel – Zürich – Chur	70/71	Germany; Switzerland	DB	1987–1989	ICE, EC
Rätia †	Hamburg – Hanover – Kassel – Frankfurt – Mannheim – Karlsruhe – Basel – Zürich – Chur	170/171	Germany; Switzerland	DB	1989–1991	ICE, EC
Rätia †	Berlin – Hanover – Dortmund – Cologne – Koblenz – Mannheim – Karlsruhe – Basel – Zürich – Chur	102/103	Germany; Switzerland	DB	1991–1996	ICE, EC
Rätia †	Leipzig – Hanover – Dortmund – Cologne – Koblenz – Mannheim – Karlsruhe – Basel – Zürich – Chur	102/103	Germany; Switzerland	DB	1996–1998	ICE, EC
Rätia †	Hamburg – Bremen – Dortmund – Cologne – Koblenz – Mannheim – Karlsruhe – Basel – Zürich – Chur	102/103	Germany; Switzerland	DB	1998–2002	ICE, EC
Rätia †	Hamburg – Bremen – Dortmund – Cologne – Koblenz – Mannheim – Karlsruhe – Basel – Zürich – Chur	6/7	Germany; Switzerland	SBB	2003–2013	
	Hamburg – Bremen – Dortmund – Cologne – Koblenz – Mannheim – Karlsruhe – Basel – Zürich – Chur	8/9	Germany; Switzerland	SBB	2005–2006; 2013	
	Hamburg – Bremen – Dortmund – Cologne – Koblenz – Mannheim – Karlsruhe – Basel – Zürich – Chur	100/101	Germany; Switzerland	SBB	2005–2012	
Thunersee	Berlin – Hanover – Dortmund – Cologne – Koblenz – Mannheim – Karlsruhe – Basel – Bern – Interlaken	108/109	Germany; Switzerland	DB	1991–1995	ICE
Otto Lilienthal	Berlin – Braunschweig – Kassel – Frankfurt – Mannheim – Karlsruhe – Basel – Zürich	72/73	Germany; Switzerland	DB	1991–1992	ICE
Otto Lilienthal	Berlin – Braunschweig – Kassel – Frankfurt – Mannheim – Karlsruhe – Basel – Zürich	78/79	Germany; Switzerland	DB	1992–1993	ICE
Havelland	Berlin – Braunschweig – Kassel – Frankfurt – Mannheim – Karlsruhe – Basel – Zürich	74/75	Germany; Switzerland	DB	1992–1993	ICE
Lötschberg	Hanover – Dortmund – Cologne – Koblenz – Mannheim – Karlsruhe – Basel – Bern – Brig	6/7	Germany; Switzerland	DB	1987–1991	ICE, EC
Lötschberg	Berlin – Hanover – Dortmund – Cologne – Koblenz – Mannheim – Karlsruhe – Basel – Bern – Brig	100/101	Germany; Switzerland	DB	1996–1997	ICE, EC
Lötschberg	Leipzig – Hanover – Dortmund – Cologne – Koblenz – Mannheim – Karlsruhe – Basel – Bern – Brig	100/101	Germany; Switzerland	DB	1997–1998	ICE, EC
Lötschberg	Hamburg – Bremen – Dortmund – Cologne – Koblenz – Mannheim – Karlsruhe – Basel – Bern – Brig	100/101	Germany; Switzerland	DB	1998–2002	ICE, EC
Lötschberg	Hamburg – Bremen – Dortmund – Cologne – Koblenz – Mannheim – Karlsruhe – Basel – Bern – Brig	6/7	Germany; Switzerland	DB	2003–2004	ICE, EC
Komet	Hamburg – Hanover – Kassel – Frankfurt – Mannheim – Karlsruhe – Basel	470/471	Germany; Switzerland	DB	1987–1991	ICE
Matterhorn	Frankfurt – Mannheim – Karlsruhe – Basel – Bern – Brig	72/73	Germany; Switzerland	DB	1989–1991	ICE, EC
Matterhorn	Wiesbaden – Mannheim – Karlsruhe – Basel – Bern – Brig	100/101	Germany; Switzerland	SBB	1991–2002	ICE, EC
Matterhorn	Wiesbaden – Mannheim – Karlsruhe – Basel – Bern – Brig	6/7	Germany; Switzerland	SBB	2003–2004	ICE, EC
Killesberg	Stuttgart – Schaffhausen – Zürich	154/155	Germany; Switzerland	SBB	1993–1995	IC
Uetliberg	Stuttgart – Schaffhausen – Zürich	158/159	Germany; Switzerland	SBB	1993–1995	IC
Schwabenland	Stuttgart – Schaffhausen – Zürich – Chiasso	86/87	Germany; Switzerland	SBB	1987–1989	IC, EC
Carlo Magno	Dortmund – Düsseldorf – Cologne – Koblenz – Mannheim – Karlsruhe – Basel – Luzern – Chiasso – Milan – Sestri Levante	4/5	Germany; Switzerland; Italy	DB	1987–1991	
Carlo Magno	Dortmund – Düsseldorf – Cologne – Koblenz – Mannheim – Karlsruhe – Basel – Luzern – Chiasso – Milan – Sestri Levante	6/7	Germany; Switzerland; Italy	DB	1991–1992	
Verdi	Münster – Dortmund – Cologne – Koblenz – Mannheim – Karlsruhe – Basel – Luzern – Chiasso – Milan	4/5	Germany; Switzerland; Italy	DB	1991–1992	EC
Verdi	Dortmund – Cologne – Koblenz – Mannheim – Karlsruhe – Basel – Luzern – Chiasso – Milan	4/5	Germany; Switzerland; Italy	DB	1992–2002	EC
Tiziano	Dortmund – Cologne – Koblenz – Mannheim – Karlsruhe – Basel – Luzern – Chiasso – Milan	8/9	Germany; Switzerland; Italy	SBB	1991–1993	EC
Tiziano	Hamburg – Hanover – Kassel – Frankfurt – Mannheim – Karlsruhe – Basel – Luzern – Chiasso – Milan	74/75	Germany; Switzerland; Italy	DB	1987–1991	ICE, EC
Tiziano	Hanover – Dortmund – Cologne – Koblenz – Mannheim – Karlsruhe – Basel – Luzern – Chiasso – Milan	8/9	Germany; Switzerland; Italy	DB	1993–1998	ICE, EC
Tiziano	Magdeburg – Hanover – Dortmund – Cologne – Koblenz – Mannheim – Karlsruhe – Basel – Luzern – Chiasso – Milan	8/9	Germany; Switzerland; Italy	DB	1998–1999	ICE, EC
Tiziano	Hamburg – Bremen – Dortmund – Cologne – Koblenz – Mannheim – Karlsruhe – Basel – Luzern – Chiasso – Milan	8/9	Germany; Switzerland; Italy	DB	1999–2002	EC
Colosseum	Frankfurt – Mannheim – Karlsruhe – Basel – Luzern – Chiasso – Milan – Rome	70/71	Germany; Switzerland; Italy	DB	1989–1991	
Hermann Hesse	Stuttgart – Schaffhausen – Zürich – Chiasso – Milan	82/83	Germany; Switzerland; Italy	SBB	1987–1989	IC, EC
Barbarossa	Stuttgart – Schaffhausen – Zürich – Chiasso – Milan	84/85	Germany; Switzerland; Italy	SBB	1987–1988	IC, EC
	Frankfurt – Basel – Zürich – Milan	150/151	Germany; Switzerland; Italy	SBB	2017–	ECE
Karwendel	Hamburg – Hanover – Kassel – Würzburg – Munich – Garmisch-Partenkirchen – Seefeld	80/81	Germany; Austria	DB	1987–1988	ICE
Prinz Eugen	Hamburg – Hanover – Kassel – Würzburg – Nuremberg – Linz – Vienna	90/91	Germany; Austria	DB	1987–1991	ICE
Prinz Eugen	Kiel – Hamburg – Bremen – Dortmund – Cologne – Koblenz – Frankfurt – Würzburg – Nuremberg – Linz – Vienna	28/29	Germany; Austria	DB	1991–1997	ICE
Prinz Eugen	Hamburg – Bremen – Dortmund – Cologne – Koblenz – Frankfurt – Würzburg – Nuremberg – Linz – Vienna	28/29	Germany; Austria	ÖBB	1997–1999	ICE
Anton Bruckner	Hamburg – Bremen – Dortmund – Wuppertal – Cologne – Koblenz – Frankfurt – Würzburg – Nuremberg – Linz	128/129	Germany; Austria	DB	1991–1993	ICE
	Hamburg – Bremen – Dortmund – Wuppertal – Cologne – Koblenz – Frankfurt – Würzburg – Nuremberg – Linz – Vienna	22/23	Germany; Austria	DB	2006	ICE
Joseph Haydn	Hamburg – Bremen – Dortmund – Wuppertal – Cologne – Koblenz – Frankfurt – Würzburg – Nuremberg – Linz – Vienna	26/27	Germany; Austria	DB	1991–1999	ICE
Joseph Haydn	Magdeburg – Hanover – Dortmund – Düsseldorf – Cologne – Koblenz – Frankfurt – Würzburg – Nuremberg – Linz – Vienna	28/29	Germany; Austria	ÖBB	1999–2000	ICE, IC
Joseph Haydn	Dortmund – Wuppertal – Cologne – Koblenz – Frankfurt – Würzburg – Nuremberg – Linz – Vienna	28/29	Germany; Austria	ÖBB	2001–2002	ICE
	Dortmund – Wuppertal – Cologne – Koblenz – Frankfurt – Würzburg – Nuremberg – Linz – Vienna	22/23	Germany; Austria	DB	2004–2005; 2007	
Johann Strauss	Cologne – Koblenz – Frankfurt – Würzburg – Nuremberg – Linz – Vienna	28/29	Germany; Austria	ÖBB	1987–1991	ICE
Johann Strauss	Cologne – Koblenz – Frankfurt – Würzburg – Nuremberg – Linz – Vienna	22/23	Germany; Austria	ÖBB	1991–2003	ICE
Wörthersee	Münster – Dortmund – Cologne – Koblenz – Mannheim – Stuttgart – Munich – Salzburg – Villach – Klagenfurt	14/15	Germany; Austria	DB	1989–1990	EC
Wörthersee	Münster – Dortmund – Cologne – Koblenz – Mannheim – Stuttgart – Munich – Salzburg – Villach – Klagenfurt	114/115	Germany; Austria	DB	2008–	EC
Wörthersee	Dortmund – Cologne – Koblenz – Mannheim – Stuttgart – Munich – Salzburg – Villach – Klagenfurt	14/15	Germany; Austria	DB	1990–1991	EC
Wörthersee	Dortmund – Cologne – Koblenz – Mannheim – Stuttgart – Munich – Salzburg – Villach – Klagenfurt	112/113	Germany; Austria	DB	1991–1995	EC
Wörthersee	Dortmund – Cologne – Koblenz – Mannheim – Stuttgart – Munich – Salzburg – Villach – Klagenfurt	112	Germany; Austria	DB	1995–1999	EC
Wörthersee	Dortmund – Cologne – Koblenz – Mannheim – Stuttgart – Munich – Salzburg – Villach – Klagenfurt	114/115	Germany; Austria	DB	2003–2008	EC
Wörthersee	Saarbrücken – Kaiserslautern – Mannheim – Stuttgart – Munich – Salzburg – Villach – Klagenfurt	113	Germany; Austria	DB	1995–1999	EC
Wörthersee	Saarbrücken – Kaiserslautern – Mannheim – Stuttgart – Munich – Salzburg – Villach – Klagenfurt	112/113	Germany; Austria	DB	2000–2002	EC
Andreas Hofer	Dortmund – Düsseldorf – Cologne – Koblenz – Mannheim – Stuttgart – Munich – Kufstein – Innsbruck	18/19	Germany; Austria	DB	1991–2002	EC
Blauer Enzian	Dortmund – Wuppertal – Cologne – Koblenz – Frankfurt – Würzburg – Munich – Salzburg – Villach – Klagenfurt	20/21	Germany; Austria	ÖBB	1987–1989	ICE, EC
Blauer Enzian	Dortmund – Wuppertal – Cologne – Koblenz – Mannheim – Stuttgart – Munich – Salzburg – Villach – Klagenfurt	12/13	Germany; Austria	ÖBB	1989–1991	EC
Blauer Enzian	Dortmund – Wuppertal – Cologne – Koblenz – Mannheim – Stuttgart – Munich – Salzburg – Villach – Klagenfurt	114/115	Germany; Austria	ÖBB	1991–2002	EC
Blauer Enzian	Frankfurt – Stuttgart – Munich – Salzburg – Villach – Klagenfurt	112/113	Germany; Austria	ÖBB	2018–	EC
	Frankfurt – Stuttgart – Munich – Salzburg – Villach – Klagenfurt	112/113	Germany; Austria	ÖBB	2009, 2012–2017	EC
	Frankfurt – Stuttgart – Munich – Salzburg – Villach – Klagenfurt	117	Germany; Austria	DB	2009–	EC
	Frankfurt – Stuttgart – Munich – Salzburg – Leoben – Graz	318/319	Germany; Austria	DB	2009–2010	EC
	Frankfurt – Stuttgart – Munich – Salzburg – Leoben – Graz	218/219	Germany; Austria	DB	2011–	EC
	Frankfurt – Stuttgart – Munich – Salzburg – Linz	390/391	Germany; Austria	DB	2009–	EC
Johannes Kepler	Frankfurt – Würzburg – Nuremberg – Linz	120/121	Germany; Austria	ÖBB	1991–1994	ICE
Patscherkofel	Saarbrücken – Kaiserslautern – Mannheim – Stuttgart – Munich – Kufstein – Innsbruck	14/15	Germany; Austria	DB	1993–1995	EC
Dachstein	Saarbrücken – Kaiserslautern – Mannheim – Stuttgart – Munich – Salzburg – Leoben – Graz	316/317	Germany; Austria	DB	2009–2010	EC
Dachstein	Saarbrücken – Kaiserslautern – Mannheim – Stuttgart – Munich – Salzburg – Leoben – Graz	216/217	Germany; Austria	DB	2011–	EC
	Siegen – Frankfurt – Stuttgart – Munich – Salzburg – Villach – Klagenfurt	112/113	Germany; Austria	ÖBB	2010–2011	RE, EC
Hugo von Hofmannsthal	Stuttgart – Munich – Salzburg – Villach – Klagenfurt	110/111	Germany; Austria	DB	1991–1993	EC
Hugo von Hofmannsthal	Munich – Salzburg – Linz – Vienna	190/191	Germany; Austria	ÖBB	1997–1998	Railjet
Stachus	Munich – Salzburg – Linz – Vienna	66/67	Germany; Austria	ÖBB	1987–1989	Railjet
Stachus	Munich – Salzburg – Linz – Vienna	18/19	Germany; Austria	ÖBB	1989–1991	Railjet
Stachus	Munich – Salzburg – Linz – Vienna	166/167	Germany; Austria	ÖBB	1991–1993	Railjet
Rosenkavalier	Munich – Salzburg – Linz – Vienna	60/61	Germany; Austria	ÖBB	1991–1993	Railjet
Max Reinhardt	Munich – Salzburg – Linz – Vienna	16/17	Germany; Austria	ÖBB	1993–2000	Railjet
	Munich – Salzburg – Linz – Vienna	116/117	Germany; Austria	ÖBB	2003–2006	Railjet
	Munich – Salzburg – Villach – Klagenfurt	110/111	Germany; Austria	ÖBB	2003–2006, 2009–	EC
Mimara	Munich – Salzburg – Villach – Klagenfurt	112/113	Germany; Austria	ÖBB	2003–2008	EC
Robert Stolz	Munich – Salzburg – Leoben – Graz	16/17	Germany; Austria	ÖBB	1989–1991	EC
DB-ÖBB Eurocity	Munich – Kufstein – Innsbruck	80/189	Germany; Austria	DB	2009	EC
DB-ÖBB Eurocity	Munich – Kufstein – Innsbruck	188/189	Germany; Austria	DB	2010	EC
DB-ÖBB Eurocity	Munich – Kufstein – Innsbruck	82/189	Germany; Austria	ÖBB	2012–	EC
Leonardo da Vinci	Dortmund – Cologne – Koblenz – Mannheim – Stuttgart – Munich – Kufstein – Innsbruck – Verona – Milan	10/11	Germany; Austria; Italy	DB	1987–1991	
Leonardo da Vinci	Dortmund – Cologne – Koblenz – Mannheim – Stuttgart – Munich – Kufstein – Innsbruck – Verona – Milan	12/13	Germany; Austria; Italy	DB	1995–2000	
Paganini	Dortmund – Cologne – Koblenz – Mannheim – Stuttgart – Munich – Kufstein – Innsbruck – Verona – Bologna	12/13	Germany; Austria; Italy	DB	1991–1993	EC
Paganini	Dortmund – Cologne – Koblenz – Mannheim – Stuttgart – Munich – Kufstein – Innsbruck – Verona – Venice	12/13	Germany; Austria; Italy	DB	1993–1995	EC
Paganini	Dortmund – Cologne – Koblenz – Mannheim – Stuttgart – Munich – Kufstein – Innsbruck – Verona	12/13	Germany; Austria; Italy	DB	2000–2002	EC
DB-ÖBB Eurocity	Munich – Kufstein – Innsbruck – Bolzano	80/81	Germany; Austria; Italy	DB	2010	EC
DB-ÖBB Eurocity	Munich – Kufstein – Innsbruck – Bolzano	82/189	Germany; Austria; Italy	ÖBB	2011	EC
Val Gardena	Munich – Kufstein – Innsbruck – Bolzano	188/189	Germany; Austria; Italy	ÖBB	2005–2006	EC
Val Gardena	Munich – Kufstein – Innsbruck – Bolzano	81/82	Germany; Austria; Italy	ÖBB	2009	EC
DB-ÖBB Eurocity	Munich – Kufstein – Innsbruck – Bolzano – Verona	82/83	Germany; Austria; Italy	DB	2010	EC
DB-ÖBB Eurocity	Munich – Kufstein – Innsbruck – Bolzano – Verona	80/81	Germany; Austria; Italy	ÖBB	2011–	EC
DB-ÖBB Eurocity	Munich – Kufstein – Innsbruck – Bolzano – Verona	83/188	Germany; Austria; Italy	ÖBB	2011–	EC
DB-ÖBB Eurocity	Munich – Kufstein – Innsbruck – Bolzano – Verona	88/89	Germany; Austria; Italy	ÖBB	2013–	EC
Val Gardena	Munich – Kufstein – Innsbruck – Bolzano – Verona	188/189	Germany; Austria; Italy	ÖBB	2007–2008	EC
DB-ÖBB Eurocity	Munich – Kufstein – Innsbruck – Verona – Bologna ( – Rimini)	84/85	Germany; Austria; Italy	ÖBB	2010–	EC
DB-ÖBB Eurocity	Munich – Kufstein – Innsbruck – Verona – Venice	86/87	Germany; Austria; Italy	ÖBB	2011–	EC
Tiepolo	Munich – Kufstein – Innsbruck – Verona – Venice	86/87	Germany; Austria; Italy	FS	1995–2009	EC
Leonardo da Vinci	Munich – Kufstein – Innsbruck – Verona – Milan	86/87	Germany; Austria; Italy	FS	1991–1995	
Leonardo da Vinci	Munich – Kufstein – Innsbruck – Verona – Milan	88/89	Germany; Austria; Italy	FS	2000–2011	
Garda	Munich – Kufstein – Innsbruck – Verona – Milan	80/81	Germany; Austria; Italy	FS	1991–2008	
Garda	Munich – Kufstein – Innsbruck – Verona	83/188	Germany; Austria; Italy	FS	2009	EC
Paganini	Munich – Kufstein – Innsbruck – Verona	86/87	Germany; Austria; Italy	FS	1995–2000	EC
Paganini	Munich – Kufstein – Innsbruck – Verona	82/83	Germany; Austria; Italy	FS	2003–2008	EC
Michaelangelo	Munich – Kufstein – Innsbruck – Verona – Milan – Roma	80/81	Germany; Austria; Italy	FS	1989–1991	
Michaelangelo	Munich – Kufstein – Innsbruck – Verona – Milan – Roma	84/85	Germany; Austria; Italy	FS	1991–2009	
Schweizerland	Munich – Lindau – Bregenz – Zürich – Bern	92/93	Germany; Austria; Switzerland	DB	1991–1994	EC, IC
Gottfried Keller	Munich – Lindau – Bregenz – Zürich – Bern	96/97	Germany; Austria; Switzerland	SBB	1991–1993	EC
Schweizerland	Munich – Lindau – Bregenz – Zürich	92/93	Germany; Austria; Switzerland	SBB	1987–1991	EC
Gottfried Keller	Munich – Lindau – Bregenz – Zürich	96/97	Germany; Austria; Switzerland	SBB	1987–1991	EC
Gottfried Keller	Munich – Lindau – Bregenz – Zürich	94/95	Germany; Austria; Switzerland	SBB	1993–2002	EC
Angelika Kauffmann	Munich – Lindau – Bregenz – Zürich	92/93	Germany; Austria; Switzerland	SBB	1993–2002	EC
Bavaria	Munich – Lindau – Bregenz – Zürich	98/99	Germany; Austria; Switzerland	SBB	1987–2002	EC
Albert Einstein	Munich – Lindau – Bregenz – Zürich	196/197	Germany; Austria; Switzerland	SBB	2000–2002	EC
	Munich – Lindau – Bregenz – Zürich	190/191	Germany; Austria; Switzerland	SBB	2003–2020	EC
	Munich – Lindau – Bregenz – Zürich	192/193	Germany; Austria; Switzerland	SBB	2003–2020	EC
	Munich – Lindau – Bregenz – Zürich	194/195	Germany; Austria; Switzerland	SBB	2003–2020	EC
	Munich – Lindau – Bregenz – Zürich	196/197	Germany; Austria; Switzerland	SBB	2003–2020	EC
	Munich – Lindau – Bregenz – Zürich	198/199	Germany; Austria; Switzerland	SBB	2003–2020	EC
	Munich – Lindau-Reutin – Bregenz – Zürich	96/97	Germany; Austria; Switzerland	SBB	2020–	ECE
	Munich – Lindau-Reutin – Bregenz – Zürich	98/99	Germany; Austria; Switzerland	SBB	2020–	ECE
	Munich – Lindau-Reutin – Bregenz – Zürich	190/191	Germany; Austria; Switzerland	SBB	2020–	ECE
	Munich – Lindau-Reutin – Bregenz – Zürich	192/193	Germany; Austria; Switzerland	SBB	2020–	ECE
	Munich – Lindau-Reutin – Bregenz – Zürich	194/195	Germany; Austria; Switzerland	SBB	2020–	ECE
	Munich – Lindau-Reutin – Bregenz – Zürich	196/197	Germany; Austria; Switzerland	SBB	2020–	ECE
	Munich – Lindau-Reutin – Bregenz – Zürich	198/199	Germany; Austria; Switzerland	SBB	2020–	ECE
Fransz Liszt	Dortmund – Düsseldorf – Cologne – Koblenz – Frankfurt – Würzburg – Nuremberg – Linz – Vienna – Budapest	20/21	Germany; Austria; Hungary	DB	1989–1991	ICE, Railjet/EC
Fransz Liszt	Dortmund – Düsseldorf – Cologne – Koblenz – Frankfurt – Würzburg – Nuremberg – Linz – Vienna – Budapest	24/25	Germany; Austria; Hungary	DB	1991–2002	ICE, Railjet/EC
Fransz Liszt	Dortmund – Düsseldorf – Cologne – Koblenz – Frankfurt – Würzburg – Nuremberg – Linz – Vienna – Budapest	24/25	Germany; Austria; Hungary	ÖBB	2003–2007	ICE, Railjet/EC
Bela Bartok	Munich – Salzburg – Linz – Vienna – Budapest	62/63	Germany; Austria; Hungary	MÁV	1991–2008	Railjet,EN
	Munich – Salzburg – Villach – Ljubljana – Zagreb – Belgrade	210/211	Germany; Austria; Slovenia; Croatia; Serbia			
Mimara	Munich – Salzburg – Villach – Ljubljana – Zagreb	10/11	Germany; Austria; Slovenia; Croatia	HŽ	1991–1993	EC
Mimara	Munich – Salzburg – Villach – Ljubljana – Zagreb	192/193	Germany; Austria; Slovenia; Croatia	HŽ	2000–2002	EC
Mimara	Munich – Salzburg – Villach – Ljubljana – Zagreb	112/113	Germany; Austria; Slovenia; Croatia	ÖBB	2003–2008	EC
Mimara	Leipzig – Nuremberg – Munich – Salzburg – Villach – Ljubljana – Zagreb	10/11	Germany; Austria; Slovenia; Croatia	HŽ	1993–1995	ICE, EC
Mimara	Berlin – Leipzig – Nuremberg – Munich – Salzburg – Villach – Ljubljana – Zagreb	10/11	Germany; Austria; Slovenia; Croatia	HŽ	1995–2000	ICE, EC
Mimara	Villach – Ljubljana – Zagreb	212/213	Austria; Slovenia; Croatia			EC
Agram	Salzburg – Villach – Ljubljana – Zagreb	314/315	Austria; Slovenia; Croatia	SŽ	2002–?	EC
Croatia	Vienna – Graz – Zagreb	156/157	Austria; Slovenia; Croatia			EC
Zagreb	Vienna – Graz – Zagreb	158/159	Austria; Slovenia; Croatia			EC
Emona	Vienna – Graz – Ljubljana – Trieste	150/151	Austria; Slovenia; Italy	ÖBB	2011–	EC
	Vienna – Graz – Maribor	253/256	Austria; Slovenia	ÖBB		
Benjamin Britten	Amsterdam – Rotterdam – Hoek van Holland Haven (Hook of Holland Harbour) – Harwich – London	62/63	Netherlands; United Kingdom	NS/BR	1987–1988	Dutchflyer
Admiraal de Ruijter	Amsterdam – Rotterdam – Hoek van Holland Haven (Hook of Holland Harbour) – Harwich – London	66/67	Netherlands; United Kingdom	NS/BR	1987–1988	Dutchflyer
Étoile du Nord	Amsterdam – Rotterdam – Antwerpen – Brussels – Paris	82/87	Netherlands; Belgium; France	SNCF	1987–1995	Eurostar
Erasmus	Amsterdam – Utrecht – Oberhausen – Düsseldorf – Cologne – Koblenz – Frankfurt – Würzburg – Nuremberg – Munich – Kufstein – Innsbruck	24/25	Netherlands; Germany; Austria	DB	1987–1991	NJ
Erasmus	Amsterdam – Utrecht – Oberhausen – Düsseldorf – Cologne	143/150	Netherlands; Germany	DB	1991–2000	ICE
Hieronymus Bosch	Amsterdam – Utrecht – Oberhausen – Düsseldorf – Cologne	140/153	Netherlands; Germany	DB	1991–2000	ICE
Bonifacius	Amsterdam – Utrecht – Oberhausen – Düsseldorf – Cologne	141/152	Netherlands; Germany	DB	1991–2000	ICE
Jan Pietersz Sweelinck	Amsterdam – Utrecht – Oberhausen – Düsseldorf – Cologne	142/151	Netherlands; Germany	DB	1991–2000	ICE
Johannes Vermeer	Amsterdam – Utrecht – Oberhausen – Düsseldorf – Cologne	144/149	Netherlands; Germany	DB	1991–2000	ICE
Piet Mondriaan	Amsterdam – Utrecht – Oberhausen – Düsseldorf – Cologne	146/147	Netherlands; Germany	DB	1991–2000	ICE
Frans Hals	Amsterdam – Utrecht – Oberhausen – Düsseldorf – Cologne	145/148	Netherlands; Germany	DB	1991–2000	ICE
Frans Hals	Amsterdam – Utrecht – Oberhausen – Düsseldorf – Cologne – Koblenz – Mannheim – Stuttgart – Munich – Kufstein – Innsbruck	26/27	Netherlands; Germany; Austria	DB	1987–1991	NJ
Rembrandt	Amsterdam – Utrecht – Oberhausen – Düsseldorf – Cologne – Koblenz – Mannheim – Karlsruhe – Basel – Zürich – Chur	2/3	Netherlands; Germany; Switzerland	SBB	1987–2002	
Berner Oberland	Amsterdam – Utrecht – Oberhausen – Düsseldorf – Cologne – Koblenz – Mannheim – Karlsruhe – Basel – Bern – Interlaken	100/101	Netherlands; Germany; Switzerland	SBB	1991–2002	ICE
Berner Oberland	Amsterdam – Utrecht – Oberhausen – Düsseldorf – Cologne – Koblenz – Mannheim – Karlsruhe – Basel – Bern – Interlaken	2/3	Netherlands; Germany; Switzerland	SBB	2003	ICE
Berner Oberland	Hamburg – Bremen – Dortmund – Düsseldorf – Cologne – Koblenz – Mannheim – Karlsruhe – Basel – Bern – Interlaken	100/101	Netherlands; Germany; Switzerland	SBB	2004	EC
Île de France	Brussels – Paris	80/85	Belgium; France	SNCB/SNCF	1987–1993	Eurostar
Rubens	Brussels – Paris	81/84	Belgium; France	SNCB/SNCF	1987–1993	Eurostar
Brabant	Brussels – Paris	83/86	Belgium; France	SNCF	1987–1993	Eurostar
Alexander von Humboldt	Berlin – Hanover – Dortmund – Düsseldorf – Cologne – Aachen – Liège – Brussels	46/47	Germany; Belgium	DB	1993–1997	European Sleeper
Alexander von Humboldt	Cologne – Aachen – Liège – Brussels	46/47	Germany; Belgium	DB	1997–1998	ICE/Eurostar
Felix Timmermans	Cologne – Aachen – Liège – Brussels	36/37	Germany; Belgium	DB	1993–1997	ICE/Eurostar
Memling	Cologne – Aachen – Liège – Brussels – Bruges – Oostende	48/49	Germany; Belgium	SNCB	1987–1988	ICE, IC
Memling	Cologne – Aachen – Liège – Brussels – Bruges – Oostende	48/49	Germany; Belgium	SNCB	1991–1993	ICE, IC
Memling	Frankfurt – Koblenz – Cologne – Aachen – Liège – Brussels – Bruges – Oostende	22/23	Germany; Belgium	SNCB	1988–1991	ICE, IC
Memling	Dortmund – Cologne – Aachen – Liège – Brussels – Bruges – Oostende	48/49	Germany; Belgium	SNCB	1993–1995	ICE, IC
Memling	Dortmund – Cologne – Aachen – Liège – Brussels – Bruges – Oostende	34/35	Germany; Belgium	SNCB	1995–1998	ICE, IC
Molière	Dortmund – Cologne – Aachen – Liège – Paris	40/41	Germany; Belgium; France	DB	1987–1993	Eurostar
Molière	Dortmund – Cologne – Aachen – Liège – Paris	30/31	Germany; Belgium; France	SNCF	1993–1997	Eurostar
Parsifal	Cologne – Aachen – Liège – Paris	44/45	Germany; Belgium; France	SNCF	1987–1993	Eurostar
Parsifal	Cologne – Aachen – Liège – Paris	32/33	Germany; Belgium; France	SNCF	1993–1997	Eurostar
Gustave Eiffel	Cologne – Aachen – Liège – Paris	42/43	Germany; Belgium; France	DB	1987–1988	Eurostar
Gustave Eiffel	Paris – Metz – Saarbrücken – Kaiserslautern – Mannheim – Frankfurt	54/55	France; Germany	SNCF	1988–2007	ICE/TGV
Victor Hugo	Paris – Metz – Saarbrücken – Kaiserslautern – Mannheim – Frankfurt	52/53	France; Germany	DB	1987–1995	ICE/TGV
Goethe	Paris – Metz – Saarbrücken – Kaiserslautern – Mannheim – Frankfurt	56/57	France; Germany	DB	1987–1991; 2000–2007	ICE/TGV
Goethe	Paris – Metz – Saarbrücken – Kaiserslautern – Mannheim – Frankfurt	58/59	France; Germany	SNCF	1991–1993	ICE/TGV
Heinrich Heine	Paris – Metz – Saarbrücken – Kaiserslautern – Mannheim – Frankfurt	58/59	France; Germany	SNCF	1989–1991	ICE/TGV
Heinrich Heine	Paris – Metz – Saarbrücken – Kaiserslautern – Mannheim – Frankfurt	56/57	France; Germany	SNCF	1991–1993	ICE/TGV
Heinrich Heine	Paris – Metz – Saarbrücken – Kaiserslautern – Mannheim – Frankfurt – Erfurt – Leipzig – Dresden	56/57	France; Germany	DB	1993–1995	ICE
Maurice Ravel	Paris – Strasbourg – Karlsruhe – Stuttgart – Munich	66/67	France; Germany	DB	1989–2007	ICE/TGV
	Paris – Strasbourg – Karlsruhe – Stuttgart – Munich	64/65	France; Germany	DB	2003–2007	ICE/TGV
Marie Curie	Paris – Strasbourg – Karlsruhe – Stuttgart	68/69	France; Germany	DB	1992–1996	ICE/TGV
Marie Curie	Strasbourg – Karlsruhe – Stuttgart	166/167	France; Germany	DB	2005	ICE/TGV
Marie Curie	Strasbourg – Karlsruhe – Stuttgart	168/169	France; Germany	DB	2005	ICE/TGV
	Strasbourg – Karlsruhe – Stuttgart – Munich	60/61	France; Germany	DB	2003–2008	ICE/TGV
	Strasbourg – Karlsruhe – Stuttgart – Munich	264/265	France; Germany	DB	2003–2006	ICE/TGV
	Strasbourg – Karlsruhe – Stuttgart – Munich	266/267	France; Germany	DB	2003–2007	ICE/TGV
	Strasbourg – Karlsruhe – Stuttgart – Munich	360/361	France; Germany	DB	2009–2010	ICE/TGV
Goethe	Paris – Metz – Saarbrücken – Kaiserslautern – Mannheim – Frankfurt – Erfurt – Leipzig – Dresden – Prague	56/57	France; Germany; Czech Republic	DB	1997–1999	ICE, EC
Heinrich Heine	Paris – Metz – Saarbrücken – Kaiserslautern – Mannheim – Frankfurt – Erfurt – Leipzig – Dresden – Prague	56/57	France; Germany; Czech Republic	DB	1995–1997	ICE, EC
Mozart	Paris – Strasbourg – Karlsruhe – Stuttgart – Munich – Salzburg – Linz – Vienna	68/69	France; Germany; Austria	ÖBB	1989–1991	NJ
Mozart	Paris – Strasbourg – Karlsruhe – Stuttgart – Munich – Salzburg – Linz – Vienna	64/65	France; Germany; Austria	ÖBB	1991–2002	NJ
Mozart	Munich – Salzburg – Linz – Vienna	68/69	Germany; Austria	ÖBB	2003–2008	Railjet
Jean Monnet	Brussels – Luxembourg – Metz – Strasbourg – Basel	295/296	Belgium; Luxembourg; France; Switzerland	SNCB/SBB	1988–2007	
Vauban	Brussels – Luxembourg – Metz – Strasbourg – Basel – Milan	90/91	Belgium; Luxembourg; France; Switzerland; Italy	SBB	1988–2007	
Vauban	Brussels – Luxembourg – Metz – Strasbourg – Basel – Bern – Interlaken	90/91	Belgium; Luxembourg; France; Switzerland	SBB	2007	
Vauban	Brussels – Luxembourg – Metz – Strasbourg – Basel – Zürich	90/91	Belgium; Luxembourg; France; Switzerland	SBB	2007–2016	
Iris	Brussels – Luxembourg – Metz – Strasbourg – Basel – Zürich – Chur	96/97	Belgium; Luxembourg; France; Switzerland	SBB	1987–2016	
Robert Schuman	Paris – Luxembourg	203/209	France; Luxembourg	CFL	1987–?	TGV
Champs Elysees	Paris – Lausanne	22/29	France; Switzerland	SNCF	1987–?	TGV Lyria
Le Corbusier	Paris – Basel	113/116	France; Switzerland	SNCF	1987–?	TGV Lyria
Arbalète	Paris – Basel – Zürich	114/115	France; Switzerland	SNCF	1987–1997	TGV Lyria
Le Genevois	Paris – Geneva	971/980	France; Switzerland	SNCF	1987–?	TGV Lyria
J.J. Rousseau	Paris – Geneva	972/979	France; Switzerland	SNCF	1987–?	TGV Lyria
Henri Dunant	Paris – Geneva	974/977	France; Switzerland	SNCF	1987–?	TGV Lyria
Voltaire	Paris – Geneva	973/976	France; Switzerland	SNCF (TGV)	1987–?	TGV Lyria
Versailles	Paris – Geneva	975/978	France; Switzerland	SNCF (TGV)	1987–?	TGV Lyria
Lutetia	Paris – Geneva – Lausanne – Brig – Milan	21/24	France; Switzerland; Italy	SNCF	1987–1993	TGV, EC
Cisalpin	Paris – Geneva – Lausanne – Brig – Milan	23/26	France; Switzerland; Italy	SNCF	1987–?	TGV, EC
Vallese	Paris – Geneva – Lausanne – Brig – Milan	120/127	France; Switzerland; Italy	SNCF		TGV, EC
Borromeo	Paris – Geneva – Lausanne – Brig – Milan	123/124	France; Switzerland; Italy	SNCF		TGV, EC
Monte Rosa	Paris – Geneva – Lausanne – Brig – Milan	124/129	France; Switzerland; Italy	CIS	2004–?	TGV, EC
Galilei	Paris – Geneva – Lausanne – Brig – Milan – Venice / Florence	21/24	France; Switzerland; Italy	SNCF	1987–1993	
Barcelona Talgo	Paris – Toulouse – Barcelona	475/477	France; Spain	Renfe	1987–1993	
Madrid Talgo	Paris – Bordeaux – Madrid	407/409	France; Spain	Renfe	1987–1993	
Catalan Talgo	Geneva – Grenoble – Avignon – Nimes – Perpignan – Barcelona	70/71	Switzerland; France; Spain	Renfe	1987–2010	
Caravaggio	Paris – Turin – Milan	9240/9249	France; Italy	SNCF (TGV)	2003–?	TGV/Frecciarossa
Alexandre Dumas	Paris – Turin – Milan	9242/9247	France; Italy	SNCF (TGV)	1996–2009	TGV/Frecciarossa
Stendhal	Paris – Turin – Milan	220/221	France; Italy	SNCF	1994–?	TGV/Frecciarossa
Palatino	Paris – Genoa – Rome	212/213	France; Italy	SNCF	1987–2003	
Mont Cenis	Lyon – Turin	136/139	France; Italy	FS	1996–2003	Frecciarossa
Monginevro	Lyon – Turin	140/143	France; Italy	FS	1996–2003	Frecciarossa
Frejus	Lyon – Turin	144/145	France; Italy	FS	1996–2003	Frecciarossa
Frejus	Lyon – Turin	146/147	France; Italy	FS	1996–2003	Frecciarossa
Albert Schweitzer	Lyon – Strasbourg – Karlsruhe – Mannheim – Frankfurt	277/278	France; Germany	DB	2001–2002	TGV
	Lyon – Strasbourg – Karlsruhe – Stuttgart	166/169	France; Germany	DB	2004	TGV
Transalpin	Basel – Zürich – Innsbruck – Salzburg – Linz – Vienna	162/163	Switzerland; Austria	ÖBB/SBB	1987–2010	EC, Railjet
Transalpin	Zürich – Innsbruck – Leoben – Graz	162/163	Switzerland; Austria	ÖBB/SBB	2013–	EC
Maria Theresia	Zürich – Innsbruck – Salzburg – Linz – Vienna	160/161	Switzerland; Austria	ÖBB	1987–2010	Railjet
Franz Schubert	Zürich – Innsbruck – Salzburg – Linz – Vienna	165/151	Switzerland; Austria	ÖBB	1987–2010	Railjet
	Geneva – Lausanne – Brig – Milan	32/39	Switzerland; Italy	SBB		EC
	Geneva – Lausanne – Brig – Milan	34/35	Switzerland; Italy	SBB		EC
	Geneva – Lausanne – Brig – Milan	36/41	Switzerland; Italy	SBB		EC
Monteverdi	Geneva – Lausanne – Brig – Milan – Venice	37/42	Switzerland; Italy	SBB		EC
	Geneva – Lausanne – Brig – Milan – Venice	39/40	Switzerland; Italy	SBB		EC
Gottardo	Zürich – Chiasso – Milan	57/58	Switzerland; Italy	SBB	1988–1994	EC
	Zürich – Chiasso – Milan	12/13	Switzerland; Italy	SBB	2009–	EC
	Zürich – Chiasso – Milan	14/15	Switzerland; Italy	SBB	2009–	EC
	Zürich – Chiasso – Milan	16/17	Switzerland; Italy	SBB	2009–	EC
	Zürich – Chiasso – Milan	18/19	Switzerland; Italy	SBB	2009–2011	EC
	Zürich – Chiasso – Milan	20/21	Switzerland; Italy	SBB	2009–	EC
	Zürich – Chiasso – Milan	22/23	Switzerland; Italy	SBB	2009–	EC
	Zürich – Chiasso – Milan	24/25	Switzerland; Italy	SBB	2009–	EC
	Zürich – Chiasso – Milan	113/114	Switzerland; Italy	SBB	2009–	EC
Cisalpino Teodolina	Zürich – Chiasso – Milan	171/178	Switzerland; Italy	CIS		EC
Insubria	Zürich – Chiasso – Milan	179	Switzerland; Italy	CIS		EC
Manzoni	Winterthur – Zürich – Chiasso – Milan	50/51	Switzerland; Italy	SBB	1989–1993	EC
Rossini	Schaffhausen – Zürich – Chiasso – Milan	53/56	Switzerland; Italy		1987–?	IC, EC
Canaletto	Schaffhausen – Zürich – Chiasso – Milan – Venice	382/283	Switzerland; Italy	CIS	2004–?	IC, EC
Cinque Terre	Schaffhausen – Zürich – Chiasso – Milan – Genoa – Livorno	354/355	Switzerland; Italy	CIS	2004–2008	
Lario	Biasca – Chiasso – Milan	105	Switzerland; Italy			IR
Brianza	Bellinzona – Chiasso – Milan	197/198	Switzerland; Italy	CIS		EC, IC
	Luzern – Chiasso – Milan	153/158	Switzerland; Italy	SBB	2011–	EC
Ticino	Basel – Luzern – Chiasso – Milan	109/110	Switzerland; Italy	CIS	1993–2008	EC
Mediolanum	Basel – Luzern – Chiasso – Milan	115/116	Switzerland; Italy	CIS	2004–?	EC
San Marco	Basel – Luzern – Chiasso – Milan – Verona – Vicenza – Venice	111/114	Switzerland; Italy	CIS	2005–?	EC
Verbano	Basel – Bern – Brig – Milan	130/131	Switzerland; Italy			EC
	Basel – Bern – Brig – Milan	50/51	Switzerland; Italy	SBB	2008–	EC
	Basel – Bern – Brig – Milan	52/59	Switzerland; Italy	SBB	2009–	EC
	Basel – Bern – Brig – Milan	56/57	Switzerland; Italy	SBB	2009–	EC
Romulus	Vienna – Klagenfurt – Venice – Florence – Rome	30/37	Austria; Italy		1987–2001	EN
Stradivari	Vienna – Klagenfurt – Venice	32/33	Austria; Italy		2004–?	Railjet
Lehár	Vienna – Budapest	40/41	Austria; Hungary	MÁV	1988–2008	Railjet, EC
Csárdás	Vienna – Budapest	964/965	Austria; Hungary			Railjet, EC
Semmelweis Ignác	Vienna – Budapest	962/967	Austria; Hungary			Railjet, EC
Hortobágy	Wien-Hauptbahnhof – Hegyeshalom – Győr – Budapest-Keleti – Szolnok – Hajdúszoboszló– Debrecen – Nyíregyháza	140/147	Austria; Hungary	MÁV	2016–	EC
Beograd	Vienna – Budapest – Novi Sad – Belgrade	340/341; 342/343	Austria; Hungary; Serbia			
Casanova	Venice – Ljubljana	50/51	Italy; Slovenia	SŽ	2003–2008	
Drava	Venice – Ljubljana – Zagreb – Budapest	52/53	Italy; Slovenia; Croatia; Hungary	SŽ		
Citadella	Ljubljana – Budapest	246/247	Slovenia; Hungary	MÁV		EC
Citadella	Ljubljana – Budapest	246/247	Slovenia; Hungary	SŽ		EC
Riviera del Fiori	Nice – Monte Carlo – Genoa – Milan	139/140	France; Monaco; Italy	FS	2004–2009	
Riviera del Fiori	Nice – Monte Carlo – Genoa – Milan	159/160	France; Monaco; Italy	FS	2004–2009	
Ligure	Nice – Monte Carlo – Genoa – Milan	141/142	France; Monaco; Italy	FS	2004–2009	
Ligure	Nice – Monte Carlo – Genoa – Milan	147/148	France; Monaco; Italy	FS	2004–2009	
Sanremo	Nice – Monte Carlo – Genoa – Milan	143/146	France; Monaco; Italy	FS	2004–2009	
Traianus	Budapest – Bucharest	46/47	Hungary; Romania		1997–2002	IR, IC
Avala	Budapest – Kelebia – Belgrade	344/345	Hungary; Serbia			
Avala	Belgrade – Niš – Sofia	293/294	Serbia; Bulgaria			
