= Heinrich Heine (train) =

Overview
- Service type: Trans Europ Express (TEE) (1979–1983); InterCity (IC) (1985–1989); EuroCity (EC) (1989–2003)
- Locale: Germany; France
- First service: 28 May 1979
- Last service: 14 December 2003
- Former operator(s): Deutsche Bundesbahn / Deutsche Bahn

Technical
- Track gauge: 1,435 mm (4 ft 8 1/2 in)
- Electrification: 25 kV 50 Hz (France); 15 kV 16.7 Hz (Germany)

The Heinrich Heine was an express train operated by Deutsche Bundesbahn, initially linking Frankfurt am Main and Dortmund. The train was named after the German poet and journalist Heinrich Heine.

== History ==
=== Trans Europ Express ===
The Heinrich Heine was part of the IC79 scheme introduced on 28 May 1979. It was the "mirror" of the Goethe on the West Rhine Railway. Early in the morning Heinrich Heine left Frankfurt for a northbound trip and Goethe left Dortmund southbound. In the evening both trains ran in the opposite directions. This concept of a pair of trains running at the same time on the same route in opposite directions was later applied as principle of the EuroCity network's schedule.

TEE 29	country	station	km	TEE 28
19:23	Germany	Dortmund	0	10:21
19:44	Germany	Essen	34	10:00
19:55	Germany	Duisburg	54	09:49
20:09	Germany	Düsseldorf	77	09:36
20:36	Germany	Cologne	117	09:09
20:56	Germany	Bonn	151	08:45
21:31	Germany	Koblenz	210	08:13
22:22	Germany	Mainz	302	07:21
22:46	Germany	Frankfurt am Main	340	06:56

Part of the IC79 scheme was running on weekdays only. After one year of service the Heinrich Heine was suspended during the summer, so in 1980, 1981 and 1982 the train did not ride during June, July and August. From 26 September 1982 the service was reduced to once a week, northbound on Mondays and southbound on Fridays, because Lufthansa introduced their Lufthansa Airport Express serving the same customers on the same route. Eventually the TEE adventure for the Heinrich Heine ended at 27 May 1983.

=== InterCity ===
The Heinrich Heine was revived as InterCity on 2 June 1985 between Hamburg and Frankfurt am Main.

=== EuroCity ===
In order to raise the frequency of EuroCitys between Paris and Frankfurt am Main the Heinrich Heine was commissioned to that route together with the EC Gustave Eiffel, doubling the number of EuroCitys on this route. The schedule of the EC Heinrich Heine was designed to leave Paris in the morning, attend a meeting in Frankfurt and return to Paris having dinner on board.

EC 54	country	station	km	EC 55
16:49	Germany	Frankfurt am Main	0	13:13
	Germany	Mannheim	81	
	Germany	Kaiserslautern	142	
	Germany	Saarbrücken	209	
	France	Forbach Lorraine	219	
	France	Metz	289	
23:11	France	Paris Est	643	06:58

After German reunification the Heinrich Heine was prolonged farther east to Dresden on 2 June 1991. On 28 June 1995 the eastern terminus shifted even to Prague but on 27 May 1997 it was shortened to the original EuroCity service Frankfurt -Paris. On 14 December 2003 the German EuroCitys were anonimized, so was the Heinrich Heine and on 10 June 2007 the EuroCity was replaced by a highspeed service using the LGV-est.

== See also ==
- History of rail transport in France
- History of rail transport in Germany
- List of EuroCity services
- List of named passenger trains of Europe

== Works cited ==
- Hajt, Jörg (2001). Das grosse TEE Buch (in German). Bonn/Königswinter: Heel Verlag. ISBN 3-89365-948-X.
- Mertens, Maurice; Malaspina, Jean-Pierre (2007). La Légende des Trans Europ Express (in French). Vannes: LR Presse. ISBN 978-29-036514-5-9.
- Goette, Peter (2008). TEE-Züge in Deutschland (in German). Freiburg: EK-Verlag. ISBN 978-3-88255-698-8.
