= Comenius (train) =

Two EuroCity international express trains

Overview
- Service type: EuroCity (EC)
- Status: Operational
- Locale: Czech Republic; Germany; Hungary; Poland
- First service: 23 May 1993

Route
- Termini: Praha hl.n. / Budapest; Hamburg-Altona / Berlin / Kraków Główny
- Service frequency: Daily
- Train number(s): EC 170/171 / EC 174/175; EC 108/109 / EC 118/119

Technical
- Track gauge: 1,435 mm (4 ft 8 1/2 in)
- Electrification: 15 kV AC, 16.7 Hz (Germany)

The Comenius has been the name of two distinct EuroCity (EC) international express trains, both of them originating, terminating or passing through Prague, the capital of the Czech Republic.

Both of the Comenius trains have been named after John Amos Comenius (1592–1670), a Czech-speaking Moravian teacher, educator and writer.

Introduced in 1993, the first Comenius ran initially between Prague and Berlin, Germany. It was later extended from Prague further south, to Budapest, Hungary, and later still extended again, this time from Berlin to Hamburg, Germany. It was discontinued in 2000. The second Comenius was introduced in 2006, and links Prague with Kraków, Poland.

== History ==
=== First Comenius ===
In May 1993, there was a major reorganisation of the international train services through the Elbe valley. It involved the introduction of four daily EuroCity expresses. Two existing trains, the Hungaria (Budapest–Hamburg) and the Vindobona (Vienna–Berlin) were upgraded to become EuroCity services, the new EC Porta Bohemica replaced another existing train, the Primator (Prague–Berlin), and a new train, the Comenius, was added to the timetable, All of these changes took effect from 23 May 1993.

The EuroCity train numbers originally assigned to the Comenius were EC 170/171, but in June 1997 they were changed to EC 174/175 (a swapping of numbers with the EC Hungaria).

The first Comenius was discontinued in 2000.

=== Second Comenius ===
The second Comenius was introduced in 2006, and links Prague with Kraków, Poland.

On 8 August 2008, the southbound Comenius was involved in the Studénka train accident near Studénka, Moravian-Silesian Region, Czech Republic. The train derailed and eight people were killed with 64 others injured.

== Formation (consist) ==
=== First Comenius ===
From its inauguration until 27 May 1995, the first Comenius was made up of ČD coaches. From then until the train's withdrawal on 28 May 2000, its coaches were supplied by MÁV.

=== Second Comenius ===
Until 9 December 2007, the second Comenius, between Prague and Kraków, was operated using ČD and PKP coaches. Since then, there have also been ÖBB coaches in the train.

== See also ==
- History of rail transport in the Czech Republic
- History of rail transport in Germany
- History of rail transport in Hungary
- History of rail transport in Poland
- List of EuroCity services
- List of named passenger trains of Europe
