= Varsovia (train) =

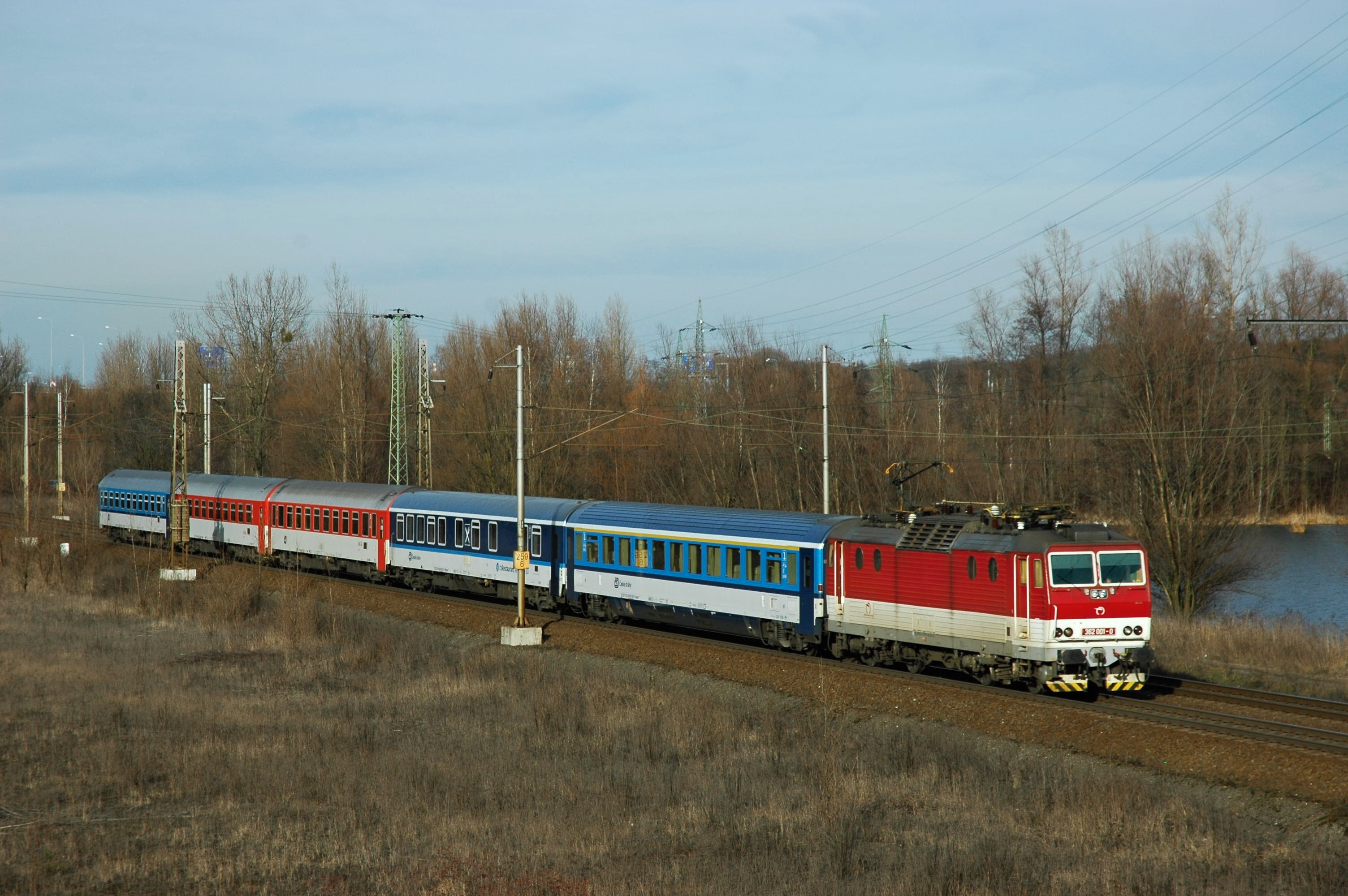
- Varsovia train near Ostrava, 2014

Overview
- Service type: EuroCity (EC) (1993–2002) (and since 2012)
- Status: Absorbed by Berlin-Warszawa-Express / Operational
- Locale: Poland; Germany; Czech Republic; Slovakia; Hungary
- First service: 23 May 1993
- Last service: 29 September 2002 (but revived in 2012)
- Successor: Berlin-Warszawa-Express / Operational

Route
- Termini: Warszawa Wschodnia; Berlin (1993–2002) / Budapest Keleti (since 2012)
- Service frequency: Daily
- Train number(s): EC 40/41 (1993–2002); EC 131/130 (since 2012)

Technical
- Track gauge: 1,435 mm (4 ft 8 1/2 in)
- Electrification: 25 kV AC, 50 Hz (Hungary)

Varsovia, the Neo-Latin word for Warsaw, Poland, has been the name of two distinct EuroCity international express trains, each of them originating and terminating in Warsaw.

== Routes ==
The first Varsovia ran between Warsaw and Berlin, Germany. Introduced in 1993, it was absorbed, minus its name, into the EuroCity Berlin-Warszawa-Express service in 2002.

In 2012, a second Varsovia was introduced to link Warsaw with Budapest, Hungary, as an extended replacement for the EC Moravia, which had run only between Ostrava in the Czech Republic and Budapest.

== See also ==
- Vindobona (train)
- History of rail transport in the Czech Republic
- History of rail transport in Germany
- History of rail transport in Poland
- History of rail transport in Slovakia
- List of EuroCity services
- List of named passenger trains of Europe
