= Porta Bohemica (train) =

EuroCity express train

Overview
- Service type: EuroCity (EC)
- Status: active
- Locale: Hungary; Slovakia; Czech Republic; Germany
- Predecessor: Primator, Vindobona
- First service: 14 December 2014
- Current operator(s): České dráhy, Deutsche Bahn

Route
- Termini: Budapest Keleti; Hamburg-Altona
- Stops: Praha hl.n., Berlin Hbf
- Service frequency: Daily
- Train number(s): EC 172/173

On-board services
- Disabled access: Wheelchair space and accessible toilet
- Seating arrangements: First class open; second class compartment and open
- Catering facilities: Dining car
- Baggage facilities: Bicycle transportation

Technical
- Track gauge: 1,435 mm (4 ft 8 1/2 in)
- Electrification: 15 kV AC, 16.7 Hz (Germany); 3 kV DC (Czech Republic); 25 kV AC, 50 Hz (Czech Rep., Slovakia, Hungary)

The Porta Bohemica is a EuroCity (EC) international express train. Since December 2014 it is operating between Hamburg-Altona and Budapest Keleti.

The train's name, Porta Bohemica (Czech: Brána Čech; German: Böhmische Pforte), is the Latin word for the point where the Elbe river begins its passage through the České Středohoří (Central Bohemian Uplands or Bohemian Central Uplands).

From 1993 to 2003, a predecessor train of the same name ran between Prague, the capital of the Czech Republic, and a number of different termini in northern Germany.

== Route ==
The train takes the route via Berlin Hbf, Dresden Hbf, Praha hl.n., Brno hl.n. and Bratislava hl.st. A sister train named Jan Jesenius, composed of Hungarian and German rolling stock, is running two hours earlier from Budapest and two hours later from Hamburg.

== History ==
In May 1993, there was a major reorganisation of the international train services through the Elbe valley. It involved the introduction of four daily EuroCity expresses. Two existing trains, the Hungaria (Budapest–Hamburg) and the Vindobona (Vienna–Berlin) were upgraded to become EuroCity services, a new train, the EC Comenius (Prague–Berlin), was added to the timetable, and the Porta Bohemica replaced another existing train, the Primator (Prague–Berlin). All of these changes took effect from 23 May 1993.

Initially, the Porta Bohemica ran between Praha-Holešovice in Prague and Hamburg-Altona in Hamburg. The northbound train, EC 176, was the last of the four daily northbound Elbe valley EuroCity services to leave Prague, in the early afternoon. The southbound train, EC 177, left Hamburg shortly after 08:00.

On 27 May 1995, the northern terminus of the Porta Bohemica was moved south, to Nauen, Germany (on the northwestern outskirts of Berlin), and the southern terminus in Prague was switched from Praha-Holešovice to Praha hl.n.. On 24 May 1998, the northern terminus was moved back to Hamburg, and in 2001 it was moved even further north, to Westerland (Sylt), also in Germany. At the end of the following year, in December 2002, it was moved yet again, back to Hamburg for the second time.

On 14 December 2003, all of the EuroCity trains running through the Elbe valley lost their names. Trains EC 176/177 continued to run without names for three years until 10 December 2006. But when the naming of the Elbe valley EuroCity trains was reintroduced, the name Porta Bohemica was not reused.

From 14 December 2014, a two-hourly clock-face schedule was introduced between Prague and Budapest, alternating with a railjet between Prague and Graz every other hour. This meant that the EC 172/173 Vindobona was replaced by the EC 172/173 Porta Bohemica Hamburg-Altona—Budapest Keleti. The connection in Praha to a Railjet via Wien Hauptbahnhof to Graz Hauptbahnhof and vice versa includes an hour of layover.

== Formation (consist) ==
The train is currently hauled between Hamburg and Dresden by a DB Class 101 locomotive, between Dresden and Prague by a ČD class 371 locomotive and between Prague and Budapest by a ČD Class 380 locomotive. It is composed of rolling stock of the Czech Railways, one first class open coach Ampz^{143}, one dining car WRmz^{815}, five second class compartment coaches Bmz^{241/245}. A German second class open coach Bpmbdz^{294} offers wheelchair space and bicycle transportation. Seasonally, another German second class open coach Bpmz^{294} without these special amenities is added.

- Formation EC 172
- Formation EC 173

== See also ==
- History of rail transport in the Czech Republic
- History of rail transport in Germany
- List of EuroCity services
- List of named passenger trains of Europe
