= Prague (disambiguation) =

Prague is the capital of the Czech Republic.

Prague may also refer to:

== Places in the United States ==
- Prague, Nebraska
- Prague, Oklahoma
- New Prague, Minnesota

== Arts and entertainment ==
- Infant Jesus of Prague, a statue of Jesus in Prague, Czech Republic
- Prague (novel), a 2002 novel by Arthur Phillips
- Prague Fatale, a 2011 novel by Philip Kerr
- Prague (1992 film), a UK/French film directed by Ian Sellar
- Prague (2006 film), a Danish film starring Mads Mikkelsen
- Prague (2013 film), a Hindi romance film
- "Prague" (Succession), a 2018 television episode
- Mozart's Symphony No. 38 (Mozart), subtitled Prague
- Prague (band), a Japanese rock band
- "Prague", a 1992 song by Mega City Four, covered by Muse

== Other ==
- The Prague Offensive, the last major European battle of World War II
- Edith Prague (1925–2021), American politician

== See also ==
- Praha (disambiguation)
