= DB Class 403 =

DB Class 403 may refer to:

- DB Class 403 (1973), a train class in Germany (1973-1993)
- DB Class 403 or ICE 3, a high speed train class in Germany (since 1999)
