= Primator =

Primator may refer to:

- Primátor, a beer by the Náchod Brewery
- Primator, a minor character from Mighty Morphin Power Rangers
- Primator (train), a train that ran between Prague and Berlin
