= Sobieski (train) =

Polish–Czech–Austrian international train service

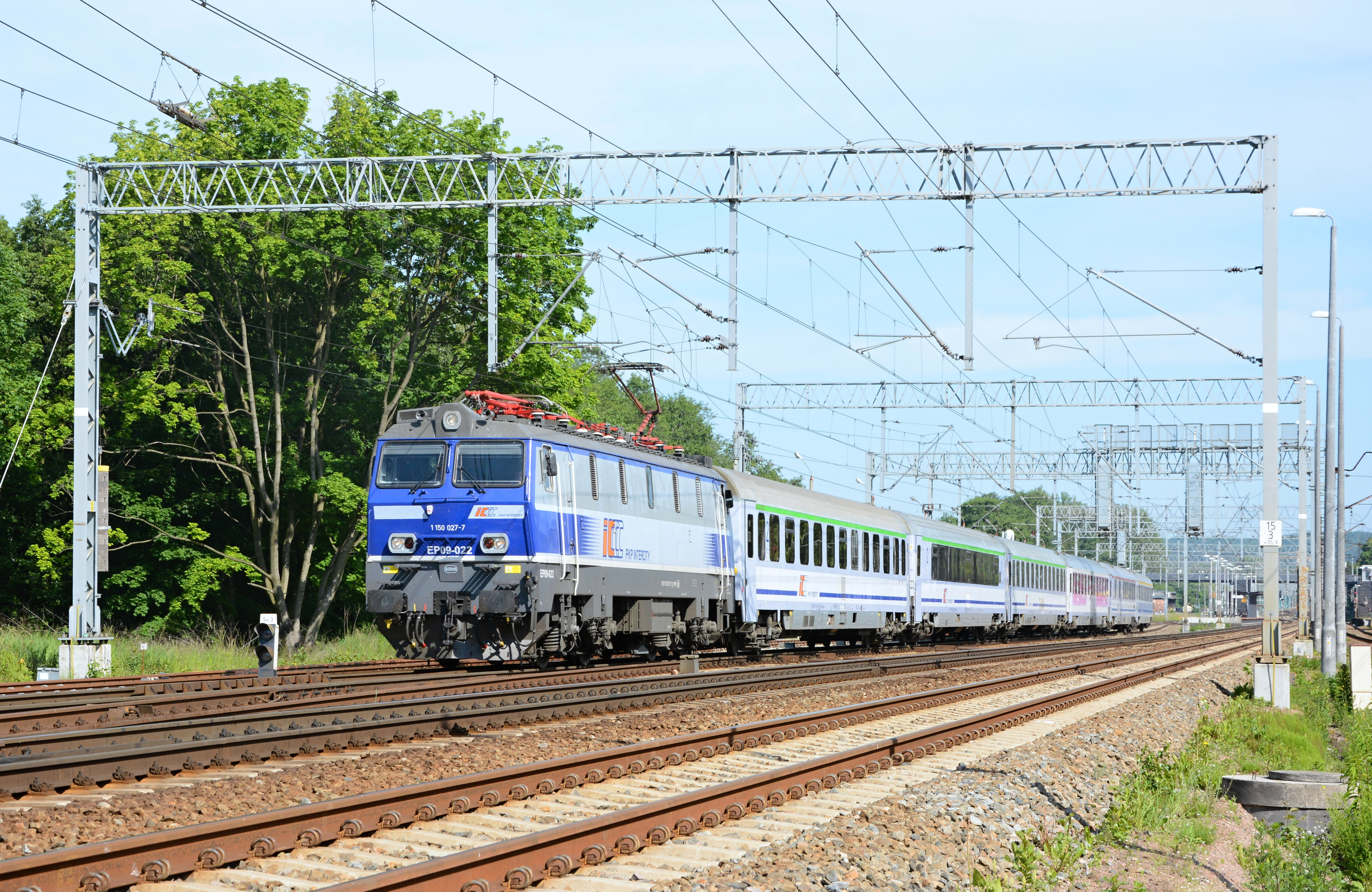
- Sobieski, Gdynia Orłowo (2016)

Overview
- Service type: EuroCity (EC), InterCity (IC)
- Status: Operational
- Locale: Austria, Czech Republic, Poland
- First service: 1994

Route
- Termini: Warszawa Wschodnia; Wien Westbahnhof
- Stops: 25
- Distance travelled: 684 km (425 mi)
- Average journey time: 8h 47min
- Service frequency: Daily
- Train number: EC/IC 106/107

Technical
- Track gauge: 1,435 mm (4 ft 8 1/2 in)

The Sobieski is a EuroCity (EC) international express train that was introduced in 1994. It runs between Vienna, the capital of Austria, and Warsaw, the capital of Poland, via the Czech Republic.

The train's name honours the Sobieski family, or the House of Sobieski, a notable family of Polish nobility.

As of 2026, the northbound train departs at about 05:30 and the southbound train shortly after 13:30. Both trains will arrive at their destinations after a journey time of approximately eight and a half hours.

== See also ==
- History of rail transport in Austria
- History of rail transport in the Czech Republic
- History of rail transport in Poland
- List of EuroCity services
- List of named passenger trains of Europe
