= Praha (disambiguation) =

Praha is Czech for the city of Prague.

Praha may also refer to:

- Praha, Slovakia, a village and municipality
- Praha, Texas, US, an unincorporated community
- Praha (Brdy), a mountain in the Brdy range, Czech Republic
- Praha (train), a Warsaw-Prague express train since 1993
- 2367 Praha, a main-belt asteroid
- Praha Spring, another name for Prague Spring
