= Praha (train) =

Polish–Czech international train service

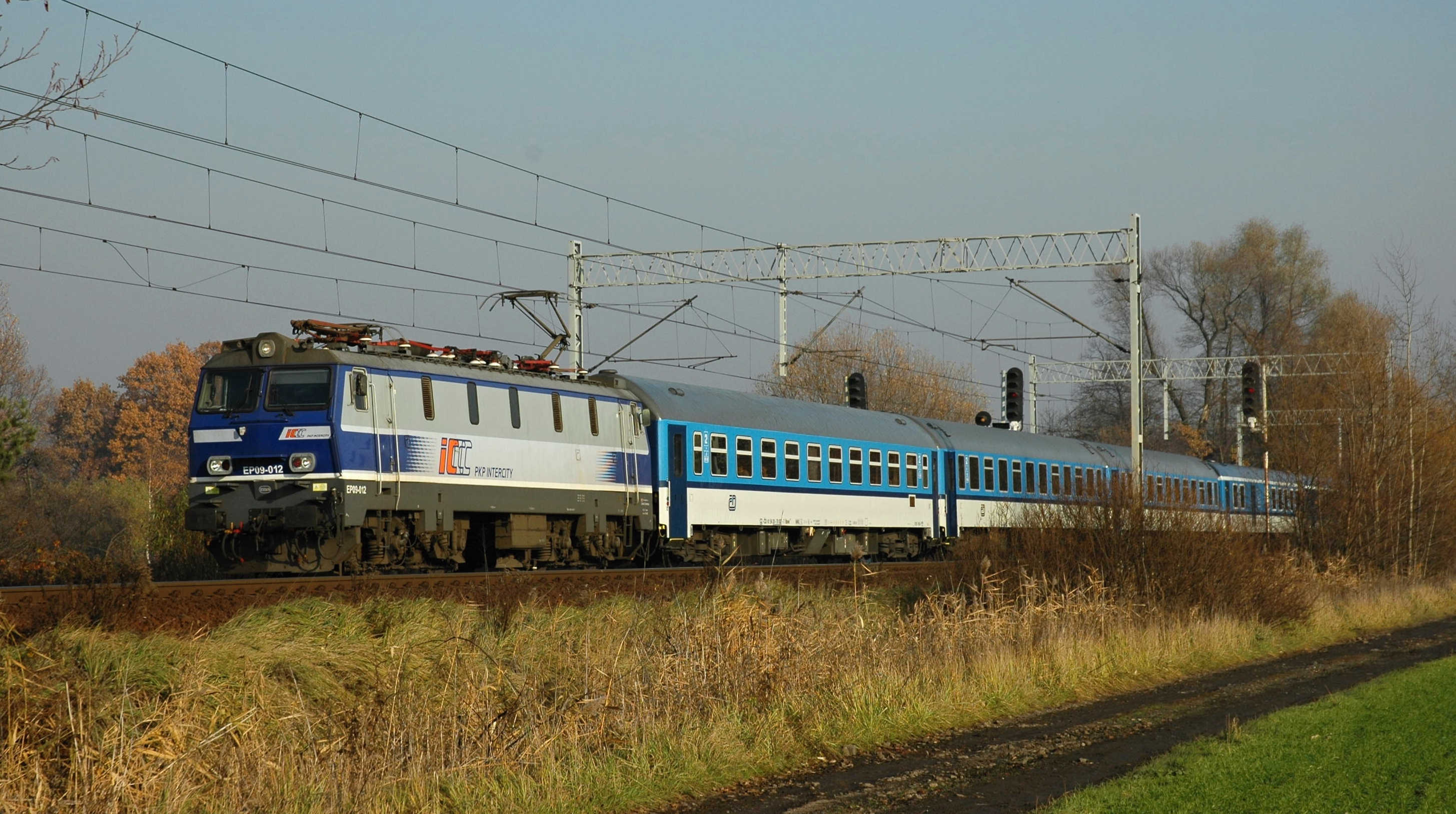
- Praha (2012)

Overview
- Service type: EuroCity (EC)
- Status: Operational
- Locale: Poland; Czech Republic
- First service: 1993

Route
- Termini: Warszawa Wschodnia; Praha hl.n.
- Distance travelled: 710 km (440 mi)
- Service frequency: Daily
- Train numbers: EC 106/107; EC 110/111

Technical
- Track gauge: 1,435 mm (4 ft 8 1/2 in)

The Praha is a EuroCity international express train. Introduced in 1993, it runs between Warsaw, the capital of Poland, and Prague, the capital of the Czech Republic. The train is named Praha, the Czech word for Prague

As of 2013, the southbound train departs at shortly after 09:00 and the northbound train at shortly after 10:00. Both trains arrive at their destinations after a journey time of approximately eight and a half hours.

== See also ==
- History of rail transport in the Czech Republic
- History of rail transport in Poland
- List of EuroCity services
- List of named passenger trains of Europe
