= Lufthansa Airport Express =

Former express train service in Germany

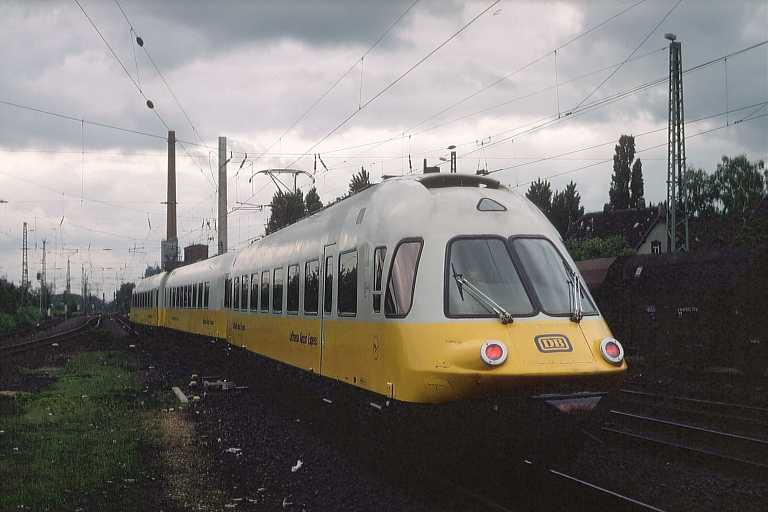
- Lufthansa Airport Express in Kelsterbach, 1993

Overview
- Service type: Special express, DB designation LH/TEE (1982–1987); InterCity (IC) (1987–1993)
- Status: Discontinued
- Locale: Germany
- First service: 27 March 1982
- Last service: 22 May 1993
- Former operator: Deutsche Bundesbahn /Lufthansa

Route
- Distance travelled: 254 km

Technical
- Track gauge: 1,435 mm (4 ft 8 1/2 in)
- Electrification: 15 kV 16,7 Hz (Germany)

The Lufthansa Airport Express was an express train service in Germany, operated by Deutsche Bundesbahn (German Federal Railway, or DB) on behalf of the German airline Lufthansa. Initially linking Düsseldorf and Frankfurt am Main Flughafen (Frankfurt Airport), service was later extended to Stuttgart. The airline provided the on-board customer service staff, and access was limited to Lufthansa customers taking airplane flights into or out of Frankfurt or Düsseldorf airports.

== Preparations ==
In 1981 the German airline Lufthansa wanted to lower the costs of the very expensive shorthaul flights between Düsseldorf Airport and Frankfurt am Main, and proposed replacing these flights with rail transport. The Deutsche Bundesbahn agreed as the proposal eliminated a problem of its own; the service provided an opportunity to return its Class 403 electric multiple units (EMUs) to revenue service. The units had previously proven ill-suited to the two-class InterCity system, and were placed in storage. On 13 and 16 February 1981, the Class 403 made test runs as TEE Goethe on the West Rhine Railway. The Class 403, consisting of three EMUs only, were refurbished and re-fitted with the same business class seats as Lufthansa's McDonnell Douglas DC-10s. The exteriors were painted in Lufthansa's corporate color scheme of light gray and yellow.

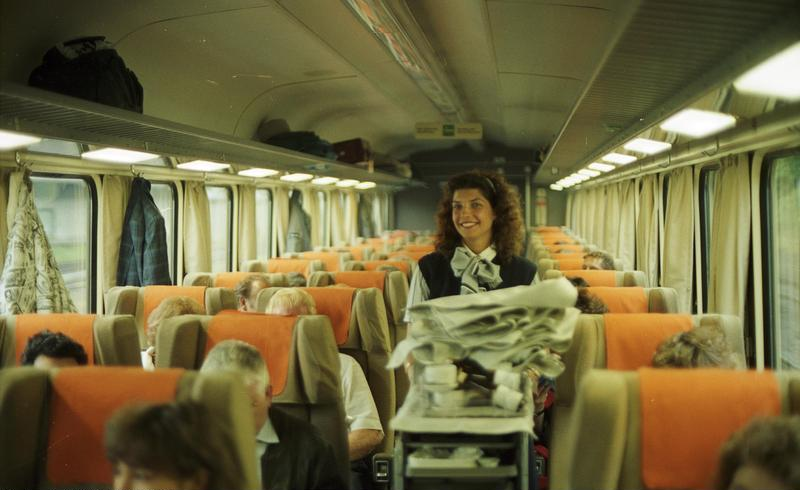
Lufthansa Airport Express with business class seats

== Flight level zero ==
On 27 March 1982, the Lufthansa Airport Express started with four trips a day in each direction. Initially starting at Düsseldorf Hbf, and calling at Köln Deutz station, Köln Hbf and the West German capital Bonn, one year later the route was extended northward to Düsseldorf Flughafen (Düsseldorf Airport) station. Although the Lufthansa Airport Express was integrated into Lufthansa's reservation system using flight numbers and never integrated in the TEE booking office, the Deutsche Bundesbahn classified the trains as Trans Europ Express in their operation. This meant a double numbering of the trains, e.g. "Flight" LH 1001 was TEE 61 for railway staff. The "flights" at flight level zero were carried out by two EMUs using the West Rhine Railway, whilst the third one received maintenance. The trains were not officially TEEs and the Thomas Cook Continental Timetable identified the Lufthansa Airport Express not as TEEs but as "special trains for Lufthansa passengers holding air tickets. Ordinary rail tickets [are] not valid on these trains."

Timetable

LH 1001 TEE 61	LH 1003 TEE 63	LH 1005 TEE 65	LH 1007 TEE 67	station	km	LH 1002 TEE 62	LH 1004 TEE 64	LH 1006 TEE 66	LH 1008 TEE 68
06:17	09:46	13:17	17:58	Düsseldorf Hbf	0	11:32	15:31	19:01	23:30
06:36	10:07	13:37	18:16	Köln Deutz	39.5	11:08	15:08	18:38	23:07
06:41	10:11	13:41	18:22	Köln Hbf	40	11:04	15:04	18:35	23:03
06:59	10:19	13:59	18:41	Bonn Hbf	74	10:43	14:43	18:15	22:43
08:42	12:08	15:38	20:20	Frankfurt Flughafen	254	09:07	13:11	16:38	21:06

On 1 June 1986, the "flight" and train numbers were unified; LH 1001 became train number TEE 1001, etc. One year later the EuroCity network replaced most TEEs (including all remaining TEEs in Germany), so DB dropped the designation "TEE" for the LHAE service.

The service provided a non-stop journey linking the West-German capital Bonn with the international airport in Frankfurt. North of Bonn it called in the city centres rather than at the airports outside. On board, the passengers were served by Lufthansa stewardesses like in an airplane. It appeared to be successful in both passenger figures and costs compared to the Boeing 737 used before. In the summer of 1988 the seating capacity was enlarged.

First iteration of the locomotive-hauled Lufthansa Airport Express (1990)

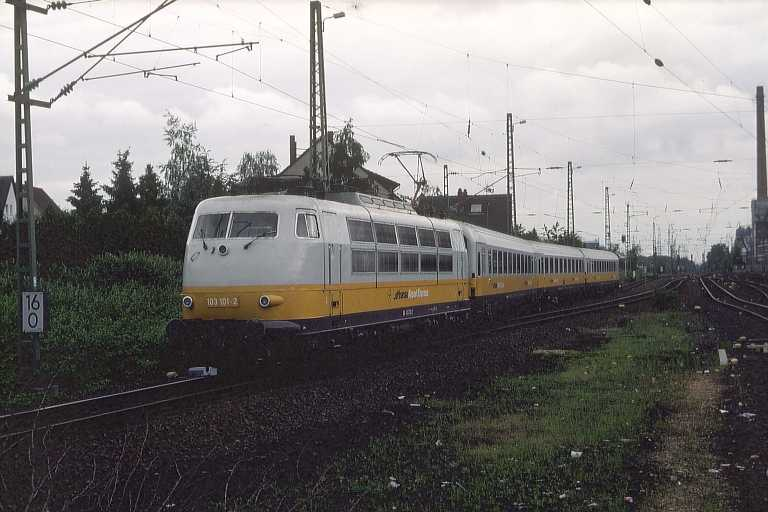
Second variant, using a faster class 103 locomotive

In 1990, the same formula was introduced between Frankfurt Airport and Stuttgart Hauptbahnhof. With the extension to the south more rolling stock was needed, so one class 111 electric locomotive (111 049) was repainted in Lufthansa livery and coaches were refurbished in the same way as the EMUs.

With the opening of the Mannheim–Stuttgart high-speed railway in 1991, the class 111 locomotive with a top speed of 160 km/h was replaced by a class 103 machine, 103 101.

Despite festivities celebrating the tenth anniversary of the Lufthansa Airport Express in 1992, with promotional statements addressing the success, the service ended on 22 May 1993. The combination of the poor financial state of Lufthansa and the need for an expensive midlife overhaul of the 1973-built EMUs, led to the withdrawal of the service. It was later revived as AIRail Service, which however uses unmodified Deutsche Bahn trains on the ordinary services, rather than specialized trains only carrying flight passengers.

== Works cited ==
- Hajt, Jörg (2001). Das grosse TEE Buch (in German). Bonn/Königswinter: Heel Verlag. ISBN 3-89365-948-X.
- Mertens, Maurice; Malaspina, Jean-Pierre (2007). La Légende des Trans Europ Express (in French). Vannes: LR Presse. ISBN 978-29-036514-5-9.
- Goette, Peter (2008). TEE-Züge in Deutschland (in German). Freiburg: EK-Verlag. ISBN 978-3-88255-698-8.
