= DB Class 403 (1973) =

Retired Train

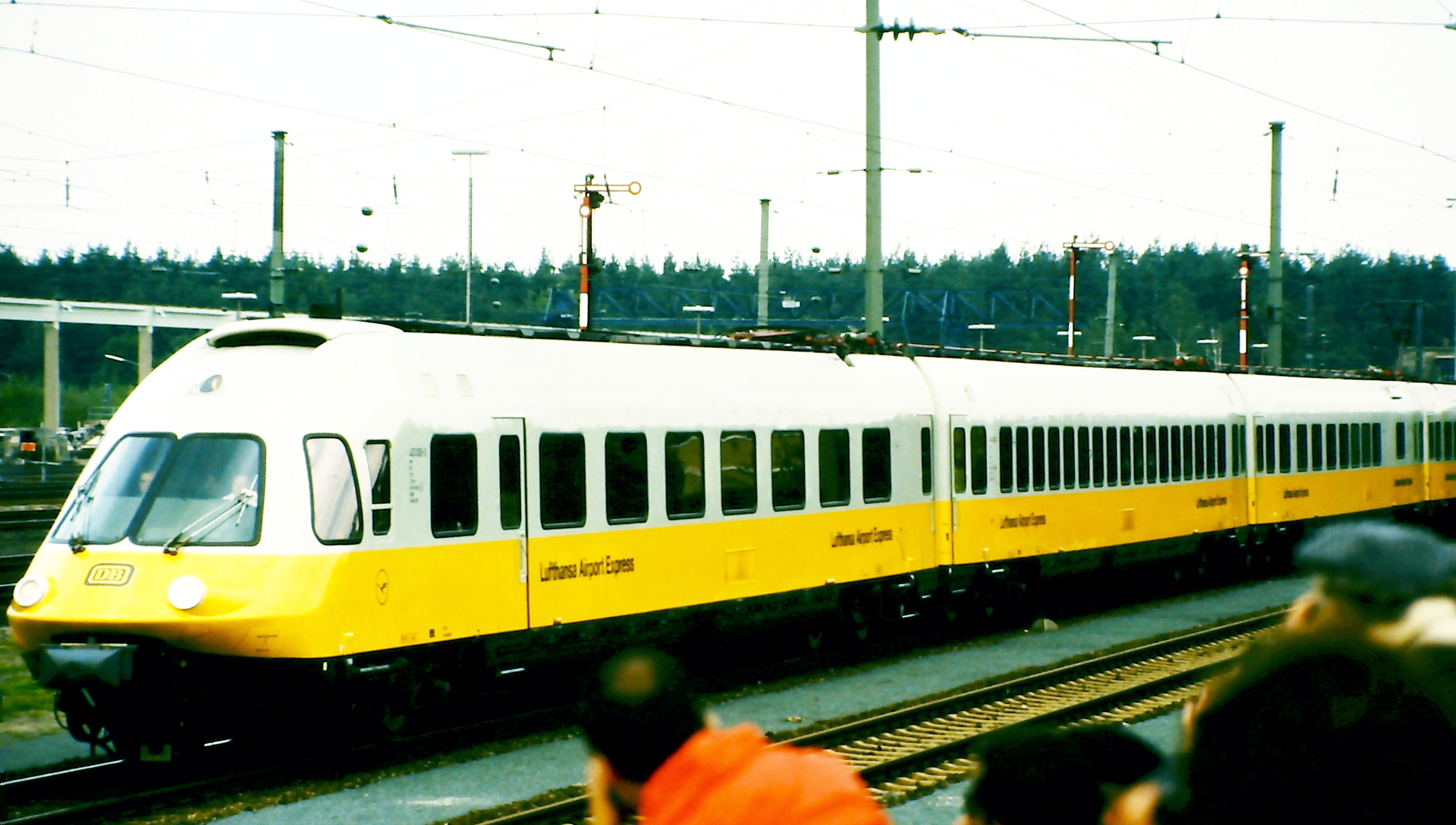
- DB Class 403 in Lufthansa livery
- In service: 1972–1993
- Manufacturers: LHB, MBB, AEG, BBC, Siemens
- Constructed: 1972
- Number built: 3
- Fleet numbers: ET 403/404 001–003

Specifications
- Maximum speed: 220 km/h (140 mph); 200 km/h (120 mph) in service
- Weight: Service: 235.7 t (232.0 long tons; 259.8 short tons)
- Traction motors: 4 per car
- Power output: Continuous: 3,840 kW (5,150 hp)
- Tractive effort: Starting: 200 kN (45,000 lb_{f})
- Transmission: Quill drive
- Electric system: 15 kV 16.7 Hz AC Catenary
- Current collection: Pantograph
- UIC classification: Bo′Bo′+Bo′Bo′+Bo′Bo′+Bo′Bo′
- Braking system: Discs
- Safety systems: SiFa, LZB, AFB, Indusi
- Coupling system: Scharfenberg
- Track gauge: 1,435 mm (4 ft 8 1/2 in)

The DB Class 403 was a series of three electric multiple units commissioned by the Deutsche Bundesbahn in the 1970s, an early predecessor of the Intercity-Express as a high-speed train. The units were mainly used for InterCity services and again by the Lufthansa airline in the 1980s. Due to the distinctive design of its front section, the unit was nicknamed the "Donald Duck". They were designed for operational speeds of up to 220 km/h, a speed which was also attained in extensive test drives, but they were limited to 200 km/h in regular DB service.

== Development ==
After the development and introduction of the E03 highspeed-locomotive the Deutsche Bundesbahn ordered the railway industry to propose designs for an Elektro Triebwagen (highspeed electric multiple unit) capable to operate with 200 km/h on the planned InterCity network. On 24 May 1970 the Deutsche Bundesbahn decided to order three prototypes and ordered various German companies to build the trains. Linke-Hoffmann-Busch built six driving cars, designated as class 403.0, MBB built three coaches (class 404.0) and three dining cars (class 404.1). The bogies were built by MAN and the electric equipment was built by AEG, BBC and Siemens. All axles of the train were powered and the train featured a tilting mechanism as many new developments in the early 1970s, e.g. the British Advanced Passenger Train. With the twelve cars built three prototype electric multiple units consisting of 1 driving car + 1 coach + 1 dining car + 1 driving car were formed:

- EMU 1: 403 001 + 404 001 + 404 101 + 403 002
- EMU 2: 403 003 + 404 002 + 404 102 + 403 004
- EMU 3: 403 005 + 404 003 + 404 103 + 403 006

Thanks to the powered bogies on every car the train could be enlarged with extra coaches. The concept of powered bogies was applied to the InterCityExpress 3, also designated as class 403, some decades later.

	Class 403.0	Class 404.0	Class 404.1	Class 403.0
Type	Avm	Apm	ARpm	Avm
Interior	Compartments	Coach	Coach and Restaurant	Compartments
DB: 183 Seats	45 (1×4 + 1×5 + 6×6)	51	18 (1st class) + 24 (Restaurant)	45 (1×4 + 1×5 + 6×6)
LH after 1982 refurbishment: 171 Seats	39 (1×4 + 1×5 + 5×6 + Luggage)	51	42 (Bar only)	39 (1×4 + 1×5 + 5×6 + Luggage)
LH after 1988 refurbishment: 151 Seats	35 (Galley + 1×5 + 5×6 + Luggage)	45	36 (Bar only)	35 (Galley + 1×5 + 5×6 + Luggage)

== InterCity ==
The first train was handed over to DB on 2 March 1973 and trial runs were carried out between 28 November 1973 and 8 August 1974. The tilting mechanism was shut off because it did not fulfil expectations. The revenue service started on 29 September 1974 as InterCity Riemenschneider, Nordwind, Südwind, Albrecht Dürer and Hermes on the line between Bremen and Munich. Due to the lack of suitable high-speed tracks, the trains were able to reach their maximum velocity between Munich and Augsburg only. The impossibility of reacting to fluctuating passenger numbers soon made the trainsets prohibitive and impractical. They were removed from IC services in 1979 and replaced by Class 111 locomotives, when the IC '79 scheme introduced the 2nd class on previously 1st class-only IC services.

== Lufthansa Airport Express ==
In 1981 Lufthansa wanted to replace the very expensive Düsseldorf - Frankfurt shorthaul flights by rail transport. Deutsche Bundesbahn agreed and eliminated their problem, the Class 403 not bringing revenues, at once. Trials on the proposed route, the West Rhine Railway, were carried out on 13 and 16 February 1981. The trains were re-fitted to Lufthansa standards and received a grey-yellow Lufthansa livery. Instead of a kitchen, airplane like on-board galleys were installed. The seats were replaced by DC-10 business class seats. On 28 March 1982 the ET 403 were recommissioned as the Lufthansa Airport Express, a shuttle service connecting the airports of Düsseldorf and Frankfurt along the picturesque West Rhine Railway via Bonn Hauptbahnhof. Usage ended in 1993 due to increasing corrosion of the aluminium sheets. All trains were finally sold by the Deutsche Bahn in 2001 and have fallen into disrepair. The technical concept of separately driven cars was resumed in the design of the ICE 3, also classified as Class 403.

== Gallery ==
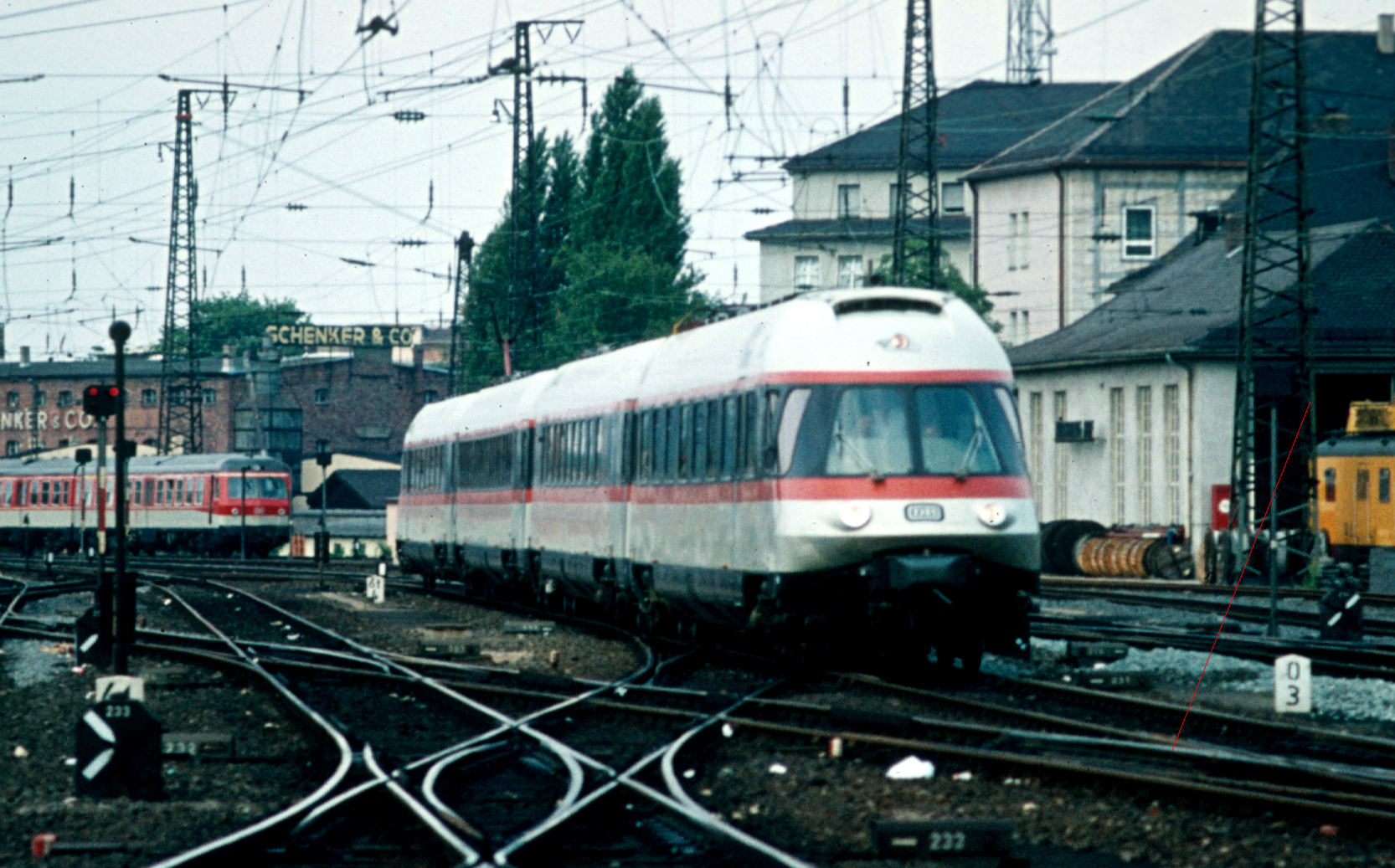
1975 with original paint

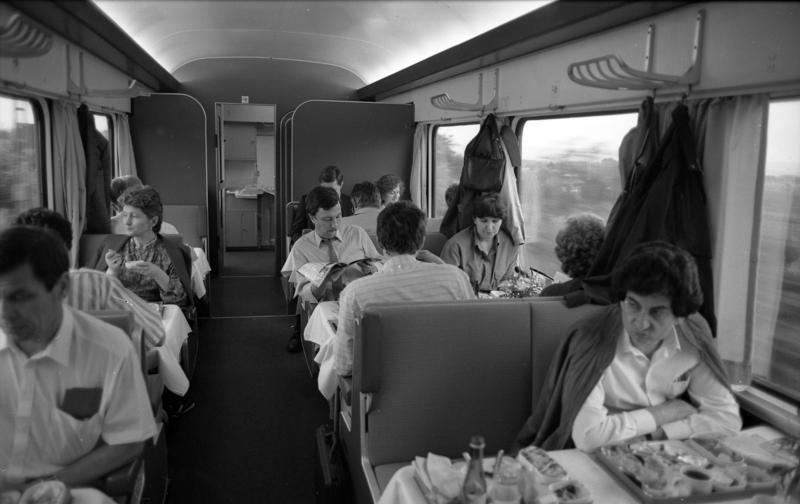
In the dining car, 1988

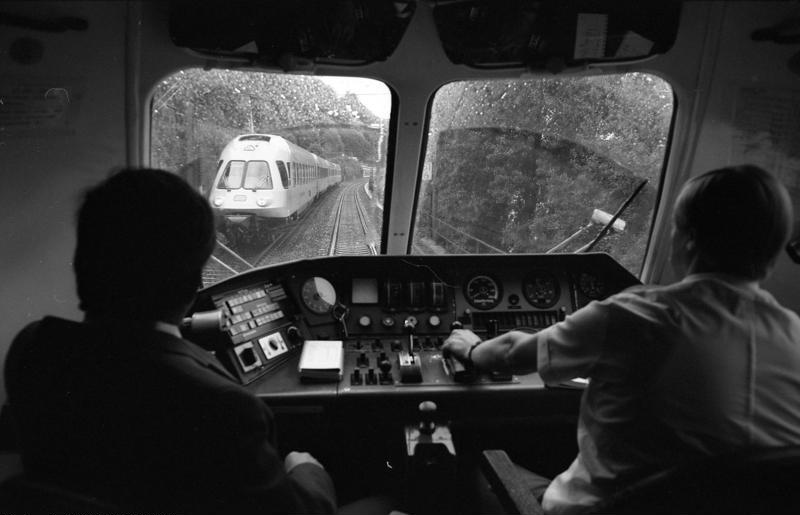
In the driver's cabin, 1988

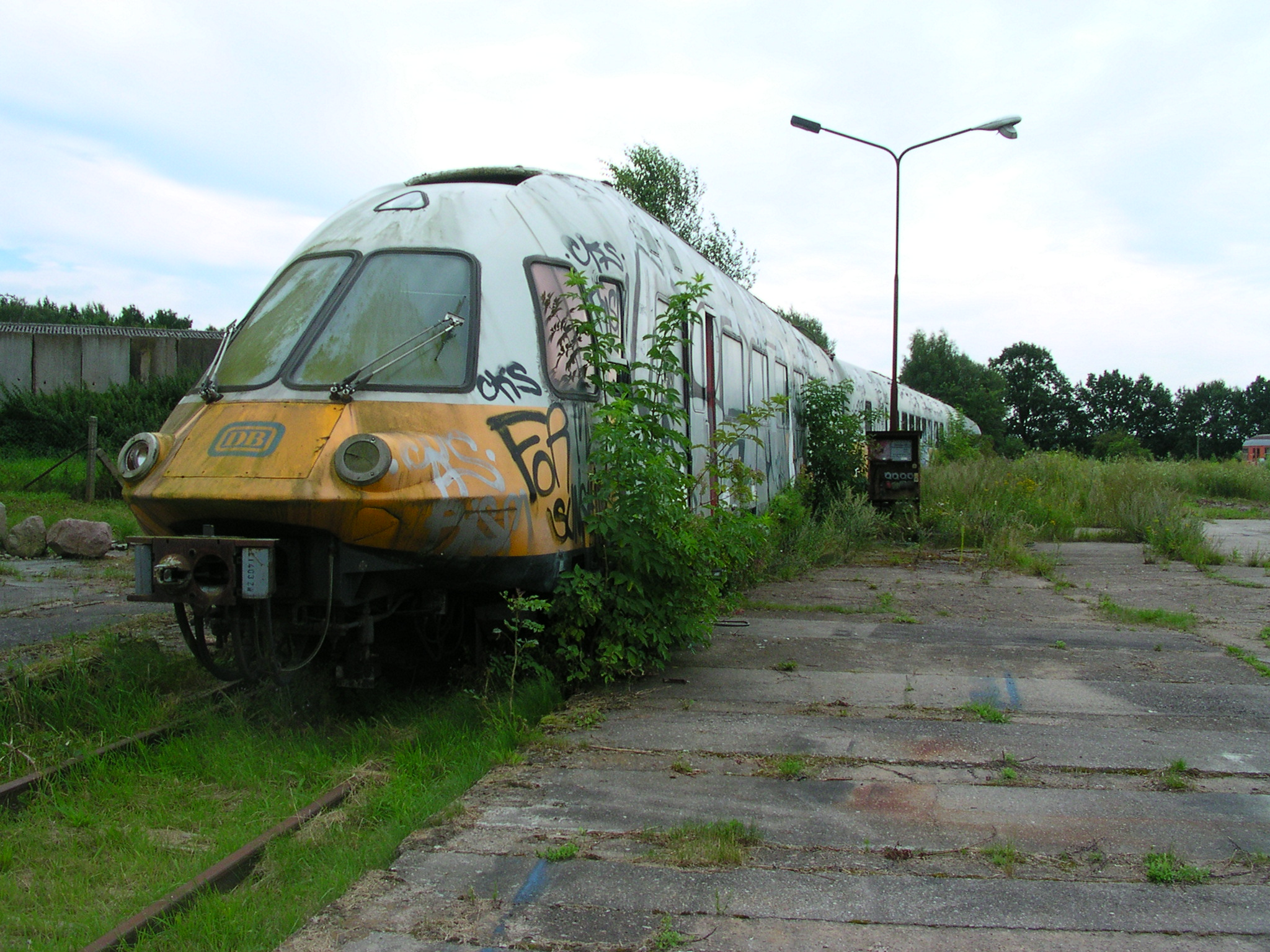
Derelict 403 001 at Putlitz, 2007

== Works cited ==
- Hajt, Jörg (2001). Das grosse TEE Buch (in German). Bonn/Königswinter: Heel Verlag. ISBN 3-89365-948-X.
- Goette, Peter (2008). TEE-Züge in Deutschland (in German). Freiburg: EK-Verlag. ISBN 978-3-88255-698-8.
- Mertens, Maurice; Malaspina, Jean-Pierre (2007). La Légende des Trans Europ Express (in French). Vannes: LR Presse. ISBN 978-29-036514-5-9.
