= Primator (train) =

Overview
- Service type: Interexpress (IEx) (1986–ca. 1990); Schnellzug (D) (ca. 1990–1993)
- Status: Replaced by EuroCity
- Locale: Czechoslovakia / Czech Republic; GDR / Germany
- Predecessor: Progress
- First service: 1986
- Last service: 1993
- Successor: EC Porta Bohemica

Route
- Termini: Praha hl.n. Berlin-Lichtenberg
- Service frequency: Daily
- Train numbers: IEx 76/77 (1986–1991); D478/479 (1991–1993)

Technical
- Track gauge: 1,435 mm (4 ft 8 1/2 in)
- Electrification: 15 kV AC, 16.7 Hz (Germany)

The Primator was an international express train. Introduced in 1986, it ran between Prague, then the capital of Czechoslovakia, and East Berlin, then the capital of the German Democratic Republic (GDR).

Following the major political changes that took place in Central Europe in the second half of 1989, Prague became the capital of the Czech Republic, East Berlin was absorbed by Berlin and the GDR by Germany.

In 1993, under the influence of all of these changes, the Primator was replaced by a new EuroCity train, the Porta Bohemica.

== History ==
The Primator first ran in 1986. Initially, it was categorised as one of the new top-of-the-line Interexpress services, numbered IEx 76/77.

The train ran between Praha hl.n. in Prague and Berlin-Lichtenberg in East Berlin, on the route and in the time slots previously used by another train, Progress, which was rescheduled to different time slots.

In 1991, the Interexpress category was discontinued, and the Primator was recategorised as an Express (Ex) (Czechoslovakia) / Schnellzug (D) (Germany).

In 1993, as part of a reorganisation of international train services through the Elbe valley, the Primator was replaced by the new EC Porta Bohemia.

== See also ==
- History of rail transport in the Czech Republic
- History of rail transport in Germany
- List of named passenger trains of Europe
