= Karwendel (train) =

German-Austrian express train service

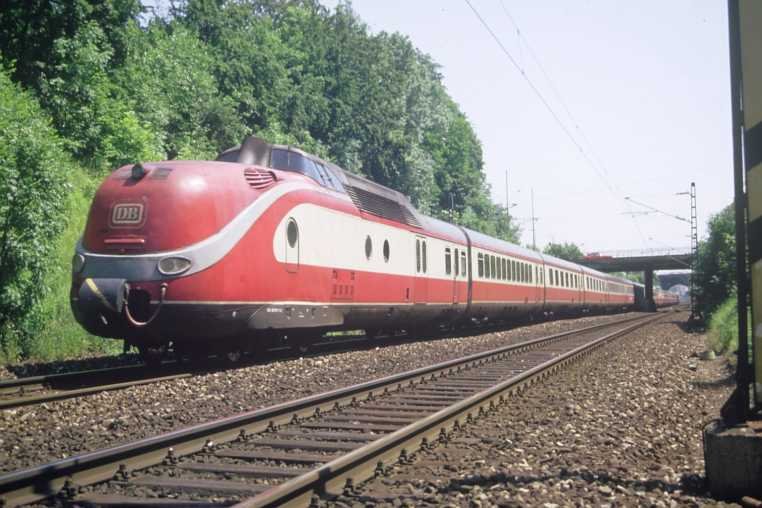
- VT 11.5 in DB Touristik livery, Munich (1986)

Overview
- Service type: D-Zug; (1930-1940); Ft/ICt touristic train; (1969–1979); Intercity (IC); (1979-1987 and 1988–2007); EuroCity (EC); (1987–1988); ICE; (2007-2017、2018-)
- Locale: Germany; Austria
- First service: 1930
- Current operator(s): Deutsche Bahn
- Former operator(s): Deutsche Reichsbahn; Deutsche Bundesbahn

Route
- Termini: Berlin-Gesundbrunnen; Innsbruck/Seefeld in Tirol
- Stops: Halle (Saale), Jena Paradies, Nuremberg, Munich
- Train number(s): ICE 1206/1207
- Line(s) used: Karwendelbahn

Technical
- Rolling stock: DRG E 16 (1930-1940); DB Class VT 11.5 (1969-1979); DB Class 103/111 (from 1979); ICE T (since 2008)
- Track gauge: 1,435 mm (4 ft 8 1/2 in)
- Electrification: 15 kV AC

The Karwendel is an international named express train service between Germany and Austria. The train was named after the Karwendel mountain range forming the German-Austrian border south of Garmisch-Partenkirchen, which it passes on the Mittenwald Railway (Karwendelbahn). Introduced in 1930, it is currently labelled as an Intercity-Express train connection operated by Deutsche Bahn AG.

== History ==
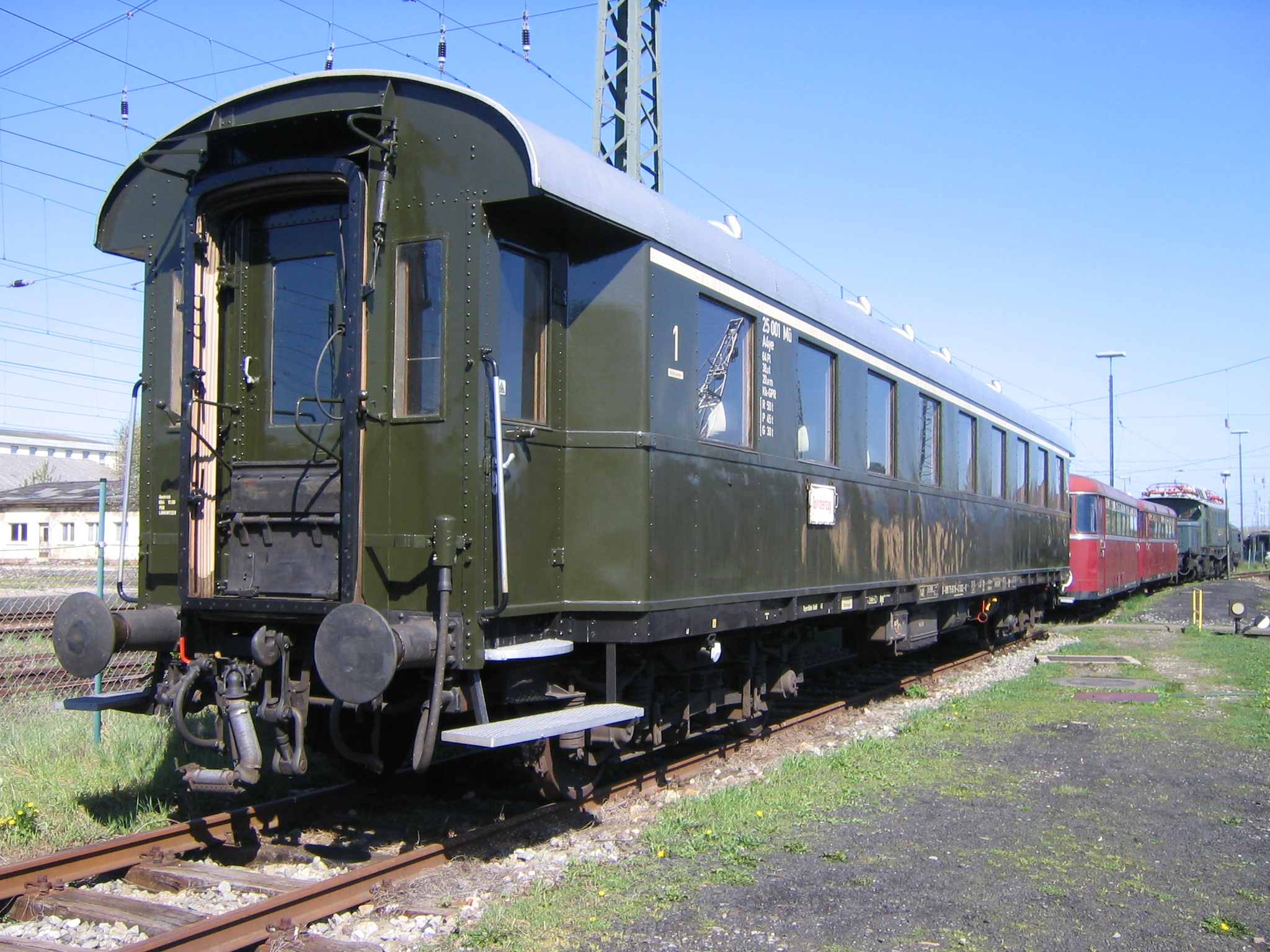
Pre-war Karwendel-Express car, on display at the Bavarian Railway Museum, Nördlingen

Since the opening of the Mittenwald Railway line in 1912, train service was provided to reach the tourist resorts in the Karwendel range such as Mittenwald and Seefeld in Tirol. First D-Zug express trains ran from 1925 onwards on the electrified Munich–Garmisch-Partenkirchen railway. In 1930 the Deutsche Reichsbahn introduced the Karwendel-Express, linking Munich with Innsbruck via the scenic Karwendelbahn route through the mountains with the border crossing at Mittenwald. Special passenger cars were built, calling at the 1936 Winter Olympics venues in Garmisch-Partenkirchen. The operation ceased in World War II.

After the war, D-Zug service continued from Munich to Seefeld and Innsbruck. In 1969 the Deutsche Bundesbahn reintroduced the Ft Karwendel train using VT 11.5 TEE diesel multiple units. The Saturday only train was classified as package tour touristtrain serving several wintersport resorts along the Karwendelbahn between Garmisch and Seefeld. The service started in Frankfurt am Main, much farther north then the pre-war start at Munich. From the introduction of the Intercity system in 1971 the train was named ICt Karwendel.

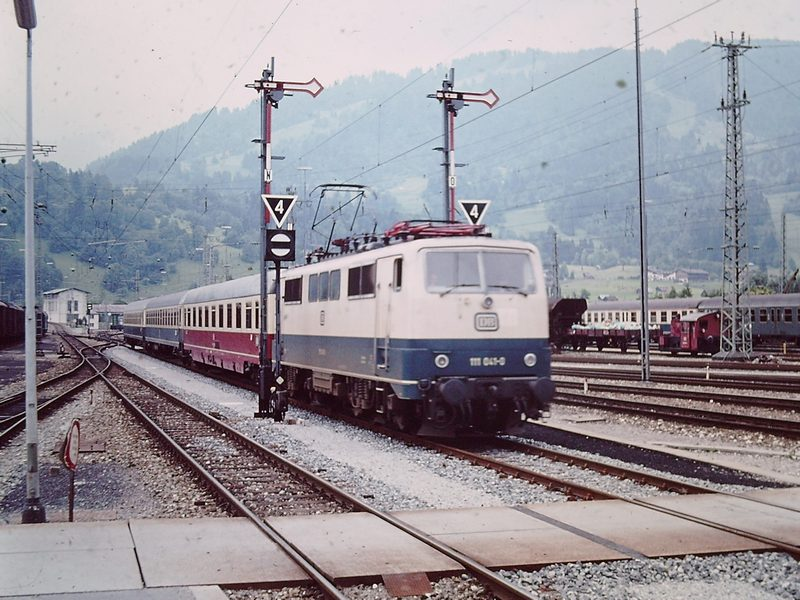
DB Class 111 with IC Karwendel in Garmisch-Partenkirchen (1983)

In May 1979 a daily Intercity service from Bremen to Innsbruck named IC Karwendel has been introduced, hauled by DB Class 103 and 111 electric locomotives. On 31 May 1987 it was one of the initial EuroCity services. The EuroCity started as far north as Hamburg but its initial southern terminus Innsbruck was already changed to Seefeld by September 1987 and after only one year as EuroCity the train was reconverted into an Intercity.

Since 2008 the Karwendel has been an ICE service using ICE T (DB Class 411) high-speed electric multiple units, with Berlin the northern terminus and serving the region south of Munich only at weekends.

In July 2017, the Murnau Mayor Rolf Beuting was informed that the railway is planning the hiring of the ICE train pair Munich-Innsbruck. Only two train pairs from the Ruhr area and Hamburg-Berlin to Garmisch-Partenkirchen are to remain. The Karwendel would then lose its long-distance train in Mittenwald and Seefeld. The Deutsche Bahn states as justification that the train is uneconomical because of decreasing numbers of passengers. In addition, he did not fit into the vehicle revolutions after the opening of the Erfurt-Nuremberg High Speed Railway. The passengers from the north benefited from the 1/2 hours shorter travel time. The mayors of the Bavarian and Tyrolean neighboring communities protest against the decision. They fear that holiday guests, for whom a connection without change is important, will avoid the Karwendel area in the future. According to the mayor, around 25 to 25% of guests currently travel to Mittenwald by train. The service is restored in December 2018.

== Works cited ==
- Berndt, Torsten (2002). Reisen 1. Klasse VT 11.5 (in German). Irsee: Märklin.
