= Goethe (train) =

Express train between France and Germany

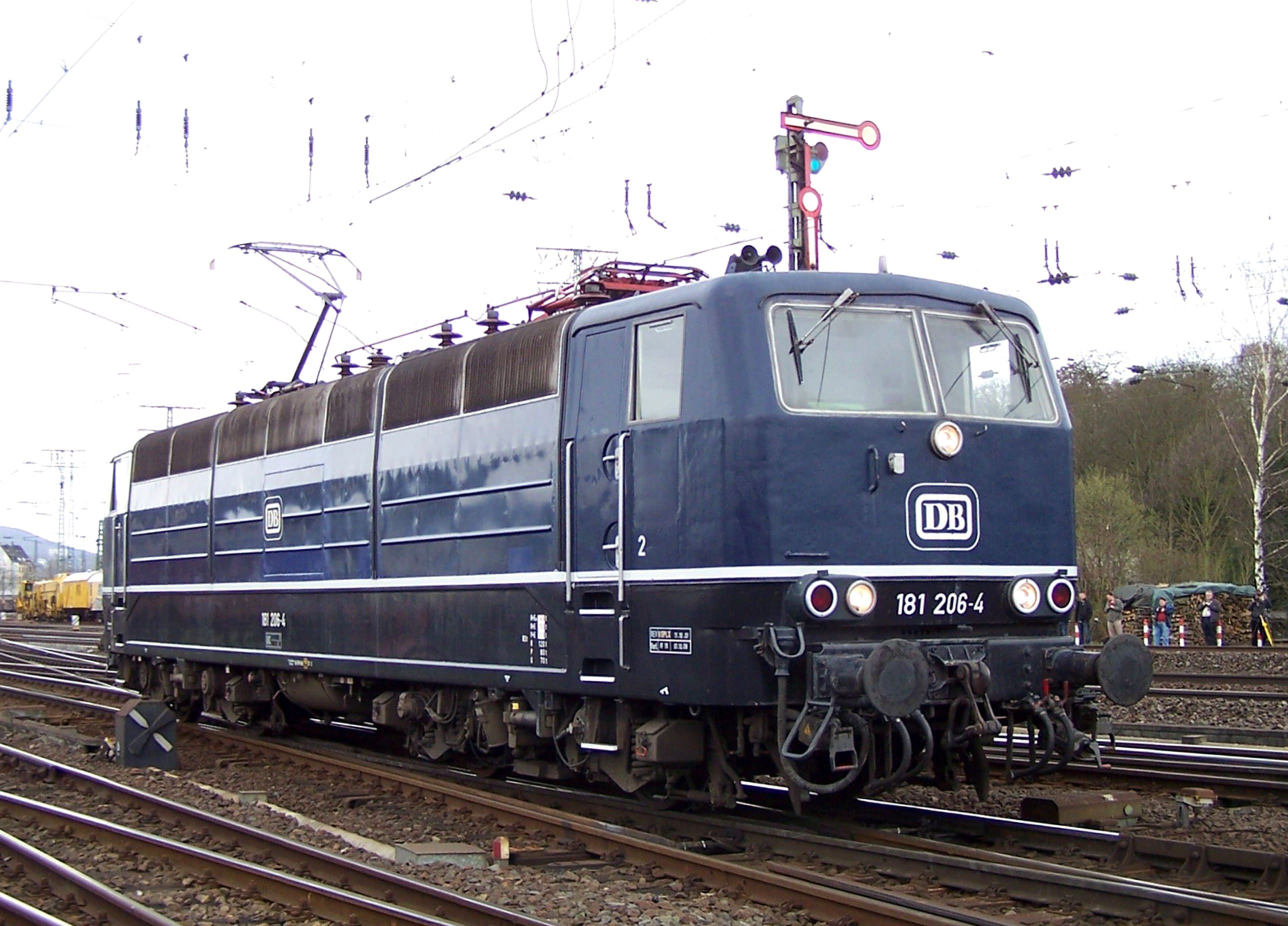
- Class 181, multivoltage locomotive

Overview
- Service type: Trans Europ Express (TEE) (1970–1975 and 1979–1983); InterCity (IC) (1983–1987); EuroCity (EC) (1987–2007)
- Status: Replaced by an ICE3
- Locale: France; Germany
- First service: 31 May 1970
- Last service: 10 June 2007
- Former operators: SNCF; Deutsche Bundesbahn / Deutsche Bahn (DB)

Route
- Termini: Paris-Est/ Dortmund Hbf; Frankfurt Hbf
- Service frequency: Daily

Technical
- Track gauge: 1,435 mm (4 ft 8 1/2 in)
- Electrification: 15 kV AC, 16.7 Hz (Germany)

The Goethe was an express train that, for most of its existence, linked Paris-Est in Paris, France, with Frankfurt Hbf in Frankfurt, Germany. Introduced in 1970, it was operated by the SNCF and the Deutsche Bundesbahn / Deutsche Bahn (DB).

The train was named after the German author and philosopher Johann Wolfgang von Goethe, who lived in Frankfurt.

Initially, the Goethe was a first-class-only Trans Europ Express (TEE). It originally was scheduled to operate westbound in the morning and eastbound in the late afternoon and evening. However, at the start of the summer 1972 timetable period, on 28 May, the schedule was reversed, with the TEE Goethe now scheduled to leave Paris at 8:00 and Frankfurt at 16:15. On 31 May 1975, it was discontinued, replaced by an unnamed two-class express train running on a similar schedule over the same route.

On 27 May 1979, the name Goethe was revived for a different route, between Dortmund Hbf, Germany, and Frankfurt Hbf, again as a TEE. This second TEE Goethe was discontinued on 29 May 1983, reclassified as IC Goethe, a two-class InterCity train. The Goethe name continued in use for this route through 1 June 1985.

During the same period, from 1975, the Paris–Frankfurt express/Schnellzug running on approximately the former Goethe schedule had continued to operate, without name, and was reclassified as an InterCity (IC 156/157) in June 1984. Subsequently, on 2 June 1985, the name Goethe was restored to that train and itinerary. On 31 May 1987, it was included in the then-new EuroCity (EC) network (with train nos. EC 56/57) and from 1997 to 1999 it was extended to Prague It was replaced in June 2007 by an ICE3 service, unnamed and initially requiring a change of train in Saarbrücken.

- When this train was created as TEE, this train was composed only by SNCF material, the Mistral 56 coaches, a SNCF dining car with own electricity with integrated generating set, and Mistral 56 coaches where electricity powered with a red generating van, with powerful generating set( 600 V 3 phase ) source: les Trans Europ Express, Maurice Mertens.

== See also ==
- History of rail transport in France
- History of rail transport in Germany
- List of named passenger trains of Europe
