= History of rail transport in the Czech Republic =

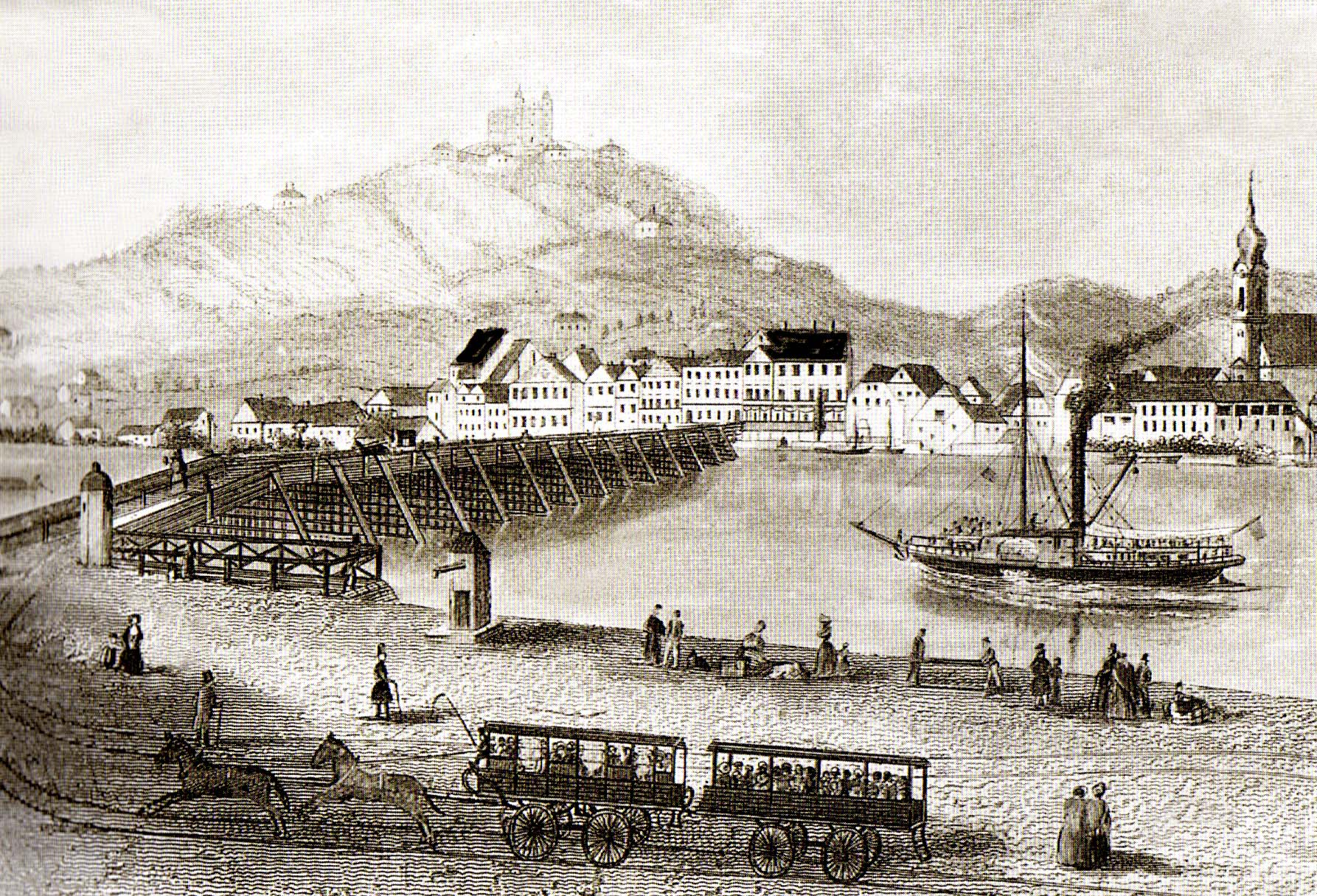
Horse railway bridge between České Budějovice and Linz, Austria

The history of rail transport in the Czech Republic began in the 1820s. Railways were built primarily for the transport of freight. Periods when they were built and operated by commercial operators have alternated with periods of nationalization, public investment or government support. In 2009 the country had 9,420 km (5,850 mi) of standard gauge track, 3,153 km (1,959 mi) of which is electrified.

== See also ==
- History of rail transport
- České dráhy
- History of the Czech lands
- Rail transport in the Czech Republic
- Transport in the Czech Republic
