= Rheingold (train) =

Named train which operated along the Rhine

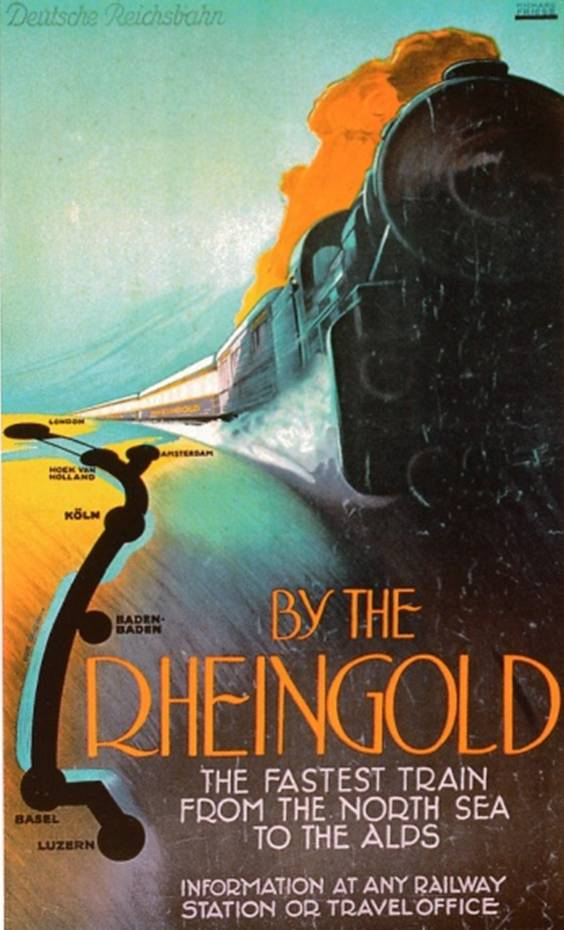

Overview
- Service type: Long-distance express Fernschnellzug (FD) (1928–1939); Fernzug (F) (1951–1965); Trans Europ Express (TEE) (1965–1987)
- Status: Discontinued
- Locale: Netherlands; Germany; Switzerland
- First service: 15 May 1928
- Last service: 30 May 1987
- Successor: EC Rembrandt
- Former operators: NS; DRG / DB; SBB-CFF-FFS

Route
- Termini: Amsterdam CS / Hoek van Holland Haven; Basel SBB / Genève-Cornavin
- Service frequency: Daily

Technical
- Track gauge: 1,435 mm (4 ft 8 1/2 in)
- Electrification: 15 kV AC, 16.7 Hz (Germany / Switzerland) (1962–1987)
Route map
- Map showing the route of the Trans Europ Express (TEE) Rheingold in red, with other colors denoting routes over which first-class TEE Rheingold through coaches were conveyed by other trains.

The Rheingold ('Rhinegold') was a named train that operated between Hook of Holland, near Rotterdam, and Geneva, Switzerland (or Basel before 1965), a distance of 1,067 kilometres (663 mi), until 1987. Another section of the train started in Amsterdam and was coupled to the Hoek cars in Utrecht. The Rheingold ran along the Rhine River via Arnhem, Netherlands, and Cologne, Germany, using special luxury coaches. It was named after Richard Wagner's Das Rheingold opera, which romanticized the Rhine. From 1965 until the train's discontinuation in 1987, the Rheingold was a first-class-only Trans Europ Express (TEE) train.

== Route ==
Geneva (Gare de Cornavin) – Basel SBB – Freiburg – Baden-Baden – Karlsruhe – Mannheim – Mainz – Cologne – Düsseldorf – Duisburg – Utrecht and then in separate trains continuing (still as the Rheingold) to both Hook of Holland and Amsterdam. At Hook of Holland, the train had timed connections for ship service to and from Harwich, England. The Geneva–Basel section was added in 1965 and was discontinued in 1980/82 (see later section for details).

== Pre-World War II ==
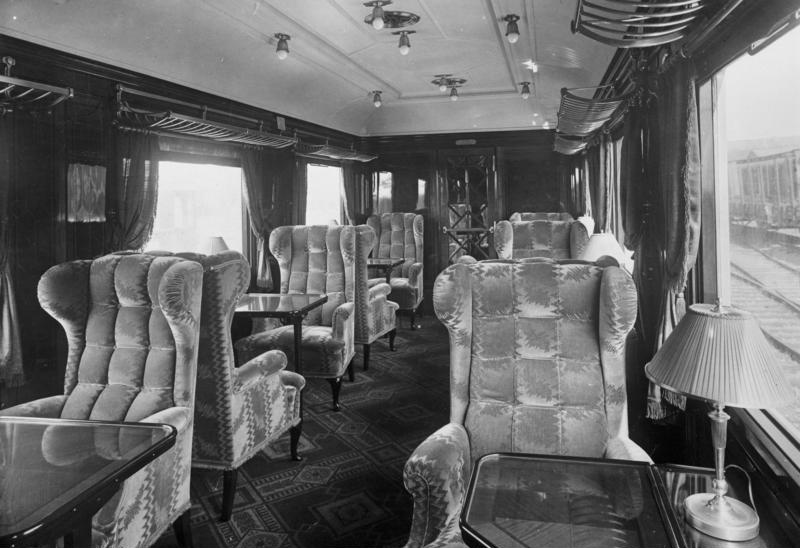
Interior of a first class coach belonging to the Rheingold in September 1930

The first Rheingold, which was classified as a Fernschnellzug (FD) (trains FFD 101 and FFD 102), started service on May 15, 1928. In the Netherlands it was pulled by the NS 3700-3800-3900 steam locomotive series, in Germany by the Baureihen DRG Class 18.3 (Badic IV h, between Mannheim and Basel) and BR 18^{4-5} (Bavarian S 3/6, between Emmerich and Mannheim) and in Switzerland by Ae 4/7 electric locomotives. In 1930, the BR 01 (01 077-181) was used between Mannheim and Basel and permanently from 1935 on, and the NS 3900 in the Netherlands.

The luxurious Pullman-type coaches had a distinct cream/blue livery in 1st and 2nd class, each measuring 23.5 m (77 ft). At both ends (one behind the locomotive) there was a blue luggage wagon. Some cars had a kitchen, with one kitchen serving two cars. Mitropa waiters served the passengers. The cars were the most technically advanced the DRG had at that time, but were less advanced than the later (from 1939) Schürzenwagen (skirted coaches), typical World War II cars. The interiors were designed by artists and architects of the time, and besides being very luxurious were also very spacious. In total, there were 26 coaches and three luggage wagons per train consist. In those days, the trip took 11 hours. At first, the cars had the Deutsche Reichsbahn-Gesellschaft and MITROPA inscriptions with the DRG logo. Around 1931 the name RHEINGOLD was printed on the coaches and the locomotive tender, and the DRG logo remained. In the fall of 1939, due to the start of World War II, the train service was cancelled.

== Post-World War II ==
The service was reestablished in 1951 as the Fernzug (F) Rheingold Express (train numbers F 163/164, later F 9/10 and F 21/22). Most cars survived the war but nevertheless the coaches in Western Germany were painted over and rebuilt to dining coaches (Gesellschaftwagen), long distance coaches (F trains) and short distance train coaches (D trains). The Rheingold now used skirted coaches and was pulled by the Deutsche Bundesbahn steam locomotives BR 01, BR 01.10, BR 03 and BR 03.10 and the BR 41 between Cologne and Kaldenkirchen. In 1954, "Express" was dropped from the train's name.

== TEE Rheingold ==
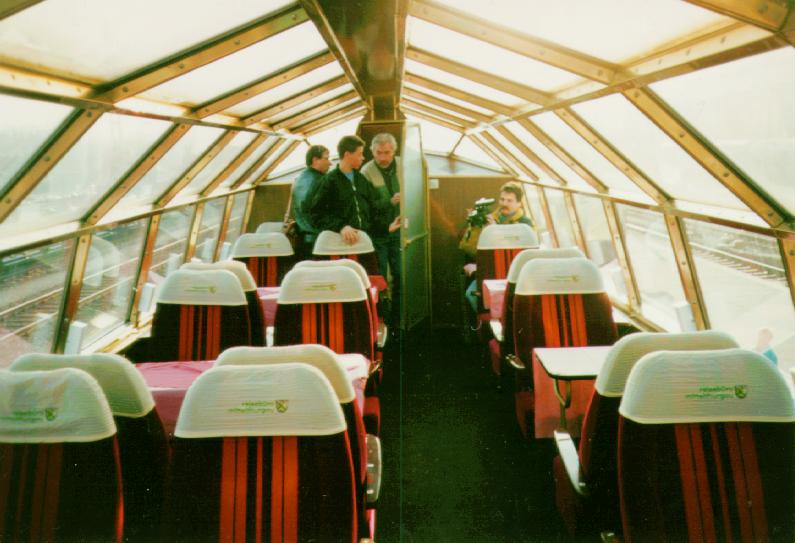
Interior of a preserved ex-Rheingold dome car.

In 1962, the Rheingold became established again as a link between Switzerland and the Netherlands on the pre-war route, and carrying first-class cars only. In 1965, it became a Trans Europ Express (or Trans-Europe Express).

New rolling stock introduced starting in 1962 included dome cars, one per train, used only on the Rheingold and Rheinpfeil (Rhine Arrow). In Europe, the use of dome cars was unique to these two trains. After the Rheinpfeil was integrated into the Bundesbahn's new Intercity network in 1971, the TEE Erasmus began using the displaced dome cars, along with the Rheingold. The dome cars were withdrawn on 30 May 1976.

The new cars, together with improvements to the track along parts of its route in the mid-1960s, made the Rheingold the fastest train in Germany. In 1964, the train was scheduled to cover the 133.9 km (83.2 mi) Freiburg – Karlsruhe section in 59 minutes, working out to an average speed of 136.2 kilometres per hour (84.6 mph), which was the "fastest schedule in German rail history" up to that time.

Until about 1972 the train's all-first-class, red-and-cream cars were pulled by Class E 10.12 electric locomotives painted in blue-and-cream, but later the red-and-cream Class 103 locomotives took over.

== The later years ==
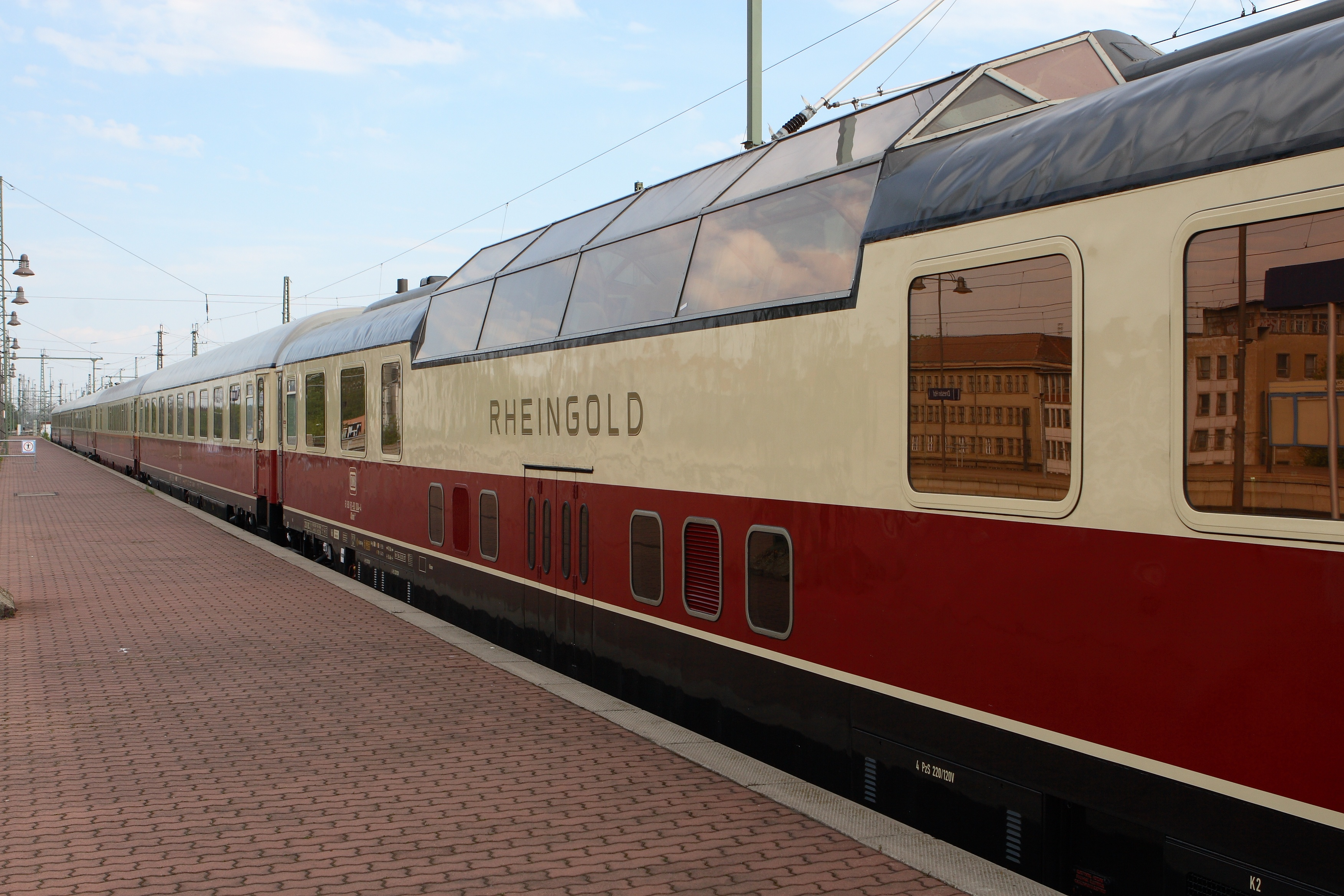
Preserved TEE Rheingold train set, including dome car, during a special excursion in 2007

With effect from the summer timetable in 1979 (on 27 May), the Rheingold ceased carrying any coaches to and from Hook of Holland, with Amsterdam thereafter being the northern terminus for all Rheingold service. The train's Bern–Geneva section was discontinued on 6 April 1980, but was reinstated in autumn 1980 as winter-only service. The Basel–Geneva section was discontinued in 1982. However, during certain times of the year both before 1982 and continuing after, the train carried through coaches to Chur and (until 1985) Milan, which were attached to ordinary express trains south of Basel.

Starting in 1983, the Rheingold had a branch to Munich, which separated at Mannheim from the main train (which continued south to Basel). It provided through TEE service between Amsterdam and Munich, also serving Heidelberg, Stuttgart and Augsburg, among other cities, en route. Until 1985, it operated during the summer timetable periods only (circa late May until late September each year). It was introduced on 29 May 1983 and ran until 24 September of that year. This variant was repeated the following summer and again in summer 1985, and then became year-round. During 1985 and 1986, this branch extended beyond Munich to serve one additional city, terminating in Salzburg, Austria. Although the Mannheim – Munich section became year-round at this time (mid-1985), the new Munich – Salzburg section ran only in summer, operating for the last time on 27 September 1986.

Operation of the Rheingold ended on May 30, 1987, after 59 years and 15 days. The TEE 6/7 was pulled by a BR 103. It was the last train of the TEE-system in Germany.

One set of Rheingold coaches has been preserved by a private company in Switzerland, which are still used to operate steam-hauled excursions.

A complete set of locomotive and blue and cream coaches has been restored by the Freundeskreis Eisenbahn Köln e.V.

== See also ==
- Famous trains
- History of rail transport in Germany
- History of rail transport in the Netherlands
- History of rail transport in Switzerland
- List of named passenger trains of Europe
- Rhinegold (1978 film), 1978 West German drama film directed by Niklaus Schilling, set on the Rheingold train.
