= Rembrandt (disambiguation) =

Rembrandt Harmenszoon van Rijn (1606–1669) was a renowned Dutch painter.

Rembrandt may also refer to:

== Film and television ==
- Rembrandt (1936 film), a film starring Charles Laughton
- Rembrandt (1940 film), a Dutch film made by Gerard Rutten
- Rembrandt (1942 film), a German-language film
- Rembrandt: A Self-Portrait, a 1954 short documentary film
- Rembrandt (1999 film), a film by Charles Matton
- Stealing Rembrandt or Rembrandt, a 2003 Danish film
- Rembrandt, a fictional gang member in the 1979 film The Warriors

== Ships ==
- SS Rembrandt, a 1959-built ocean liner
- S/V Rembrandt van Rĳn, a 1924-built tall ship

== Other uses ==
- Rembrandt (given name)
- Rembrandt (crater), an impact basin on Mercury
- Rembrandt (horse), a dressage horse
- Rembrandt (train), a European train service launched in 1967
- Rembrandt, Iowa, a city in the United States
- The Rembrandts, an American pop-rock band
- Rembrandt Group, a South African tobacco and industrial company
- Rembrandt toothpaste, dental cosmetics line
- Rembrandt, a 1931 novel by Theun de Vries
- Rembrandt, a codename for AMD microprocessors
