= Schnellzug =

Express train in German-speaking countries

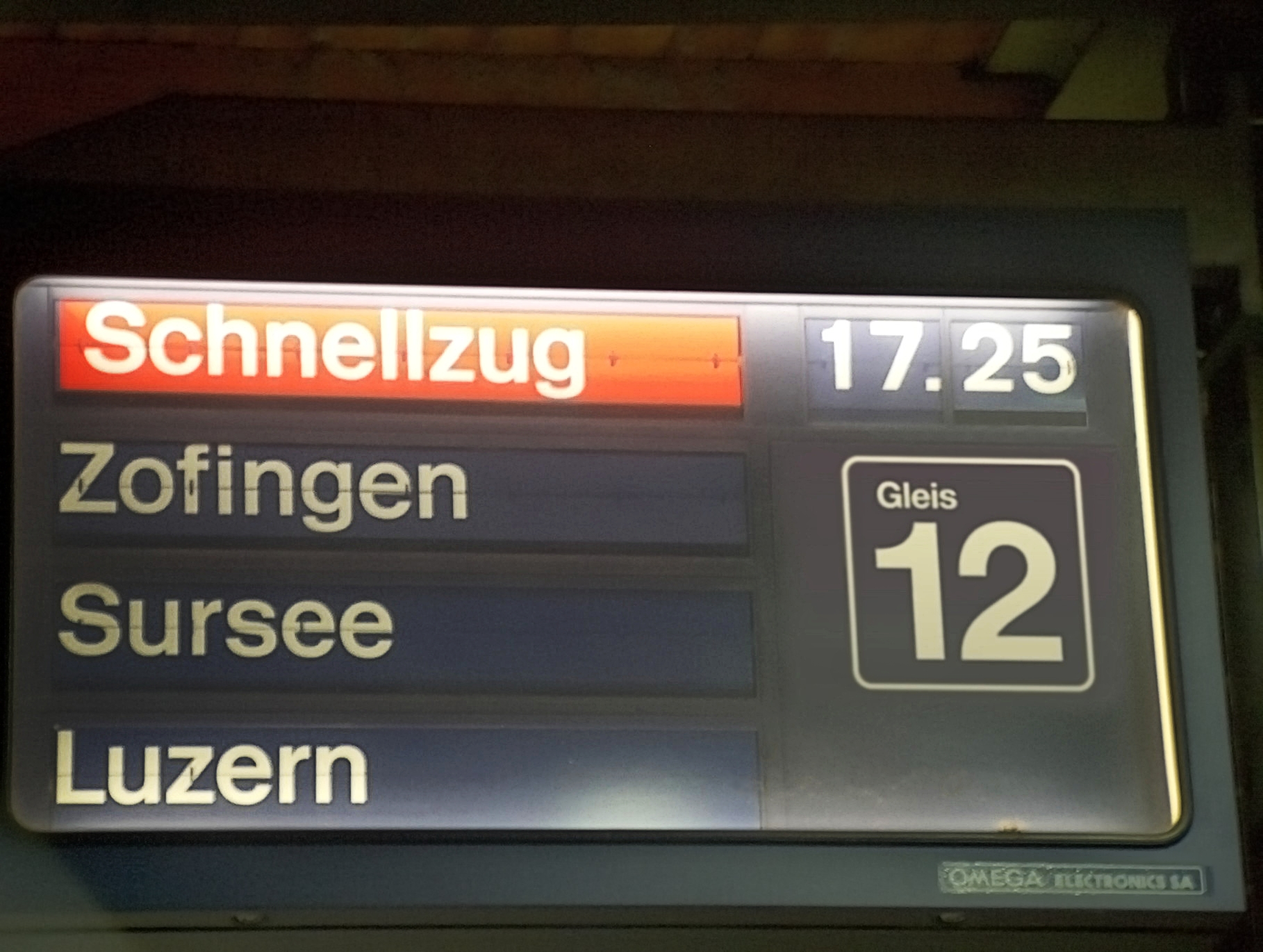
Train destination board for an express train in Olten, pictured in 2004

A Schnellzug is an express train in German-speaking countries. The term is used both generically and also as a specific train type. In Germany and Austria it is also referred to colloquially as a D-Zug, a short form of Durchgangszug ("through train"), and express train services were often given numbers preceded by the letter D. The related term, snälltåg, was used in Sweden officially until January 1980.

On the railway networks operated by the Deutsche Bahn (DB), the Austrian Federal Railway (ÖBB) and the Swiss Federal Railways (SBB) today, express trains are divided into categories such as Eurocity, Intercity, Interregio etc. The DB still occasionally runs D-Zug services in night trains (D-Nacht), especially those to its eastern European neighbours, and as relief trains. Museum services running on DB routes are also given D-Zug numbers. ÖBB runs D-Züge on main routes from/to Vienna on weekends and during rush hours.

== Germany ==
=== The first express trains ===
The first German express train ran on 1 May 1851 between Berlin and Deutz am Rhein (today part of Cologne) and completed the journey in 16 hours. Three months later, on 1 August 1851, the first night train ran from Berlin to Bromberg. The Prussian state demanded a country-wide network of night trains; consequently the various railway companies started up fast courier trains in the years that followed (1852 to 1854), from Berlin to Breslau, Frankfurt am Main, Hamburg and Cologne. Passengers on the night-time courier trains between Berlin and Frankfurt had to pay a higher fare for the first time in order to compensate for the higher crew costs of night-time through trains.

Up to 1889 fast train services were given the letter S for Schnellzug (express train, plural: Schnellzüge ) or K for Kurierzug (courier train). From 1889 all such services in Germany were given the standard letter S.

=== Durchgangszug (D) ===
From 1892 a new train category with especially comfortable express coaches appeared: the Durchgangszug or D-Zug (plural: D-Züge). Originally these were trains in which one could walk right through from end to end by means of bellows-type corridor connectors between coaches and side corridors or centre aisles within coaches, unlike the hitherto usual compartment coaches with doors on each side of the compartment, but no access to the next coach.

The first D-Züge ran on 1 May 1892 on the following routes:

- Berlin Potsdamer Bahnhof–Paderborn Hauptbahnhof–Köln Hauptbahnhof and
- Berlin Potsdamer Bahnhof–Nordhausen–Frankfurt (Main) Hauptbahnhof.

They comprised 1st and 2nd class coaches, dining and sleeping cars (on night trains). They were meant to be not only very comfortable but also particularly punctual. A supplement of 2 marks was payable on D-Zug services. In 1894, the first D-Zug with third class coaches ran between Berlin and East Prussia.

By 1917 almost all Schnellzüge in Germany had been gradually reclassified as D-Züge or converted to supplement-free fast-stopping trains, the so-called Eilzüge. The only standard fare trains which did not stop at all stations were the beschleunigte Personenzüge (BP) or "fast passenger trains". A few Schnellzüge remained in Bavaria where they attracted supplementary fares on the Munich-Mittenwald-Innsbruck line; these did not become D-Züge until 1929.

=== Fernschnellzug (FD) ===
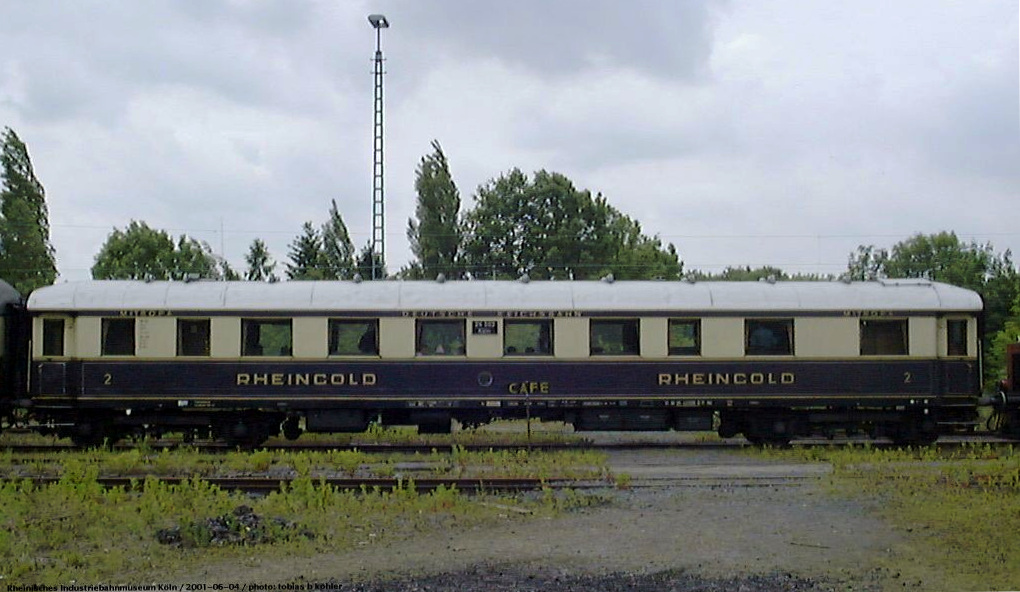
Rheingold coach from 1928

From 1923 very fast trains were grouped into a new Fernschnellzug (FD-Zug) or "long-distance express train" category and only offered 1st and 2nd class accommodation (e. g. FD Rheingold), whilst the majority of D-Züge at that time ran with 1st, 2nd and 3rd class coaches. FD services were withdrawn on 22 August 1939.

From 1933, FD trains were joined by express railcars of the Flying Hamburger type. These trains were classed as FDt or Fernschnellzug mit Triebwagen ("long-distance express train with railcar") and usually offered 2nd class accommodation only. These services ceased on 22 August 1939.

=== Military trains in the Second World War ===
During the Second World War a new train type, the so-called Schnellzug für Fronturlauber ("military express train", literally the "express train for those on leave from the front") or SF-Zug was created. These expresses took the shortest route between the Wehrmacht's operational theatres (including France, Greece and the Soviet Union) and the Deutsche Reich. Some SF-Zug services were open to the general public. This category was the SFR-Zug (Schnellzug für Fronturlauber mit Reisezugteil or "military express with passenger section").

Because there were not enough SF-Zug services to meet the Wehrmacht's transportation requirements, numerous express trains were modified into DmW-Züge or Schnellzüge mit Wehrmachtsteil (express trains with military sections), in which the Wehrmacht reserved several coaches for its own use.

On 23 January 1945 all express train services in Germany were suspended. Only international trains from Berlin to Copenhagen and Prague continued to run until April 1945.

=== After the Second World War ===
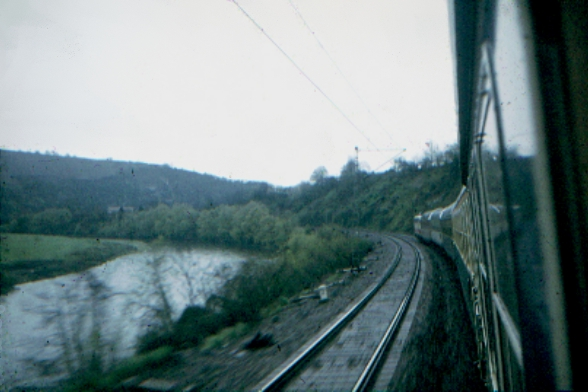
A D-Zug from Saarbrücken–Düsseldorf on the Saar railway at Mettlach

On 22 September 1945 the first express trains to run after the end of the war worked in the US zone between Frankfurt am Main and Munich.

As early as 1952 the Deutsche Bundesbahn procured D-Zug coaches of the later UIC type X. Coaches of similar design were ordered by the ÖBB in 1957 and the SBB in 1969.

On 1 January 1968 the Deutsche Bundesbahn abolished the supplementary fare for D-Zug services for journeys over 80 kilometres and, from 1979, for journeys over 50 kilometres.

The demand for D-Zug links steadily reduced from 1979. In the 1982 summer timetable the supplement was abolished on most of the DB's D-Zug routes.

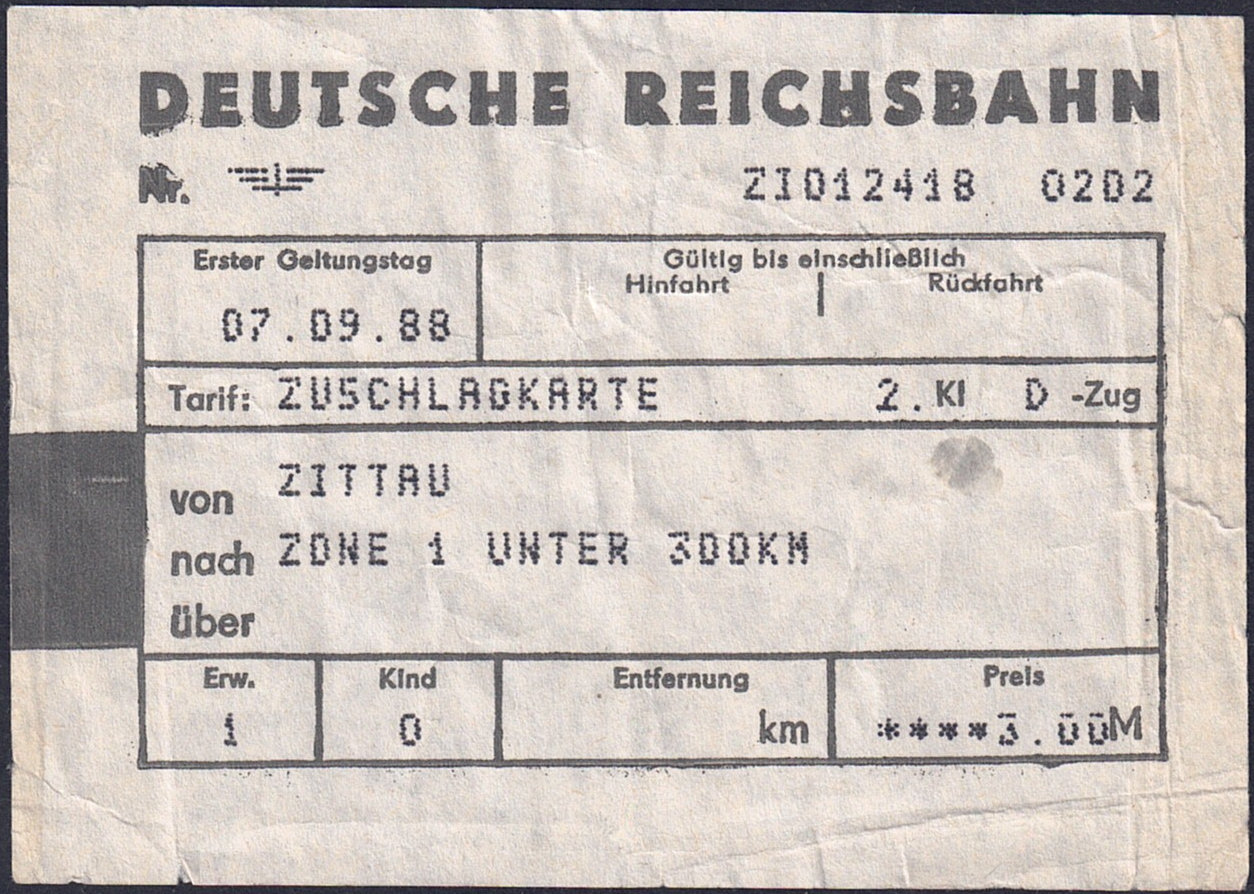
Supplementary fare ticket of Deutsche Reichsbahn

Within the Deutsche Reichsbahn in East Germany, the Schnellzug remained the primary long-distance service. A two-tier supplementary fare (Zone I up to 300 kilometres - 3 marks, Zone II over 300 - 5 marks) was retained until the inception of the 1991 summer timetable.

Until the 1980s, the majority of express trains on domestic routes in East Germany comprised eight-wheeled Rekowagen ("reconstructed coaches"), reinforced by 1st class Modernisierungswagen ("modernised coaches"). Modernisierungswagen and Y coaches were mainly employed in high-grade and international services. Not until the delivery of centre-door (Mitteleinstieg) and Halberstädter express coaches were the, by now obsolete, Rekowagen cascaded to less important duties.

=== Fernzug (F) ===
For the 1951 summer timetable the DB introduced a new class of train: the Fernzug ("long-distance train"). These trains linked the economic centres of the German Federal Republic with one another. The trains were initially given the "old" FD designation and, on 22 May 1955, F for Fernzug and operated until 1956 with 1st and 2nd class coaches; and thereafter exclusively with the (new) 1st class. The trains always included a dining car or coach with a buffet section that was managed by the DSG.

To begin with, on the Rhine railway, some trains were combined in up to four sets and operated using pre-war VT 04 and VT 06 and the new post-war VT 08 diesel multiple units. As well as DMUs, locomotive-hauled trains of 3 to 5 pre-war coaches were also used. These were steel-bodied, standard coaches (Einheitswagen) of various types. The interiors of the compartments and corridors of these coaches were refurbished and given new carpets. The external livery was changed from the standard bottle green to steel blue (RAL 5011). In addition the words Deutsche Bundesbahn or, if the coaches were only used on domestic routes, the initials DB were mounted on the sides in silver letters. In all at least 76 coaches were converted for this role. They included the coaches from the Henschel-Wegmann train.

With the delivery of new coaches of the later UIC Type X, the pre-war coaches were superseded in Fernzug service. The blue F-Zug livery was adopted later as the paint scheme for the new 1st class coaches.

For these very fast trains which stopped at just a few stations – as in FD times – a special Fernschnellzug supplement was payable. The Fernzüge were replaced in 1971 by Intercity trains.

The famous TEE Rheingold which ran from Amsterdam to Geneva and the Rheinpfeil (Dortmund to Munich) were both initially classed as F-Zug services between 1962 and 1965, before they were upgraded to the TEE category.

=== City-D-Zug (DC) ===
The City-D-Zug (DC) was introduced by the Deutsche Bundesbahn in its 1973 summer timetable. These trains were supposed to connect three times a day to the economic centres linked by the IC network, as feeder trains to that railway system. However the concept was not a success because they were timetabled to meet the two-hourly IC trains that only had 1st class services, leaving 2nd class passengers hanging around for their connexions.

In addition, the coaching stock of DC-Züge was no better than the general standard for normal express trains. An initiative to develop special luxury coaches specifically for the DC-Zug was dropped in favour of the Eurofima project with its standard, high-comfort coaches (Eurofima-Wagen) for six European countries. In 1978 the DB axed this train category. Many trains continued to run on as normal D-Züge, several of them being integrated into the Interregio network 10–15 years later (e.g. the Emden–Münster–Hagen–Gießen–Frankfurt/Main service).

=== FernExpress (FD) ===
The FernExpress was a train type with 1st and 2nd class passenger classes and the historic abbreviation FD, which was introduced by the DB for its 1983 summer timetable. These trains, which had individual names, mainly linked the Hamburg area or the Ruhrgebiet with holiday resorts in southern Germany. Some also travelled abroad.

The 2nd class coaches in these trains all comprised former non-airconditioned IC compartment coaches of the Bm type, that became available when they were replaced in Intercity services by the new air-conditioned open coaches. The all 1st class coaches were also taken from the IC fleet, the restaurant cars comprised QuickPick buffet cars, later also the half-buffet cars, type ARmz^{218}. They were joined in most cases by second class through coaches to other holiday destinations.

The FD train, Königssee, between Hamburg and Berchtesgaden also included a so-called Kinderland-Wagen ("children's world coach") that had a large children's play area. The Allgäu between Dortmund and Oberstdorf and the Berchtesgadener Land between Dortmund and Berchtesgaden also incorporated such coaches later on.

The demise of FD-Züge came in the early 1990s as more and more IR, IC and ICE trains served the holiday regions.

FD-Züge in summer 1983:

- 210/211 Wörthersee: Klagenfurt–Dortmund
- 220/221 Donau-Kurier: Wien–Dortmund
- 264/265 Mozart: Wien–München–Straßburg–Paris Est
- 702/703 Bodensee: Konstanz-Dortmund
- 712/713 Allgäu: Oberstdorf–Dortmund
- 722/723 Berchtesgadener Land: Berchtesgaden–Dortmund
- 780/781 Königssee: Berchtesgaden–Hamburg

FD-Züge in summer 1988:

- 1902/1903 Bodensee: Konstanz-Dortmund
- 1912/1913 Allgäu: Oberstdorf-Dortmund
- 1916/1917 Tegernsee: Tegernsee-Dortmund
- 1920/1921 Bayerischer Wald: Passau-Dortmund
- 1922/1923 Berchtesgadener Land: Berchtesgaden-Dortmund
- 1970/1971 Schwarzwald: Seebrugg-Hamburg
- 1980/1981 Königssee: Berchtesgaden-Hamburg
- 1982/1983 Alpenland: Oberstdorf-Hamburg

=== Expresszug (Ex) ===
The East German Deutsche Reichsbahn has had the train category Ex (Expresszüge) since the 1950s. These were express trains with few stops, similar to the DB's F-Zug services, but offering both 1st and 2nd class. An Expresszug supplement was payable in addition to the Schnellzug fare. After it had disappeared during the 1960s in domestic services, it was re-introduced in the 1969/70 timetable with the arrival of the DR Class VT 18.16 express DMUs.

Ex-Züge in the DR in 1972:

- 2/3: Leipzig-Berlin
- 6/7: Leipzig-Berlin
- 54/55 Vindobona: Vienna-Berlin
- 121/122 Berlinaren: Berlin-Malmö (not available for domestic services)
- 147/148 Karlex: Karlovy Vary-Berlin
- 154/155 Hungaria: Budapest-Berlin
- 311/312 Neptun: Berlin-Copenhagen (not available for domestic services)
- 347/348 Karola: Karlovy Vary-Leipzig (only in summer)

The international trains were converted in the years that followed to normal D-Züge again.

The most famous representatives of the Expresszug category were the Städteexpress trains introduced in 1976. In 1987 the new category Interexpress (IEx) emerged for international service, to which normal D-Zug fares applied.

== Austria ==
The first Austrian express train (Schnellzug) ran in 1857 from Vienna to Trieste. In Austria they emerged later than in Germany, because the railway companies shied away from their higher running costs. In 1861 the first express train ran from Vienna to Budapest, in 1862 express services began on the Vienna to Dresden line via Prague and in 1868 the first express ran from Vienna via Krakau and Lemberg to Bucharest. In 1887 3rd class coaches appeared in express trains for the first time, whilst the Hungarian expresses were made up exclusively of 1st and 2nd class accommodation until 1912.

Later, in addition to the usual Schnellzug, the Expresszug (Ex) category was introduced along with ÖBB Class 4010 express multiple units (Triebwagenschnellzug orTS). These have been replaced in recent years by the new Eurocity and Intercity train types. In night services, most Schnellzüge have become EuroNight trains.

== Switzerland ==
In Switzerland the Schnellzug train category was not entirely dropped from the SBB network until the timetable change on 12 December 2004, when it was replaced by the terms RegioExpress and InterRegio which can be used in all its official languages. One year later the Rhaetian Railway (RhB) followed suit. This process had started a long time before, when the Schnellzug category began to be replaced initially by the InterCity type, some of which have become InterCity-Neigezug (ICN) or Intercity tilting trains of the SBB RABDe 500 class.

== Italy ==
Until its demise on 9 June 2007 the Diretto in Italy was one of the most important categories, filling the gap between local and long-distance traffic. The Diretto had the role of travelling directly from A to B, but served medium-sized stations (unlike the InterCity). The Diretto can be compared to the Austrian Regionalexpress (REX) services.

In former years there was also the Rapido long-distance, supplementary fare service, which only stopped at important stations. This type of train was later replaced by the Intercity.

== The express train today ==
Occasionally the D-Zug category is still used today for day trips with special trains. In the bulk of railway services in Germany, Austria and Switzerland it only exists as a successor to the Schnellzug in the form of trains like the ICE, the Intercity and the Interregio trains (whose original designation during the planning phase was XD), the latter having been replaced meanwhile in Germany by Intercity services.

== International ==
The first luxury express train was the Orient Express which ran for the first time on 5 June 1883 from Paris to Vienna. It was followed on 9 May 1896 by the Nord Express from Paris to Saint Petersburg. These expresses only had first class accommodation, and could only be used on payment of a high supplement. They were therefore only within the reach of a small group of customers.

=== Special variations ===
Within Germany, apart from the DB the Cologne-Bonn Railways ran Schnellzüge on its network until 1975. These trains achieved journey times between Cologne and Bonn that were comparable to those of the DB. A D-Zug supplement was payable on these trains.

=== Night trains ===
The DB still occasionally runs D-Züge in night services, especially to Germany's eastern European neighbours (D-Nacht). Some of the supposed D-Nacht-Züge comprise only a few through coaches, which are coupled to other night trains. This train category does however have the advantage that they are not bound by the fare regulations of night trains, but are treated as normal long-distance services. As a result, they are used inter alia in southern Germany as a substitute for late IC connexions that are operated by DB Autozug rather than DB Fernverkehr. Many night trains run as D-Nacht services into Germany's eastern European neighbours. One provider of night express trains is CityNightLine. However, CityNightLine was shut down and all night trains ended with the December 2016 schedule change.

== The Schnellzug in arts ==
In 2017, the German industrial metal band Eisbrecher, on the album Sturmfahrt, released a song called D-Zug. The train goes "always straight ahead, not left, not right" ("immer geradeaus, kein links, kein rechts").

== See also ==
- Train categories in Europe
- Trans Europ Express
- Eurocity
- Intercity-Express
- Intercity
- Interregio
- Regioexpress
- Henschel-Wegmann train

== Sources ==
- Wilfried Biedenkopf: Die Zeit der leichten F-Züge (1951–1971). In: Jahrbuch für Eisenbahngeschichte 33 (2001), S. 5 - 16.
- Thomas Frister u. a.: Wagen für Europa. Die Geschichte der 26,4-m-Wagen. In EK-Special 74, EK-Verlag, Freiburg (2004)
- Scharf, Hans-Wolfgang: Vom Fernschnellzug zum Intercity. EK-Verlag, Freiburg (1983)
- Rico Bogula: Internationale Schnellzüge in der DDR - 1949 bis 1990. EK-Verlag, Freiburg (2007)
