= Rembrandt (train) =

European passenger train (1967–2002)

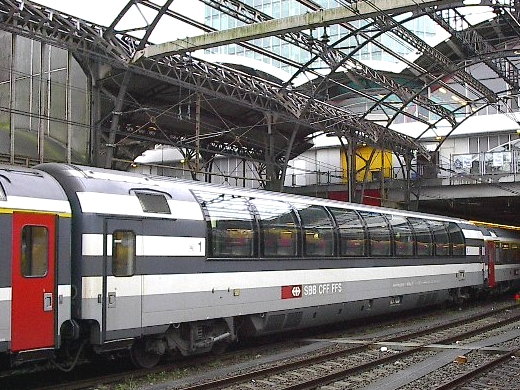
- EC90 panoramic coach (Apm 19) of Swiss Federal Railways in Utrecht

Overview
- Service type: Trans Europ Express (TEE) (1967–1983); InterCity (IC) (1983–1987); EuroCity (EC) (1987–2002)
- Status: Discontinued
- Locale: Netherlands; Germany; Switzerland
- First service: 28 May 1967
- Last service: 14 December 2002
- Successor: ICE, EC Rätia
- Former operators: Deutsche Bundesbahn; Swiss Federal Railways

Route
- Termini: Amsterdam CS; München Hbf. / Chur
- Distance travelled: 887 km / 985 km
- Service frequency: Daily

On-board services
- Catering facilities: Restaurant car
- Observation facilities: from 1991

Technical
- Track gauge: 1,435 mm (4 ft 8 1/2 in)
- Electrification: 1500 V DC (Netherlands); 15 kV 16,7 Hz (Germany) & (Switzerland)

The Rembrandt was an express train that linked Amsterdam in the Netherlands, with Munich in Germany and later Chur in Switzerland. The train was named after the renowned Dutch painter Rembrandt. For its first 16 years it was a first-class-only Trans Europ Express, becoming a two-class InterCity in 1983 and finally a EuroCity in 1987.

== History ==
=== Trans Europ Express ===
With the completion of the electrification works at the Dutch–German border on the Arnhem–Oberhausen line, the Rembrandt was launched on 28 May 1967. Of the then-three TEE services on that line, the Rembrandt was scheduled as the afternoon service from Amsterdam, between the Rheingold in the morning and the Rhein-Main in the evening. The Rembrandt conveyed through coaches for the TEE Helvetia that were exchanged in Mannheim, thus providing an afternoon TEE service between Amsterdam and Zürich via the Rhine Valley, alongside the TEE Edelweiss which departed from Amsterdam in the morning and was routed via Brussels and Luxembourg en route to Zurich. It carried a dining car staffed by the German Sleeper and Dining Car Company (DSG).

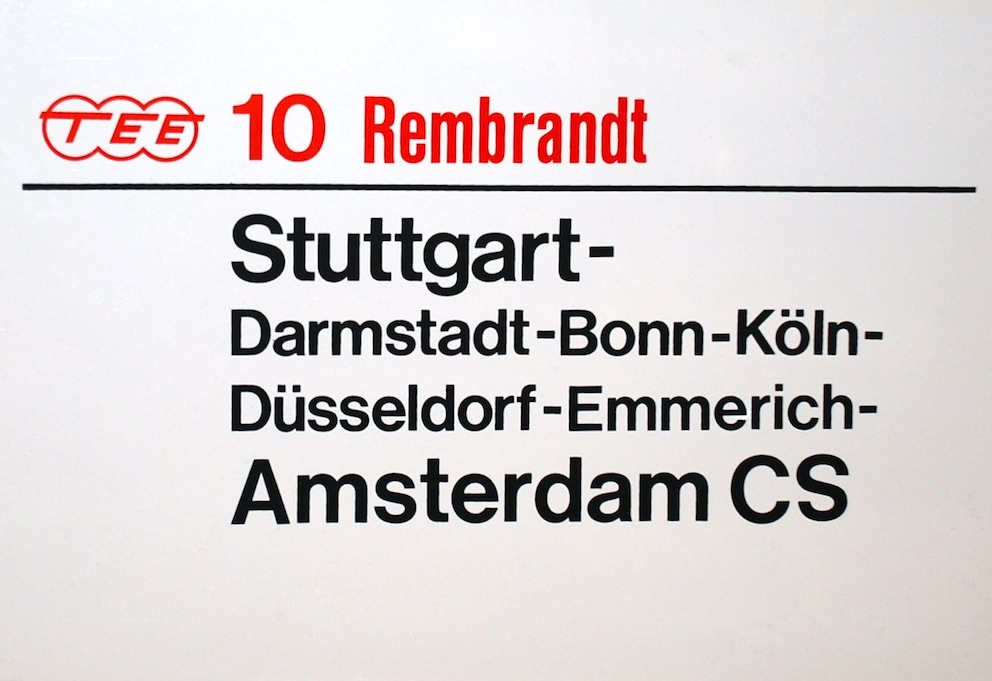
Route placard for the 1980–83 route

The Rembrandt was the first TEE to call in Baden-Wurtemberg's capital, Stuttgart. Northbound, the Rembrandt departed for Amsterdam from Munich early in the morning, thus providing a morning service complementing the existing afternoon TEE service provided by the Rheinpfeil. On 27 May 1979, the exchange of coaches with the Helvetia was discontinued, and the stop at Mannheim was replaced by a stop at Darmstadt. On 1 June 1980, the route was shortened to Stuttgart at the southern end.

The Rembrandt's last day of operation as a TEE was 28 May 1983. The following day, its southern terminus was moved farther north, to Frankfurt am Main, and the train was converted to a two-class InterCity service. It continued to carry a full dining car. Its train number was IC 122 northbound, IC 123 southbound.

=== EuroCity ===
On 31 May 1987, with the start of the EuroCity network, the EC Rembrandt replaced the TEE Rheingold, although the Swiss terminus was not Geneva but Chur. The original route of the Rembrandt was served by EC Frans Hals. When new Swiss rolling stock of type EC90 became available in 1991, the Rembrandt was formed with class EC90 coaches, including observation cars – or "panoramic" coaches – Swiss class Apm 19. As the Rheingold had carried observation cars from 1962 until 1976, the 1991 change to the Rembrandt's consist returned such cars to the train service through the Rhine Valley, although in a newer form, not the vista-dome type that the Rheingold had carried. On 14 December 2002, the Rembrandt was replaced by an ICE service between Amsterdam and Basel.

== Works cited ==
- Centre for publicrelations UIC (1972). TEE (in Dutch). Paris: Union International des Chemins de Fer.
- Hajt, Jörg (2001). Das grosse TEE Buch (in German). Bonn/Königswinter: Heel Verlag. ISBN 3-89365-948-X.
- Mertens, Maurice; Malaspina, Jean-Pierre (2007). La Légende des Trans Europ Express (in French). Vannes: LR Presse. ISBN 978-29-036514-5-9.
- Goette, Peter (2008). TEE-Züge in Deutschland (in German). Freiburg: EK-Verlag. ISBN 978-3-88255-698-8.
