= Rheinpfeil (disambiguation) =

Rheinpfeil (German - Rhine arrow) may mean:

- The Rheinpfeil (hydrofoil), a Raketa-type hydrofoil boat
- The Rheinpfeil (train), which ran between 1952 and 2002
