= History of rail transport in the Netherlands =

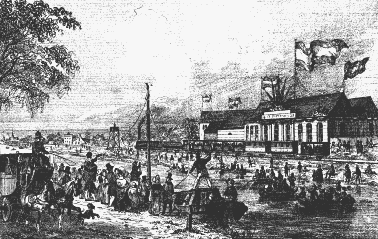
Opening of the first railroad in the Netherlands

The history of rail transport in the Netherlands is generally considered to have begun on September 20, 1839, when the first train, drawn by De Arend, successfully made the 16 km (9.9 mi) trip from Amsterdam to Haarlem. However, the first plan for a railroad in the Netherlands was launched only shortly after the first railroad opened in Britain.

When discussing the history of rail transport in the Netherlands, one can roughly distinguish six eras, namely the period up to 1839, when the first plans were made for a railroad; the period 1840–1860, when the railroads experienced their early expansion; the period 1860–1890, when the government started to order the construction of new lines; the period 1890–1938, when the railroads were consolidated into two large railroads; the period 1938–1992, when the Nederlandse Spoorwegen was granted a monopoly on rail transport; and finally the period from 1992 to the present, when the Nederlandse Spoorwegen lost its monopoly.

== The first line 1839 ==
=== A false start ===
An ambitious army officer, W. A. Bake, launched the first plan to build a railroad in the Netherlands shortly after Britain's first railroad opened. He planned to build a railway connecting Amsterdam to Cologne (Germany), passing through Arnhem. However, unlike most European countries, the Netherlands already had an effective manner of transporting goods and passengers between cities, the horse-drawn boat or trekschuit. The Netherlands had historically been a trading nation, partly due to the many rivers and canals running through the country which allowed for effective transport. Many people thus questioned the need for a railroad. Moreover, the existing shipping industry formed a powerful lobby against the railroad, which managed to sway public opinion. The result was that when Bake tried to raise funds for the railroad, he failed completely. He was never to return to his plans.

=== Royal intervention ===
An employee of Bake, W. C. Brade, continued his plans, although he changed the route to run from Amsterdam to Rotterdam, with the original stretch running to Haarlem to test its economic viability. This change in route may have been partly influenced by wealthy investors who were eager for a direct train connection between either of the great Dutch ports (Amsterdam and Rotterdam). King William I was reluctant to have the Netherlands at a competitive disadvantage to the neighbouring countries who were all building railroads. He might also have felt threatened by the plans for the Iron Rhine.

=== Building the line ===
With the blessing of the king, construction of the railroad could commence. However, there was one major obstacle, a lack of qualified railroad construction engineers. The experts had to be imported from other countries, mainly England. Even with this expertise, a few odd decisions were made; citing safety concerns, it was decided that the rail would be built on a broad gauge of 1,945 mm (6 ft 4 9/16 in), while the neighbouring countries all used 1,435 mm (4 ft 8 1/2 in) standard gauge. This made the railroad incompatible with those of neighbouring countries, whereas the system was originally intended to link up with them (the railroads would later be converted to standard gauge to remedy this). It also delayed delivery of the locomotives.

=== Opening of the line ===
When the line was finally completed, and the locomotives delivered, the line could be opened. On September 20, 1839, a train pulled by the locomotives De Arend (and De Snelheid as a backup) left Amsterdam, arriving in a (then) recordbreaking 30 minutes later in Haarlem. Commercial transport started four days later.

== Early expansion 1840–1860 ==
After the first stretch of railroad proved to be successful, the railroads started to expand slowly. The bulk of the railroads were constructed by either the Hollandsche IJzeren Spoorweg-Maatschappij (HSM, "Hollands Iron Railway-Company"), who also built the first line, or the Nederlandse Rhijnspoorweg-Maatschappij (NSR, "Netherlands Rhine Railway-Company"), and a few other minor railway companies.

=== Hollandsche IJzeren Spoorweg-Maatschappij ===
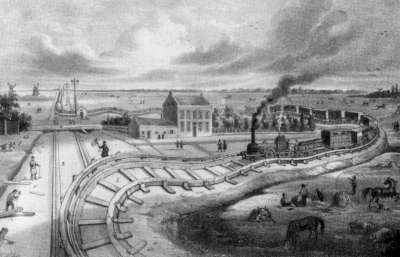
Comical drawing of 'Het laantje van Van der Gaag'

After the first stretch between Amsterdam and Haarlem proved viable, the company decided to complete the line to Rotterdam. Some people, especially the wealthy landowners, weren't too fond of the railway crossing their land, while other people were interested in the economic potential of the railway. This led to a rather famous incident when Aernout Hendrik van Wickevoort Crommelin, the owner of a small parcel of land in Delft which lay directly in the path of the railway, only wanted to sell his land in exchange for a train station at a place favorable to him. The HSM first tried to use legal means to buy the land, but when that took too long, they simply built the railway with a sharp curve around the land. Van Wickevoort, seeing that his plan had failed, then donated the land to the railway. This small change in the route had only been operational for five days, but cost the railroad more than they would have spent fulfilling Van Wickevoorts' demands. This incident is referred to as 'Het laantje van Van der Gaag'.

Without further major incidents, the line was completed in 1847 when it reached Rotterdam (the Rotterdam Delftsche Poort railway station, which was located to the east of the current location of the Rotterdam Centraal railway station).

=== Nederlandsche Rhijnspoorweg-Maatschappij ===
The only other major railway which was founded in this period was the Nederlandsche Rhijnspoorweg-Maatschappij (NRS). The first line the NRS wanted to build ran from Amsterdam to Utrecht, Arnhem, and then on into Germany. They however only launched their plan shortly after the HSM had started constructing their first line, and could only find a few investors (mainly German). King William once again proved to be the saviour of the railway, when he personally vouched for the interest payments on the financing of the railroad. Once the funding was secured, the line could be completed. Like the HSM, the NRS made the odd decision to build the railway using a Dutch broad gauge of 1,945 mm (6 ft 4 9/16 in), while the connection in Germany was on 1,435 mm (4 ft 8 1/2 in) standard gauge. The first stretch connecting Amsterdam to Utrecht opened on December 18, 1843, and the stretch to Arnhem was opened on May 16, 1845. The final stretch, the connection with Germany, was only completed 11 years later, in 1856, possibly because the railway first had to convert to standard gauge. The NRS also undertook the construction of the line from Rotterdam to Utrecht, thus connecting Rotterdam to Germany.

A few other minor railway companies started operation in this period, such as the Aachen-Maastricht Spoorweg Maatschappij (AM) which built a railway from Aachen to Maastricht (1853) and from Maastricht to Hasselt (1856), completing a connection between Antwerp and Cologne. In 1854 and 1855 the Société Anonyme des chemins de fer d'Anvers à Rotterdam (AR) built a railway from Antwerp to Moerdijk and a branchline from Roosendaal to Breda. From Moerdijk the voyage to Rotterdam was completed by steamferries. By 1860, only 325 km (202 mi) of railway had been constructed, but the real boom in railway construction was about to start.

== Construction boom 1860–1890 ==
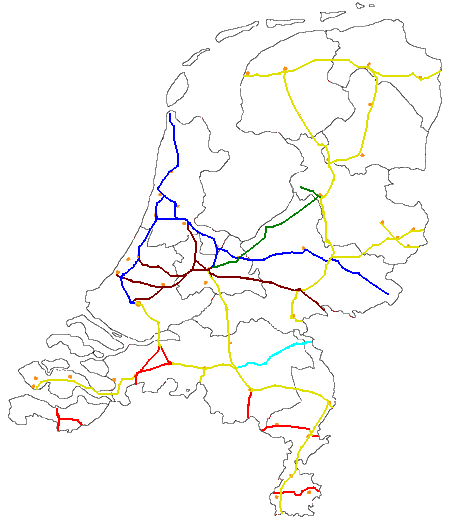
A map of the railway network around 1880, showing the different railroad companies. HSM NRS SS NCS NBDS Other Companies

As in most other countries, the government chose to leave the construction and operation of the railways to private companies. This led to a concentration of the lines in the densely populated North and South Holland Provinces, the Province of Utrecht and to a lesser extent Gelderland, which lies on the route between Holland and Germany. Citizens from various towns and cities not served by the railways feared that their respective city would be put at a disadvantage compared to cities which were connected to the network, so they then started lobbying the government to expand the growing network to include as yet unconnected towns. Others founded their own railroads (Lokaalspoorweg).

=== Government intervention ===
In 1860 the spoorwegwet was approved in which the government stated its intention to build a large rail network. Previously, the government had subsidized certain lines, but never done anything of this scale. The network was designed for efficiency, which meant that as many cities as possible had to be connected with the least amount of track. Another aspect of this efficiency was that, save for a few major stations, all stations along the line were built to a standardised design based on the expected volume of travellers.

The map on the right shows the lines constructed by the government in gold.

=== Maatschappij tot Exploitatie van Staatsspoorwegen ===
To service the new lines built by the government, a new private company was founded, the Maatschappij tot Exploitatie van Staatsspoorwegen, which fittingly translated as Company for the Exploitation of the State Railways. Despite its name, however, this company was not founded by the state, but by a group of private investors who received the concession for the lines built by the state.

=== Private construction ===
While the government took on the job to build the majority of the lines, the private railway companies continued to build their own new lines. For example, the HSM built a line connecting Amsterdam to Germany to compete with the NRS on freight and passengers bound for Germany, while the NRS built a highly anticipated line between Leiden and Woerden, though it proved to be a financial failure.

New companies were also founded. The Noord-Brabantsch-Duitsche Spoorweg-Maatschappij (NBDS) was founded to fill the gap in the line between Saint Petersburg, Berlin and London.

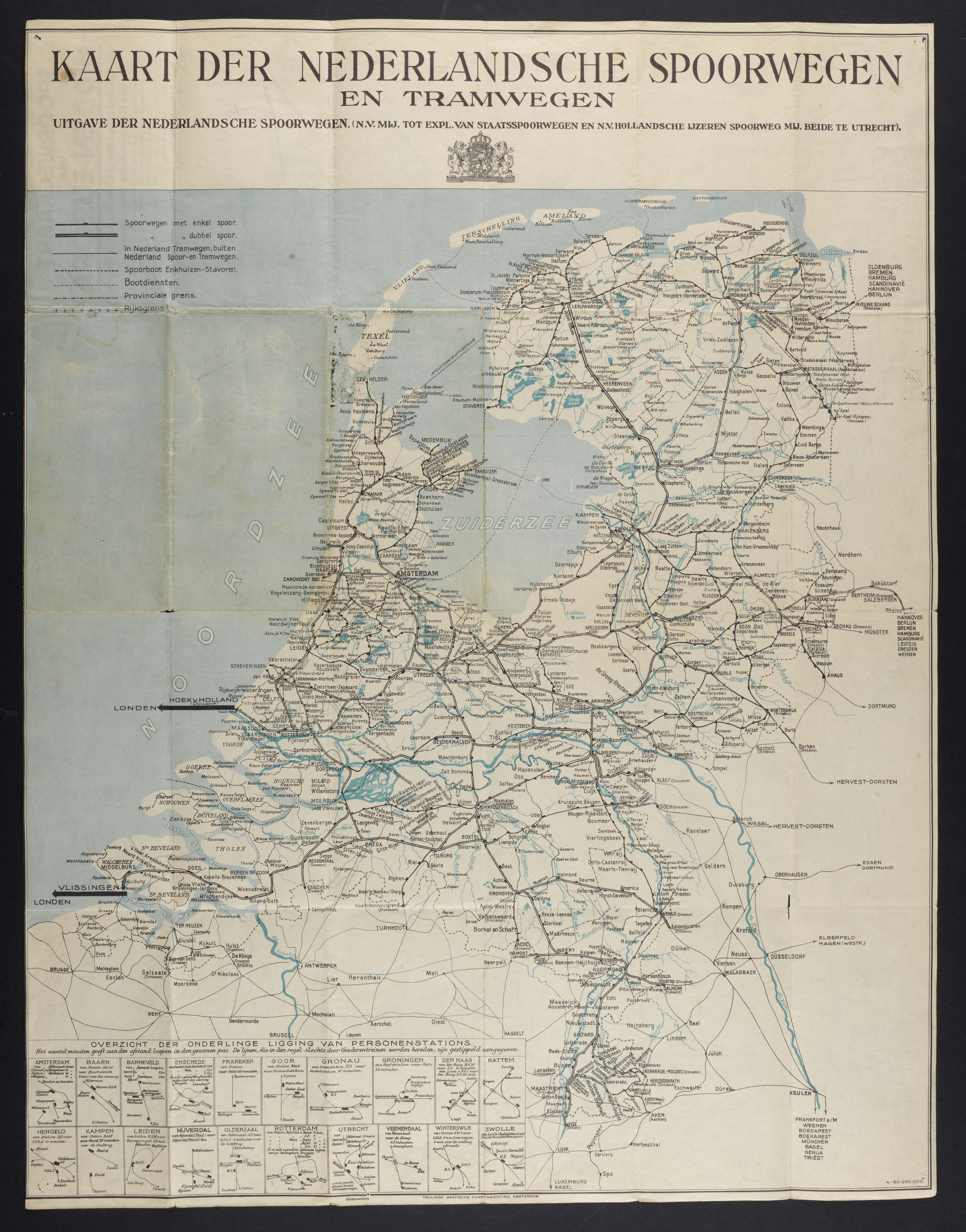
1930 Official railway map

== Consolidation 1890–1938 ==
In the early 1900s, the Noord-Friesche Locaalspoorweg-Maatschappij built two lines in the north of Friesland. The line from Leeuwarden to Ferwerd opened in 1901, being extended to Metslauwier later that year. A line branched off at Stiens, reaching Harlingen by 1904, with a branch to Franeker and another goods-only branch to Berlikum. A final extension of the original line reached Anjum in 1913.

In 1908, the Hofpleinlijn which connected Rotterdam with the Hague and Scheveningen became the first electrified railway in the country. It was served by alternating voltage of 10,000 V. The overhead line was chosen over the third rail system to decrease the number of accidents. In 1927, the line between Rotterdam and Amsterdam was electrified. Eventually, all lines were changed to the 1500 V DC standard.

== Nederlandse Spoorwegen 1938–1992 ==
See the article about the Nederlandse Spoorwegen until this section is completed

== See also ==
- History of rail transport
- History of the Netherlands
- Narrow-gauge railways in the Netherlands
- Nederlandse Spoorwegen
- Rail transport by country
- Rail transport in the Netherlands
- Railway Museum (Netherlands)
