= Mitropa =

German railway catering company

MITROPA AG
- Logo since 1949
- Company type: Aktiengesellschaft; GmbH (from late 2004)
- Industry: Public transport industry, catering
- Founded: 1916
- Defunct: 2006
- Fate: Merged into the Selective Service Partner subsidiary
- Successor: SSP Group
- Headquarters: Munich, Germany
- Area served: Central Europe
- Services: Catering, foodservice
- Revenue: €120 million (2003)
- Number of employees: 1,950 (2004)

Mitropa (stylised in all caps) was a catering company best known for having managed sleeping and dining cars of different German railways for most of the 20th century. Founded in 1916, the name "Mitropa" is an abbreviation of Mitteleuropäische Schlafwagen- und Speisewagen-Aktien-Gesellschaft. The railway carriages displayed a distinct burgundy-red livery with the Mitropa logo.

Since a 2002 reorganization, when the onboard catering branch was taken over by DB Fernverkehr, the company only provided stationary food services for rail and road customers. The remaining business was sold to Compass Group in 2004 and merged into the Select Service Partner (SSP) subsidiary in 2006.

== History ==
The company was founded during World War I on 24 November 1916, as Mitteleuropäische Schlafwagen- und Speisewagen-Aktien-Gesellschaft (lit. 'Central European Sleeping and Dining Cars Incorporated'). Its founders included different railway companies of the Central Powers, i.e. Germany and Austria-Hungary, who discontinued the service provided by the 'enemy'-owned Compagnie Internationale des Wagons-Lits (CIWL). From the establishment of business activities on 1 January 1917, Mitropa held the monopoly on cross-border dining and sleeping car services, including the Balkans Express from Berlin to Constantinople, introduced to replace the CIWL Orient Express trains.

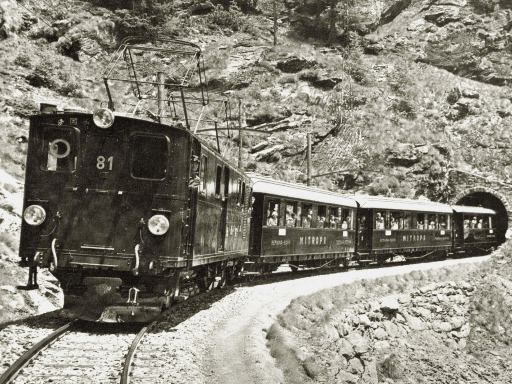
Bernina Express with Mitropa dining cars, 1928

After the war, CIWL was able to take over most routes in Central Europe, while Mitropa maintained most of its routes within Germany and Austria as well as routes to the Netherlands, Scandinavia and Switzerland. From 1928 the company ran diner cars on the Bernina and Rhaetian Railway lines as well as on the pullman coaches of the Rheingold luxury train competing with the CIWL Edelweiss service. Mitropa also catered Donaudampfschiffahrtsgesellschaft passenger ships and the Baltic ferry link from Sassnitz to Trelleborg.

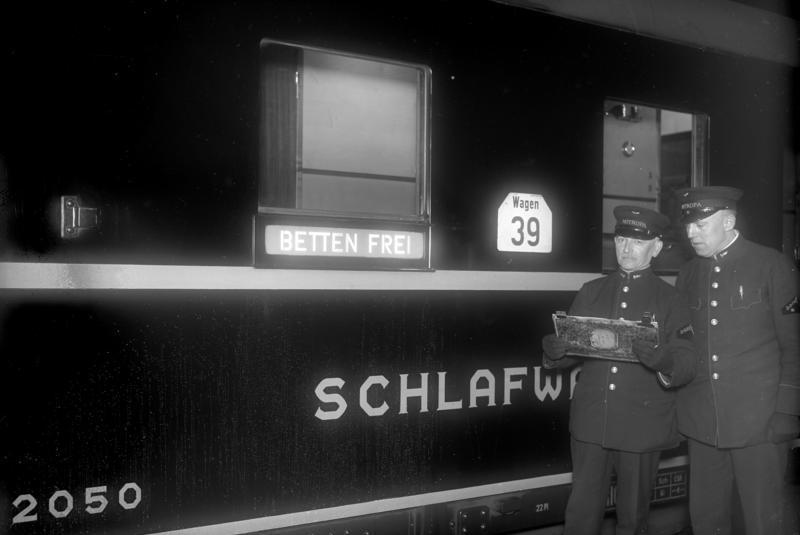
Mitropa sleeper with Betten frei (beds available) sign, 1932

In those times, Mitropa developed its burgundy-red corporate design, with a modern font and the distinctive 'M' logo styled by Karl Schulpig (1884–1948). From 1927, it also sponsored the Mitropa Cup, one of the first international football competitions for club sides. The company prospered between the wars and managed about 750 coaches by 1940, however, it never came close to the size of CIWL.

While from 1933 the corporate management was brought into line in the course of the Nazi Gleichschaltung process, several employees on board were organised in a clandestine trade union movement and made use of their professional activity to smuggle secret messages and material across international borders. In March 1939 the company banned German Jews and Jews without nationality from using dining or sleeping cars. In World War II the company's business was seriously limited, while on the other hand Mitropa temporarily ran former CIWL services in territories controlled by the Wehrmacht, including a restaurant at Warsaw Main Station (Dworzec Główny) in occupied Poland. Dining car services discontinued in 1942 by order of State Secretary Albert Ganzenmüller, the last sleeping car connections were terminated in 1944.

In the Cold War and the Division of Germany, Mitropa became the catering company for the Deutsche Reichsbahn, the national railway of East Germany. The Western section of Mitropa split off and named itself German Sleeper and Dining Car Company (Deutsche Schlafwagen- und Speisewagengesellschaft, DSG) to manage the sleeping and dining coaches on the Deutsche Bundesbahn railway lines in the Federal Republic.

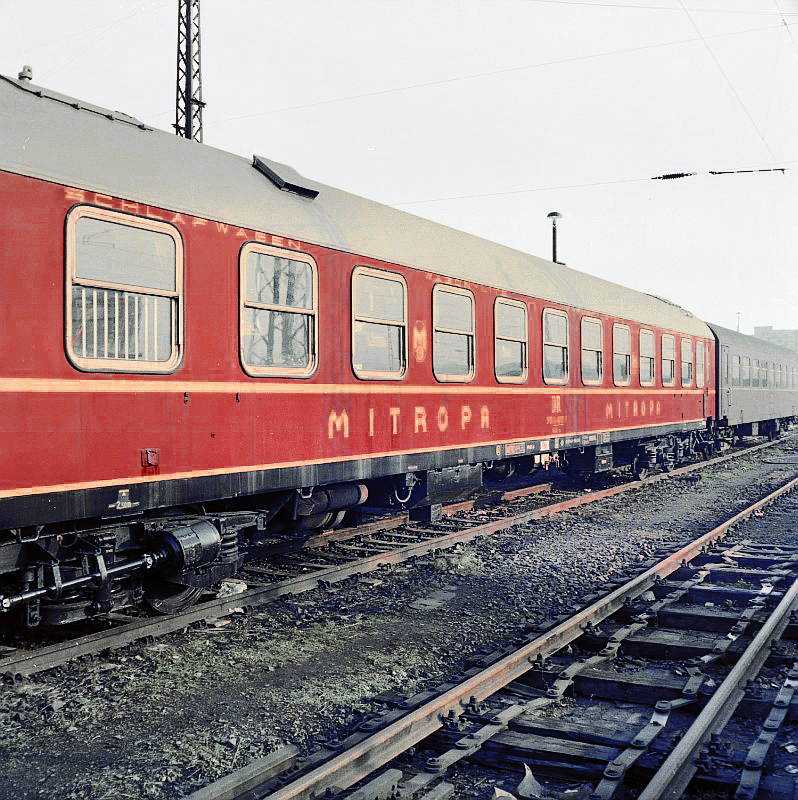
Mitropa sleeper in Dresden, 1972

Based at East Berlin, Mitropa AG was one of the very few stock companies that remained in existence during the Communist era in East Germany. Beside sleepers and dining cars, it ran restaurants at all major stations, on passenger ships, and on Baltic ferries. In 1961 the company took over the East German motorway service areas and opened its first motel in 1971.

After German reunification in October 1990, both Mitropa and DSG continued to operate in their respective areas of Germany until 1 January 1994, when Reichsbahn and Bundesbahn were merged to form Deutsche Bahn AG. Mitropa and DSG were also re-merged under the Mitropa logo. This was one of the very few instances, and the most prominent, in which a West German company was "taken over" by an East German one, as Mitropa was the surviving entity after the merger.

The new Mitropa continued catering to travellers on rail, road, and water and provided services at railway stations. As expenses could not be met, the on board ship business on the Baltic ferries was sold to Scandlines in 1999/2000. On 1 July 2002, the traditional core business of railway catering and sleepers was handed over to DB Reise & Touristik AG, renamed DB Fernverkehr in 2003, a hundred-percent subsidiary of Deutsche Bahn AG. Sleeper-coaches on Deutsche Bahn trains were managed by City Night Line services.

On 1 April 2004 the remainder of Mitropa AG was sold to the German branch of the Compass Group and transformed into a limited liability company (GmbH). It operated food services at railway stations and motorway service. Since 2006, Mitropa has operated under the name SSP Deutschland GmbH.

== Movies ==
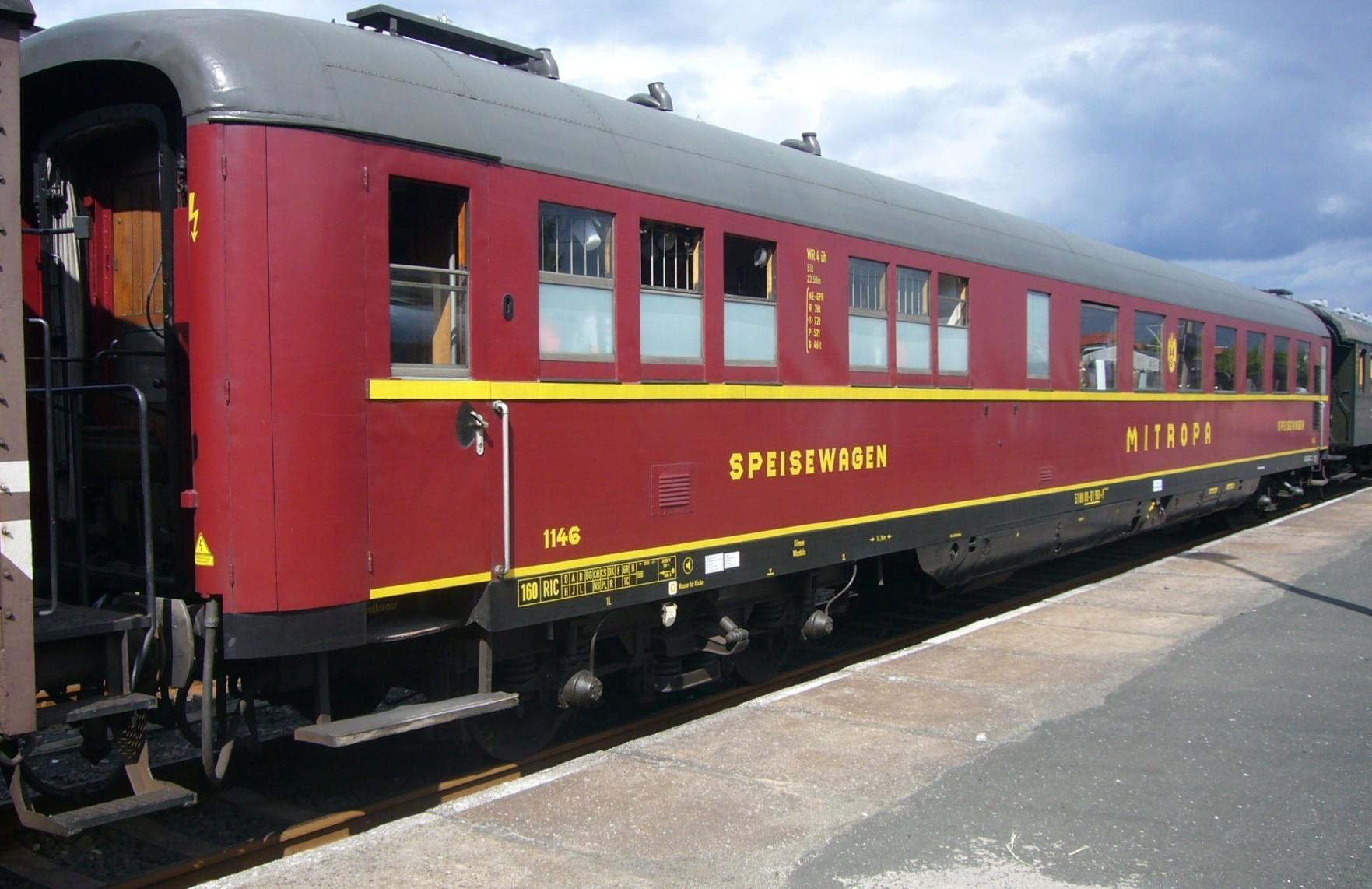
Restored 1939 Wumag Mitropa diner in Sonneberg, 2009

In the movie Enemy at the Gates, Major Erwin König (Ed Harris) is shown in a plush Mitropa dining car en route to Stalingrad when he notices on the opposite track returning Mitropa couchette cars full of wounded soldiers.

The movie Europa by Lars von Trier, set in the American Zone of Occupation in Germany in 1945, involves a company called Zentropa which runs dining and sleeping cars. The company is based on Mitropa, according to the director's commentary on the DVD.

In the movie Goodbye Lenin the lead character, Alex Kerner (Daniel Brühl), instructs his sister's boyfriend Rainer (Alexander Beyer) to lie about his employment as a manager at Burger King and claim that he is a food purchaser for a Mitropa restaurant.

In the seventh episode of the movie Seventeen Moments of Spring, the logos of the company are visible, when the General, Stierlitz's travel companion walks through the railway station.

== Other ==
The opening of a Café Mitropa in West Berlin in 1979, then a popular venue for artists and bohèmiens, met with protest by the East German Mitropa AG who enforced the renaming as Café M.

A "Friends of Mitropa" (Freunde der Mitropa) association for classic dining car restoration was founded on 28 November 1996.

Mitropa model railway coaches have been manufactured by many companies including Märklin, Fleischmann, Trix, and others.
