= Mozart (train) =

Overview
- Service type: F-Zug (1954–1983); FD-Zug (1983–1989); EuroCity (1989–2007)
- Status: Inactive
- Locale: France; Germany; Austria
- First service: 1954
- Last service: 2007
- Successor: TGV, Railjet
- Former operators: SNCF, DB, ÖBB

Route
- Termini: Paris; Vienna
- Average journey time: 13hr 10min
- Service frequency: Daily
- Train number: 64/65

On-board services
- Classes: First and second class
- Catering facilities: Restaurant

Technical
- Track gauge: 1,435 mm (4 ft 8 1/2 in)

Mozart was an express train that linked Paris with Vienna via Strasbourg, Stuttgart and Munich. The service began in 1954, as an F-Zug named Mozart Express running between Strasbourg and Salzburg, before being extended ten years later. In 1983 it was re-classified as an FD-Zug and it was added to the EuroCity network in 1989. It operated until 2007, when it was replaced by a TGV service on the newly opened LGV Est. It was named after the composer Wolfgang Amadeus Mozart, and served many cities with which he had an association.

== Route ==
The eastbound service left Paris Gare de l'Est and traveled the entire length of the Paris-Strasbourg railway, stopping at Nancy along the way. After Strasbourg the train crosses the Rhine, and with it the border into Germany, before joining the Mannheim–Karlsruhe–Basel railway, heading north towards Karlsruhe. After Karlsruhe the train heads west towards Stuttgart - originally it went via Pforzheim, but from 2002 onwards it continued north to Bruchsal where it took a sharp turn south to join the Mannheim–Stuttgart high-speed railway.

Stuttgart Hbf is a terminus, so here the train would change direction, being pulled west over the Geislinger Steige towards Munich, calling at Ulm and Augsburg among other stops. The train changed direction again at Munich, leaving the city pointing west before taking an about turn to join the eastbound Munich–Rosenheim railway. After passing through Rosenheim without stopping, the train would continue east, crossing the border into Austria before stopping at Salzburg, where 2–3 coaches would be detached to serve Graz. From Salzburg it continued along the entire length of the Westbahn, terminating at Vienna Westbahnhof.

== History ==
The service began in 1983 as part of the new Fernschnellzug network (numbered 264/265) and became a EuroCity service in 1989, taking on the train numbers 64 and 65. In December 2002, the service was split in two: EC 64/65 became Paris-Munich only, while the name Mozart was given over to EC 68/69, a Munich-Vienna service. The Paris to Munich train was replaced with a TGV in 2007 after the opening of the LGV Est, while trains 68/69 became a Railjet service in 2009, continuing to Budapest. Neither current service carries a name.

== Rolling stock ==
For most of its life, the train was made up of ÖBB Eurofima coaching stock, occasionally supplemented by coaches from DB and SNCF. It was usually around 11 coaches long, with a restaurant car. The train would undergo many locomotive changes during its journey: an SNCF BB 15000 was the usual motive power for the section in France, while a DB Class 181 multi-voltage loco would bring it over the French-German border. Between Karlsruhe or Stuttgart and Munich it was hauled by a DB 103, or later a 101, and east of Munich power was provided by an Austrian loco, either a Class 1044, or later a Taurus. The Paris–Munich service from 2002 was made up of DB Intercity coaching stock.
