= Hendrik Adriaan van Beuningen =

Dutch businessman and politician

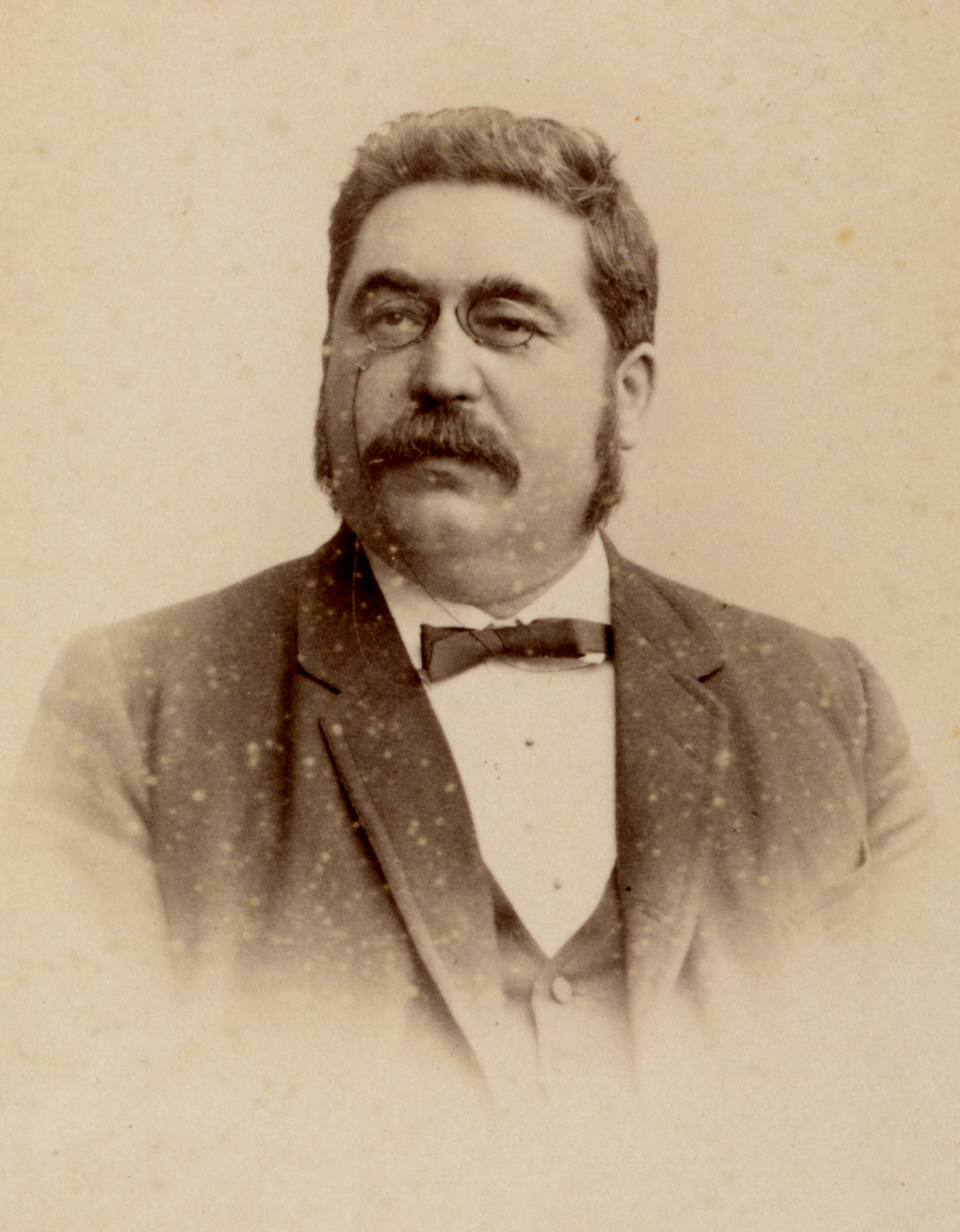
- Born: June 18, 1841; Rossum, Netherlands
- Died: February 7, 1908 (aged 66); Utrecht, Netherlands

Hendrik Adriaan (Hein) van Beuningen (18 June 1841, Rossum – 7 February 1908, Utrecht) was a Dutch businessman and politician.

Van Beuningen was the son of Willem van Beuningen, a Protestant pastor and Adriana Maria Boonen. In 1858 he started working as a clerk at the Dutch Rhenish Railway. However he was promoted within a few years and soon became their freight transport manager.

Van Beuningen became politically active in 1878; first as a municipal councillor in Utrecht, and later as a member of the States of Utrecht. He continued to play these two roles until his death in 1908.
