= Snelheid (locomotive) =

Snelheid & Hoop
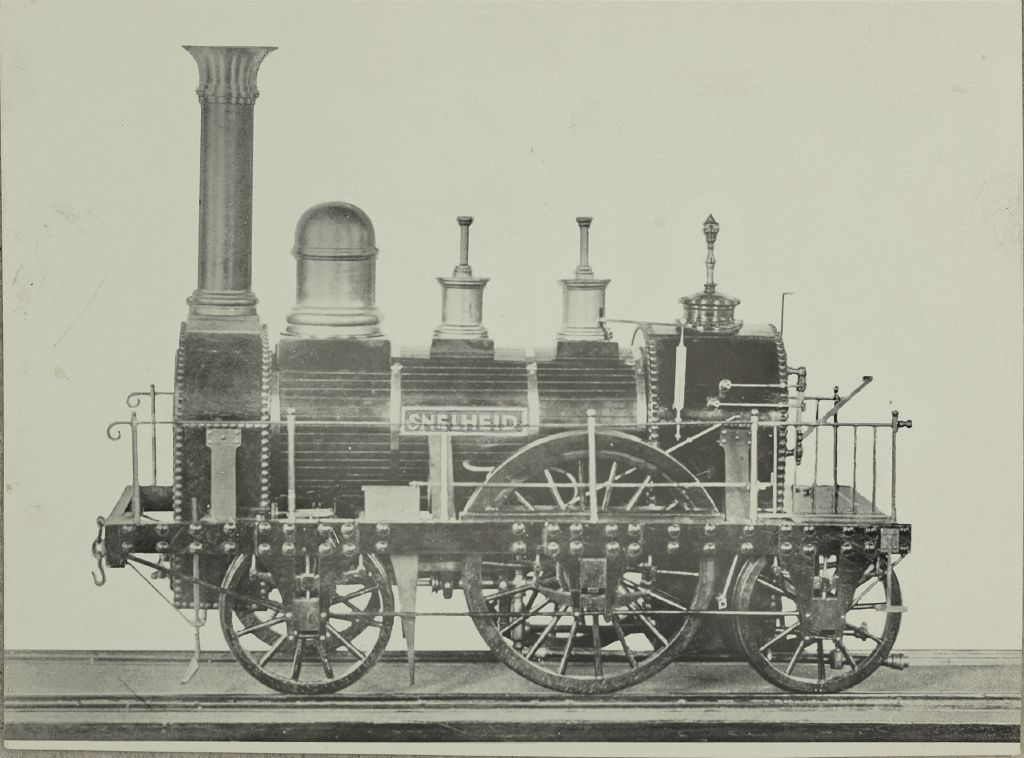
Type and origin
- Power type: Steam
- Builder: R.B. Longridge & Co
- Total produced: 2
Specifications
- Configuration
  - Whyte: 2-2-2
  - UIC: 1'A1
- Gauge: 1,945 mm (6 ft 4 9/16 in)
- Leading dia.: 1,164 mm (3 ft 9.8 in)
- Driver dia.: 1,850 mm (6 ft 1 in)
- Loco weight: 13.5 t 14.9 short tons; 13.3 long tons
- Fuel type: Coke
- Firebox
  - Grate area: 0.91 m^{2} (9.8 sq ft)
- Boiler pressure: 4.05 bar 4.13 kg/cm^{2}; 58.7 psi; 405 kPa
- Heating surface
  - Firebox: 3.91 m^{2} (42.1 sq ft)
  - Tubes: 38.04 m^{2} (409.5 sq ft)
- Cylinders: 2
- Cylinder size: 317 mm × 458 mm 12 31/64 in × 18 1/32 in
Performance figures
- Maximum speed: 40 km/h (25 mph)
- Tractive effort: 6.96 kN (1,560 lbf)
Career
- Operators: HSM

The Snelheid (meaning "Speed" in Dutch) was the name of the first locomotive in the Netherlands, which, together with the De Arend (meaning "Eagle"), pulled the first train between Amsterdam and Haarlem.

Founded in 1837, The Hollandsche Ijzeren Spoorweg-Maatschappij (HSM), (Dutch Iron Railway Company), in July 1838 ordered four Stephenson-type Patentee steam locomotives from R.B. Longridge & Co. of Bedlington, England, to be named Snelheid (Speed), Arend (Eagle), Hoop (Hope), and Leeuw (Lion). The Snelheid and Hoop were similar but deviated from the Arend and Leeuw in several ways. The first of the four, De Snelheid, arrived in the Netherlands in May 1839 and was made roadworthy in July 1839. Initial test runs were made on the line between Amsterdam and Haarlem on August 6, 1839. During a test run on September 18, 1839, running a light engine, the Snelheid lived up to its name by reaching a speed of almost 90 km/h (55.92 mph). In regular service, the maximum speed was limited to 40 km/h (24.85 mph). Once the Arend arrived in Haarlem in early September 1839, train service could commence. After the opening runs on September 20 and 21, 1839, regular service began on September 24, 1839. On October 20, 1839, the sister locomotive Hoop was delivered.

The Snelheid and Hoop served on the entire broad gauge section of the HSM, which was extended to Leiden in 1842 and to The Hague in 1843, to reach Rotterdam in 1847. In 1848, the De Hoop locomotive's condition was found to be so bad that it was suggested to use it as a source of parts for the Snelheid. Due to bad experiences with the locomotive in Leiden and cancellation of two identical locomotives, no replacement locomotive would be available to transport the Hoop. It was decided to overhaul the four oldest locomotives completely. The Snelheid was the first to be overhauled in 1848, followed by the Hoop in 1849. Shortly before its overhaul, however, the Hoop firebox exploded at the Amsterdam station on July 5, 1849.

After the Nederlandsche Rhijnspoorweg-Maatschappij (NRS) (Dutch Rhine Railway Company) track was converted from broad gauge to standard gauge in 1854 and 1855, the HSM tried to replace its oldest locomotives by taking over several of NRS's redundant younger broad gauge locomotives. However, the NRS already had given them to the trader B.J. Nijkerk in Amsterdam. T →he HSM agreed with the dealer to exchange twelve locomotives with an additional payment of 2,000 guilders (US $820, approximately US $26,330 in 2021) per locomotive. In 1856, the Snelheid and Hoop were exchanged for the younger ex-NSR locomotives 4 Pegasus and 5 Hercules. The Pegasus was immediately rejected and returned to the contractor. The Hercules served with the HSM until 1856, when it was seriously damaged in a railway accident near Schiedam on August 10, after which it also was returned to the contractor. All locomotives mentioned were subsequently scrapped.

Factory number	Name	Entered service	Withdrawn	Remarks
116	Snelheid	1839	1856	Traded for NRS 4 Pegasus.
122	Hoop	1839	1856	Traded for NRS 5 Hercules.

== Trivia ==
- The Snelheid was delivered with the name plates "Snelhied", but new name plates with the correct name were soon delivered.

== Sources ==
- H. Waldorp: Onze Nederlandse stoomlocomotieven in woord en beeld. Uitg. De Alk, Alkmaar, 1981. ISBN 90-6013-909-7.
- J. van der Meer: De Hollandsche IJzeren Spoorweg-Maatschappij. Uitg. Uquilair, 2009, ISBN 978-90-71513-68-8.
- G.F. van Reeuwijk: De breedspoorlokomotieven van de H.IJ.S.M.. Uitg. De Alk, Alkmaar, 1985, ISBN 90-6013-927-5.
- J.J. Karskens: De Locomotieven van de Hollandsche IJzeren Spoorweg Maatschappij. Uitg. J.H. Gottmer, Haarlem - Antwerpen, 1947.
