= Erasmus (train) =

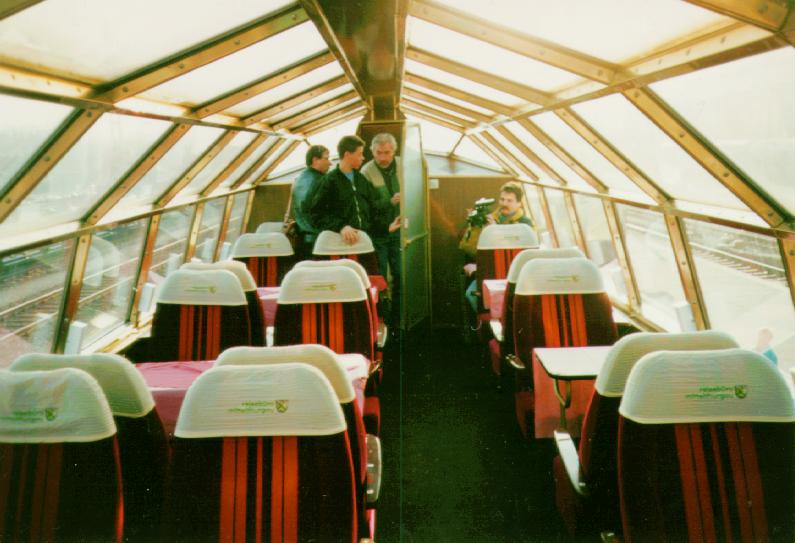
- Vista-dome car (ADm), interior

Overview
- Service type: Trans Europ Express (TEE) (1973–1980); InterCity (IC) (1980–1987); EuroCity (EC) (1987–2000)
- Status: Discontinued
- Locale: Netherlands; Germany; Austria
- First service: 3 June 1973
- Last service: 2 November 2000
- Successor: ICE
- Former operator(s): Deutsche Bundesbahn

Route
- Termini: The Hague; München
- Distance travelled: 915 km
- Service frequency: Daily

On-board services
- Observation facilities: ADm vista-dome

Technical
- Track gauge: 1,435 mm (4 ft 8 1/2 in)
- Electrification: 1500 V DC (Netherlands); 15 kV 16,7 Hz (Germany & Austria)

The Erasmus was an express train that linked The Hague, the Dutch seat of government, with Munich in Germany. The train was named for the Dutch Renaissance humanist Desiderius Erasmus.

== Trans Europ Express ==
The Erasmus was launched on 3 June 1973 on request of the Nederlandse Spoorwegen in order to provide a direct TEE service between The Hague and Germany. The Deutsche Bundesbahn wanted to have an extra TEE service linking Cologne and Munich, using the same intinary as the former TEE Rheinpfeil. Although the Rheinpfeil was relabeled from TEE to IC already in 1971, a time-consuming exchange of coaches, including vista-dome cars, with the TEE Rheingold in Duisburg was upheld until May 1973. The new TEE Erasmus was scheduled to have timed connections with the TEE Prinz Eugen in both directions in Würzburg. From 1973 on there were no exchanges of coaches in Duisburg any more between Rheingold and Rheinpfeil (the Rheinpfeil even was rerouted to Basel instead of Munich in 1979). However, the maintenance of the vista-dome cars (class ADm) had to take place in the DB-works in Münich, which was not on the Rheingold's route at that time. In order to include the regular maintenance in the normal operation, the Erasmus was allocated vista-dome cars as well. The formations of TEE Rheingold and TEE Erasmus changed places, Hook of Holland and The Hague, during the night so every vista-dome car could be serviced in Münich every 5 days. Initially, the service started in The Hague HS (Hollands Spoor) on the Amsterdam–Rotterdam railway, using a connection track to the Hague–Utrecht–Germany railway to go eastbound. In Germany, the train was running via Cologne, Mainz Hbf, Frankfurt Hbf and Wurzburg Hbf to Munich.

On 30 May 1976, the vista-dome cars were withdrawn from service in all trains and replaced by class ARD (bar/business) coaches. From the same date, after the completion of The Hague Central Station, the western terminus of the Hague–Utrecht–Germany railway, the Erasmus's western terminus was changed to Central station instead of Holland Station, thus abandoning the connection track. The train's route was also changed on its southern section, between Mainz and Munich, to run Mannheim Hbf – Stuttgart Hbf – Augsburg Hbf. However, from 27 May 1979, the train reverted to serving Frankfurt but was curtailed to terminate, the section to Munich being largely discontinued. The only remnant of the latter was that, on Fridays only, the northbound Erasmus started in Nuremberg (and this followed the pre-1976 routing, via Wurzburg), which lasted until its discontinuation as a Trans Europ Express. Also on 27 May 1979, the train's Dutch terminus was changed to Amsterdam instead of The Hague.

The Erasmus's last day as a TEE was 31 May 1980. On the following day it became a two-class InterCity train, extended to Innsbruck.

== Two-class train ==
In June 1980, the Erasmus was converted to InterCity class, and thereby began carrying second-class coaches in addition to first-class ones, and at its southern end it was re-extended to Munich and beyond, to terminate at Innsbruck, in Austria.

The Erasmus continued as InterCity service until 30 May 1987. On 31 May 1987, the Erasmus became part of the initial EuroCity services. On 2 June 1991, the route was shortened to Amsterdam – Cologne and eventually replaced by ICE services on 3 November 2000.

== Works cited ==
- Hajt, Jörg (2001). Das grosse TEE Buch (in German). Bonn/Königswinter: Heel Verlag. ISBN 3-89365-948-X.
- Mertens, Maurice; Malaspina, Jean-Pierre (2007). La Légende des Trans Europ Express (in French). Vannes: LR Presse. ISBN 978-29-036514-5-9.
- Goette, Peter (2008). TEE-Züge in Deutschland (in German). Freiburg: EK-Verlag. ISBN 978-3-88255-698-8.
