= Nederlandsche Rhijnspoorweg-Maatschappij =

Nederlandsche Rhijnspoorweg-Maatschappij (NRS)
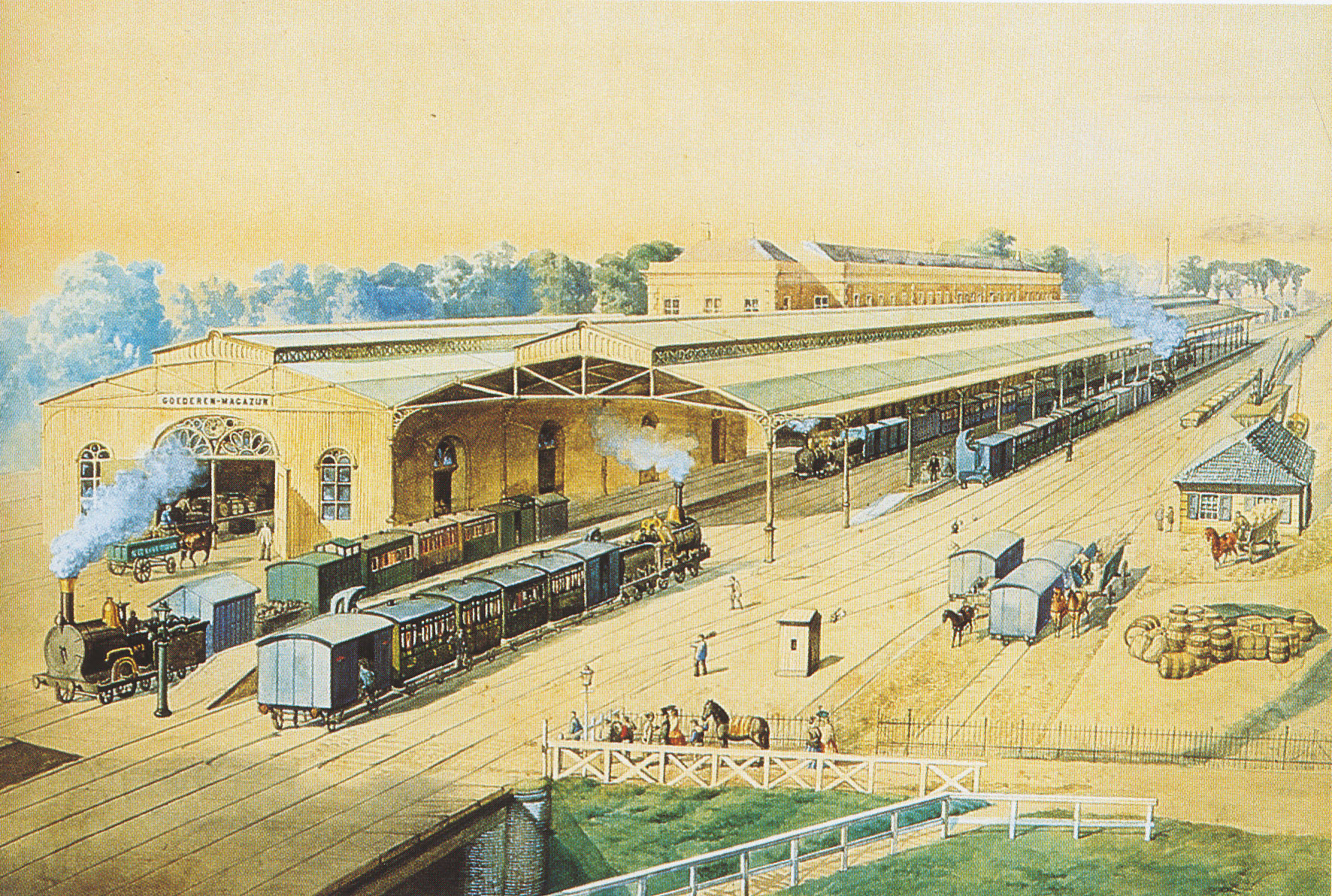
- Platform of the Nederlandsche Rhijnspoorweg-Maatschappij in Utrecht in 1866, later Utrecht CS

Overview
- Headquarters: Utrecht
- Locale: The Netherlands
- Dates of operation: 1845–1890

Technical
- Track gauge: 1,435 mm (4 ft 8 1/2 in) standard gauge
- Previous gauge: 1,945 mm (6 ft 4 9/16 in)
- Length: 118 km (73 mi) constructed, 240 km (150 mi) operated

The Dutch Rhenish Railway or Dutch–Rhenish Railway (Dutch: 'Nederlandsche Rhijnspoorweg' or Nederlandsche Rhijn-Spoorweg) was a Dutch railway company active from 1845 until 1890.

== History ==
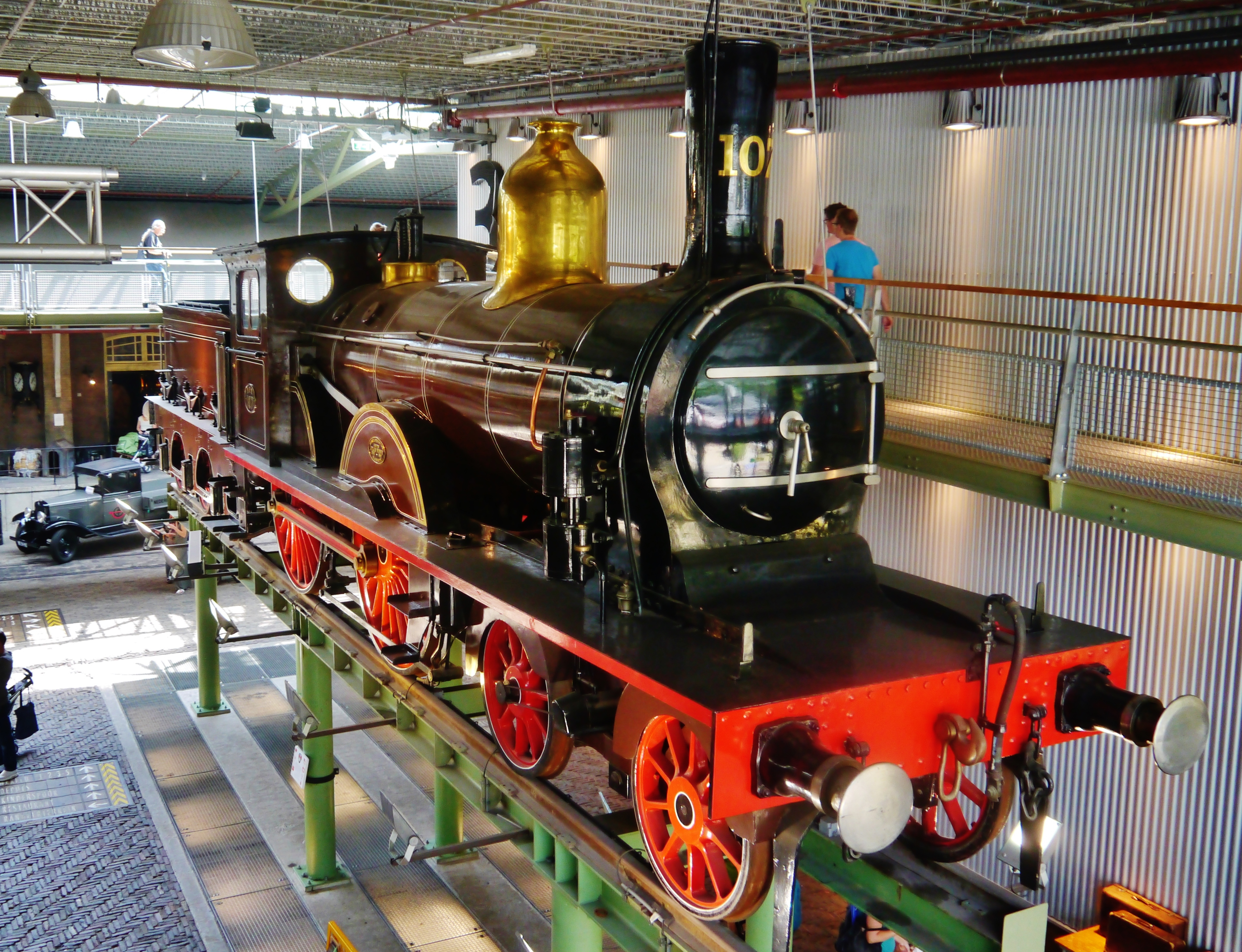
107 in the interior area of the Utrecht Railway Museum

The Dutch Rhenish Railway Company Limited was founded in Amsterdam on 3 July 1845 to take over the state-run Rhenish Railway, which was losing money. The majority of the shareholders were British. In or shortly after 1857, James Staats Forbes was appointed general manager for five years. He remained a permanent adviser to the company until its concession expired and it was nationalised in 1890. The Dutch businessman and politician Hendrik Adriaan van Beuningen started his career at DRR as a clerk, but was soon promoted to freight transport manager.

Locomotive number 107, Sharp Stewart 3563/1889, is preserved in the Utrecht Railway Museum.

== Lines ==
Lines built and operated by the Dutch Rhenish Railway include:

- The Utrecht – Rotterdam line, opened in 1855
- The extension of the Rhenish Railway to Germany, opened in 1856
- The Zevenaar – Cleves line, opened in 1865
- The Harmelen – Breukelen line, opened in 1869
- The Gouda – The Hague line, opened in 1870.

== See also ==
- Amsterdam–Arnhem railway
- History of rail transport in the Netherlands
