= De Arend (locomotive) =

Early steam locomotive of the Netherlands

Arend and Leeuw
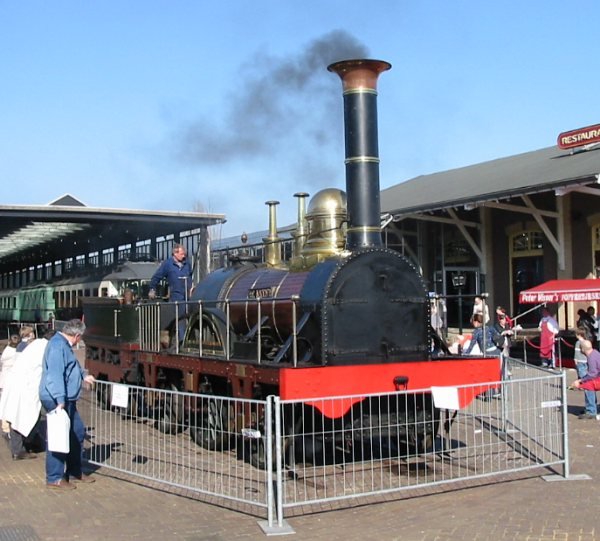
- The 1939-built De Arend replica
Type and origin
- Power type: Steam
- Builder: R. B. Longridge and Company
- Serial number: 119, 125
- Build date: 1839
- Total produced: 2
Specifications
- Configuration
  - Whyte: 2-2-2
  - UIC: 1A1
- Gauge: 1,945 mm (6 ft 4 9/16 in); Dutch broad gauge
- Leading dia.: 1,140 mm (3 ft 8 7/8 in)
- Driver dia.: 1,810 mm (5 ft 11 1/4 in)
- Trailing dia.: 1,140 mm (3 ft 8 7/8 in)
- Tender wheels: 1,060 mm (3 ft 5 3/4 in)
- Length: 9,785 mm (32 ft 1 1/4 in)
- Height: 4,600 mm (15 ft 1 1/8 in)
- Loco weight: 12 tonnes 11.8 long tons; 13.2 short tons
- Fuel type: Coke
- Fuel capacity: 600 kg (1,300 lb)
- Water cap.: 3,300 L 730 imp gal; 870 US gal
- Firebox
  - Grate area: 1.13 m^{2} (12.2 sq ft)
- Boiler pressure: 4.13 kg/cm^{2} 4.05 bar; 0.405 MPa; 58.7 psi
- Cylinders: Two, inside
- Cylinder size: 356 mm × 450 mm 14 1/32 in × 17 23/32 in bore × stroke
Performance figures
- Maximum speed: 30 km/h (19 mph)
Career
- Operators: Hollandsche IJzeren Spoorweg-Maatschappij
- Withdrawn: 1856–57
- Disposition: Both scrapped; replica built in 1939

De Arend (Dutch pronunciation: [də ˈʔaːrənt]; the eagle) was one of the two first steam locomotives in the Netherlands. It was a 2-2-2 Patentee type built in England by R. B. Longridge and Company of Bedlington, Northumberland to run on the then standard Dutch track gauge of 1,945 mm (6 ft 4 9/16 in). On 20 September 1839, together with the Snelheid (Dutch for speed), it hauled the first train of the Hollandsche IJzeren Spoorweg-Maatschappij between Amsterdam and Haarlem. It was withdrawn in 1857.

In 1939 a replica of the De Arend was constructed for the 100th anniversary of the Dutch railways. It is displayed at the Nederlands Spoorwegmuseum (Dutch Railway Museum) in Utrecht.

== History ==
The Hollandsche IJzeren Spoorweg-Maatschappij (HSM), founded in 1837, ordered four locomotives from the R.B. Longridge & Co works at Bedlington in July 1838, of the Stephenson patented Patentee type with the axle layout 1A1, which were named Snelheid, De Arend, Hoop and Leeuw. De Arend and Leeuw were similar to each other, but differed from Snelheid and Hoop in several respects.

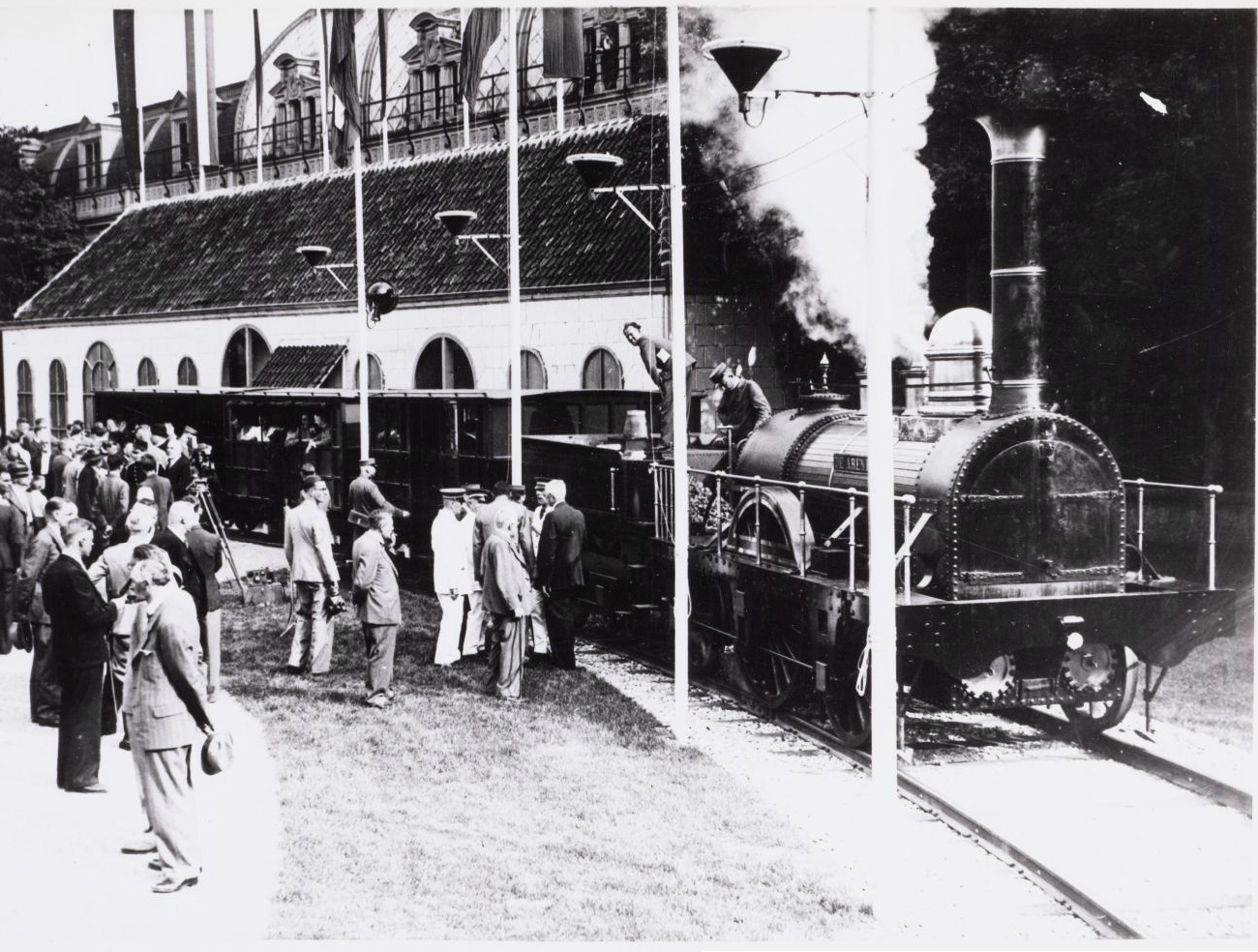
The replica Station d'Eenhonderd Roe at Frederiksplein in Amsterdam with the replica De Arend in 1939.

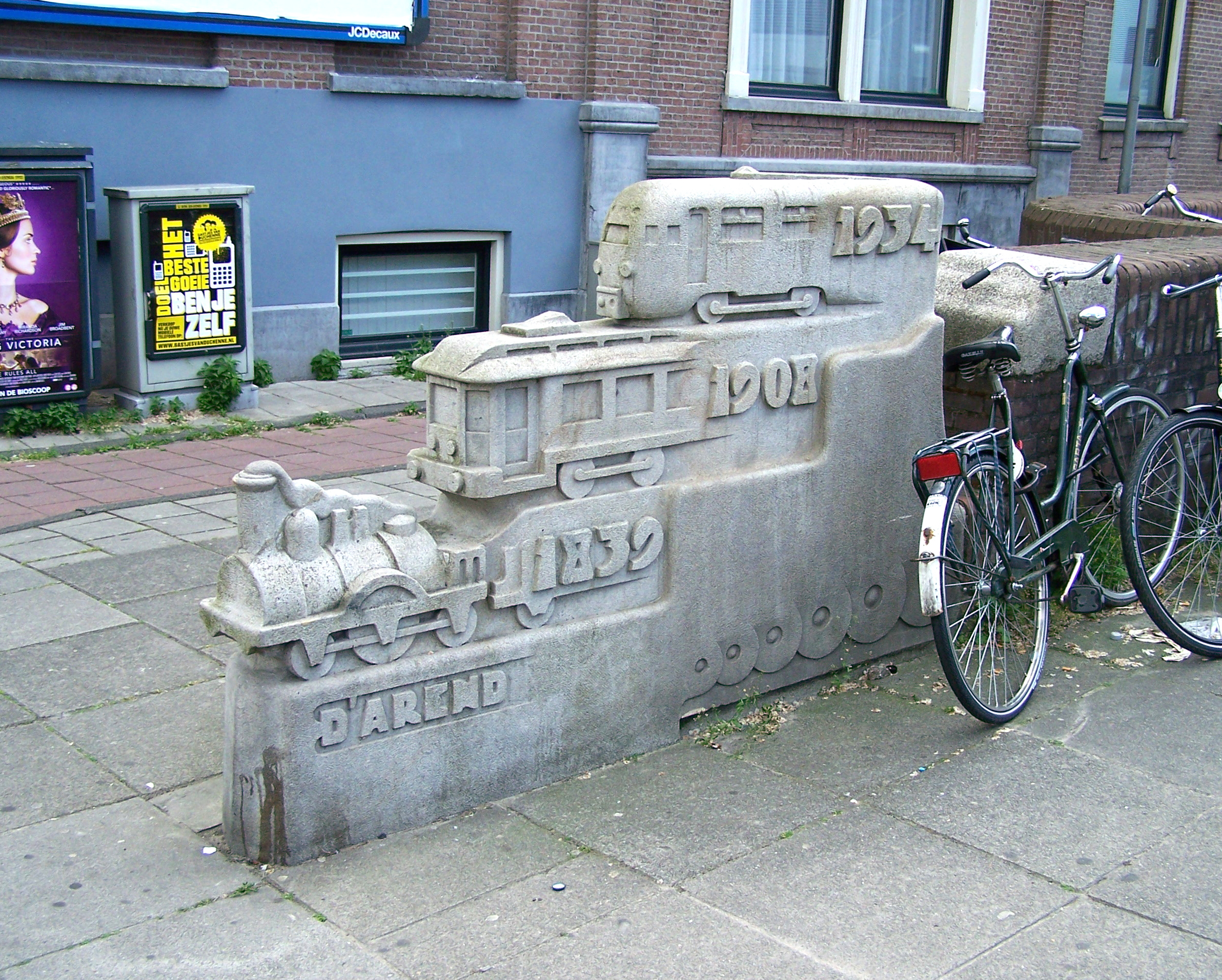
The Development of the Locomotive made by Hildo Krop. A keystone for the Weesperpoortbrug in Amsterdam

.

In May 1839, Snelheid was delivered first, after which the first trial runs were carried. With the delivery of the De Arend in early September 1839, train service could be started. The opening runs took place on 20 and 21 September 1839, with regular service commencing on 24 September 1839. The Lion was delivered as the fourth locomotive on 26 December 1839.

The De Arend and Leeuw served the entire HSM broad gauge line, which was extended to Leiden in 1842, to The Hague in 1843 and to Rotterdam in 1847.

In 1848, Hoop was in poor condition, and it was suggested that it be used for spare parts ('pick loco') for Snelheid. A similar plan was considered for R3 Arend and Leeuw. Due to the bad experiences with the Leiden locomotive and the cancellation of two similar locomotives, there would be no replacement for the pick locomotives set aside. It was decided to completely overhaul the four oldest locomotives. After overhauling Speed and Hoop in 1848 and 1849, Leeuw and Arend were overhauled in 1850 and 1851 respectively.

After the railway of the Nederlandsche Rhijnspoorweg-Maatschappij (NRS) had been converted from broad gauge to 1,435 mm (4 ft 8 1/2 in) standard gauge in 1854–1855, the HSM sought to purchase some of the younger broad gauge locomotives made redundant to NRS, to replace their own oldest locomotives. However, they had already been sold to the dealer B.J. Nijkerk in Amsterdam. With this trader, the HSM agreed to swap twelve locomotives with an additional payment of 2,000 guilders per unit. In 1856, ‘’Leeuw‘’ was exchanged for the younger ex-NSR locomotive 16 ‘’Bromo‘’. ‘’Bromo‘’ was immediately rejected and delivered back to the contractor. In 1857, ‘’De Arend‘’ was exchanged for the NRS 12 ‘’Vesusius‘’, which served the HSM until 1863. All the aforementioned units were ultimately scrapped.

In 1939, Hildo Krop chiselled ‘’D'Arend‘’ out in granite for his sculpture ‘’The development of the locomotive‘’, a keystone for the Weesperpoortbrug in Amsterdam.

== Replica ==
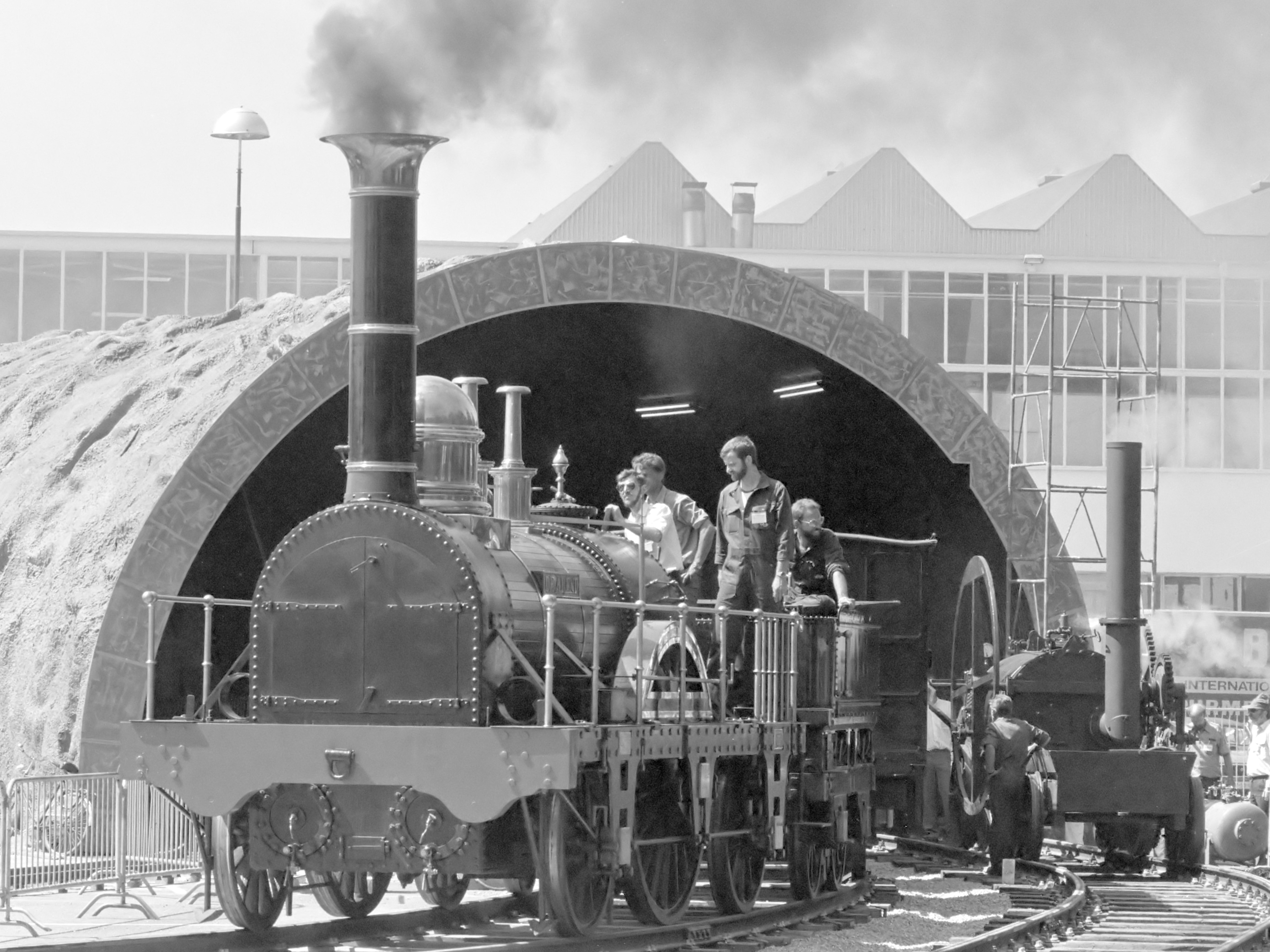
For the event ‘Treinen door de Tijd’ in Utrecht on the occasion of 150 years of the railways, the replica of ‘De Arend’ rides through a tunnel on the grounds of the Jaarbeurs; 20 June 1989.

In 1938, the Central Workshop in Zwolle built a replica on the occasion of the centenary of the railways in the Netherlands. Of twin locomotive the ‘’Lion‘’, the original drawings had survived, with which a replica was made of the ‘’Arend‘’, which had been delivered to the HSM as the second locomotive. Together with three also reconstructed matching passenger carriages (3rd class No. 10 ‘’waggon‘’, 2nd class No. 8 ‘’char à bancs‘’ and 1st class No. 4 ‘’diligence‘’), the locomotive was used in filming for the film ‘’100 years of railways in the Netherlands‘’ at Hoofddorp Station.

Bioscope newsreel from 1939. Celebrating one hundred years of Dutch Railways, with around 1:45 images of a moving replica of De Arend.

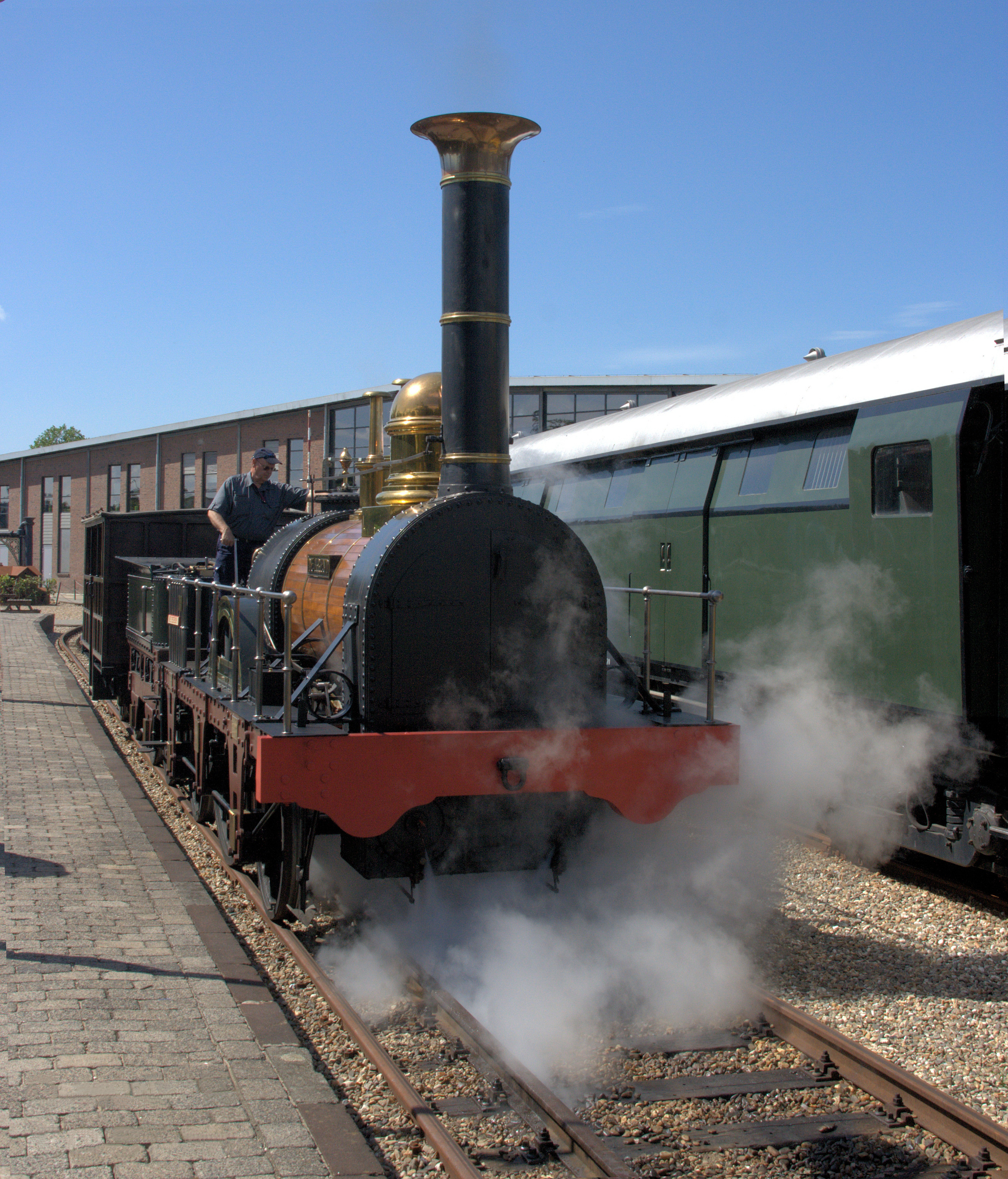
Replica of locomotive ‘’De Arend‘’ under steam; 2010.

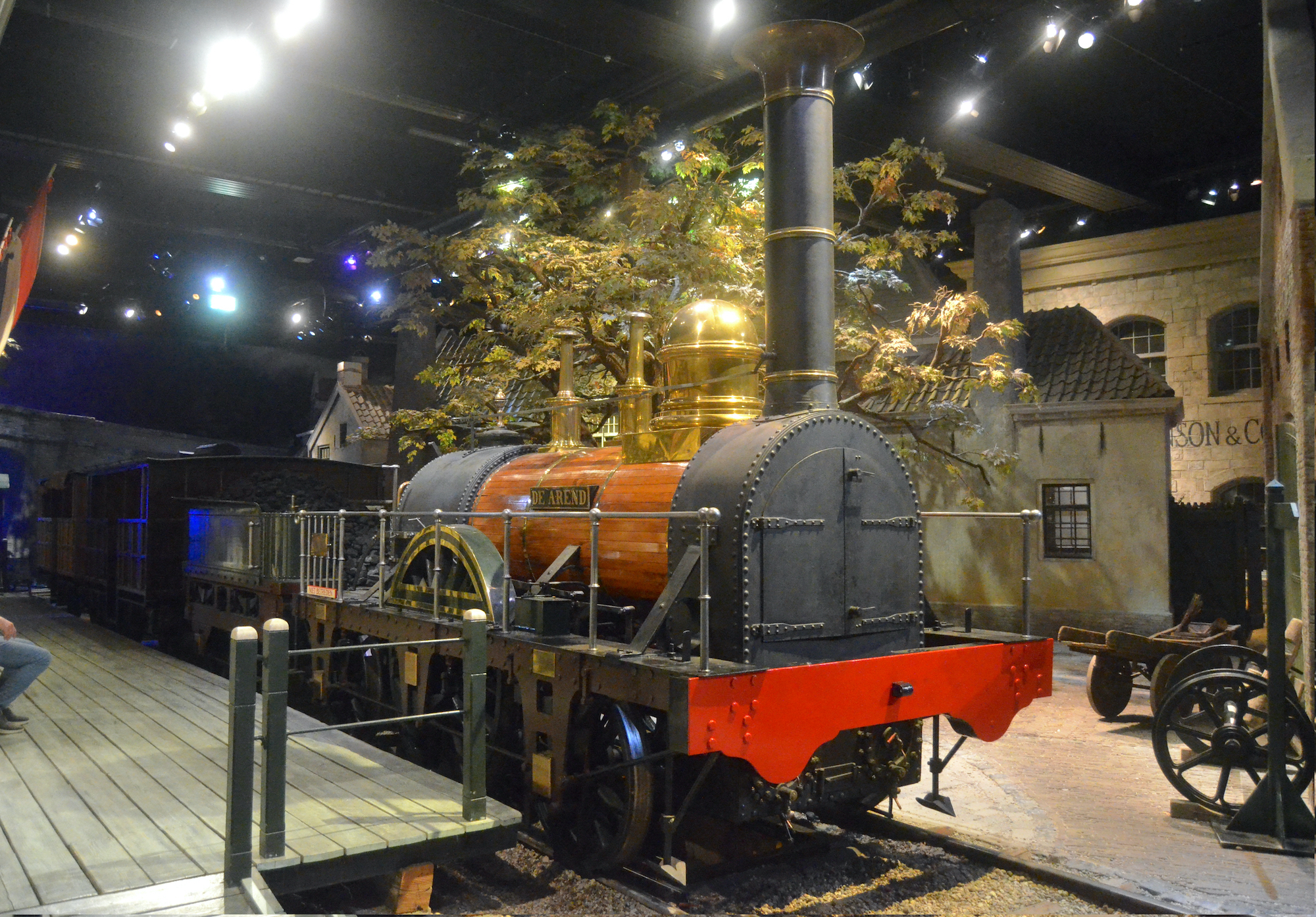
Replica of locomotive ‘’De Arend‘’ displayed in the Railway Museum; 2021.

In the summer of 1939, the Arend drove around the exhibition grounds for the Dutch railway centenary at Frederiksplein in Amsterdam. For ten cents, people could ride two round trips. At least 100,000 people did so; the train covered about 3,000 kilometres (1,900 mi) on the grounds. Afterwards, the locomotive was stored in a shed near the workshop in Zwolle. There the replica survived the destruction of Zwolle yard in 1945 by a German Sprengkommando.

In 1948, the locomotive and carriages were brought to Delft for the 100-year anniversary of the Delftsch Studenten Corps. The student fraternity was located on the Phoenixstraat, where a third rail was installed alongside the tramlijn Den Haag-Delft tracks for a length of 950 metres (1,040 yd). 13,000 people rode for a price of 15 cents.

From 21 August to 1 September 1951, the train ran in Enschede, where the ‘’FF (fecerunt fortissimo)‘’ exhibition was held in the Volkspark. 20,000 of the 210,000 visitors rode the train.

After two years in the locomotive shed in Hoorn, the train was incorporated into the newly opened Nederlands Spoorwegmuseum in Utrecht Maliebaan Station in 1953, where it has remained since.

During the 1989 ‘’Treinen door de Tijd‘’ celebrating the 150th anniversary of Dutch railways, the De Arend made its rounds on the exhibition grounds at the Utrechtse Jaarbeurs. The train then returned to the Railway Museum, and since 1989 has been used to run steam-powered rides on the museum grounds.

From 22 August to 26 October 1997, the De Arend visited Switzerland for the Swiss Railways 150th anniversary.

From 18 June to 27 June 1999, the De Arend was exhibited at the California State Railroad Museum's 1999 Railfair in Sacramento.

On 20 September 2014, the De Arend was placed in front of Amsterdam Centraal station as part of the theatre show ‘Als de dag van Toen’, to mark the 175th anniversary of the railways in the Netherlands. The locomotive was not running at the time, but the effect was created with a moving canvas landscape.

In 2016, the Municipality of Amsterdam bridge 1763 named after the locomotive

=== Broad gauge at the Railway Museum ===
Since 2005 the Railway Museum has had a length of 1945 mm broad gauge track for De Arend to run on. This track was extended at the railway yard on 19 July 2014 as part of the 175th anniversary of Dutch railways. It was largely constructed as a three-rail track and allows for the running of existing broad gauge stock on special occasions. The De Arend has been at its permanent location since 2005 with two of its carriages (8 and 10) as part of the attraction ‘’The Great Discovery‘’.

Factory number	Name	In service	Out of service	Details
119	De Arend	1839	1857	Swapped for NRS 12 ‘’Vesuvius‘’.
125	Leeuw	1839	1856	Swapped against NRS 16 ‘’Bromo‘’, rejected immediately.
Factory number	Name	In service	Out of service	Details
30	The De Arend (replica)	1939		Included in the collection of the Nederlands Spoorwegmuseum.

== See also ==
- Adler (locomotive)
- Wheel arrangement

== Literature ==
- R.C. Statius Muller, A.J. Veenendaal jr., H. Waldorp: De Nederlandse stoomlocomotieven. Uitg. De Alk, Alkmaar, 2005. ISBN 90 6013 262 9
- J. van der Meer: De Hollandsche IJzeren Spoorweg-Maatschappij. Uitg. Uquilair, 2009, ISBN 978 90 71513 68 8
- J.J. Karskens: De Locomotieven van de Hollandsche IJzeren Spoorweg Maatschappij. Uitg. J.H. Gottmer, Haarlem - Antwerpen, 1947
- G.F. van Reeuwijk: De breedspoorlokomotieven van de H.IJ.S.M.. Uitg. De Alk, Alkmaar, 1985, ISBN 90 6013 927 5.
