= Rembrandt (given name) =

- Pronunciation: English: /ˈrɛmbrænt, -brɑːnt/ Dutch: [ˈrɛmbrɑnt]
- Gender: Masculine
- Language: Dutch

Origin
- Language: Old High German

Other names
- Variant forms: Rembrand, Rembrant

Rembrandt is a Dutch given name of Old Dutch and Old High German origin. Variants are Rembrand and Rembrant. An old form was Ragemprand with Ragem, Rem (advice) and prand, brand (sword). In 2014, there were 203 persons with Rembrandt as a given name in the Netherlands.

== People named Rembrandt ==
- Rembrandt Bugatti (1884–1916), Italian sculptor
- Rembrandt Frerichs (born 1977), Dutch jazz pianist
- Rembrandt McClintock (1901–1968), Australian lithographer
- Rembrandt Peale (1778–1860), American painter
- Rembrandt Harmenszoon van Rijn (1606–1669) Dutch painter, draftsman, and graphic artist known mononymously as Rembrandt
- Rembrandt C. Robinson (1924–1972), American naval officer

=== Fictional characters ===
- Rembrandt Brown, a character on the American science fiction television series Sliders
- Rembrandt, a character on the 1979 American cult action thriller film The Warriors and the 2005 video game of the same name
