= Rheinpfeil =

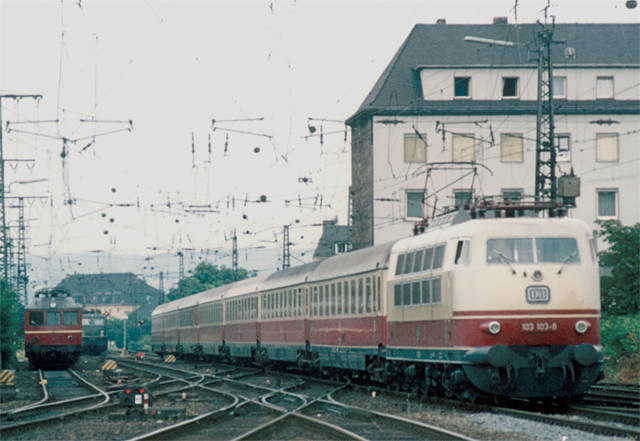

Overview
- Service type: Fernzug (F) (1952–1953) (1958–1965); Trans Europ Express (TEE) (1965–1971); InterCity (IC) (1971–1987); EuroCity (EC) (1987–1991)
- Status: Replaced by an ICE
- Locale: Netherlands; Germany; Switzerland
- First service: 18 May 1952
- Last service: 2 June 1991
- Former operator(s): Deutsche Bundesbahn / Deutsche Bahn (DB); SBB-CFF-FFS

Route
- Termini: Hook of Holland / Dortmund Hbf / Hannover Hbf / Hamburg-Altona; München Hbf / Basel SBB / Zürich HB / Chur
- Service frequency: Daily

Technical
- Track gauge: 1,435 mm (4 ft 8 1/2 in)
- Electrification: 15 kV AC, 16.7 Hz (Germany, Switzerland)
Route map
- Map showing the route of the TEE Rheinpfeil in red, and the TEE Rheingold in blue, as of 1965.

The word Rheinpfeil was used to name a number of express trains that ran in Germany between the 1950s and 1991. For much of that period, a train carrying the name Rheinpfeil also linked Germany with at least one neighbouring country.

Rheinpfeil is a German word meaning "Rhine arrow", and alludes to the Rhine valley, which always formed part of the route of the train carrying that name.

During its time as a first-class-only Trans Europe Express (TEE), the Rheinpfeil's formation (consist) included a "vista-dome car", a rarity on European railways. Seating in the dome car was unreserved.

The Rheinpfeil operated as a TEE for the last time on 25 September 1971, then becoming a two-class InterCity train. Its dome cars were transferred to the TEE Erasmus in 1973.

With the summer 1987 timetable change, on 31 May, Rheinpfeil became EuroCity train number 8/9, running Hannover–Cologne–Basel–Chur. The train carried two through DB second-class carriages Hannover to Rome, conveyed south of Basel by an ordinary express train, running via Bern and the Lötschberg railway line.

== Route ==
The core of the Rheinpfeil's route was the West Rhine Railway, a 185 km (115 mi) section of line through the Rhine valley:

- Köln Hbf – Bonn Hbf – Koblenz Hbf – Mainz Hbf

The train continued southeast via Frankfurt Hbf and Wurzburg Hbf to Munich until its route was changed in 1979 to run via Mannheim Hbf and Karlsruhe Hbf towards Switzerland. However, the northern and southern termini of the train, varied a great deal over the years.

== See also ==
- History of rail transport in the Netherlands
- History of rail transport in Germany
- History of rail transport in Switzerland
- List of named passenger trains of Europe
