= German Sleeper and Dining Car Company =

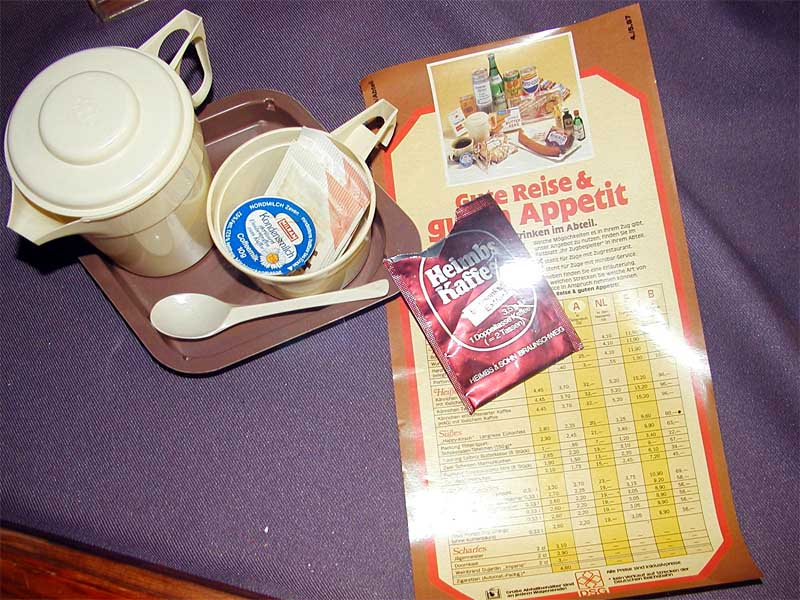
Some DSG products

The German Sleeper and Dining Car Company (Deutsche Schlafwagen- und Speisewagengesellschaft, later the Deutsche Service-Gesellschaft der Bahn or DSG) was a subsidiary of Deutsche Bundesbahn with its headquarters in Frankfurt am Main, that emerged from the Mitropa infrastructure left in West Germany in 1949. It existed until 1994 when it was combined with the East German Mitropa to form Mitropa AG.

== History ==
The DSG provided its own sleepers until 1974 and its own dining cars until 1966 and also ran the DB's half-diners, buffet, snack bar and couchette cars, the US troop trains in Germany, the German ferries of the Vogelfluglinie and the restaurants and bars on many stations in the Federal Republic of Germany (including the West Berlin restaurants at Bahnhof Zoo). In addition there were club cars, that were frequently hired by firms and other excursion companies and the "InterCity Hotels" that appeared in the 1980s. The coaching stock used stemmed mainly from the pre-war period and the 1960s. In the 1970s self-service dining cars (Quick-Pick) were introduced experimentally. In trains without dining cars the so-called minibar came into use. These were small, mobile sales trolleys from which passengers could purchase hot and cold drinks, hot sausages, pre-packed sandwiches, snacks and confectionery. The coaches were stocked at their home station and could be replenished during longer halts or at the destination station by sales staff at the respective DSG depot.

Legally the DSG and Mitropa were merged just like the Deutsche Bundesbahn and Deutsche Reichsbahn. However, in view of the considerable assets owned by MITROPA the DSG was absorbed into MITROPA. That made it the only West German company, apart from a Rheingau sekt merchants, to be absorbed by an East German firm.

== Corporate design ==
Up to 1971 the DSG continued to use the pre-war Mitropa insignia of a stylised "M" with the head of an eagle above a four-spoked wheel in an oval border (colloquially known as a Gefriergans or "frozen goose"). The decor of the DSG's own coaches was also based initially on the old Mitropa ones, including the style of signwriting designed for Mitropa ("Schulpig font" by Karl Schulpig). The base colour of the coaches varied during the 1950s from RAL 3003 ruby red to the darker RAL 3004 purple red.

=== Logo ===
In 1971 a more modern logo appeared in the form of a square cloverleaf. This was displayed on the DSG's own sleepers. The more recent coaches went into the sleeping car fleet during the 1970s and were given "Trans Euro Nacht" inscriptions to international standards. Initially they had the purple red basic livery and were only later repainted in cobalt blue. The DSG used the cloverleaf logo until their union with Mitropa (Ost).

== Sources ==
- Fritz Stöckl: Speisewagen: 100 Jahre Gastronomie auf der Schiene. Motorbuch-Verlag, Stuttgart 1987. ISBN 3-613-01168-9
- Ernst, Friedhelm u.a.: Vom F-Zug zum Intercity, EK-Verlag, Freiburg 1982 ISBN 3-88255-751-6
