= EuroCity in Germany =

The German rail network provides connections to each of its neighbouring countries, many of which are under the EuroCity classification. EuroCity services are part of the Intercity network - many EC services represented a couple of train pairs on an IC route extended across the border, while other routes are served primarily by EuroCity services. EuroCity services are generally locomotive-hauled, using Intercity rolling stock, either from Deutsche Bahn or one of the other countries along the route.

== EuroCity services ==
Below is a list of current EuroCity services in Germany.

#	Line	Route	Countries	Frequency	Stock	Name
6–9	30	Hamburg - Dortmund - Düsseldorf - Cologne - Koblenz - Mannheim - Karlsruhe - Freiburg - Basel - Zürich	Switzerland	2 per day	SBB	Rätia †
40–47	95	Berlin - Frankfurt (Oder) - Poznań - Warsaw	Poland	4 per day	PKP Intercity/DB	Berlin-Warszawa-Express
54–55	95	Berlin - Frankfurt (Oder) - Poznań - Gdańsk - Gdynia	Poland	1 per day	PKP Intercity	Berlin-Gdynia Express
80–81, 83, 88–89, 188	89	Munich - Kufstein - Innsbruck - Bolzano - Verona	Austria, Italy	1 per day	ÖBB	Paganini †
82, 189	89	Munich - Kufstein - Innsbruck	Austria	1 per day	ÖBB	
84–85	89	Munich - Kufstein - Innsbruck - Bolzano - Verona - Bologna	Austria, Italy	3 per day	ÖBB	Brenner
86–87	89	Munich - Kufstein - Innsbruck - Bolzano - Verona - Venice	Austria, Italy	1 per day	ÖBB	Tiepolo †
110–111	62	Munich - Salzburg - Villach - Klagenfurt	Austria	1 per day	ÖBB	
112–113	62	Frankfurt - Stuttgart - Munich - Salzburg - Klagenfurt	Austria	1 per day	ÖBB	
114–115	32	Münster - Dortmund - Düsseldorf - Cologne - Koblenz - Mannheim- Frankfurt - Stuttgart - Munich - Salzburg - Klagenfurt	Austria	1 per day	DB	Wörthersee
116–117	62	Frankfurt - Stuttgart - Munich - Salzburg - Klagenfurt	Austria	1 per day	DB	Wörthersee
170–171	27	Berlin - Dresden - Prague - Bratislava - Budapest	Czech Republic, Slovakia, Hungary	1 per day	MÁV	Hungaria
172–173	27	Hamburg - Berlin - Dresden - Prague - Vienna - Graz - Klagenfurt - Villach	Czech Republic, Austria	1 per day	ÖBB	Vindobona
174–175	27	Hamburg - Berlin - Dresden - Prague - Bratislava - Budapest	Czech Republic, Slovakia, Hungary	1 per day	MÁV	Jan Jesenius
176–177	27	Hamburg - Berlin - Dresden - Brno - Prague - Bratislava	Czech Republic, Slovakia	1 per day	ČD	Johannes Brahms †
178–179	27	Berlin - Dresden - Prague	Czech Republic	1 per day	ČD	Alois Negrelli †
190–197	88	Munich - Lindau - Bregenz - St. Gallen - Zurich	Austria, Switzerland	4 per day	SBB	
216–217	62	Saarbrücken - Mannheim - Stuttgart - Munich - Salzburg - Leoben - Graz	Austria	1 per day	DB	
218–219	62	Frankfurt - Stuttgart - Munich - Salzburg - Leoben - Graz	Austria	1 per day	DB	
248–249	99	Hamburg - Berlin - Cottbus - Kraków	Poland	1 per day	DB/PKP	Wawel
378–379	27	Binz - Stralsund - Berlin - Dresden - Brno - Prague - Bratislava	Czech Republic, Slovakia	1 per day	ČD	
390–391	62	Frankfurt - Stuttgart - Munich - Salzburg - Linz	Austria	1 per day	DB	

† Name no longer in use.

== Intercity services that cross borders ==
A number of trains provide international connections, but are classed as Intercity rather than Eurocity. This may be because the routes were former InterRegio services, or they only travel a short distance over the border.

#	Line	Route	Countries	Frequency	Notes
118–119	32	Münster - Cologne - Koblenz - Stuttgart - Lindau - Bregenz - Innsbruck - Salzburg	Austria	1 per day	ÖBB coaching stock
130–134, 137, 231	35	Norddeich Mole - Emden - Münster - Oberhausen - Düsseldorf - Cologne - Koblenz - Trier - Luxembourg	Luxembourg	3 per day	ex-InterRegio
140–149, 240–243	77	Berlin - Hannover - Osnabrück - Bad Bentheim - Amsterdam	Netherlands	8 per day	ex-InterRegio
180–187, 280–285	87	Stuttgart - Singen - Schaffhausen - Zurich	Switzerland	7 per day	Intercity 2
382–387	76	Hamburg - Flensburg - Fredericia - Aarhus	Denmark	3 per day	DSB
392–399	75	Hamburg - Kolding - Odense - Copenhagen	Denmark	4 per day	DSB

== ICE international ==
The ICE network has grown since its introduction, and there are now services to Aarhus, Amsterdam, Brussels, Copenhagen, Interlaken, Paris, Vienna and Zurich. In addition, there are TGV and Thalys routes to Brussels, Paris and Marseille, as well as ÖBB's Railjet to Vienna and Budapest.

== EuroCity Express ==
With the December 2017 schedule change, a new train service between Frankfurt am Main and Milan was introduced and branded by Deutsche Bahn (though neither by the Swiss nor the Italian railway companies) as EuroCity-Express followed by a second route between Munich and Zurich with tickets put in the same price category as ICE tickets, unlike "regular" EuroCity trains which are in the same - usually slightly cheaper - ticket category as IC.

== See also ==
- EuroCity
- Intercity (Deutsche Bahn)
