= Vindobona (disambiguation) =

Vindobona was an ancient Celtic settlement on what is now the site of Vienna, Austria. For the modern city, see Vienna.

Vindobona may also refer to:

- 231 Vindobona, an asteroid
- Vindobona (train), a passenger rail service operated jointly by České dráhy and Austrian Federal Railways

== See also ==
- Vin Di Bona (born 1944), an American television producer
