= Berolina (train) =

Train between Warsaw and Berlin

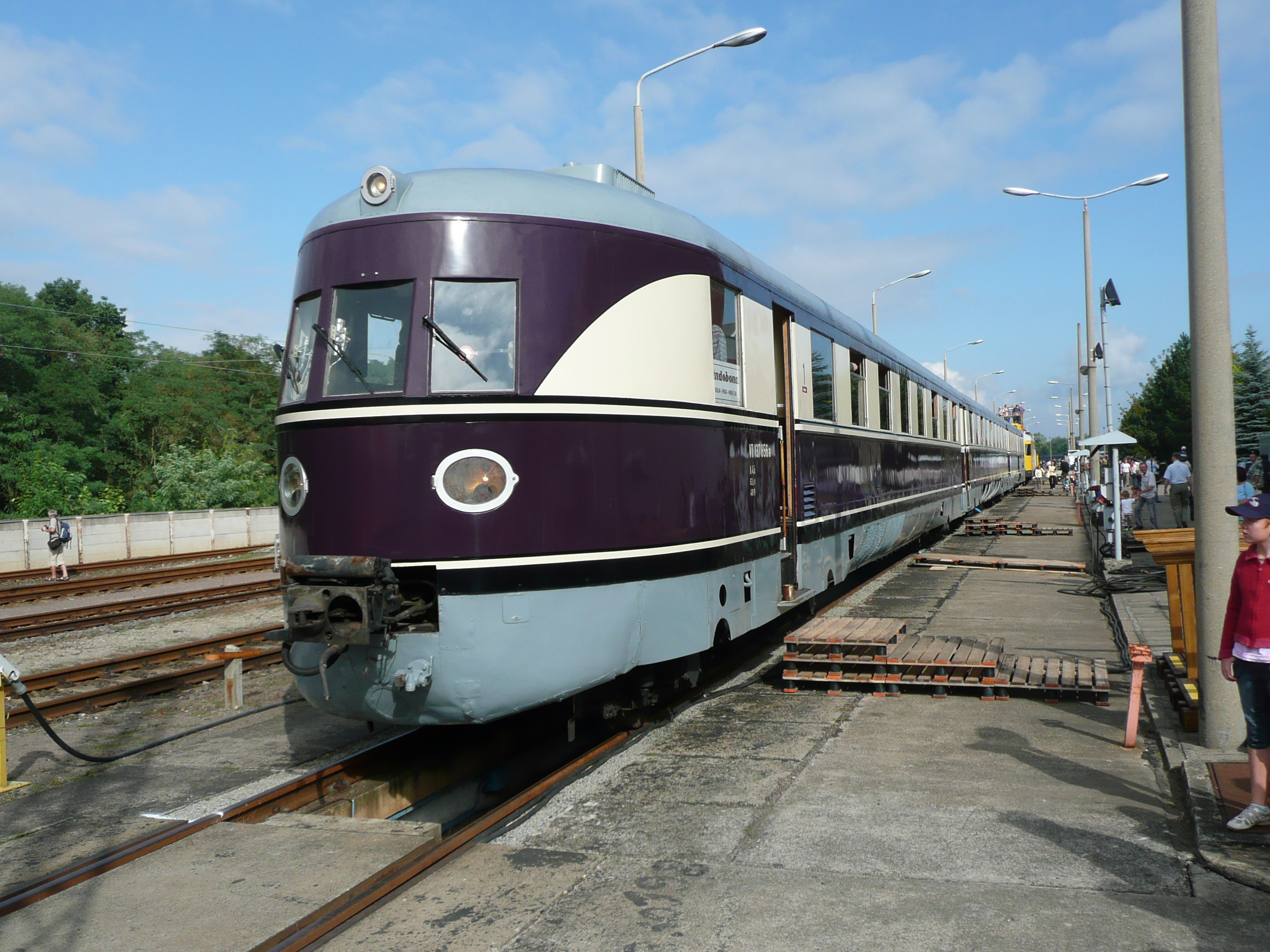
- A preserved DRG Class 137 Bauart Köln.

Overview
- Service type: Schnellzug (D) (1959–1986); Interexpress (IEx) (1986–1991); Schnellzug (D) (1991–1992); EuroCity (EC) (1992–2002); Intercity-Express (ICE) (2018–)
- Status: Absorbed by Berlin-Warszawa-Express / Operational
- Locale: Poland; Germany; Austria
- First service: 1959
- Last service: 29 September 2002(but revived in 2018)
- Successor: Berlin-Warszawa-Express/ Operational
- Former operators: Deutsche Reichsbahn, Deutsche Bahn, Polish State Railways

Route
- Termini: Warszawa Wschodnia; Berlin
- Service frequency: Daily
- Train numbers: D242/243 (1959–1986); IEx 242/243 (1986–1991); D390/391 (1991–1992); EC 42/43 (1992–2002); ICE 92/93 (2018-)

Technical
- Track gauge: 1,435 mm (4 ft 8 1/2 in)
- Electrification: 25 kV AC, 50 Hz (Poland); 15 kV AC, 16.7 Hz (Germany)

Berolina was a named passenger train between Warsaw and Berlin via Frankfurt (Oder). Introduced in 1959, it went through a number of iterations, including a short period without a name. Part of the Interexpress network as IEx 242/243 from 1986, it became categorised as EuroCity trains 42 and 43 in 1992. The service was finally replaced by the Berlin-Warszawa-Express in 2002.

Berolina is reintroduced as an ICE train from Berlin to Vienna in 2018.

The train's name, Berolina, is the Neo-Latin name for Berlin and the allegorical female figure symbolizing the city.

== History ==
Initially, the Berolina was operated using DRG Class 137 diesel multiple units (Bauart Köln). By the 1970s, these had been replaced by a rake of coaches hauled by DR Class 130 locomotives.

For part of its existence, the train continued as a Schnellzug service (D 242/243) from Berlin to Paris, France, and then returned to Berlin (as D243), in each case via the Ruhr district and Belgium. However, the name Berolina was only ever used for the section of the train's route between Warsaw and Berlin.

== See also ==
- Vindobona (train)
- History of rail transport in Germany
- History of rail transport in Poland
- List of EuroCity services
- List of named passenger trains of Europe
