= Class 350 =

Class 350 or 350 class may refer to:

- British Rail Class 350, a class of electric multiple-unit passenger trains built by Siemens
- Renfe Class 350, a series of single-cabin diesel locomotives in Spain built in the U.S. by the American Car and Foundry company
- Talgo 350, a Spanish high-speed train
- South Australian Railways 350 class, two diesel-electric locomotives built by the Islington Railway Workshops
- ZSSK Class 350, a class of electric locomotive
