= Interexpress =

Overview
- Service type: International network of express trains
- Status: Defunct
- Locale: Czechoslovakia; GDR; Hungary; Poland
- First service: 1986
- Last service: 1991
- Successor: Various, including EuroCity
- Former operators: ČSD; DR; MÁV; PKP

On-board services
- Classes: First and second class

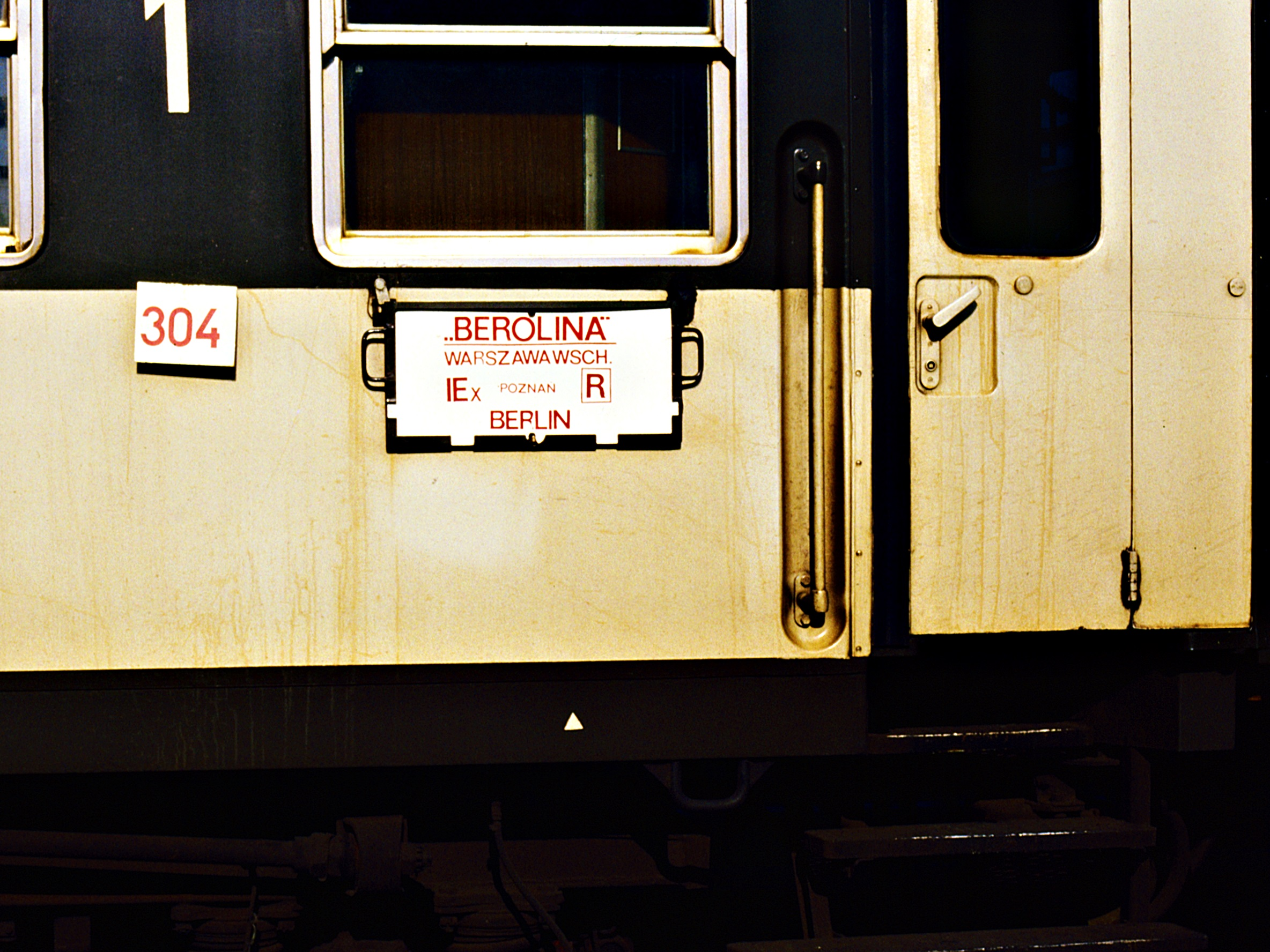
Interexpress "Berolina" Warszaw-Berlin, 1991

Interexpress (abbreviated as "IEx") is a former international train category. The word Interexpress is a short form version of the German language term Internationaler Express (English: International Express) and its foreign language equivalents.

Interexpress services operated between 1986 and 1991 as express trains between Czechoslovakia, the German Democratic Republic (GDR), Hungary and Poland.

== History ==
In the mid 1980s, the State railways of Czechoslovakia (Československé státní dráhy (ČSD)), the GDR (Deutsche Reichsbahn (DR)), Hungary (Magyar Államvasutak (MÁV)) and Poland (Polskie Koleje Państwowe (PKP)) decided to introduce the Interexpress train category for high value passenger train traffic between these four countries.

In 1986, a few Schnellzug-category trains were converted into IEx trains. This conversion anticipated by one year the equivalent transformation of international express train traffic by the Western European rail operators, which introduced their own new EuroCity system only in 1987.

Following the political changes in central Europe in 1989/1990, there was no longer any demand for an isolated train service offering for international travellers. In 1991, the IEx trains were therefore either discontinued, or converted to EuroCity trains or Schnellzug category services.

== Trains ==
The following trains operated as Interexpresses:

IEx	Name	Route
IEx 1/2	Silesia	Praha hl.n. – Warszawa Wschodnia
IEx 9/10	Polonez	Moscow (Belorussky station) - Warszawa Zachodnia
IEx 36/37	Báthory	Budapest – Warszawa
IEx 72/73	Metropol	Berlin-Lichtenberg – Praha-Holešovice – Budapest
IEx 74/75	Hungaria	Berlin-Lichtenberg – Praha-Holešovice – Budapest
IEx 76/77	Primator	Berlin–Lichtenberg – Praha
IEx 78/79	Progress	Berlin–Lichtenberg – Praha
IEx 242/243	Berolina	Berlin Hauptbahnhof – Warszawa Wschodnia

The Báthory and the Metropol were overnight trains that also included sleeping and couchette cars.

Some of the IEx trains included through coaches at least occasionally; examples were the Metropol (to Vienna), and the Berolina (from Paris). In 1986/87 and 1987/88, the Hungaria ran coupled together with the D374/375 Vindobona to Vienna, and in summer included through coaches from Malmö in Sweden.

The Progress operated as an IEx train only in 1986/87 and 1987/88 and then reverted to its previous classification. Its IEx formation (consist) included special air-conditioned Komfortwagen in a red-white livery.

The fares charged for travel in IEx trains were in accordance with the normal Schnellzug tariffs. Seat reservations were compulsory for all passengers.
