= Progress (train) =

Overview
- Service type: Schnellzug (D) (1974–1986); Interexpress (IEx) (1986–1988); Schnellzug (D) (1989–1990)
- Status: Discontinued
- Locale: Czechoslovakia; German Democratic Republic
- First service: 1974
- Last service: ca. 1990

Route
- Termini: Praha-Holešovice; Berlin-Lichtenberg / Rostock Hbf
- Service frequency: Daily
- Train numbers: D76/77 (1974–1986); IEx 78/79 (1986–1988); D278/279 (1989–ca. 1990)

Technical
- Track gauge: 1,435 mm (4 ft 8 1/2 in)
- Electrification: 15 kV AC, 16.7 Hz (Germany)

Progress was an express train between Prague, then the capital of Czechoslovakia, and the German Democratic Republic (GDR).

Introduced in 1974, Progress went through a number of iterations, and also endured a one-year period off the rails, until it ceased running altogether in about 1990.

== History ==
Progress first ran in 1974. Initially, it was categorised as a Schnellzug, D76/77, and ran between Praha-Holešovice in Prague and Berlin-Lichtenberg in East Berlin, GDR.

In 1986, Progress was recategorised as one of the new top-of-the-line Interexpress services, and renumbered as IEx 78/79. Its route remained as before.

Progress ran as an Interexpress only until 1988, when it disappeared from the timetable.

The following year, Progress was revived, and its route extended further north, from East Berlin to Rostock Hauptbahnhof in Rostock, GDR. However, it was soon discontinued once again.

== See also ==
- History of rail transport in the Czech Republic
- History of rail transport in Germany
- List of named passenger trains of Europe
