= 231 Vindobona =

Main-belt asteroid

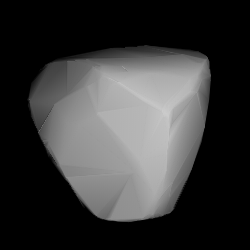
- 3D model based on lightcurve data

Discovery
- Discovered by: Johann Palisa
- Discovery date: 10 September 1882

Designations
- Pronunciation: /vɪnˈdɒbənə/
- Named after: Vindobona
- Alternative designations: A882 RB, 1962 UJ
- Minor planet category: Main belt

Orbital characteristics
- Epoch 31 July 2016 (JD 2457600.5)
- Uncertainty parameter 0
- Observation arc: 131.05 yr (47865 d)
- Aphelion: 3.3648 AU (503.37 Gm)
- Perihelion: 2.4810 AU (371.15 Gm)
- Semi-major axis: 2.9229 AU (437.26 Gm)
- Eccentricity: 0.15120
- Orbital period (sidereal): 5.00 yr (1825.2 d)
- Average orbital speed: 17.44 km/s
- Mean anomaly: 12.6140°
- Mean motion: 0° 11^{m} 50.064^{s} / day
- Inclination: 5.1021°
- Longitude of ascending node: 350.535°
- Argument of perihelion: 268.609°

Physical characteristics
- Dimensions: 82.33±2.1 km
- Synodic rotation period: 14.245 h (0.5935 d)
- Geometric albedo: 0.0545±0.003
- Absolute magnitude (H): 9.6

231 Vindobona is a large Main belt asteroid. It was discovered by Austrian astronomer Johann Palisa on September 10, 1882. Vindobona is the Latin name for Vienna, Austria, the city where the discovery was made.

Its dark surface indicates a carbon-rich composition.

Photometric observations at the Organ Mesa Observatory in New Mexico during 2012 showed a rotation period of 14.245 ± 0.001 hours with a brightness variation of 0.20 ± 0.03 in magnitude. This is in agreement with previous results.
