= Hungaria (train) =

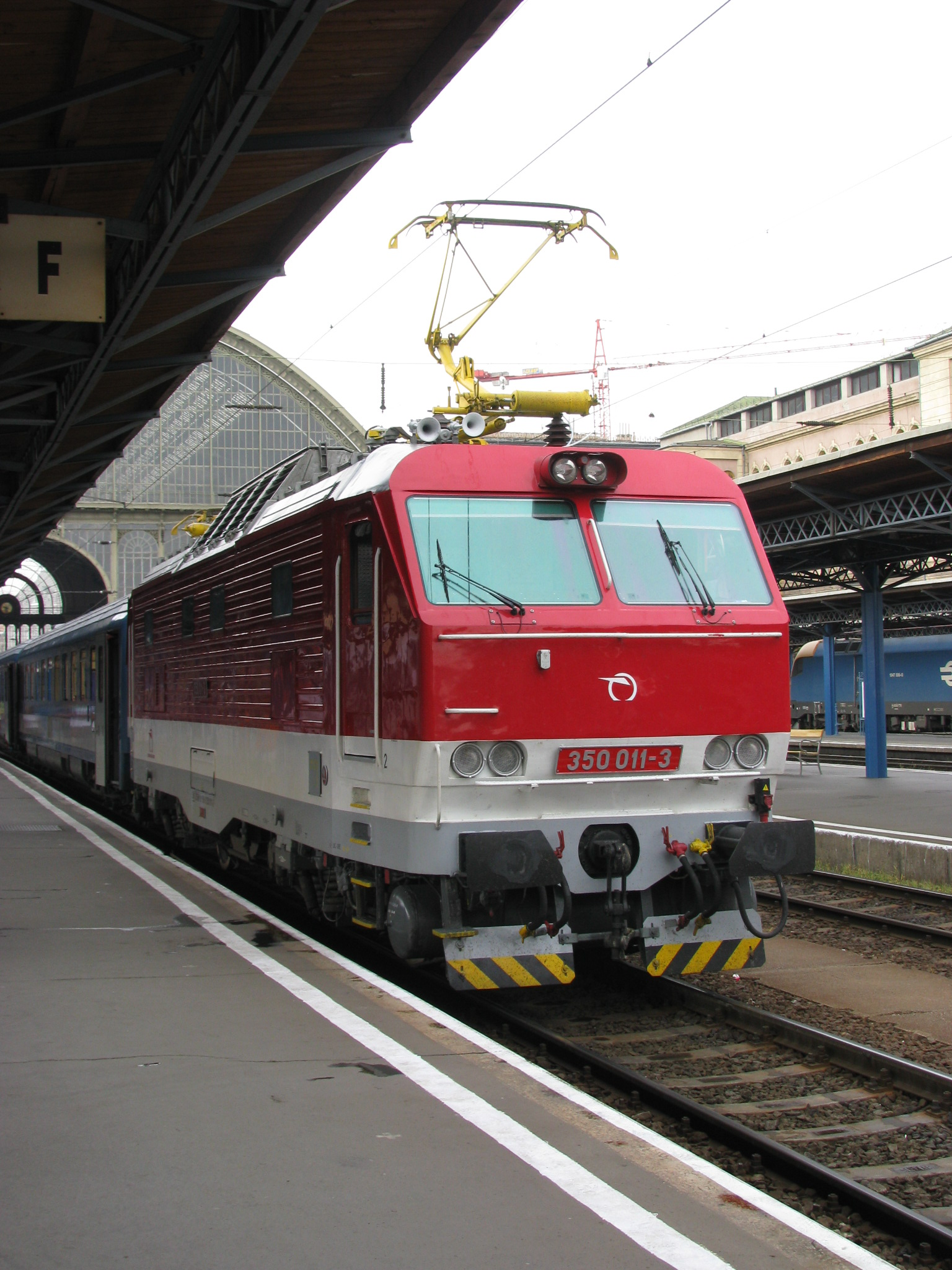
- ES 499.0 locomotive with the Hungaria at Budapest Keleti, 2009.

Overview
- Service type: Interexpress (IEx) (1986–ca. 1991); EuroCity (EC) (since 1993)
- Status: Operational
- Locale: Hungary; Slovakia; Czech Republic; Germany
- First service: 29 May 1960
- Current operators: ČD, DB, MÁV, ZSSK
- Former operators: ČSD, DR, MÁV

Route
- Termini: Budapest Nyugati; Hamburg - Altona
- Service frequency: Daily
- Train numbers: EC 170/171 (1997 - 2015); EC 172/173 (2015 - 2022); EC 252/253 (2023-)

On-board services
- Catering facilities: Utasellátó

Technical
- Track gauge: 1,435 mm (4 ft 8 1/2 in)
- Electrification: 25 kV AC, 50 Hz; 15 kV AC, 16.7 Hz

Hungaria (Hungária) is a EuroCity train which runs between Budapest Nyugati and Hamburg - Altona, currently running with coaches of MÁV. It is numbered as EC 172-173 and runs daily, mainly with MÁV owned rolling stocks.

== History ==
Earlier numbering included EC 170-171, EC 174-175, IEx 74/75 and Ex 154/155.

The Hungaria international express train is one of the oldest express trains still in operation. Its first run between Budapest and Berlin via Prague was on 29 May 1960 with a diesel locomotive. It was the first train in the former Czechoslovakia which reached a speed of 130 km/h.

During the 1970s it ran as an express train between the capitals of Hungary and East Germany under train numbers Ex 154/155. Electric locomotives were introduced in this period. The capacity of these locomotives just reached the necessary level.

There were further improvements in the 1980s. MÁV planned to introduce a high level, international rail service with other railway companies of the Eastern Bloc. The Interexpress alliance was founded with the membership of the Czechoslovak ČSD, Polish PKP, Hungarian and East German DR. The contract was signed in 1986, one year before the establishment of the Western European EuroCity network. In the timetable year of 1986 the Hungaria became an interexpress train with train numbers IEx 74/75. At this time the train terminated in East Berlin, at Berlin-Lichtenberg station, the main railway station of the city. During the next two years it had direct rolling stocks to and from Vienna and in the summer period to Malmö. During this period and usually on Hungarian territories it used the MÁV V63 locomotives.

The Interexpress network was dissolved after the regime change in Eastern Europe, so Hungaria was operated out of this system’s scope.

=== EuroCity ===
The route before 2018. The current route remains mostly unchanged with the exception of the Hungarian terminal and an extension to Hamburg-Altona.

The current system was implemented together with the EuroCity system in 1993. Its termination in Hungary was the Keleti Railway Station in Budapest until this was changed in 2018 alongside all EuroCity trains from this direction - the new terminus is the Nyugati Railway Station. The train has also been extended from Berlin to Hamburg with a total travel time of 13:49 for EC252 and 13:40 for EC253.

As of 2023 the train is pulled by a Class 193 for the entire Journey. The locomotive is provided by the Czech Railway ČD. The train has nine carriages: Two with a first class configuration (Amz and Apmz), a restaurant-car (WRmz) and six second class cars (5 Bpmz and 1 Bbdpmz). The train has carriages with wi-fi and allows for the transport of bicycles in the Bbdpmz carriage. All carriages are equipped with seats that provide 230V power, all of them are able to run at an operating speed of 200 km/h, they are air conditioned and it is possible to reserve a seat for an extra charge.

== Current route ==
Described below is the Route for EC 172, EC 173 runs in the opposite direction.

Starting at Budapest Nyugati station, the train follows the Danube upstream, stopping at Vác, Nagymaros-Visegrád and Szob.

After crossing the border to Slovakia, the last stop along the Danube river is Štúrovo, after which the route diverges from the river to head north-west towards Nové Zámky and Bratislava. The last stop in Slovakia is Kúty.

Just after crossing the border to the Czech Republic, the train stops at Břeclav. On its way further north-west, the train stops at Brno before continuing to Prague via Pardubice and Kolín. Afterwards the route follows the Vltava river north, switching to follow the Elbe river to Ústí nad Labem. The scenic route along the Elbe river is used to cross the border to Germany, reaching Děčín just before doing so.

The first stop in Germany is Bad Schandau. The train further follows the Elbe river to Dresden, serving Dresden Hauptbahnhof and Dresden Neustadt. No stop is made until the train reaches Berlin, serving Südkreuz, Berlin Hauptbahnhof and Spandau station before continuing towards Hamburg. The last leg of the route contains stops at Wittenberge and Ludwigslust. After reaching Hamburg Hauptbahnhof as the last major stop, the route concludes at Hamburg Altona.

== See also ==
- Vindobona
- History of rail transport in the Czech Republic
- History of rail transport in Germany
- History of rail transport in Hungary
- History of rail transport in Slovakia
- List of EuroCity services
- List of named passenger trains of Europe
