= Rätia (train) =

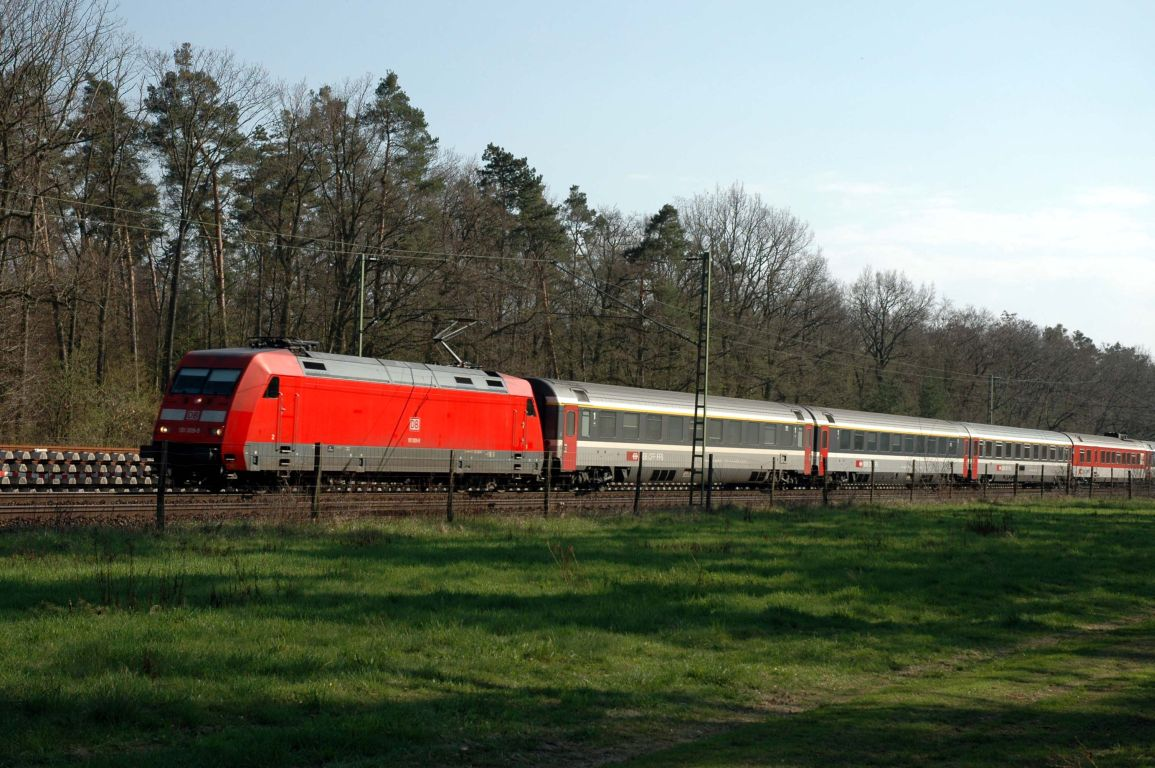
- EC 6 in Baden, Germany in 2005

Overview
- Service type: EuroCity (EC)
- Status: Active, no longer named
- Locale: Germany; Switzerland
- First service: 1987 (1998 on current route)
- Current operators: DB, SBB

Route
- Termini: Hamburg-Altona; Zurich HB) (formerly Chur)
- Average journey time: 12hr 13min
- Service frequency: Twice daily
- Train number: 8/9

On-board services
- Classes: First and second class
- Catering facilities: Restaurant
- Observation facilities: Panorama coach

Technical
- Rolling stock: DB 101/182/SBB Re460, SBB Eurofima
- Track gauge: 1,435 mm (4 ft 8 1/2 in)
- Timetable number: IC30 (Germany)

Rätia is a EuroCity train service that linked Hamburg in Germany with Chur in Switzerland via Dortmund, Cologne, Mannheim, Basel and Zurich, following the river Rhine for a significant part of its journey. The service is named after Rhaetia, the Roman province that the city of Chur was in. Over the years, the name Rätia has been given to a number EC services between Chur and various parts in Germany, although the current services - EC 6/7 - lost their name in 2004. Since 2015 the service's southern terminus was cut back to Zürich.

== Route ==
From the north, the service starts at Hamburg-Altona, and runs over the Altona link line through to Dammtor and Hamburg Hauptbahnhof. From Hamburg it heads south along the Rollbahn, taking in Bremen Hauptbahnhof, Osnabrück Hauptbahnhof and Münster, and continues on to Dortmund. From Dortmund the service heads west towards Essen and Duisburg, where it first gets close to the Rhine. It follows the river south through Düsseldorf, before crossing it (east-to-west) via the Hohenzollern Bridge, just before Cologne Hauptbahnhof.

From Cologne the train heads south again, sticking close to the Rhine on the west bank, via Bonn, Koblenz, and Mainz. This is one of the most scenic parts of the journey. It continues along the Rhine towards Mannheim, back to the east side via the Konrad Adenauer Bridge. From Mannheim, it runs briefly via the Mannheim–Stuttgart high-speed railway, before branching off to return to the rhine just before Karlsruhe. After Karlsruhe, it continues down the Rhine Valley, via Freiburg, crossing into Switzerland just before Basel Badischer Bahnhof. After this stop, it crosses the Rhine again, before entering Basel SBB station where it changes direction and changes from a German to a Swiss locomotive.

After Basel, the service diverges from the Rhine, heading towards Olten, then cutting the corner to head to Zurich Hauptbahnhof non-stop. At Zurich, the train changes direction again, and for the remainder of the journey it takes on the stopping pattern of an InterRegio service. It runs through the Zimmerberg Base Tunnel, emerging alongside Lake Zurich for the stop at Thalwil. It continues along the lake towards Pfäffikon, then alongside Walensee after Ziegelbrücke. After a stop at the junction station of Sargans, the train heads south towards Landquart and rejoins the Rhine, crossing it, then running parallel to it, as well as the narrow-gauge Rhätische Bahn railway until its final destination of Chur.

== History ==
Rätia was one of the first routes when EuroCity was introduced in 1987, but took a different route: rather than going through Dortmund and Cologne Hauptbahnhof, the service (then numbered 70/71) went down the north-south route, via Hanover and Frankfurt, picking up its current route at Mannheim. In 1989 a second pair of trains (170/171) was added on the same route.

With the opening of the Hanover–Würzburg high-speed railway in 1991, ICE services came to dominate the north–south line, so Rätia (now EC 102/103) changed its route - its northern terminus became Berlin, running via Magdeburg and Hanover to Dortmund, where it picked up its current route. In 1996, it changed again, running from Leipzig to Magdeburg instead.

In 1998 Rätia settled into its current route, from Hamburg to Chur via Cologne, and in 2002 it took on the numbers 6/7, before losing its name in 2004. From 2005 to 2015 there were two Hamburg–Chur services per day: the other pair, initially numbered 100/101, now has the numbers 8/9.

From the December 2013 timetable change, the majority of the service terminated at Zurich, with through coaches to Chur. Two years later, service 8/9 was truncated entirely to Zurich, while 6/7 was redirected to Interlaken Ost, with Chur now served by ICEs from Hamburg, running via Hanover rather than the Rhine.

== Timetable ==
The southbound service, EuroCity 9, leaves Hamburg-Altona at 6:28am, while EC 8 leaves Zurich, heading north, at 11:00, with a journey time of around 12hr 13 min, including a stop-off of around half an hour at Basel SBB, at which point the two trains pass. On Sundays until December 2016, EC 8 was replaced with EC 2, which continued to Kiel, adding around an hour to the journey.

The sister services, EC 6 and 7, operate two hours later and earlier respectively, sharing the route between Hamburg and Basel.

== Rolling stock ==
During its existence, Rätia has been operated with both DB Intercity and SBB Eurofima stock, and is currently operated by the latter - it is eleven or twelve coaches long, with three first class (one of which is panoramic) and a restaurant. In Germany, the service is hauled by a Class 101 or Class 182 locomotive, and in Switzerland by a Re 460, and previous motive power has included the DB Class 103 and the SBB Re 4/4 II.

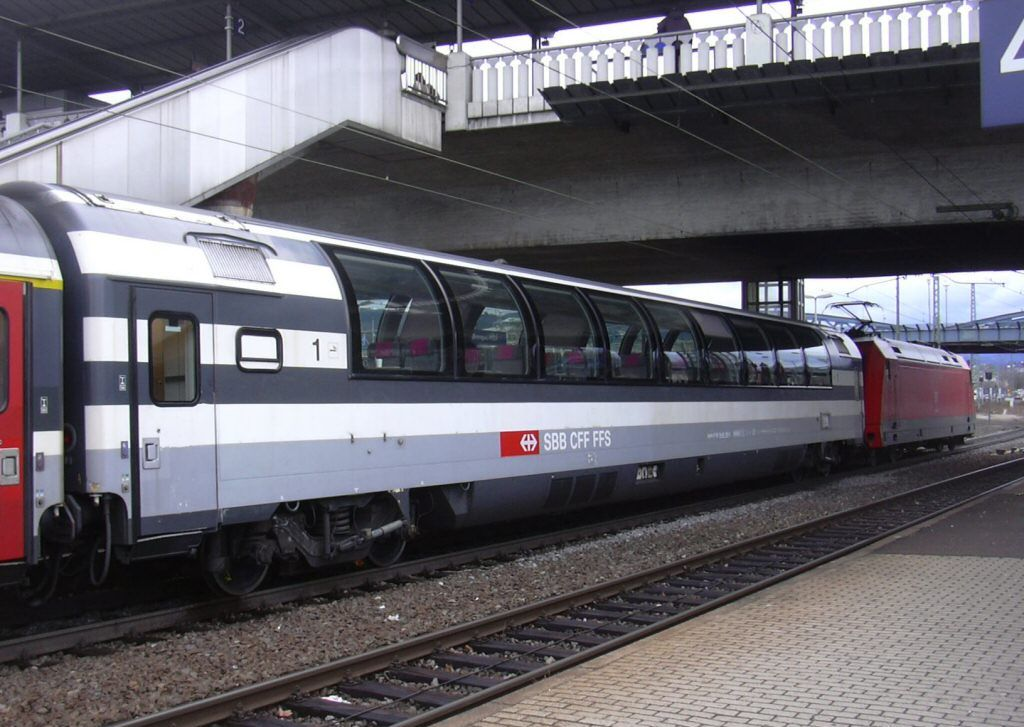
A first class panoramic coach on the service at Freiburg Hbf in 2005.
