= ZSSK Class 350 =

Class of 20 electric locomotives

ČD ES 499.0 (pre-1988) ZSSK 350 (post-1988) Škoda 55E
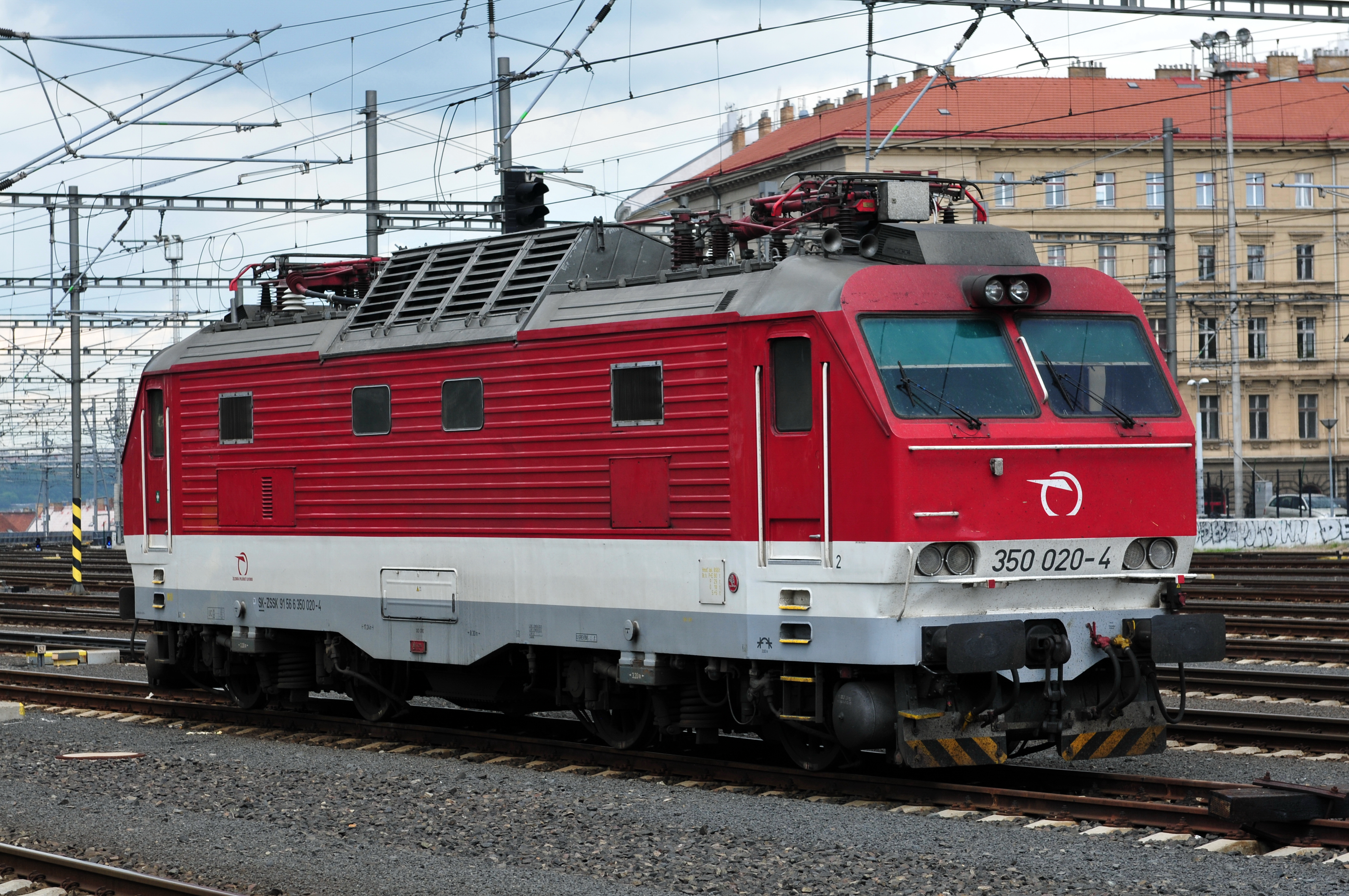
- ZSSK 350 020-4 at Praha hlavní nádraží, 2014
Type and origin
- Power type: Electric
- Designer: František Palík
- Builder: Škoda Works, Plzeň
- Build date: 1973-1975
- Total produced: 20
Specifications
- Configuration
  - AAR: B-B
  - UIC: Bo′Bo′
- Gauge: 1,435 mm (4 ft 8 1/2 in) standard gauge
- Length: 15,500 mm (50 ft 10 in)
- Width: 2,940 mm (9 ft 8 in)
- Height: 4,900 mm (16 ft 1 in)
- Axle load: 22.4 tonnes (22.0 long tons; 24.7 short tons)
- Loco weight: 88 tonnes (87 long tons; 97 short tons)
- Electric system/s: 3000 V DC; 25 kV 50 Hz AC overhead lines
- Current pickup: Pantograph
- Traction motors: 4 x AL 4741 Flt
- Train brakes: DAKO DK-GP air brake DAKO BSE electrodynamic brake
- Safety systems: MIREL and ETCS
Performance figures
- Maximum speed: 160 km/h (99 mph)
- Power output: 4,200 kW (5,632 hp) (hourly); 4,000 kW (5,364 hp) (continuous)
- Tractive effort: 210 kN (47,210 lbf) (starting); 134 kN (30,124 lbf) (hourly); 126 kN (28,326 lbf) (continuous)
Career
- Operators: ČSD » ŽSR » ZSSK
- Numbers: ČSD: ES 499.0001 – 499.0020; ZSSK: 350 001 – 020
- Nicknames: Gorilla, Krysa, Potkan
- Locale: Budapest - Bratislava - Prague; Košice - Žilina - Bratislava; Košice - Miskolc - Budapest
- First run: 9 April 1974 (test runs); 28 December 1974 (revenue)
- Current owner: Železničná spoločnosť Slovensko
- Disposition: two scrapped, rest in service

The ZSSK Class 350 (prior to 1988: ČSD Class ES 499.0) is an electric locomotive of the Železničná spoločnosť Slovensko (Slovak Railway Company) and previously of the Československé státní dráhy (Czechoslovak State Railways). Introduced in 1974, they became the first dual-system locomotives in Czechoslovakia, and have been used to haul express trains on the Bratislava - Prague railway corridor since then.

Between 1965 and 1975, express trains on the Prague - Bratislava main line were hauled by the E 499.1 (top) and S 489.0 (bottom) locomotives.
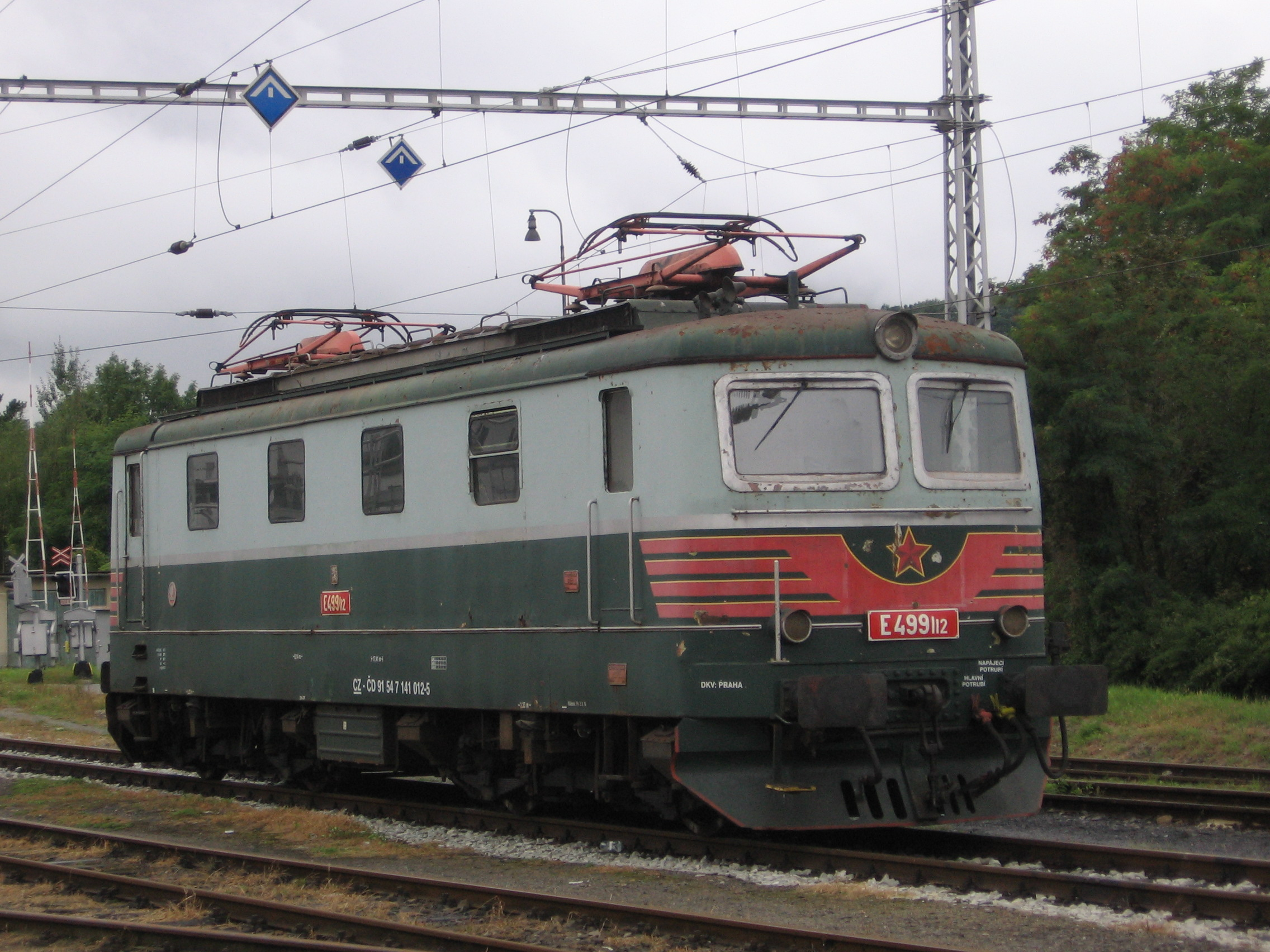
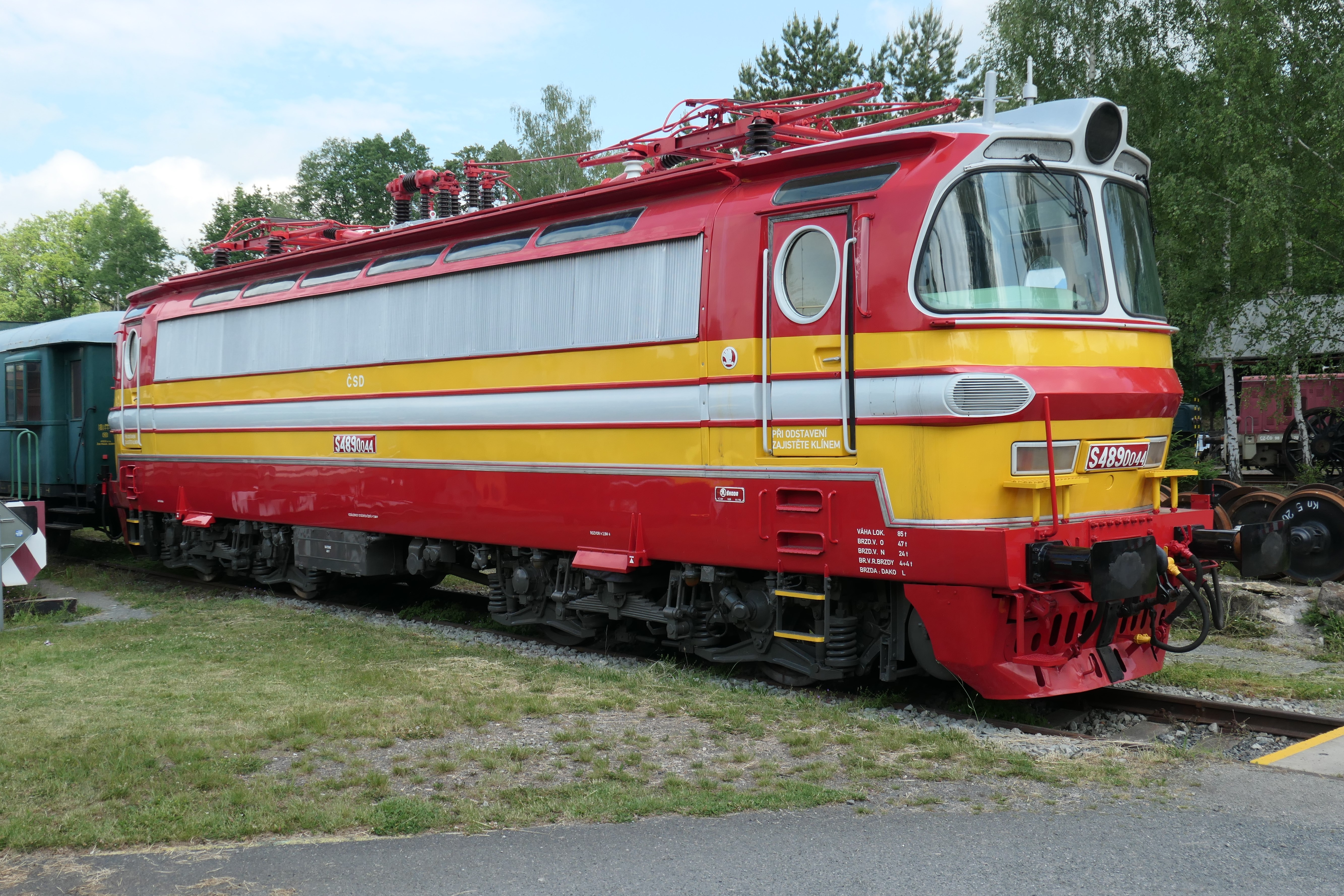

They are nicknamed "Gorilla" among railfans due to this locomotive being featured in 1989 on a postage stamp of Guinea-Bissau.

== Accidents ==
- 28 June 1977: ES 499.0010 was hauling the southbound Meridian (Ex 271, Malmö to Bar) when it derailed shortly before 10 AM due to excessive speed (over 90 km/h (56 mph) in a 40 km/h (25 mph) zone enforced by railway signals) at the northern end of Bratislava hlavná stanica, overturning, hitting a retaining wall, an electric shunter (S 458.0004) of the station, before coming to a rest turned 180 degrees. The driver of the Meridian was killed after falling out of the locomotive and another 21 persons were injured. The locomotive had only travelled 312,828 kilometres (194,382 miles) at the time of the accident, and was eventually scrapped after a year and a half in service. The accident's causes are still unknown to this day due to the death of the train driver but he had unexplainably accelerated between Lamač and the tunnels just north of the railway station. The investigative committee and the railway workers eventually got involved in lengthy polemics in their attempts to find an explanation for the accident; the committee blamed the accident on the brake failure while the railwaymen believed the cause to be something else.
- 10 November 1989: 350 009 was hauling the northbound Balt-Orient (Ex 372, Bucharest to Berlin) when it passed a signal at danger and hit a local train (consisting of EMUs 460 081+082) from Praha-Holešovice to Děčín hl. n. from the rear, four minutes after midnight, at a speed of 116 km/h (72 mph), in Nové Kopisty. The accident led to 6 deaths and 58 injuries; the train was lightly loaded due to the fall of the Berlin Wall that had happened a few hours earlier. The locomotive was scrapped, along with the first 6 cars of the express train. The accident was caused by the poor functioning of the in-cab alerter system.
- 23 January 2013: 350 011 was hauling the westbound Kriváň (IC 507, Košice to Bratislava hl. st.) when it hit a snowplow truck at a level crossing near Liptovský Mikuláš, leading to the death of a 50 year old train driver, Ján Šarudi. The locomotive was out in service for a year until it was repaired by ŽOS Vrútky and re-entered service in 2014.
