= Vindobona (train) =

International express train

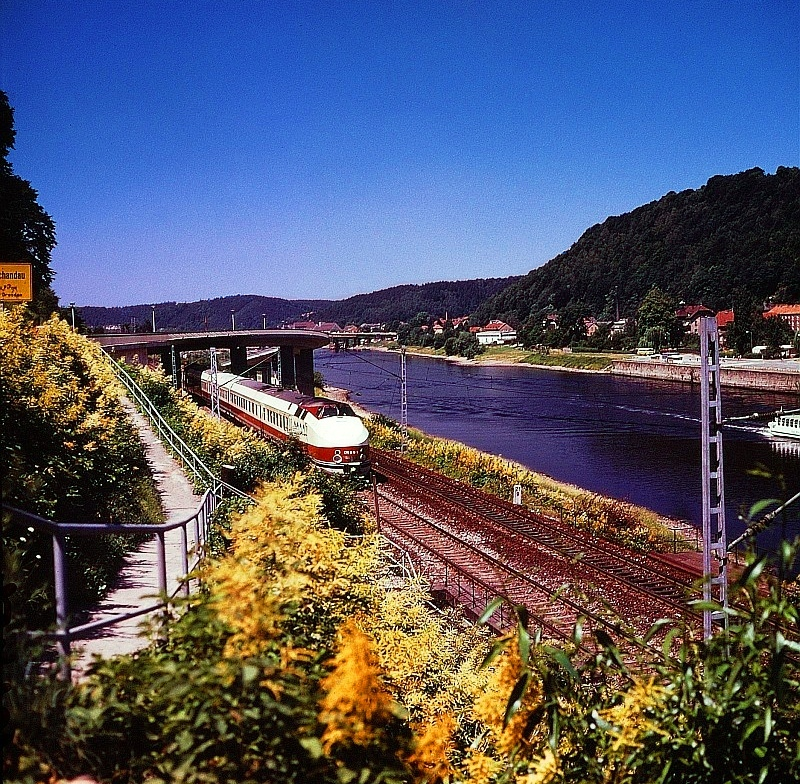
- 175 DR diesel multiple unit in the Elbe valley near Bad Schandau, 1975

Overview
- Service type: Inter-city rail
- Status: Running
- First service: 1957
- Last service: 2014
- Current operator: České dráhy
- Former operators: Deutsche Reichsbahn, from 1994: Deutsche Bahn; Czech Československé státní dráhy, from 1993: České dráhy Österreichische Bundesbahnen

Route
- Termini: Berlin-Charlottenburg; Graz Hbf
- Stops: 27
- Distance travelled: 1,459 kilometres (907 mi)
- Service frequency: Daily
- Train numbers: EC 172/173 (1993-2014); Railjet 256/257 (2020-)

The Vindobona is an international named passenger train which began service in 1957 between Berlin and Vienna via Dresden and Prague. In later years the route was extended to run from Hamburg via Berlin, Dresden, Prague, Brno and Vienna to Villach. It was named after the ancient settlement of Vindobona on the site of the modern city of Vienna. Labelled as a EuroCity train connection from 1993, services discontinued in 2014.

Since December 2018 there is a daily direct Intercity-Express high-speed train between Vienna and Berlin via Linz, Passau and Erfurt. The name Vindobona is now used for Railjet trains between Prague and Graz via Vienna operated by České dráhy and Austrian Federal Railways (ÖBB). This route has been again extended to Berlin from mid-2020.

== Route ==
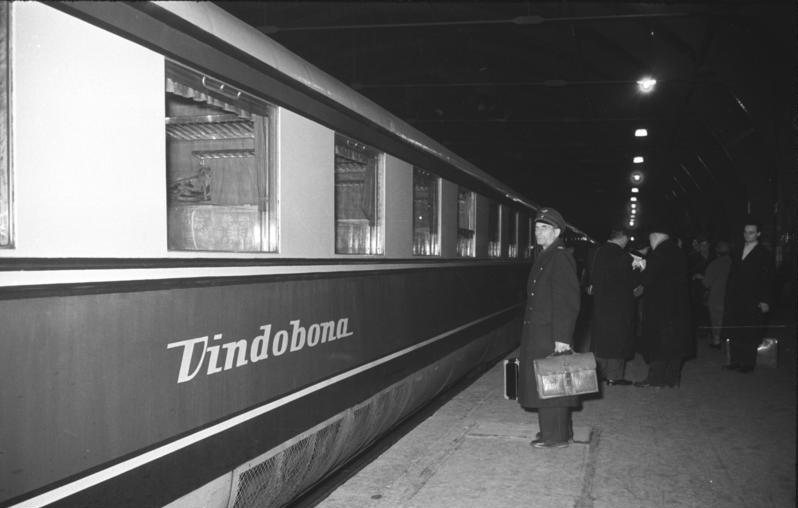
DR SVT 137 Vindobona at Berlin Ostbahnhof, 1957

The service began on 13 January 1957 using diesel multiple units classified as Fernschnellzug (FDt 50/51) running from Friedrichstraße station in East Berlin via Berlin Ostbahnhof, Elsterwerda, Dresden Hauptbahnhof, Prague hlavní nádraží and České Velenice/Gmünd to Wien Franz-Josefs-Bahnhof. The FDt trains had already begun running between Berlin and Prague in December 1950, including a through coach connection to Vienna. In 1959 the connection was upgraded as Expresszug (Ext 54/55).

From December 1957 the railcars had first and second class sections. The participating companies Deutsche Reichsbahn (DR), Československé státní dráhy (ČSD) and Österreichische Bundesbahnen (ÖBB) operated one train pair daily, meeting in Czechoslovakia. The service was used primarily by West Berliners, diplomats and Scandinavians in transit through East Germany, connecting from the night trains from Copenhagen (Ostsee-Express) and Stockholm (Saßnitz-Express) via train ferry from Warnemünde and Sassnitz resp., and shuttle trains from Zoologischer Garten station in West Berlin. In the dining car, passengers could pay using Deutschmark, East German mark, Czechoslovak koruna, and Austrian schilling.

In Czechoslovakia trains originally ran on the historic Franz-Josefs-Bahn via Tábor to the border with Austria at České Velenice, later rerouted via the first Czech railway corridor to Brno and Břeclav. In the period of "Normalization" from 1969 onwards, domestic travel within Czechoslovakia was for some years completely forbidden, occasionally restricted to journeys between Děčín and Tábor. The original journey via Tábor took over 12 hours to complete from Berlin to Vienna. Later, the mainline via Brno became faster, and the train was rerouted, initially via Havlíčkův Brod and later via Pardubice and Česká Třebová along the Czech international corridor, shortening the journey to 9 hours. In 1975, Wien Mitte station became the terminus due to construction at the Franz-Josefs-Bahnhof.

== Rolling stock ==
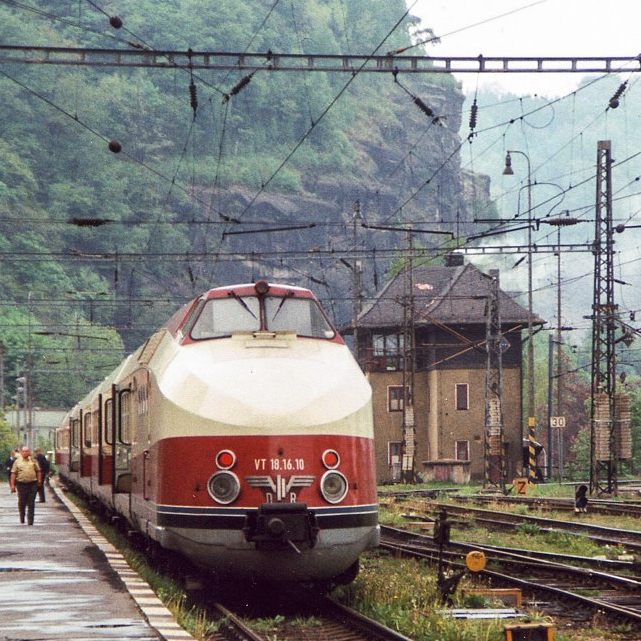
DR VT 18.16.10 at Děčín border crossing

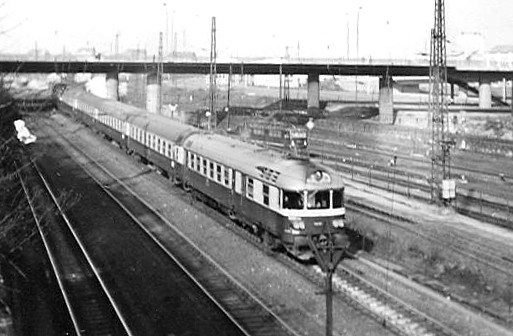
ČSD M 296.1 at Dresden

Rolling stock was alternately supplied by the railway companies for a period of two years: The DR used a refurbished pre-war DRG Class SVT 137 unit until 1960, succeeded by MÁVAG 495.0 and 498.0 railcars operated by ČSD, and ÖBB 5145 ("Blue Lightning") DMUs from 1962 to 1964. In 1966 DR introduced its newly engineered VT 18.16 diesel-hydraulic express railcars, apparently rivalling with the West German DB Class VT 11.5. Renamed Class 175 in 1970, these prestigious trainsets became a flagship in the range of DR services. From 1969 to 1972, ČSD operated its recently developed M 296.1 railcars with a top speed of 120 km/h (75 mph).

The Vindobona trains continued to be operated by DMUs until it became evident that they were no longer able to cope in terms of capacity. In 1979 they were replaced by a composition comprising an electric locomotive coupled with individual carriages. The trains then ran as Durchgangszug (D 275/276) and from 1986 to 1988 services were united with the Hungaria Interexpress train to Bratislava and Budapest, including Hungarian State Railways (MÁV) railcars and Yugoslav Railways (JŽ) through coaches to Belgrade. In later years trains were hauled by DB Class 101, ČD Class 371 and Class 380, and ÖBB 1216 (EuroSprinter) locomotives.

== EuroCity ==
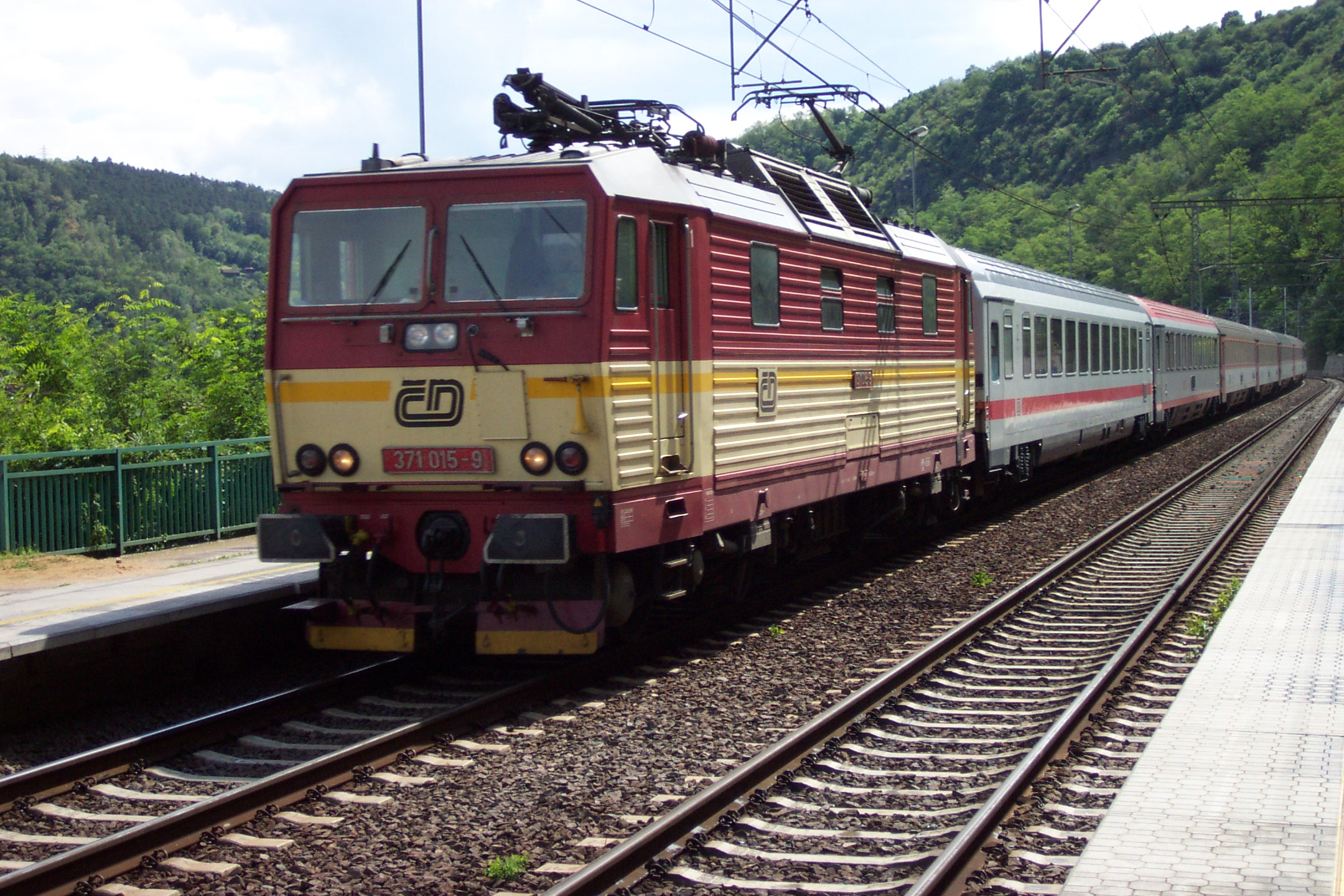
ČD 371 EuroCity Vindobona at Řež, 2007

After the Revolutions of 1989 and the fall of the Iron Curtain, the railway connection gained new significance. A EuroCity (EC) service from Hamburg to Prague was already inaugurated in 1992 and in the following year, the Vindobona train also became categorised as EC 172/173. The DR operations were taken over by Deutsche Bahn AG by 1994. With the opening of Berlin Hauptbahnhof on 28 May 2006, trains passed through Berlin via the new North–South mainline. As of 2010, trains ran 1,469 kilometres (913 mi) from Villach Hauptbahnhof to Hamburg-Altona via Klagenfurt, Vienna, Brno, Prague, Dresden and Berlin in about 16 hours.

As of 14 December 2014, the EC 172/173 Vindobona was replaced by the EC 172/173 Porta Bohemica from Hamburg-Altona to Budapest Keleti, connecting in Prague hlavní nádraží to a Railjet train service via the newly built Wien Hauptbahnhof to Graz Hauptbahnhof and vice versa. Since December 2018 there is a daily direct DB Intercity Express high-speed train (ICE 92/93 Berolina) from Berlin to Vienna via Erfurt, Nuremberg and Linz, as well as a ÖBB Nightjet train with sleeping car (NJ 456/457) via Wrocław, Bohumín and Břeclav. Since December 2023, the Nightjet services run via Prague, and not via Poland. The name Vindobona has then been reused for the Railjet line connecting Prague, Vienna and Graz (RJ 256/257). After delays due to the COVID-19 pandemic, this route has been extended to Berlin from 14 June 2020; thus, the historic train connection is reestablished, later operating in parallel with a more northerly train connection which runs from Copenhagen via Hamburg and Berlin to Prague.

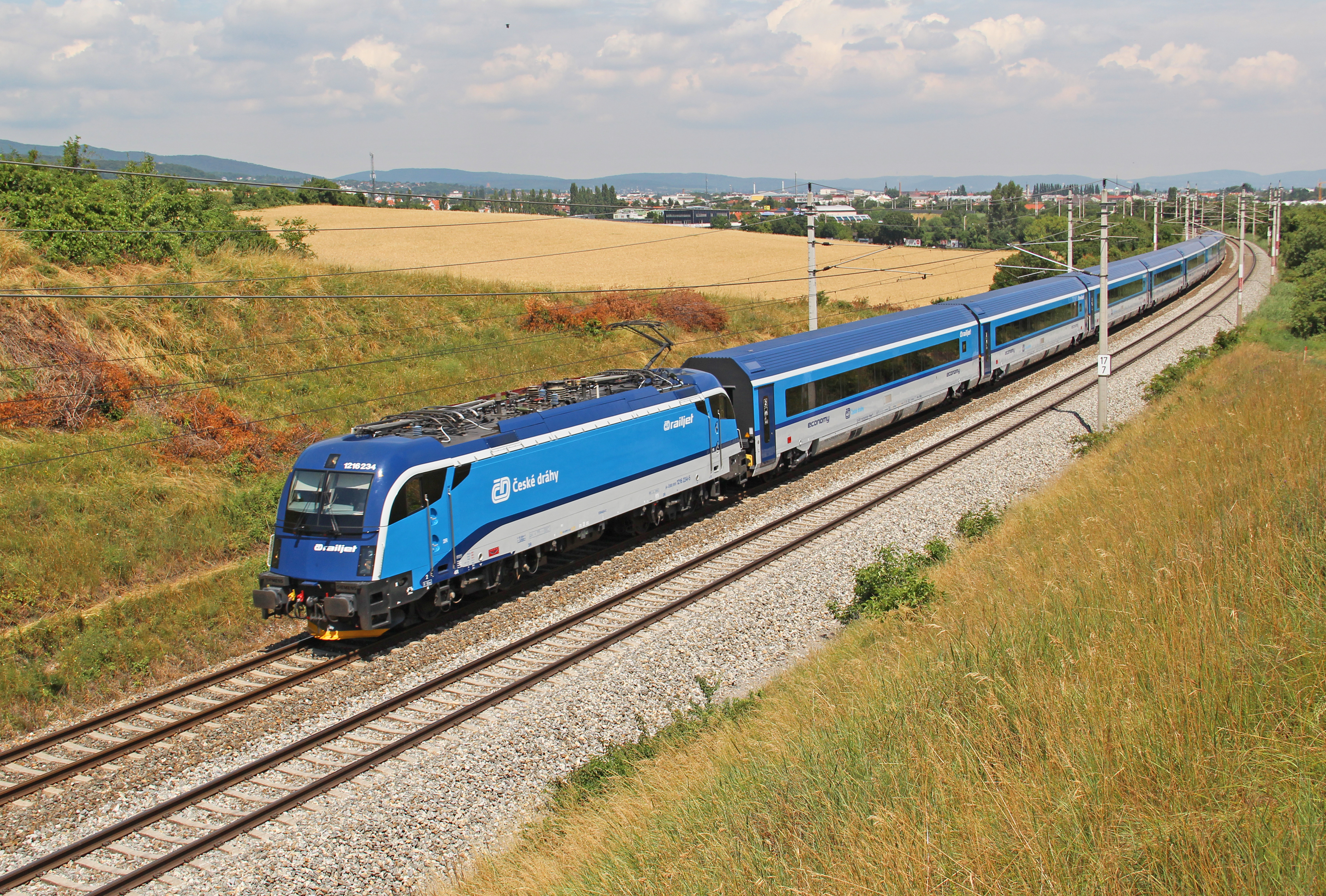
ČD railjet now operates Vindobona trains
