= Vindobona =

Roman military camp in modern Vienna

- Vienna in Austria
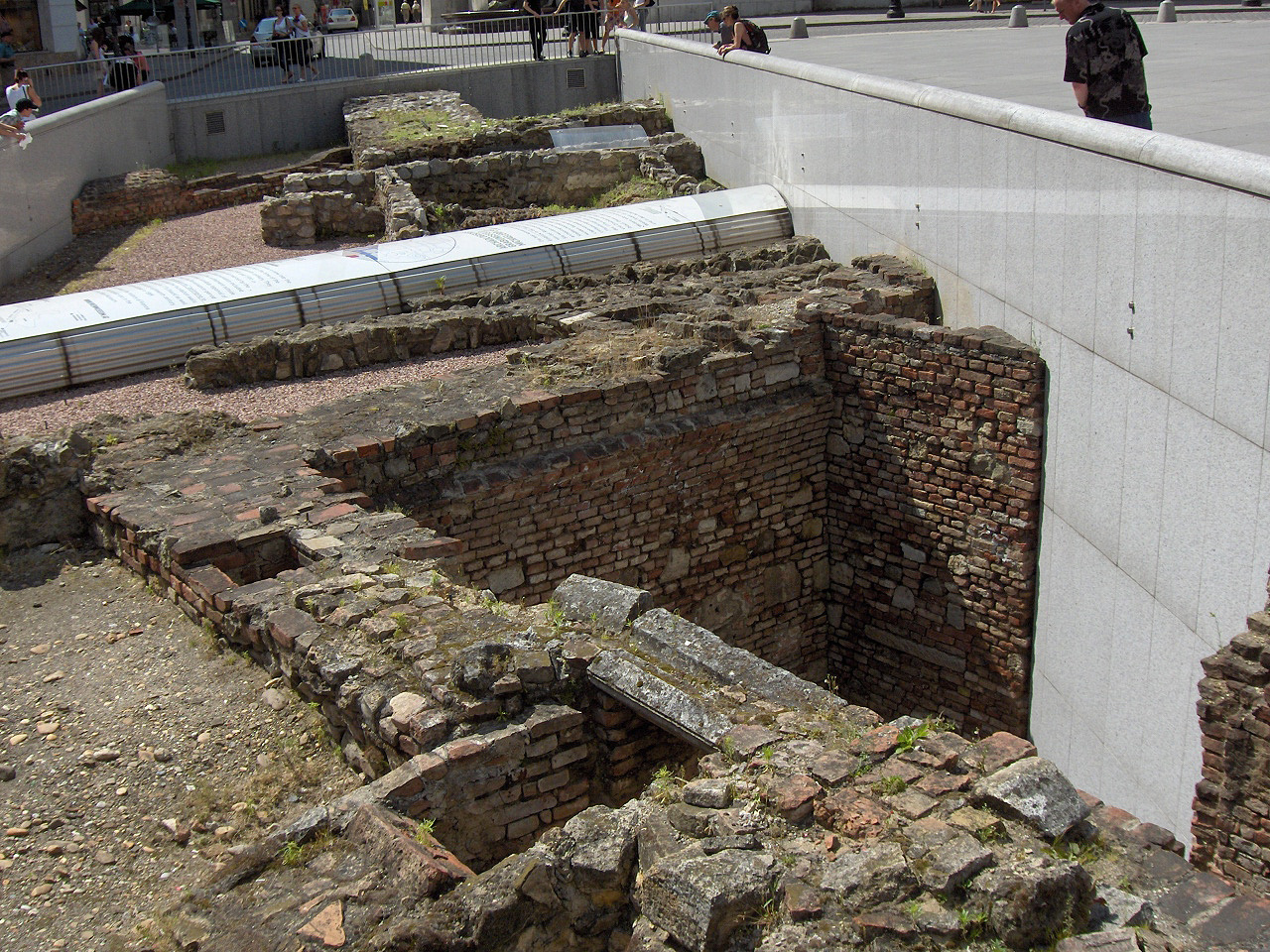
- The excavated ruins of Vindobona on the Michaelerplatz

Site information
- Type: Roman fortification

Location
- Map of the Roman castrum of Vindobona in 250–300
- Location within Vienna Location within Austria
- Coordinates: 48°12′39″N 16°22′13″E

Site history
- Built: c. 100
- In use: 103–433
- Fate: Abandoned to the Huns

Garrison information
- Garrison: X Gemina
- Designations

UNESCO World Heritage Site
- Part of: Frontiers of the Roman Empire – The Danube Limes (Western Segment)
- Criteria: Cultural: ii, iii, iv
- Reference: 1608bis-066
- Inscription: 2021 (44th Session)

Vindobona (Latin pronunciation: [wɪnˈdɔbɔna]; from Gaulish windo- "white" and bona "base/bottom") was a Roman military camp (or castra) in the province of Pannonia, located on the site of the modern city of Vienna in Austria. The settlement area took on a new name in the 13th century, Berghof, now known as Alter Berghof (Old Berghof).

Around 1 AD, the kingdom of Noricum was included in the Roman Empire. Henceforth, the Danube marked the border of the empire, and the Romans built fortifications and settlements on the banks of the Danube, including Vindobona with an estimated population of 15,000 to 20,000.

== History ==
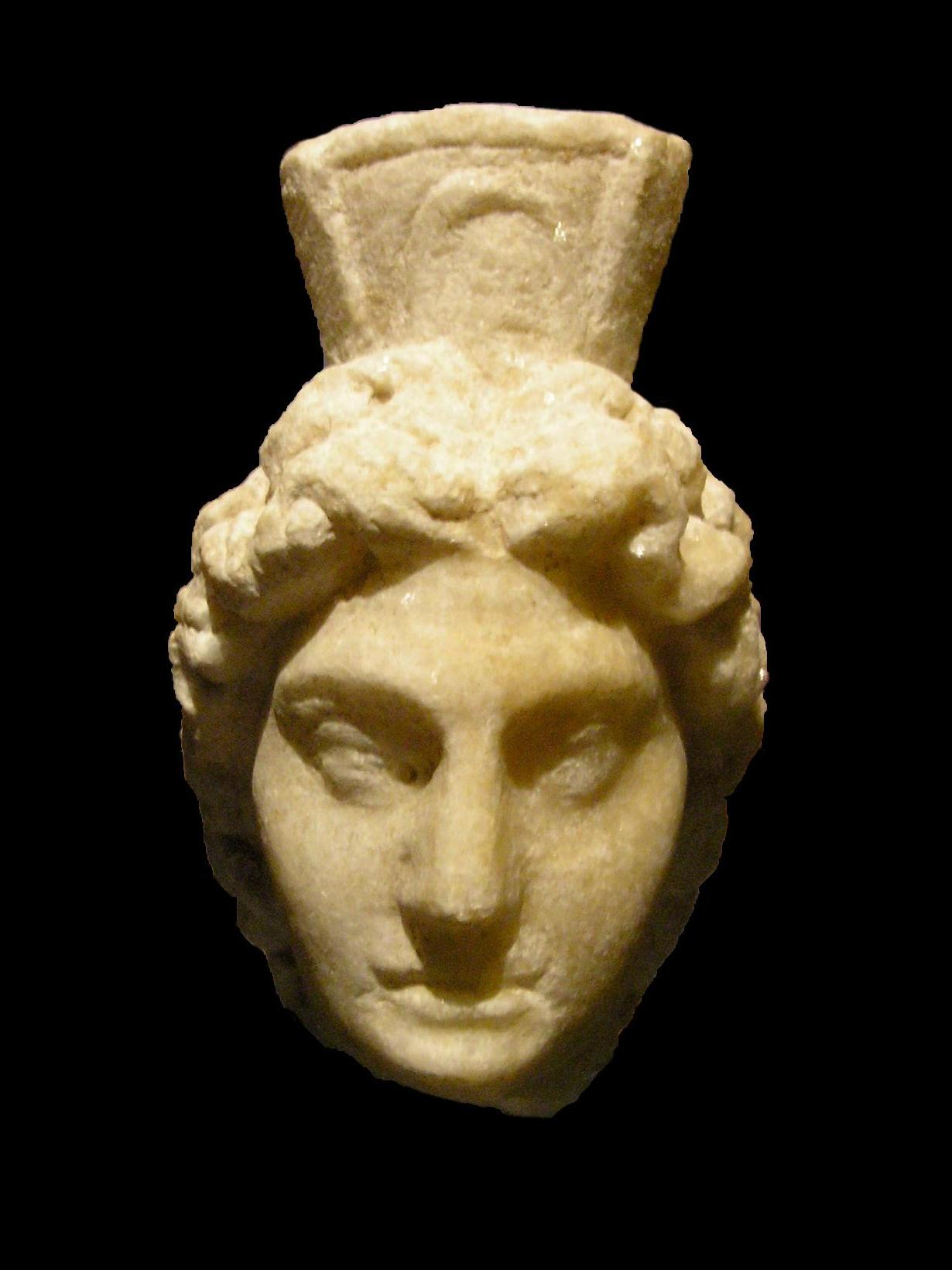
Head of a genius found during excavations of Vindobona

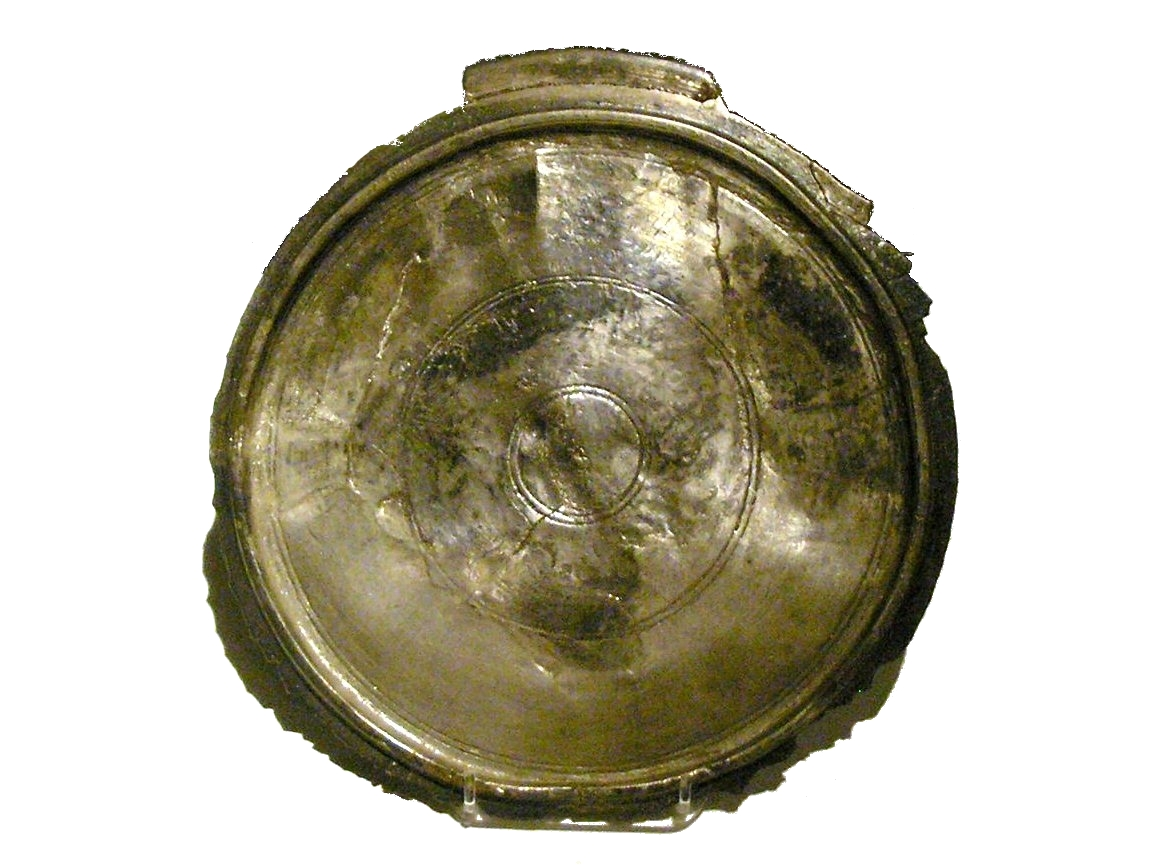
Silver plate, part of a larger find found around Kärntner Straße in 1945

Early references to Vindobona are made by the geographer Ptolemy in his Geographica and the historian Aurelius Victor, who recounts that emperor Marcus Aurelius died in Vindobona on 17 March 180 from an unknown illness while on a military campaign against invading Germanic tribes. Today, there is a Marc-Aurelstraße (English: Marcus Aurelius street) near the Hoher Markt in Vienna. However, Tertullian's Apologeticum places Marcus Aurelius' death at Sirmium (province of Pannonia Inferior, modern Sremska Mitrovica).

It is possible that Vindobona as a legionary fortress was built around the year 100, since the oldest excavated building inscriptions date from 103.

Vindobona was part of the Roman province of Pannonia, whose regional administrative centre was Carnuntum. Vindobona was a military camp contiguous to the civilian city of Canabae. The military complex covered some 20 hectares, housing about 6000 men, where Vienna's first district now stands. The Danube marked the border of the Roman Empire, and Vindobona was part of a defensive network including the camps of Carnuntum, Brigetio and Aquincum. By the time of Emperor Commodus, four legions (X Gemina, XIV Gemina Martia Victrix, I Adiutrix and II Adiutrix) were stationed in Pannonia.

Vindobona was provisioned by the surrounding Roman country estates (Villae rusticae). A centre of trade with a developed infrastructure as well as agriculture and forestry developed around the town. Communities developed outside the fortifications (canabae legionis), as well another community independent of the military authorities in today's third district. A Germanic marketplace settlement faced Vindobona on the far side of the Danube from the second century onwards.

The uncharacteristically asymmetrical layout of the military camp is still recognisable in Vienna's street plan: Graben, Naglergasse, Tiefer Graben, Salzgries, Rabensteig, Rotenturmstraße. The oblique camp border along today's Salzgries Street was probably caused by a great flood of the Danube during the 3rd century which eroded a considerable part of the camp. The name "Graben" (ditch) is believed to recall the defensive ditches of the military camp. (It is thought that at least parts of the walls still stood in the Middle Ages, when these streets were laid out, and thus determined their routes.) The Berghof was later erected in one corner of the camp.

Rebuilt after Germanic invasions in the second century, the town remained a seat of Roman government through the third and fourth centuries. The population fled after the Huns invaded Pannonia in the 430s and the settlement was abandoned for several centuries.

== Evidence for the Roman presence in Vindobona ==
=== Archaeological remains ===
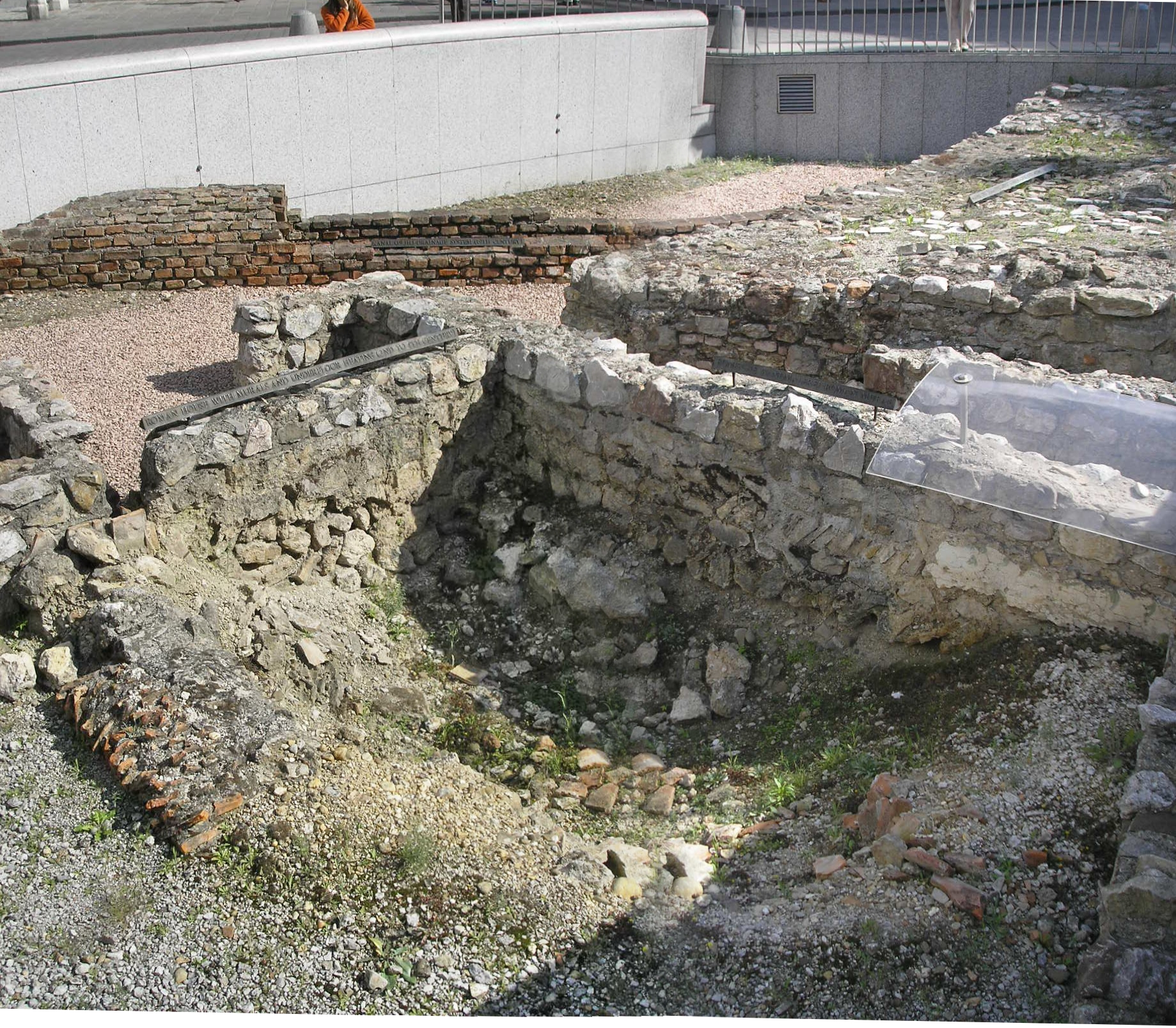
Remains of the Roman outpost at Michaelerplatz

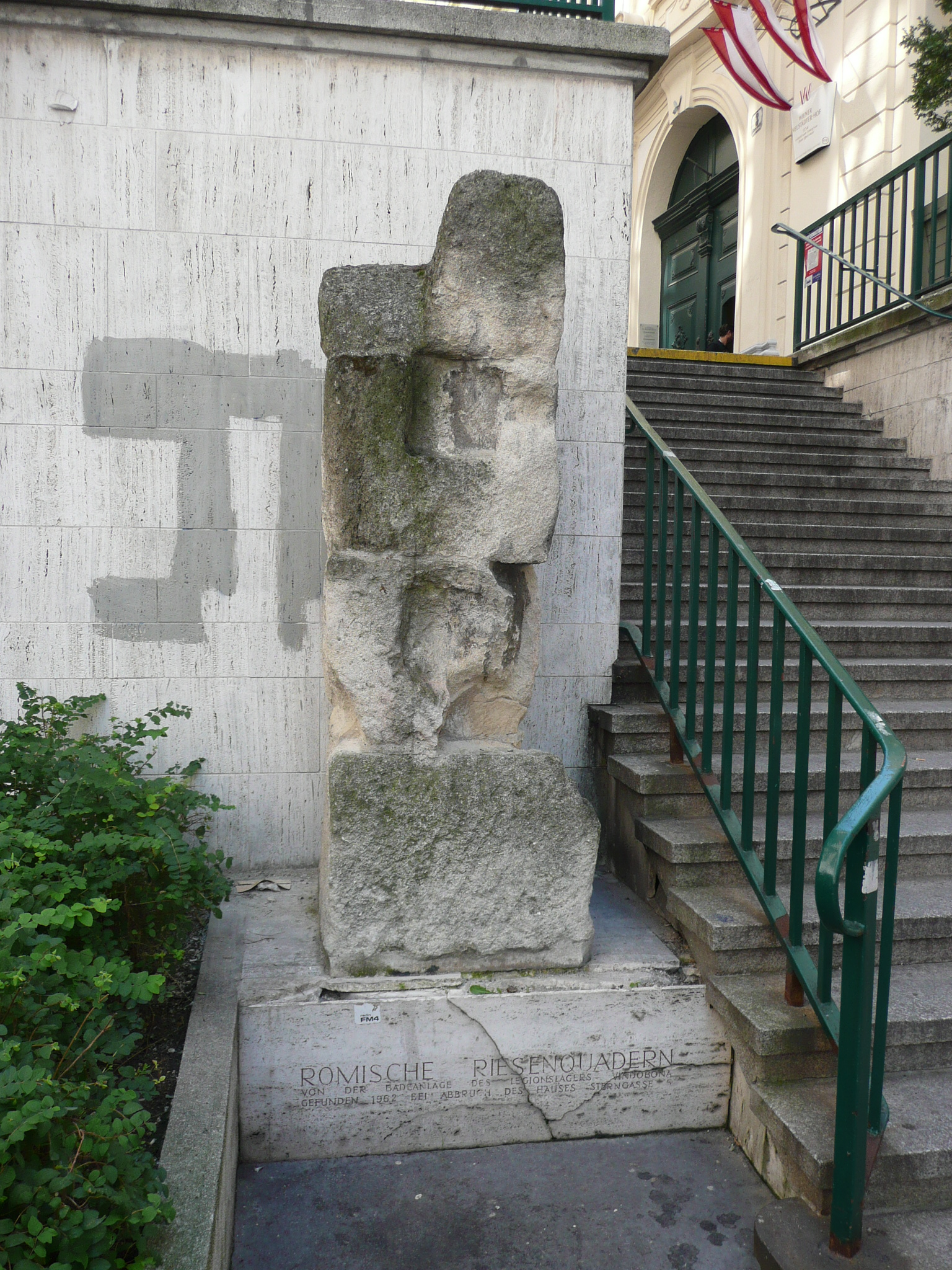
Roman stones from the thermae, at Sterngasse

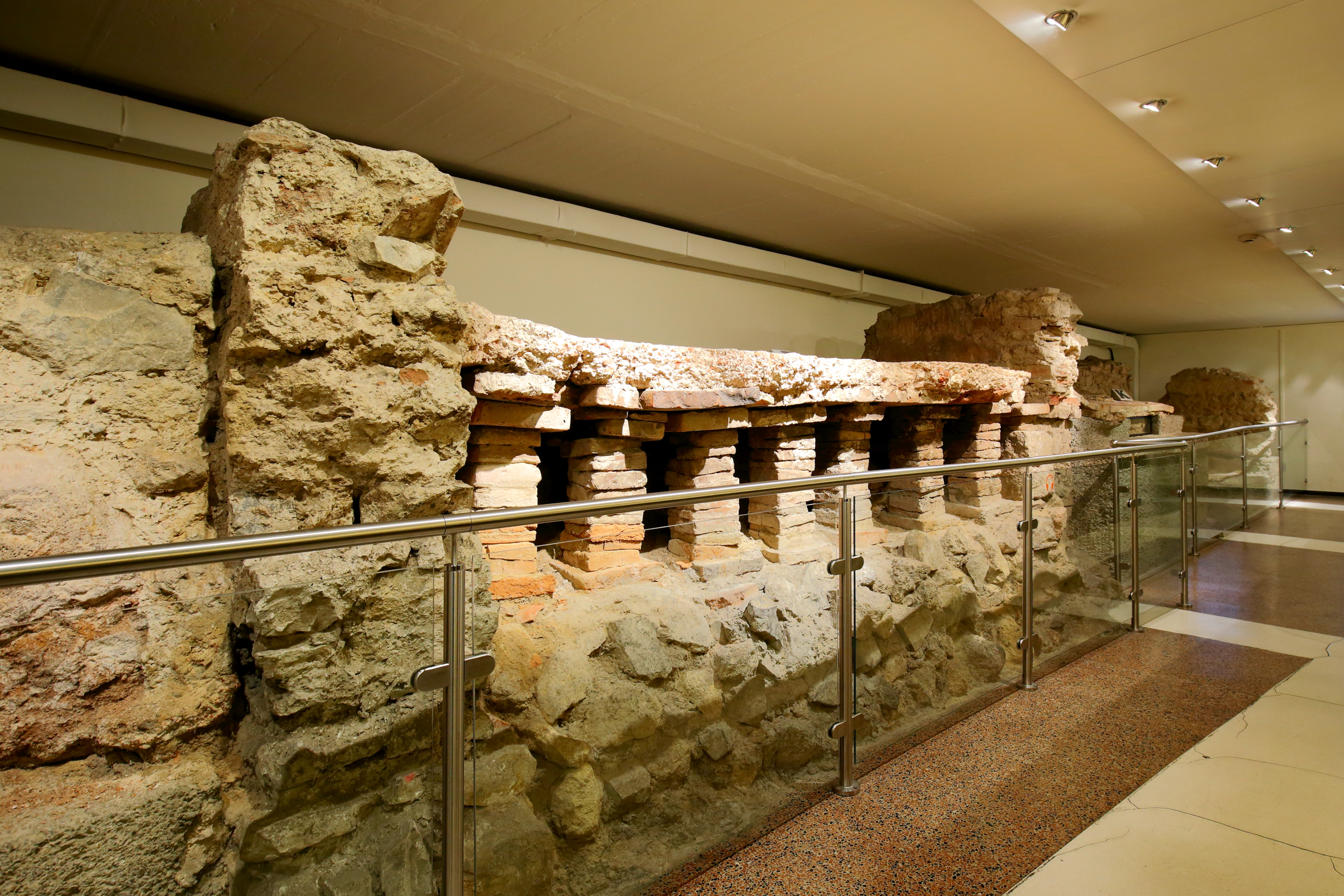
Remains of a hypocaust, found below Hoher Markt

Remains of the Roman military camp have been found at many sites in the centre of Vienna. The centre of the Michaelerplatz has been widely investigated by archaeologists. Here, traces of a Roman legionary outpost (canabae legionis) and of a crossroad have been found. The centrepiece of the current design of the square is a rectangular opening that evokes the archaeological excavations at the site and shows wall remains that have been preserved from different epochs.

Part of a Roman canal system is underneath the fire station am Hof.

Directly under the Hoher Markt are the remains of two buildings unearthed during the canalisation works of 1948/49 and made accessible to the public. After further excavation, a showroom was opened in 1961. For this purpose some of the original walls had to be removed; white marks on the floor show the spots where. The buildings, which are separated from one another by a road, housed an officer and his family. In 2008 this Roman ruins exhibit was expanded into the Museum of the Romans. Only a small portion can today be seen, for the majority of the remains are still located underneath the square and south of it.

The remains of the walls date from different phases from the 1st to the 5th century AD. The houses were typical Roman villas, with living quarters and space for working set around a middle courtyard with columned halls.

During drillings for the U5 underground line, new brick kiln and metal smelting sites were discovered that revealed further reaching suburbs of the ancient Roman settlement.

=== Evidence for the Roman military presence ===
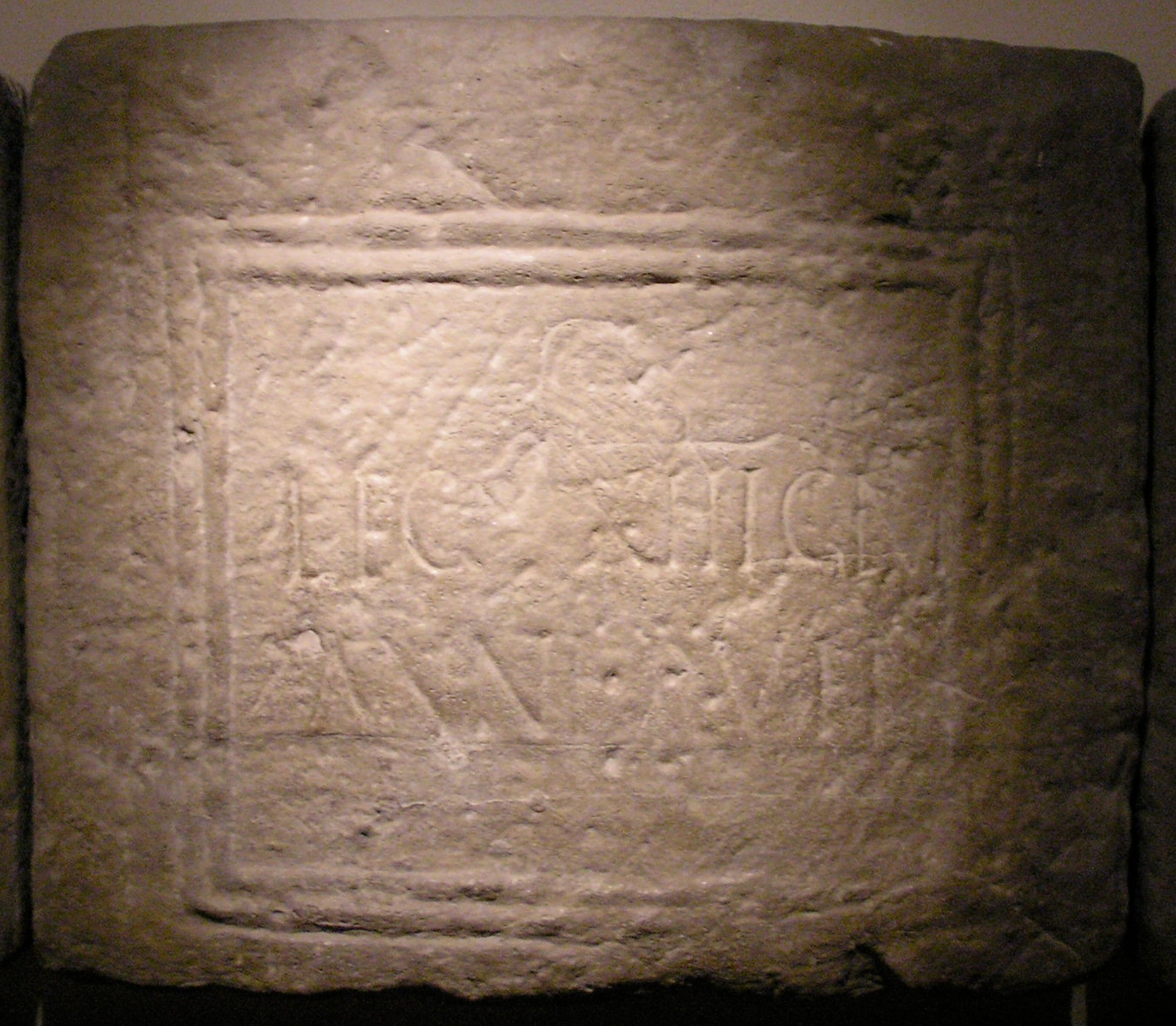
Dedication stone with inscriptions mentioning the Legio XIII Gemina

Over 3,000 stamped bricks, several stone monuments and written sources prove that several legions, cavalry units and marines were stationed in Vindobona. Around 97 AD, Legio XIII Gemina was responsible for construction of the legionary camps. Because of the wars in Dacia, they were pulled out and redeployed in 101 AD. A decade later, Legio XIIII Gemina Martia Victrix followed. Legio X Gemina from Aquincum arrived in 114 AD and remained in Vindobona until the 5th century.

About 6,000 soldiers were stationed in the Roman camp. Many of them were free from active duty during peaceful times and had other jobs. These so-called immunes were needed for the supply of goods and for the production and maintenance of weapons and commodities. They also extracted stone from quarries and wood from forests, produced bricks, and maintained the streets, bridges and the water system. Administrating the camp and ensuring its security required additional manpower.

=== Roman canals ===
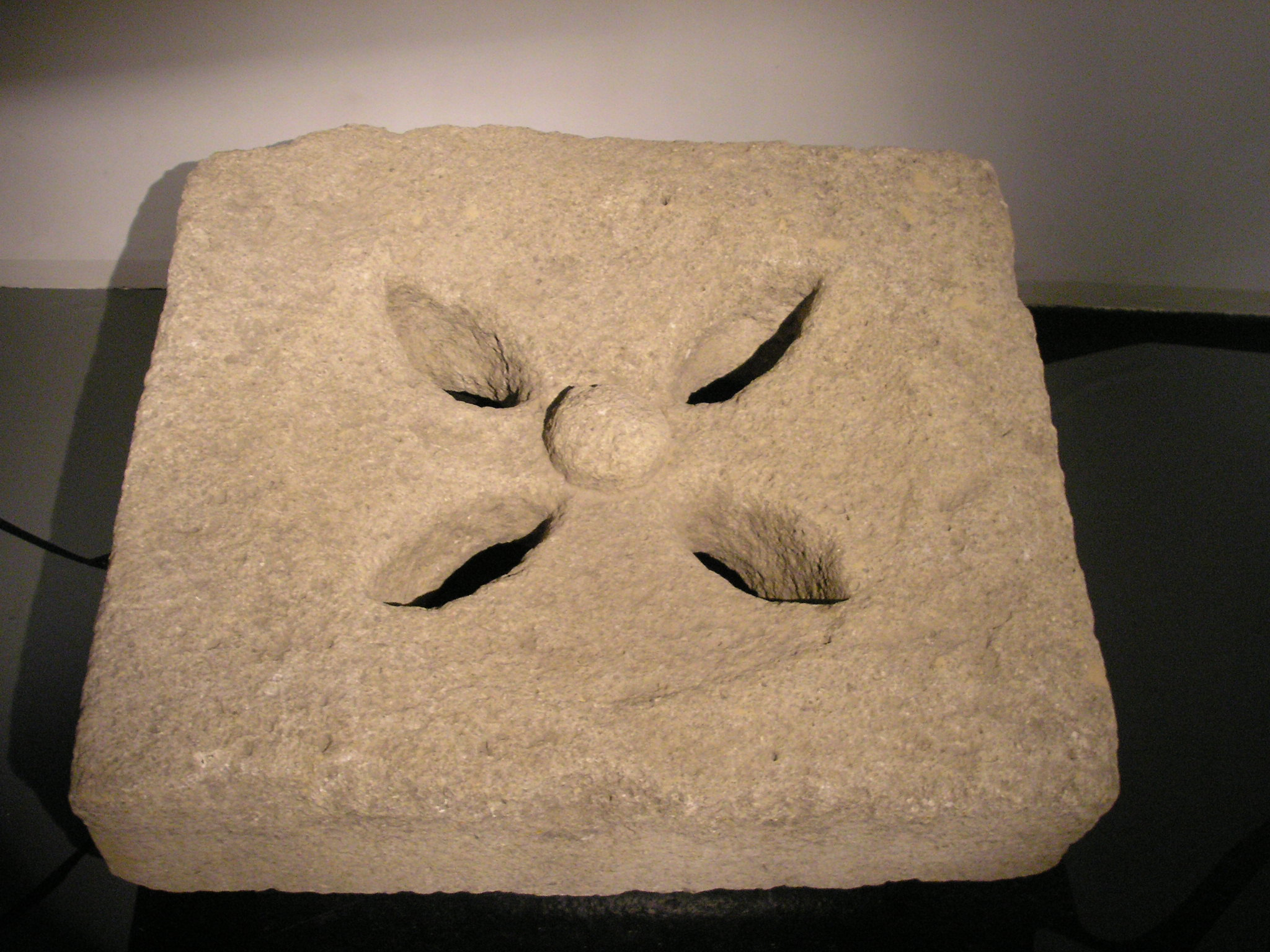
Manhole cover. Proper water supply and sanitation was vital for the functioning of the city

The Romans provided their cities, including Vindobona, with clean potable water through an elaborate systems of Roman aqueducts, canals, and large subterranean pipes. Excavations have revealed that Vindobona received its supply through a 17 km long water pipeline. The source is in the Vienna Woods around today's Kalksburg. Wells, latrines and the thermae were supplied with water. Central buildings such as the commander's office and the hospital had their own supplies, as did the settlement outside the camp, where households had their own groundwater wells.

Archaeological excavations done over the last 100 years have discovered the following Roman water supply fragment locations:

- In the Zemlinskygasse: at numbers 2-4 - (23rd district, found in 1924)
- In the Breitenfurter Straße: at number 422 - (23rd district, in 1959)
- In the Rudolf Zeller-Gasse/Anton-Krieger-Gasse - (23rd district, 1992)
- In Atzgersdorf - (23rd district, 1902–1907)
- In the Tullnertalgasse: at number 76 - (23rd district, 1973)
- In the Lainergasse: at number 1 - (23rd district, 1958)
- In the Wundtgasse - (12th district, 1951)
- In the Rosenhügelstraße: at number 88 - (12th district, 1926)
- In the Fasangartenstraße: at number 49 - (12th district, 1916)
- In the Pacassistraße - (13th district, 1928)
- In the Sechshauserstraße: at number 7 - (15th district, 1879 - leading towards the first district)

Waste from the Roman camp was transported through an elaborate subterranean sewerage system that was planned from the beginning. The sewers were lined with brick walls and plates and ran beneath the main roads. Gradients were used in such a way that the waste water descended through the canals into the River Danube. Since the canals were up to two meters deep, they could be cleaned out regularly. Large waste was probably deposed at the slope of the river. In the civilian settlement, waste was deposed in former water wells and dumps.

=== Legacies in today's streets ===
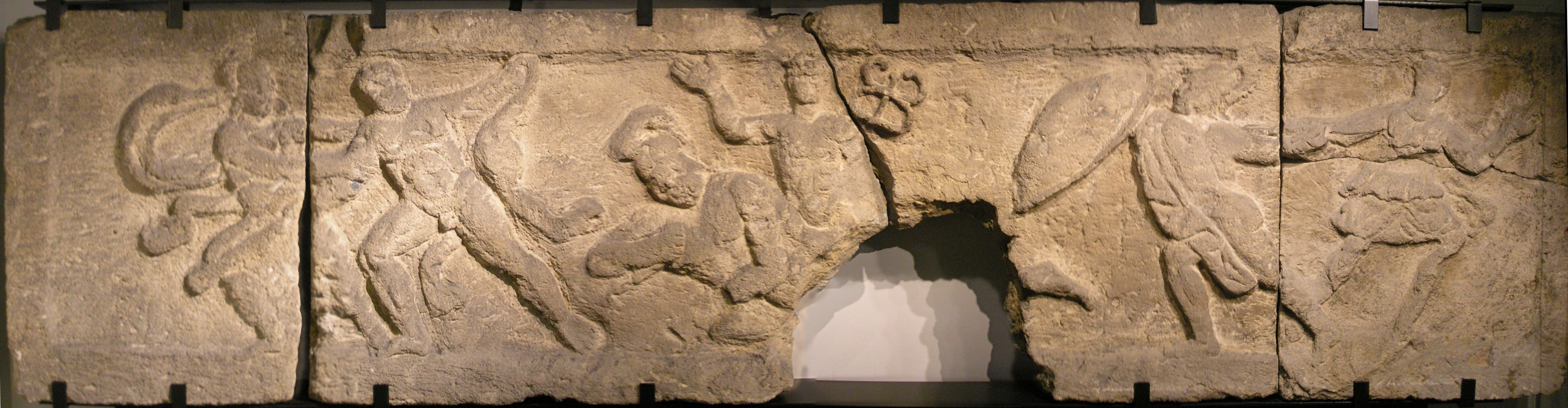
The Cygnus-Relief was probably part of a larger public building

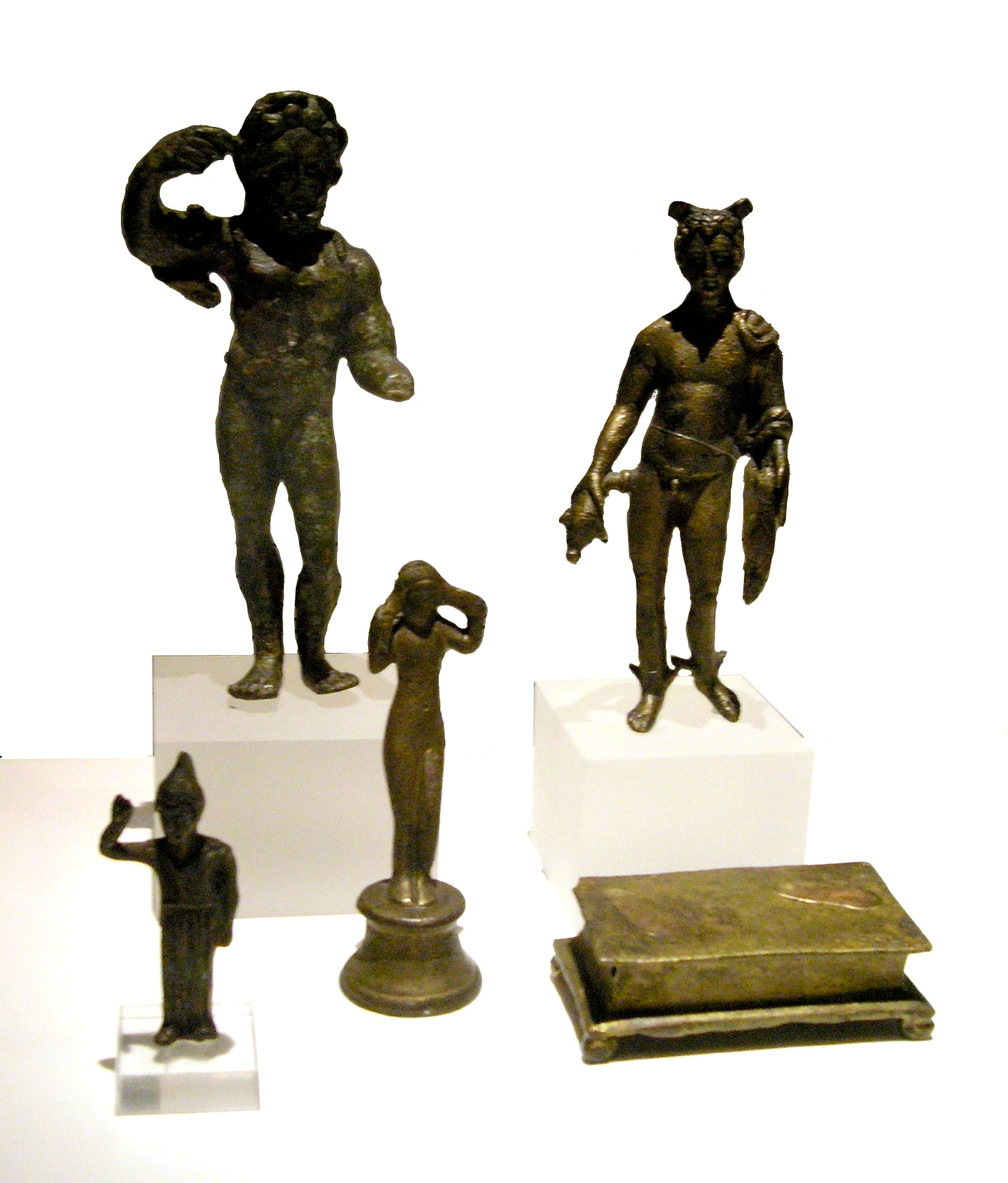
Small bronze statuettes of gods

The layout of a Roman camp (castra) was normally standardised. This has helped archaeologists to reconstruct what the camp must have looked like, despite the heavy rebuilding that has taken place in Vienna throughout the centuries. The basic contours of the camp, which was surrounded by a mighty wall with towers and three moats (today the Tiefer Graben, Naglergasse, Graben, and Rotenturmstraße) are identifiable. Along these axes, main roads connected the gates with one other. The main buildings were the commander's headquarters, the Palace of the Legate, the houses of the staff officers, and the thermae. At right angles to these, the soldiers' accommodation, a hospital, workshops, and mews (stables) were constructed.

== In popular culture ==
- In the American film Gladiator (2000), lead character Maximus (Russell Crowe) fights in the battle of Vindobona under the order of Marcus Aurelius (Richard Harris). There are also two lines that make reference to Vindobona. In one, Maximus's servant, Cicero, trying to get the attention of Lucilla, states, "I served your father at Vindobona!" In the other, Maximus asks if anyone in his group of gladiators has served in the army, to which an anonymous fighter responds, "I served with you at Vindobona."
- The historical novel Votan by Welsh writer John James begins in "Vindabonum" and imagines 2nd century AD life there.

== Legacy ==
The train connecting Prague and Vienna, currently operated by Czech Railways and OBB using Railjet trainsets is called Vindobona. The Willem C. Vis Moot competition always has its fictional seat of international arbitration in Vindobona since the primary competition always occurs in Vienna.

== See also ==
- List of aqueducts in the Roman Empire
- List of Roman sites
- Roman theatre of Lillebonne
