= Umbau-Wagen =

Railway coach

Three-axle Umbauwagen
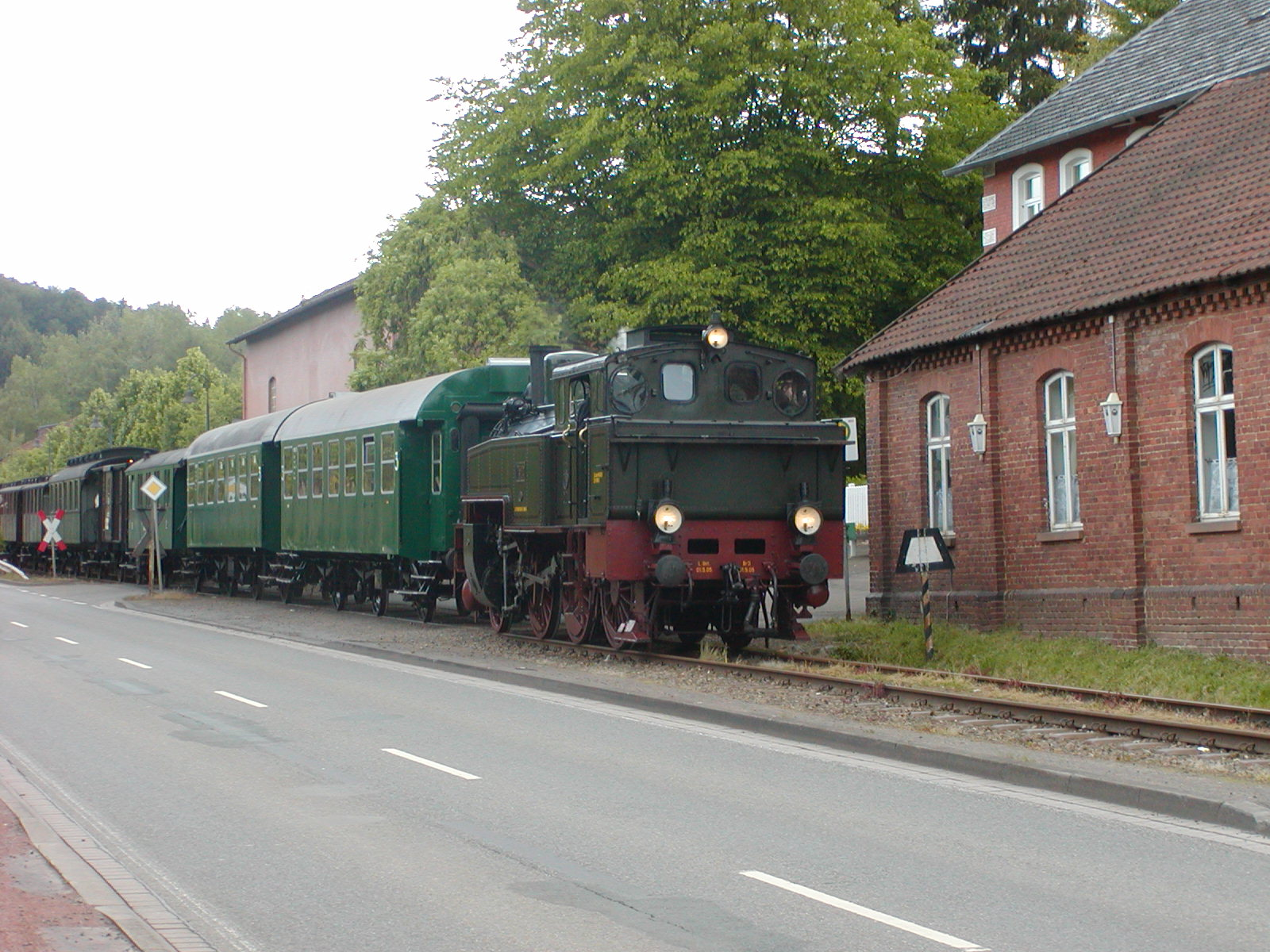
- Two DB three-axle Umbauwagen
- Manufacturers: AW Hannover, AW Karlsruhe, AW Ludwigshafen, AW Saarbrücken, AW Limburg, AW München-Neuaubing
- Constructed: 1953–1959
- Number built: 6582
- Fleet numbers: AB3yg: 37001–38119; B3yg: 85801–90537; BD3yg: 99201–99926

Specifications
- Car length: 13,300 mm (43 ft 7 5/8 in) over buffers
- Width: 3,090 mm (10 ft 1 5/8 in)
- Height: 4,045 mm (13 ft 3 1/4 in)
- Wheelbase: 7,500–7,900 mm (24 ft 7 1/4 in – 25 ft 11 in)
- Maximum speed: 85 km/h (53 mph), later 90 or 100 km/h (56 or 62 mph)
- Weight: AB3yg: 18.3 t (18.0 long tons; 20.2 short tons); B3yg: 18.0 t (17.7 long tons; 19.8 short tons); BD3yg: 17.7 t (17.4 long tons; 19.5 short tons)
- Seating: AB3yg: 24 first + 24 second; B3yg: 62 second; BD3yg: 24 second
- Track gauge: 1,435 mm (4 ft 8 1/2 in)

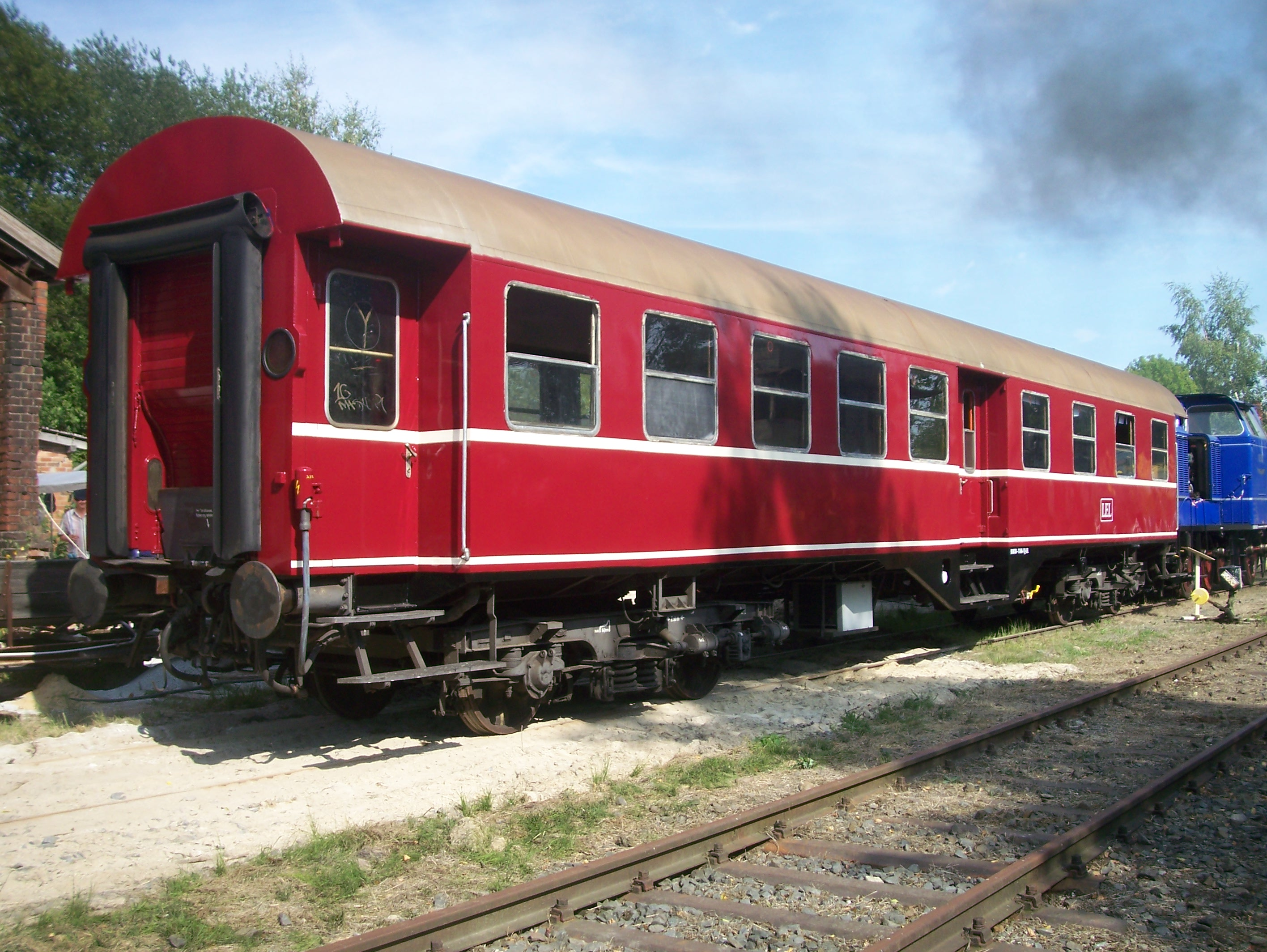
Umbauwagen of the original Class AB4yg. (painted red in the style of the ET 65)

The Umbau-Wagen or Umbauwagen was a type of German railway passenger coach operated by the Deutsche Bundesbahn (DB) which appeared in the mid-1950s. The name means "rebuild coach" and they were made by rebuilding or converting former state railway (Länderbahn) compartment coaches, many of which were over 30 years old.

== Origins ==
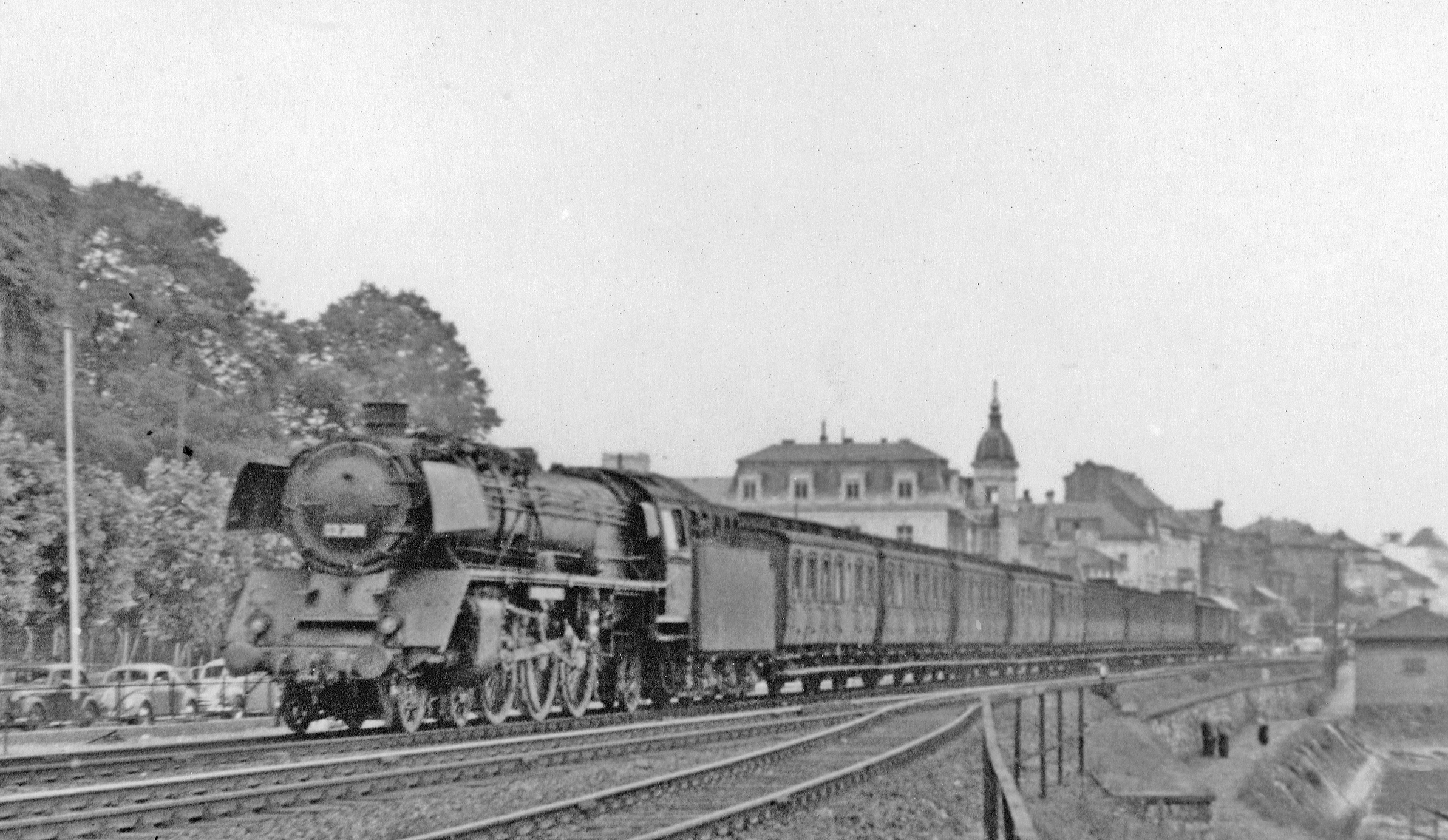
DRG Class 03 locomotive with a rake of Prussian three-axle non-corridor compartment carriages in 1954; the chasses of these cars would be used as the basis of the Umbauwagens.

After the Second World War, the DB, like the Deutsche Reichsbahn (DR) in East Germany, had a serious deficit of stock as well as a very aged fleet of coaches, a situation which lasted into the 1960s. In the 1950s the bulk of the fleet for local and Eilzug (semi-fast) trains was still made up of 22,345 four-, six- and eight-wheeled compartment and open coaches of the former Prussian and Bavarian classes from the period before and after the First World War. The few city coaches bought for Eilzug services at the beginning of the 1950s were nowhere near enough to replace and modernise the very outdated stock of passenger coaches and which was also costing considerably more to maintain. The levels of steel production and that of other raw materials of the newly formed Federal Republic did not permit a full replacement of the fleet in those days. Like the DR in the 1960s the DB was forced as early as 1953 to carry out a modernisation of pre-war coaches - plainly and simply called an Umbau or rebuild.

== Six-wheeled coach, Class 3yg(e) ==
In summer 1953, the Bundesbahn Head Office tasked the Bundesbahn Central Office (Bundesbahn-Zentralamt or BZA) in Minden together with various coach building firms with designing a rebuild of the pre-war coaches, of which only the wheels and the undercarriage were to be used. The coach body was to be replaced by a completely new one.

In 1953 the workshop (Ausbesserungswerk or AW) at Ludwigshafen built the first trials coach from an old Länderbahn wagon. In January 1954 the coach went into full production at the shops in Hanover, Karlsruhe and Limburg an der Lahn. From these wooden-bodied compartment coaches only the underbody (which was rebuilt to a common length of 13 metres), the running gear and the brake system was used. Four-wheeled coaches were given a third, centre axle and the wheelbase varied on individual coaches, depending on their original design, between 7,500 and 7,900 millimetres. The centre axle was given side-play in order to achieve good curve running qualities. The rebuilds were derived from four- and six-wheeled Länderbahn coaches as well as pre-war Reichsbahn stock.

A corrugated steel floor (Wellblechboden) was eventually welded onto the old running gear. Apart from that a new steel coach body was manufactured, which extended as far as the buffer beam and was 3.2 metres wide. The doors at each end of the coach, designed as pivoting external doors, were inset towards the centre line of the coach. The windows were of the sliding window type, but they were not the same as the UIC standard design. One window section was reserved for the WC.

The interior accommodation of the third class coach had plastic, cushioned seats. In second class, the seats were arranged in a 2+2 configuration and covered with fabric. Between the seating compartments was a small vestibule. All the coaches had steam heating equipment, the majority were also fitted with electric heating (this can be told from the suffix "e" in their class designation).

Three coach classes were produced. The third class coaches (C3yg(e)) had seven windows per side and 66 seats arranged in a 2+3 configuration. The mixed 2nd/3rd class BC3yg(e) had 20 third class seats and 18 second class seats. There was also a semi-luggage coach CPw3yg(e) with 26 seats and a luggage section.

As a result of class changes in the 1956 summer timetable the coaches were regraded, resulting in B3yg(e), AB3yg(e) and BD3yg(e) units. As early as 1954 more than a thousand coaches had been placed in service. By 1958 the number grew to 6,500 units, or 25 per cent of the entire coach fleet in the Bundesbahn. Their permitted top speed was initially 90 km/h, which was then the standard for passenger trains; in the 1970s this was raised on several coaches to 100 km/h.

The electrical system on the 3yg(e) coaches only permitted close-coupled pairs to be formed, albeit any combination was allowed apart from BD3yg + BD3yg. The permitted combinations were: AB + AB, AB + B, B + B, AB + BD, B + BD. The only requirement was that the close-coupled ends had to face one another. So the six-wheeled Umbauwagen coaches always ran in pairs. Numerous coaches were also equipped with a control cable for use in push-pull trains; this was indicated by adding the secondary suffix "b" (AB3ygeb etc.). Their use in push-pull trains was usually in combination with Silberling (e.g. BDnf) or centre door (BDymf) driving coaches, because no Umbau driving coaches were ever procured.

These coaches were deployed in local passenger trains on main and branch lines. Not until the middle of the 1980s were the last coaches, which served commuter traffic at the BASF factory in Ludwigshafen am Rhein, taken out of service. Several have survived to the present day as construction train units. Other coaches may be found in the ownership of museum railways.

== Eight-wheeled coach, Class 4yg ==
Four-axle Umbauwagen
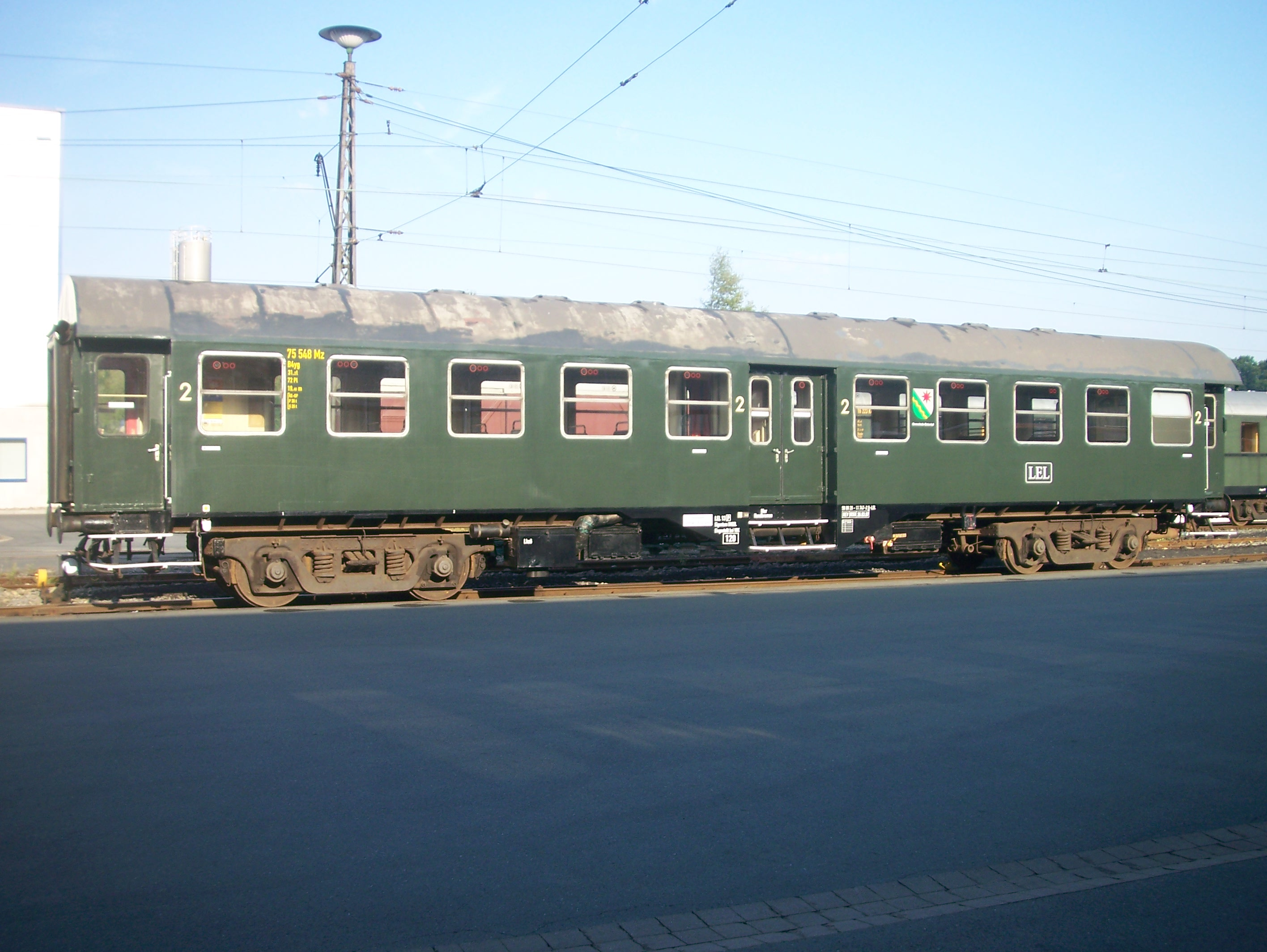
- Umbauwagen of class B4yg, the Lippe State Railway
- Manufacturers: AW Hannover, AW Karlsruhe, AW München-Neuaubing
- Constructed: 1955–1961
- Number built: 1821

Specifications
- Car length: 19,460 mm (63 ft 10 1/8 in) over buffers
- Width: 2,990 mm (9 ft 9 3/4 in)
- Height: 4,045–4,062 mm (13 ft 3 1/4 in – 13 ft 3 7/8 in)
- Maximum speed: 120 km/h (75 mph)
- Weight: AB4yg: 28.4 t (28.0 long tons; 31.3 short tons); B4yg: 28.6–31.2 t (28.1–30.7 long tons; 31.5–34.4 short tons); BD4yg: 30.5 t (30.0 long tons; 33.6 short tons)
- Seating: AB4yg: 24 first + 36 second; B4yg: 72 second; BD4yg: 36 second
- Track gauge: 1,435 mm (4 ft 8 1/2 in)

Following the success of the six-wheeled Umbauwagen, the DB intended that the large numbers of eight-wheeled compartment coaches from the early Länderbahn fleets which were still available, should be converted on the same principles. To achieve this the undercarriages of the old coaches were converted to a standard length. In 1956 a trials coach was built - a mixed class BC4yg, which had a length of 19.5 metres. In 1957 two more prototypes of the later class AByg 402 already had Minden-Deutz bogies. The end doors and the special design was the same as the six-wheelers. There were also three classes: B4yg, AB4yg and BD4yg.

Between the inset end doors were five windows (four in the first class section) and then a pair of pivoting external doors as a centre entrance, which was also inset.

Full production began in 1957 with the B4yg-56 (Byg 515). The following series in 1959 were classed as the B4yg 58 and Byg 58a (later Byg 515 and 516). The coaches had 72 passenger cushioned, plastic-covered seats. The AB coaches were fitted with 24 first class and 36 second class seats and were built from 1958. They had a somewhat different floor plan with various locations for the WCs. These coaches were called the AByg-58 and AByg-58a (later AByg 503 and 504). The half-luggage vans were initially supplied as BPw4yg-56 (later BDyg 531). Further batches went into service as the BPw4yg-56a (BDyg 532) and BPw4yg-56b (BDyg 533).

The basis of the first coaches even included those with Prussian standard bogies, although these were converted from friction bearings to roller bearings. The next 300 coaches were given the originally American Schwanenhals bogies, an amazing parallel with the 1964 eight-wheeled Reko-Wagen coaches of the Reichsbahn in East Germany. All the remaining yg class coaches were then equipped with Minden-Deutz MD 36 bogies. All the coaches were cleared to run at up to 120 km/h.

The 4yg coaches were preferred for semi-fast services (Eilzugverkehr). Not until their later years were they cascaded to branch lines. The last coaches were retired in the early 1990s, because it was no longer worthwhile converting the doors to automatic locking. The last areas of operation for these coaches were the Lahntal railway (Lahntalbahn), the Cologne area and the Eifel. The coaches experienced one final highlight during the Wende, the period after the Berlin Wall came down in 1989/90, when they were used in a large number of extra express trains.

It is of note that these coaches ran their entire lives in the bottle green or chromium-oxide green livery typical of the DB for the 1950s and 60s and were neither painted in ocean blue and beige nor in other colours (apart from e.g. those used with Class ET 65 multiples in Stuttgart suburban services − see below).

== Trailer coaches ==
Several Umbauwagen ended up in the Tegernsee-Bahn for use in Eilzüge from Munich to Tegernsee. Some of the 3yge coaches were painted in red, the DB's standard colour for traction units, as trailer cars for ET 85 multiples and designated as EB 85 and 885. Some 4yg coaches were redesignated as Class EB 65 and 865 as trailers in Stuttgart suburban services coupled with ET 65 and 465 multiples.

A special type of Umbauwagen was the prisoner transport coach of Class Z 56, which was developed along the lines of the 3yg, but with only four-wheels. Six coaches of this type were built (numbers 10 061 to 10 066). The coaches had 15 cells with 36 seats and an office for the guards. The coaches were retired in 1963 after the Federal Constitutional Court (Bundesverfassungsgericht) declared that the prisoner transport between prisons by rail was contrary to the constitution. At least 3 of the coaches were converted into a department vehicle.

== Sources ==
- Weigert/Gress: Umbau- und Rekowagen von der DB und DR, Eisenbahnkurier Special 82, EK Freiburg.
