= Eilzugwagen =

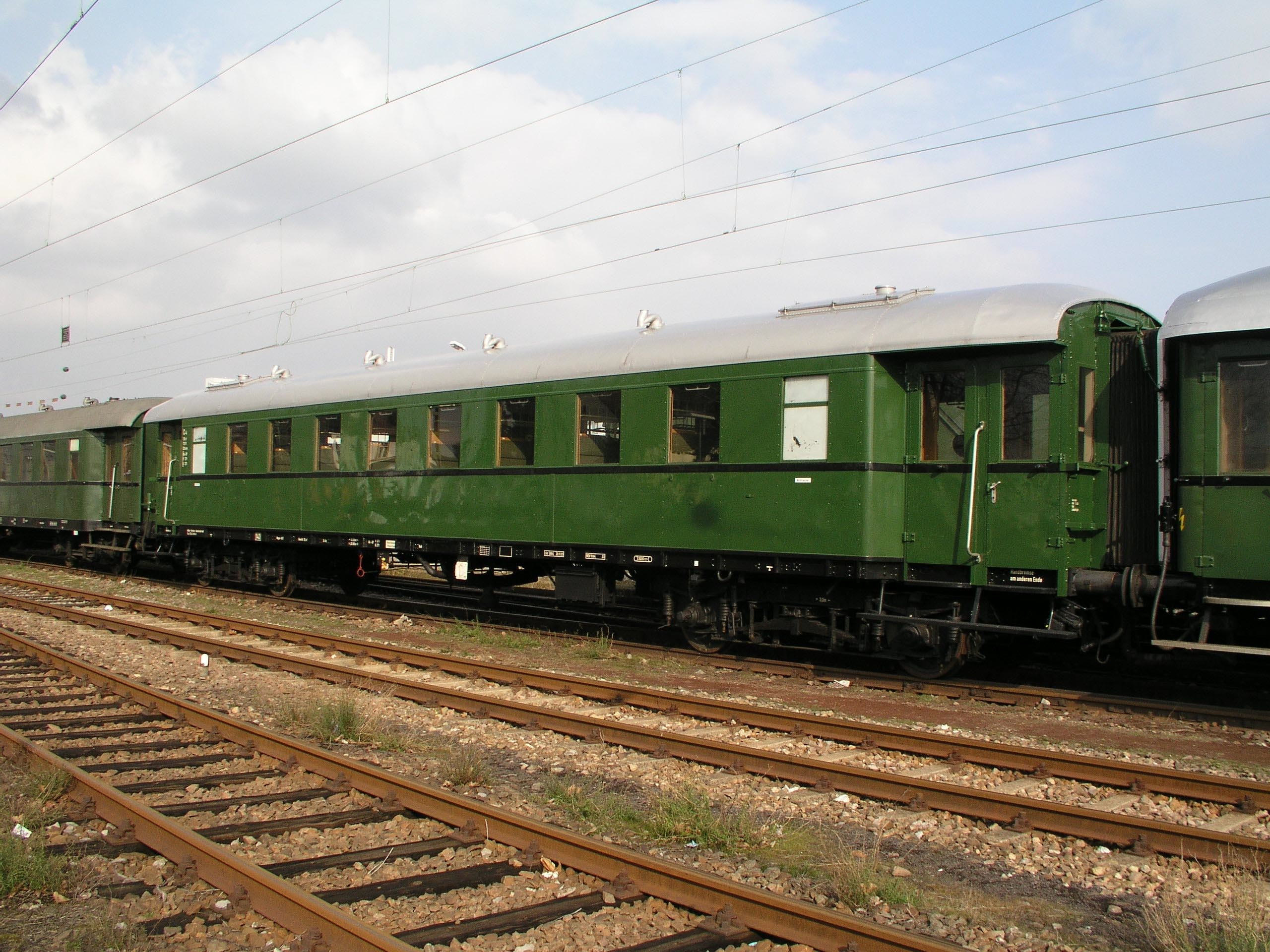

The Eilzugwagen was a type of railway passenger coach (US: passenger car) specially developed for German semi-fast (or fast stopping) trains, known as Eilzüge. These coaches were first built in the 1930s and continued to be produced until the 1950s. Today all coaches of this type have been retired. A number still run on museum railways.

== General ==
Eilzüge first ran in Germany in 1907. These were express trains (Schnellzüge), that did not switch to hauling the new through coaches, but stayed with the conventional, eight-wheeled compartment coaches common at that time. Not until the end of the 1920s did the Deutsche Reichsbahn consider developing special wagons as eight-wheeled open coaches for the semi-fast train class.

== Coaches ==
=== Type E 30 ===
Following the construction of trials coaches in 1928 and 1929, the full production of 150 Eilzugwagen began in 1930; 2nd and 2nd/3rd class variants being turned out. The full designation of these coaches was B4i-30 (later Ayse 604) and BC4i-30 (later Abyse 617). Other, 3rd class only, coaches entered service as C4i-30 (later Bye 655). They were classified as Type (Verwendungsgruppe) E 30.

These coaches were of rivetted construction in accordance with the standards of the time. They had an open 3rd class section with a centre aisle and 2+3 seating arrangement, and four 2nd class compartments each with six seats. As on express coaches, the entrances were inset, but the roof was of basket arch design at the coach ends, as on the Class 28 Rheingold Express coaches. The entrances at the ends of each coach had double doors for 3rd class and a single swing door for 2nd class. By each of the entrance ways was a toilet with a wash basin. The windows were 800 mm (2.6 ft) wide in 3rd class and 1 m (3.3 ft) wide in 2nd class.

The coaches had Görlitz Type II (light) bogies. The gangways were open and only secured with folding lattice gates (Scherengitter), so there was no protection from the elements.

=== Type E 36 ===
In 1935 development started on a successor to the E 30. The main difference was the welded coach body. In addition an extra half-compartment was added because the coach, at 20 m long, had more space than its predecessor. To enable a better view the bottom edge of the windows was lowered and the panes enlarged. Other features, like the open gangways and Görlitz bogies, were identical to those of the E 30. Only C4i-36 and BC4i-37 coach variants were placed in service because, unlike its predecessor, the E 30, no more pure 2nd class coaches were ordered. Later these coaches were reclassified as Bye 667 and Abyse 630 by the DB.

=== Type E 42 ===
From the Schürzenwagen series of coaches, a semi-fast, Eilzug, variant was developed. In important details it was the same as the previous class, the E 36. However the coach body was now streamlined (by tapering the ends) and had panels or 'skirts' covering the sole bars. These even covered the new Reichsbahn-standard bogies which were very similar to the Minden-Deutz bogies later used by the DB. For the first time in the Deutsche Reichsbahn, Eilzugwagen were given gangways protected by folding bellows (Faltenbalge). As a result, they could be used, if need be, in express trains because from now on passengers could pass from one coach to another. Nevertheless, the open layout was retained, as on the E 30 and E 36 coaches - as were the inset double doors at the ends of the coaches of what was now the 2nd class section. The 1st class section just had a simple swing door at the end of the coach. However the half-compartment in the centre of the wagon was omitted.

Two prototypes with 2nd and 3rd class seating were delivered by LHW to the Reichsbahn at Breslau in 1939: the BC4üp-39 (later the AByse 631) built to a very light structural design. This meant that they were particularly suitable for use on hilly routes. The interior of the 3rd class area was—as was de rigueur at that time—fitted with wooden seats; 2nd class sections were given soft, fabric-covered seats. In all, according to plans at that time, 8,550 coaches of this type were to be bought in order to finally get rid of the old, eight-wheeled, compartment coaches. 650 were to be built as ABüp, the rest as C4üp.

To achieve this, head office drew up a four-year plan. However, due to the shortage of raw materials during the Second World War, only 125 composite (AB) coaches were ordered, of which by 1944 only 45 could be delivered: the BC4üp-42a (later Abyse 633). 17 units ended up in the Deutsche Bundesbahn (DB). Of the 3rd class coaches, the C4üp-42a, 100 units were delivered. The 40 that were left to the DB were later classed as Bye 669. Another 250 Eilzügwagen of type C4üp-43a were delivered, but they were used as ambulance coaches until the end of the war. These were later classified as Bye 670 where they ended up in the DB fleet.

Before their interior could be fitted out, several of these coaches were used as so-called Stehwagen (static coaches) until the founding of the Bundesbahn.

=== Modernisation ===
When the passenger classes were restructured in 1956, BC coaches became ABs and C coaches became Bs. In 2nd class the same soft seats were fitted as in the E-30 and E-36 types. Coaches left behind in Austria after the war were, like all pre-war Reichsbahn coaches, upgraded and modernised during the 1960s with UIC sliding windows and new cushioned seats.

From 1955 to 1960 all pre-war Eilzugwagen in the DB were refurbished and modernised. Instead of wooden seats, they were fitted with cushioned seats with imitation leather covers and the seats were arranged in a 2+2 configuration. The light bulbs were largely replaced by fluorescent strip lights. The coaches so converted were eventually classed as Ayse, AByse and Bye with code numbers in the 600 series.

Almost all these semi-fast coaches were used until the 1970s in their designated role; only then did many end up on local passenger services. Whilst the DB coaches remained in service until 1984, those left in the DR were rebuilt in the 1960s, like the other DR Schürzenwagen, into the so-called 'modernised coaches' (Modernisierungswagen).

== yl-coaches ==
=== Classes ===
From 1951 the DB acquired new coaches for semi-fast services called Städtewagen or city coaches. These were the first coaches in the DB to be built to the new UIC template for X class coaches and had a standard length of 26.4 m. These coaches had, in addition to the end doors, a double door in the middle. The doors were of the swing door type. Like the UIC express coaches they were of welded, all-steel construction and were equipped with the rubber corridor connectors commonly used today.

Minden-Deutz bogies were fitted. On these coaches the 2nd class (1st class after the 1956 reform) areas were open plan. By the entrance ways at each end of the coach was a toilet. The coaches were fitted for both steam and electric heating and were rated at up to 120 km/h.

The following variants were procured: C4ymg-51 (later Bylb 421), BC4yg (later ABylb 411), CPwymg-51, a large number of which were fitted with driver's cabs for push-pull operations and designated as CPwygmf (later BDylbf 456). The driver's cab end of the coach had an inset entrance located one compartment-length from the end to make room for the cab.

These coaches were joined by four luggage/buffet cars of class CRrymg-54 (later BRyl 446) and prototypes of 1st class open coaches, the Aymg-52, later reclassified as Ayl 401. The code letter b was only given to coaches with control wiring, their classification until 1975 being …ym(b).

=== Employment ===
Following their delivery the new coaches were initially used in light express trains. Only after the 1956 class reform, when 3rd class was upgraded to 2nd class and 2nd to 1st were the Städtewagen placed in their intended role. In their early years, the driving cars had been used with six-wheeled Umbauwagen (rebuild coaches) on suburban services in conurbations like Hamburg. Later on, with the delivery of new Silberling local train coaches from 1959, the driving car was used with those as well. In the 1980s the control equipment on all these coaches was removed.

In the 1970s and 80s the Städtewagen were also used in conventional local passenger trains, especially from 1982 on the conversion of many district Eilzüge to supplement-free express trains and on the retirement of pre-war coaches.

The last yl coaches were retired from the DB in 1990, because they wanted to avoid having to fit them for central locking which would have been expensive. Several coaches have ended up, however, via a third party in the DR and were employed in Berlin suburban services including Berlin-Lichtenberg to Nauen and Falkensee.

After their retirement, several yl coaches were used as centre cars in testing the new InterCityExpress driving cars.

== Preserved ==
Many pre-war and post-war semi-fast coaches have been preserved. For example, the Ulm Railway Society at Ettlingen runs several pre-war Eilzugwagen. Others belong to the Traditions-Eilzug Zwickau.

Several post-war Eilzug coaches, including a driving car, also still exist. The BSW Lübeck looks after two coaches belonging to the Nuremberg Transport Museum. Several yl coaches are also operational with the Bavarian Railway Museum at Nördlingen.

== Technical data for yl coaches ==
- Length over buffers: 26.40 m (86 ft 7 in)
- Width of coach body: 2.82 m (9 ft 3 in)
- Overall height: 4.05 m (13 ft 3 in)
- Bogie pivot pitch: 19.00 m (62 ft 4 in)
- Bogie wheelbase: 2.50 m (8 ft 2 in)
- Total weight: 35 to 39 t (34 to 38 long tons; 39 to 43 short tons)
- Bogie type: Minden-Deutz
- Top speed: 120 km/h (75 mph)
- Heating: electrical and steam
