= Vestibuled train =

Type of passenger train

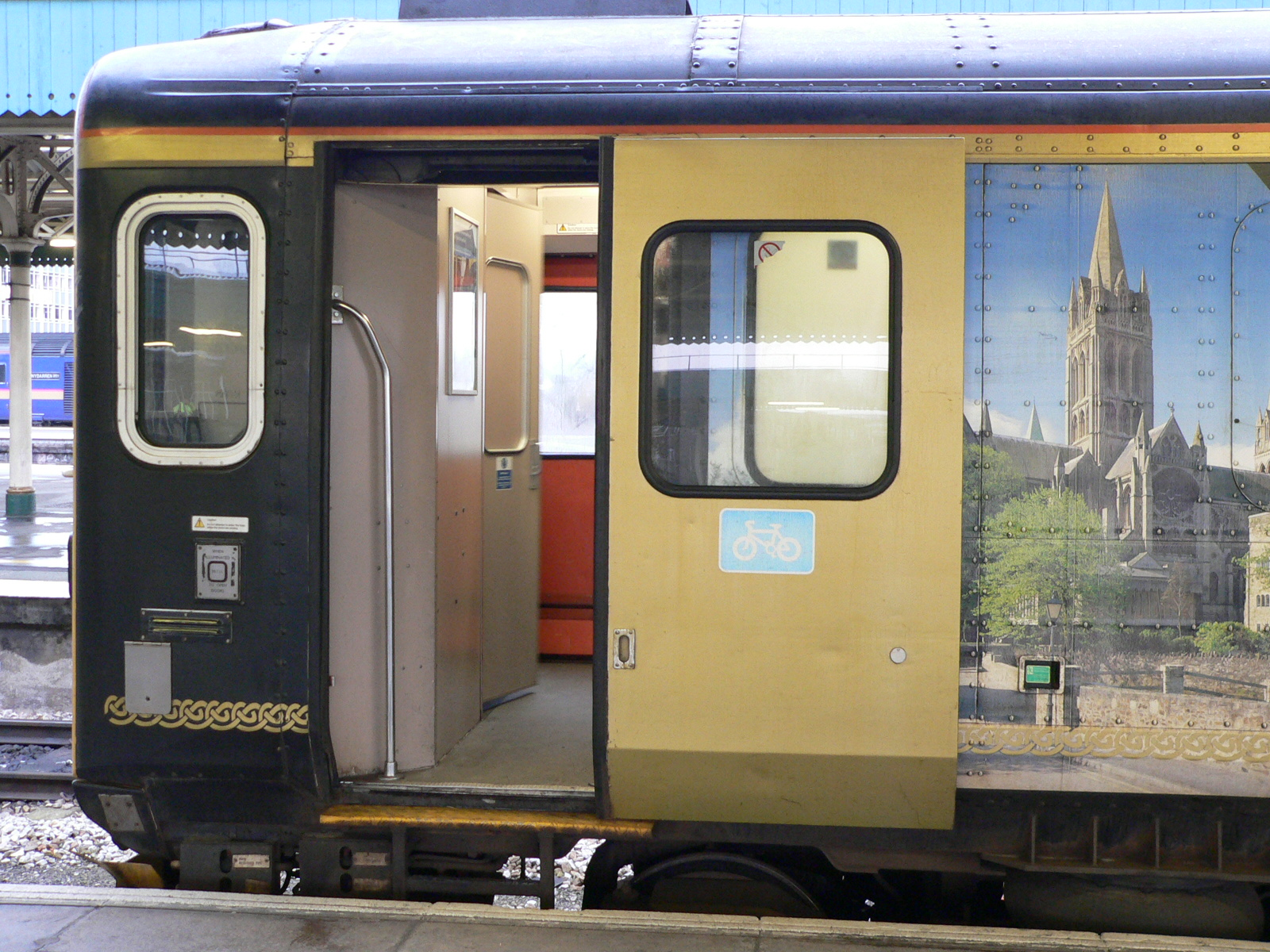
Wessex Trains 153302

A vestibuled train is a passenger train on which passenger cars have enclosed vestibules at their ends, in contrast to the open platforms on early cars. Typically, a vestibule has doorways on either side to allow passenger entry and exit at stations, a door into the body of the car, and, at the end, a doorway allowing access to the next car, via a flexible gangway connection.

== History ==
The first vestibuled train was introduced on June 15, 1887, on the inaugural run of the Pennsylvania Limited of the Pennsylvania Railroad, forerunner of the famous Broadway Limited.

As a concept, the railway car vestibule had been tried in various primitive forms during the latter part of the 19th century, but the first viable form was invented by H. H. Sessions and his staff at the Pullman Car Works in Chicago. Sessions' patent was challenged by others and reduced in litigation to the spring mechanism of his vestibule design. Further litigation by Pullman was successful in modifying the earlier rulings.

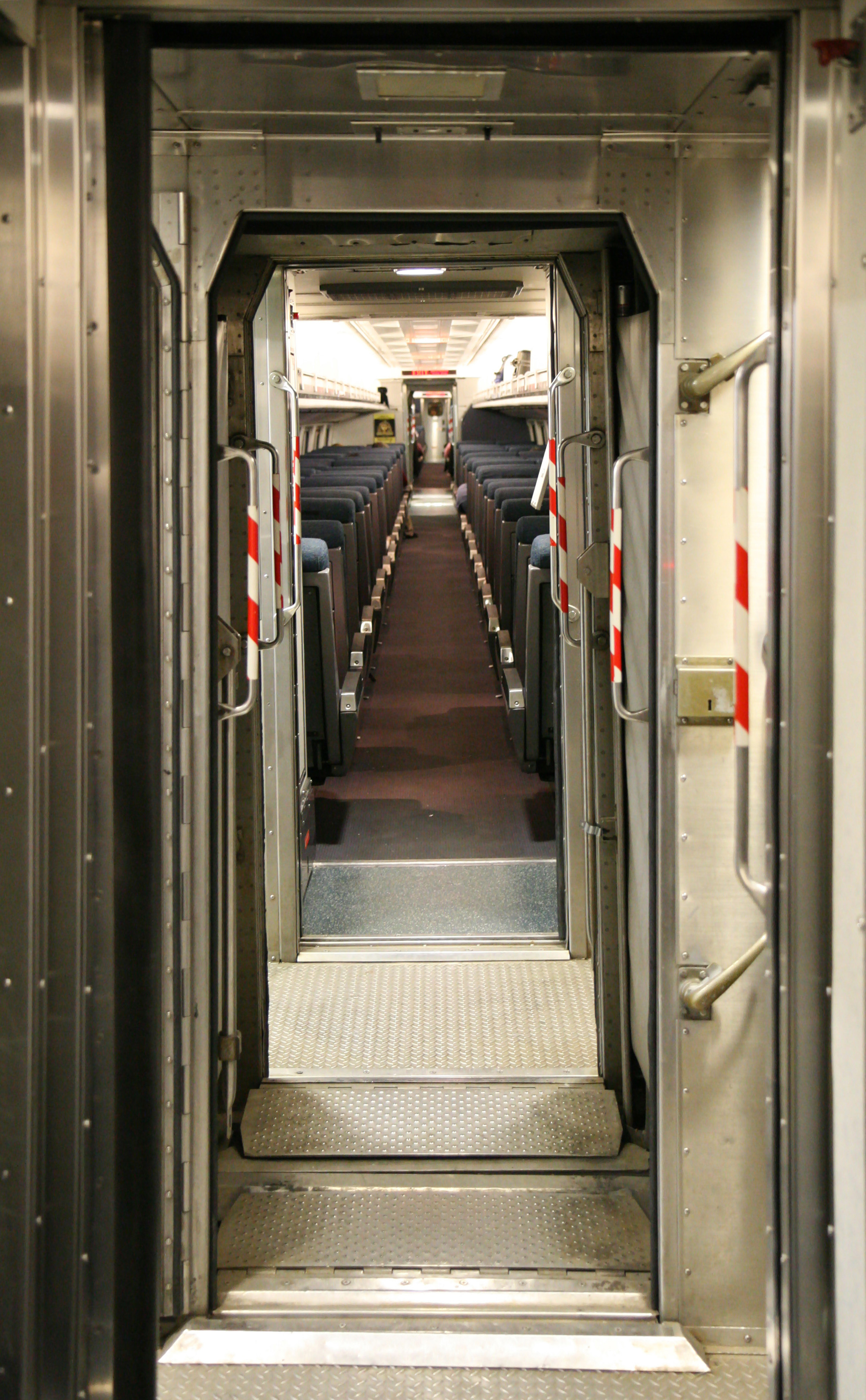
Amtrak regional train vestibule, 2007

Prior to the development of vestibules, passage between cars when a train was underway was both unpleasant and dangerous, involving stepping over a shifting plate between swaying cars, exposed to the weather, with no safety barrier on either side except for chain guard-rails, and with soot, cinders and fly ash raining down from the exhaust of the steam locomotive.

Because passengers were generally confined to a single car during a journey, trains had regular meal stops built into their schedules, and sleeping cars were uncommon. The introduction of vestibule connections on trains in the late nineteenth century allowed the inclusion of dining cars, lounge cars, and other specialized vehicles.

"During the 1880s and 1890s, the slogan "Vestibuled Train" was a magic term to railroad publicity departments everywhere. More importantly, this development brought into existence the "train" in the sense we know it today—no longer a series of cars coupled together and pulling together, but a continuous unit for human uses. ... A whole new way of thinking about rail travel developed. You could eat and sleep on trains and [arrive] in a fraction of the previous time."

Vestibuled cars allowed the development of luxury trains during the golden age of rail travel, involving trains such as the Union Pacific's Overland Limited (1890), the Pennsylvania Railroad's Pennsylvania Limited (later renamed the Pennsylvania Special, then the Broadway Limited), and the New York Central's 20th Century Limited (1902). The Southern's Crescent was introduced in 1891 as the Washington and Southwestern Vestibuled Limited, and widely known as The Vestibule because it was the first all-year train south of Washington equipped with vestibule connections.

== See also ==
- Aisle
- Compartment coach
- Corridor coach
- Gangway connection
- Open coach
