= Running board =

Step fitted under doors of vehicles

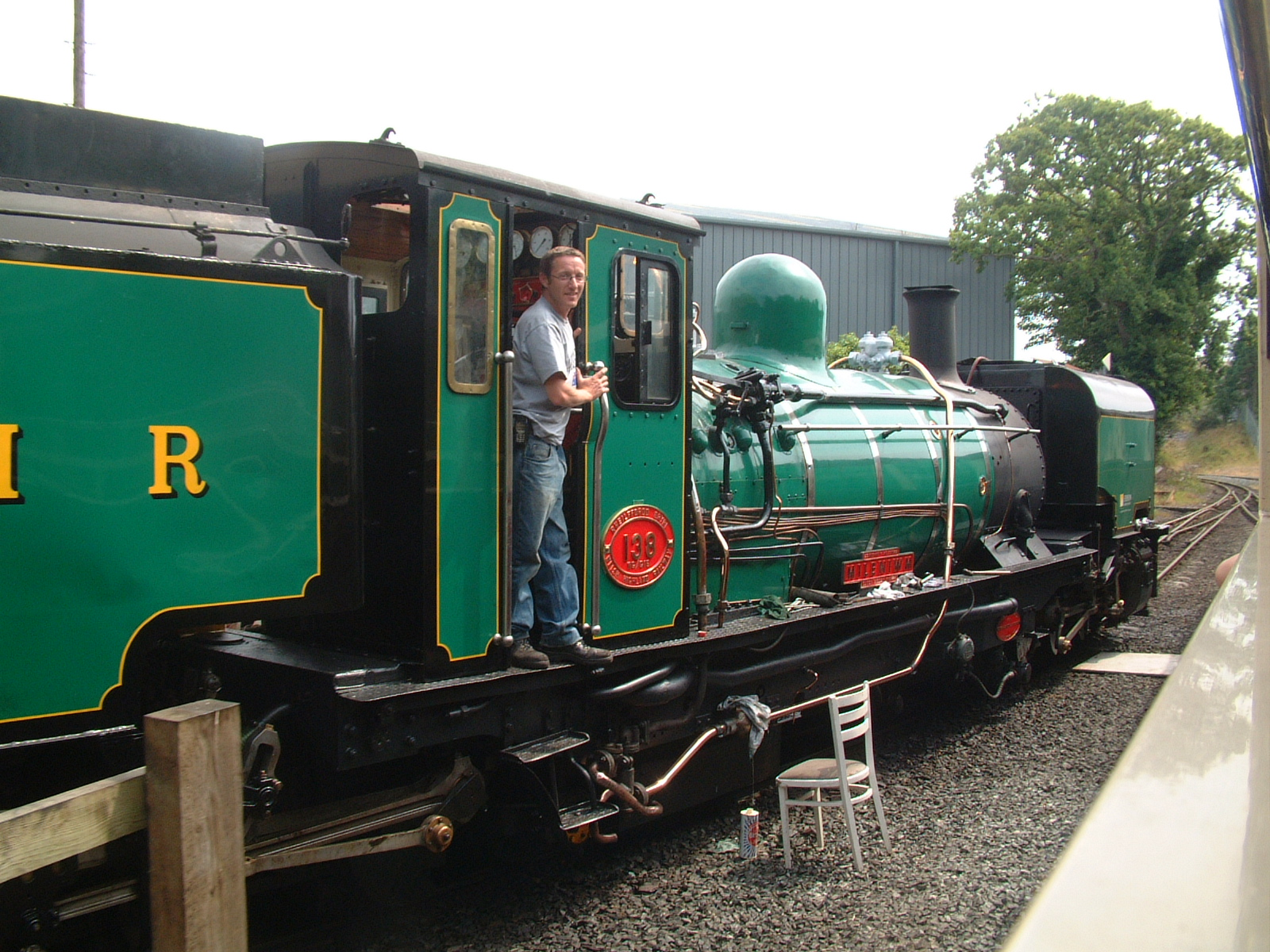
A locomotive engineer stands on the running board of a SAR Class NG G16 Garratt steam locomotive on the Welsh Highland Railway

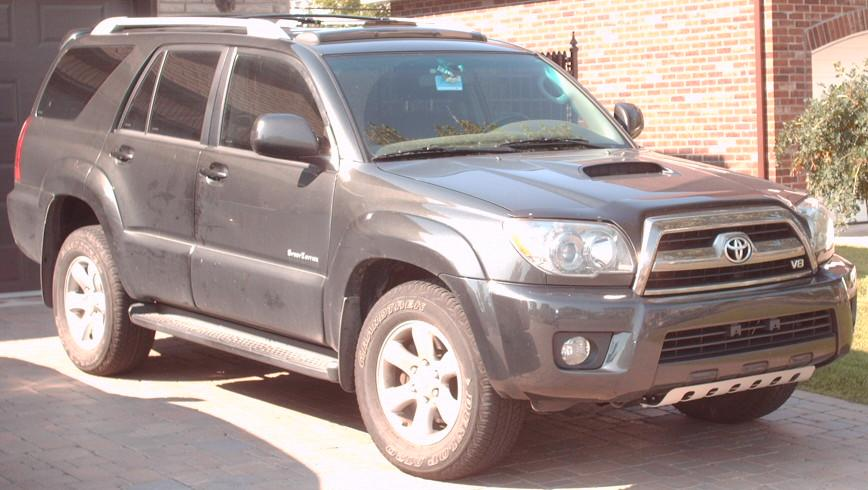
Toyota 4Runner with running board

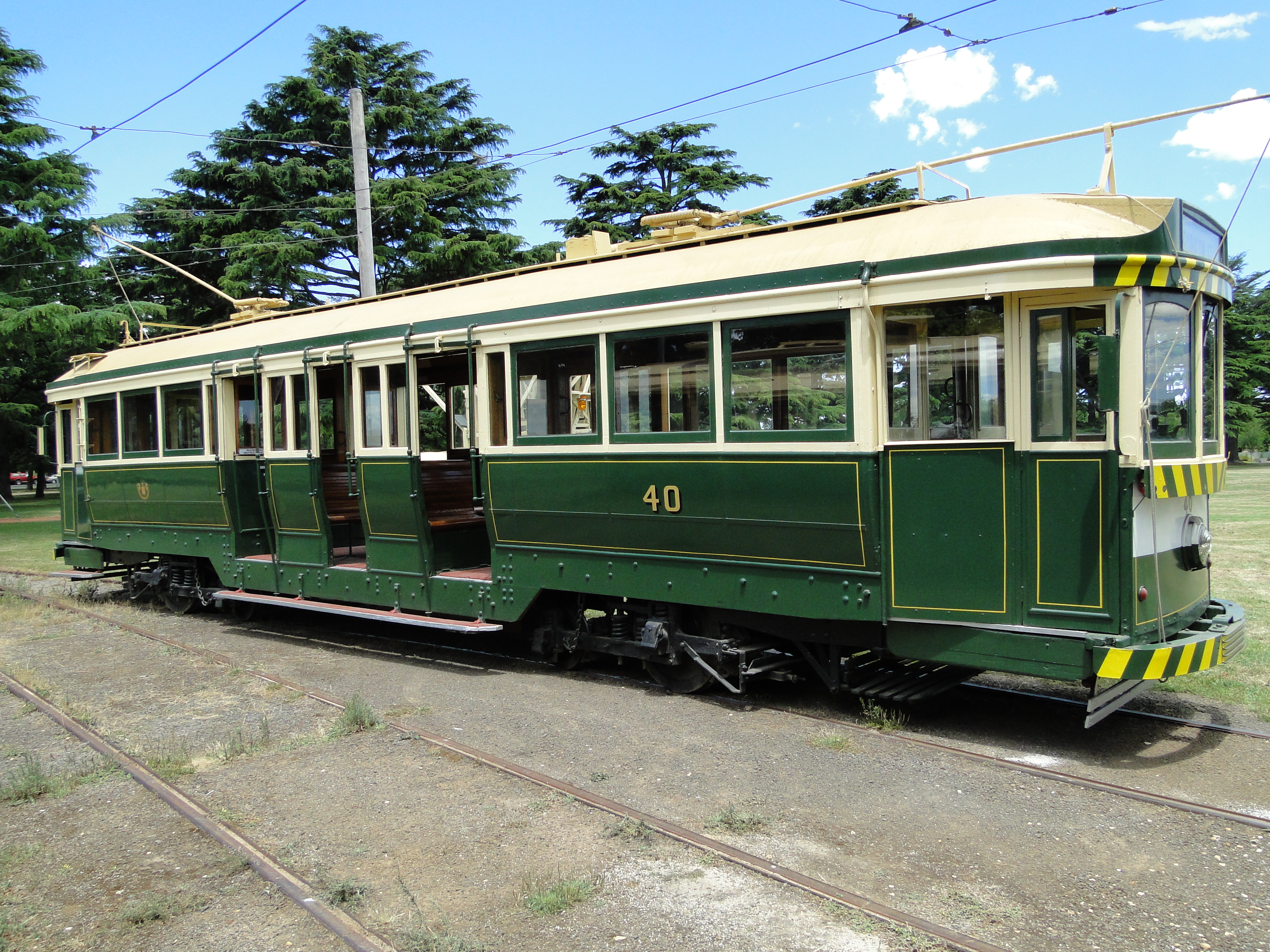
Vintage tram, with red footboard visible running along the lower tram-side underneath the three central doors

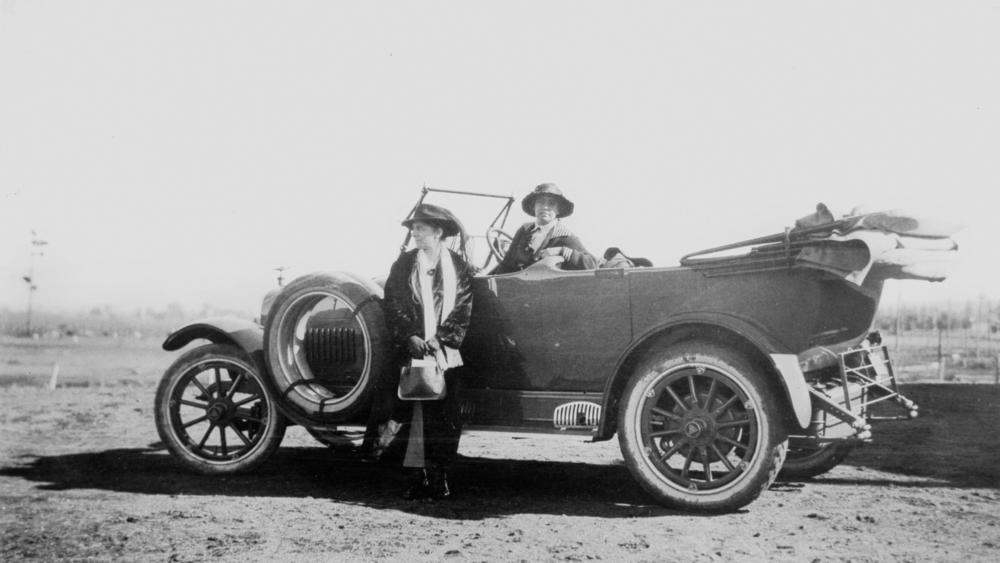
Woman standing next to a car's running board

A running board or footboard is a narrow step fitted for passenger transport under the side doors of a compartment train, tram, car, or truck.

It aids entry, especially into high vehicles, and is typical of vintage trams and cars, which had much higher ground clearances than today's vehicles. Today, they are most common on passenger vehicles in the SUVs and off-roader segments, such as the Toyota Land Cruiser, Volvo XC90, Jetour T2, and Lexus GX. They may be installed by manufacturers from the factory, or may be added as an aftermarket part.

Running boards are also used as an aesthetic feature on vehicles that would not otherwise require them, and may serve both an aesthetic and practical function. Common materials for running boards include aluminum, fiberglass, stainless steel, and ABS plastic.

Some running boards, such as ones installed on luxury SUVs, may be electronically retractable. For example, they may retract and deploy with the press of a button in the passenger compartment. Some also function automatically, depending on the state of the vehicle's ignition, state of the door locks, or depending on whether the driver's door is open or closed.

== History ==
The origin of the name running board is obscure; the first running boards predate automobiles and were installed on carriages as early as the 17th century.

=== Rail ===
With some old trains, passengers who wanted to move between compartments while the train was moving had to walk along externally mounted running board. The German phrase "Trittbrettfahrer" (riding on the running board) now has the proverbial meaning "free-rider" (non-paying user).

The term also applied to the walkways on top of railway/railroad boxcars. Originally, they were used by brakemen to travel from car to car to apply hand-operated brakes. With the adoption of the air brake this practice was abandoned.

However, the running board was still used as an observation point to pass hand signals to the train driver (train engineer in North America) when cars were being shunted (switched in North America). The increased use of radio communication made this unnecessary. Today, most countries forbid anyone to be atop a moving freight car.

=== Automobile ===
The first automobile designed without running boards was the 1929 Ruxton.

== See also ==
- Footplate
- Nerf bar
- Train surfing
