= Karlsruhe Railway Repair Works =

Railway workshop in Baden-Württemberg, Germany

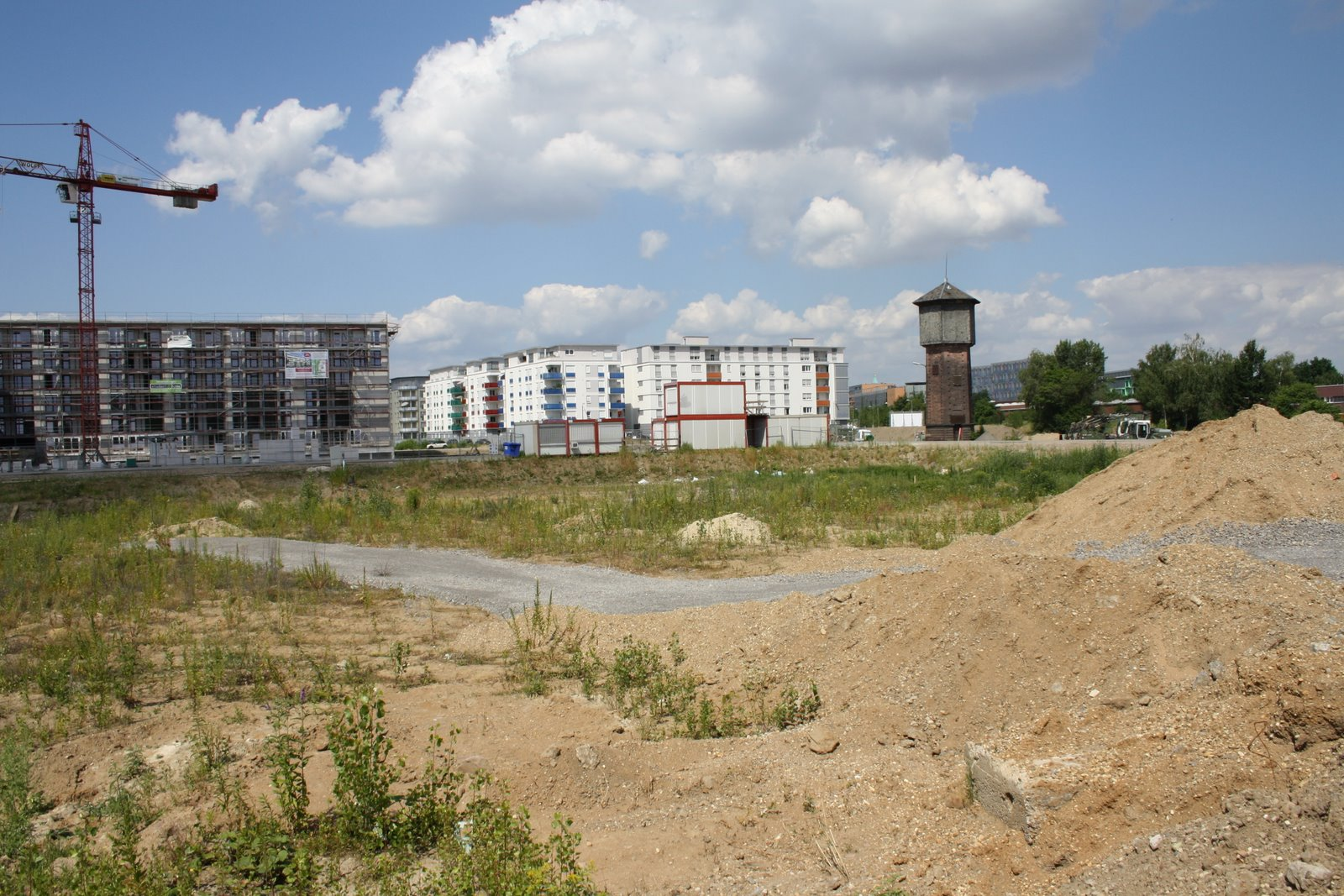
Construction of Citypark with Repair Works Water Tower visible

The Karlsruhe Railway Repair Works was a Ausbesserungswerk (Railway workshop) of the Deutsche Bahn. It operated from 1849 until 1997 and was located in the southern district of Karlsruhe, between the eastern section of Kriegsstraße (now Ludwig-Erhard-Allee) and Stuttgarter Straße.

== History ==
=== Beginnings ===
In 1843, the first railway station was opened in the city at Ettlinger Tor. Due to the growing importance of railways during this time and increased rail traffic, the need for a repair works became apparent after only five years. Originally established by the Grand Duchy of Baden State Railway as the main workshop for the maintenance of all its rolling stock, the plant would employ more than 5,200 people at its peak around the end of World War I. Despite this, the maintenance of locomotives was transferred to other railway repair works by 1932. From this point until the Second World War Karlsruhe Repair Works specialized in the maintenance and inspection of various railroad cars.

=== World War 2 ===
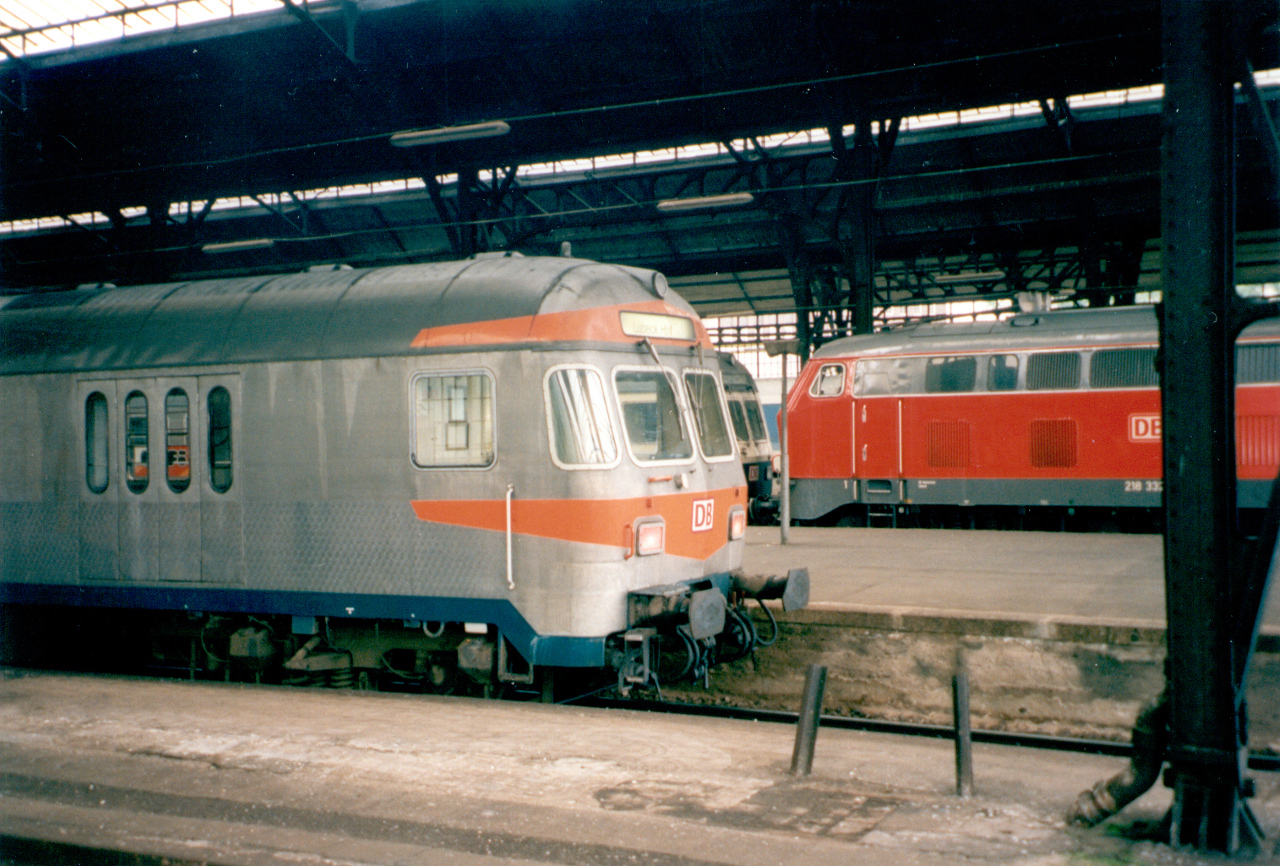
Lübeck, 1998: a Karlsruher Kopf Control Car

During the War, the facility was 95% destroyed and following its reconstruction, the rebuilt works specialized in the maintenance of passenger coaches.

=== Post war recovery ===
By the early 1970s, the Deutsche Bundesbahn had largely recovered and was once again a major employer at the cite, having increased the workforce to between 2,500 and 3,000 workers. A legacy of the works, was the large number of n-coaches that were converted into control cars at the site; within the railway these were referred to as Karlsruher Kopf ("Karlsruhe Head").

=== Closure and transformation ===
Starting in 1997 the works closed; many of the original or rebuilt buildings and halls were demolished. The city of Karlsruhe undertook a land reuse project, creating the new residential district of "Karlsruhe City Park" on the site, which was completed in 2017. The former canteen building of the repair works was preserved and modernized; since 2001 it has housed the Bürgerzentrum Südwerk community centre. The old water tower was also preserved and is now used as a hotel.
