= N-Wagen =

n-Wagen
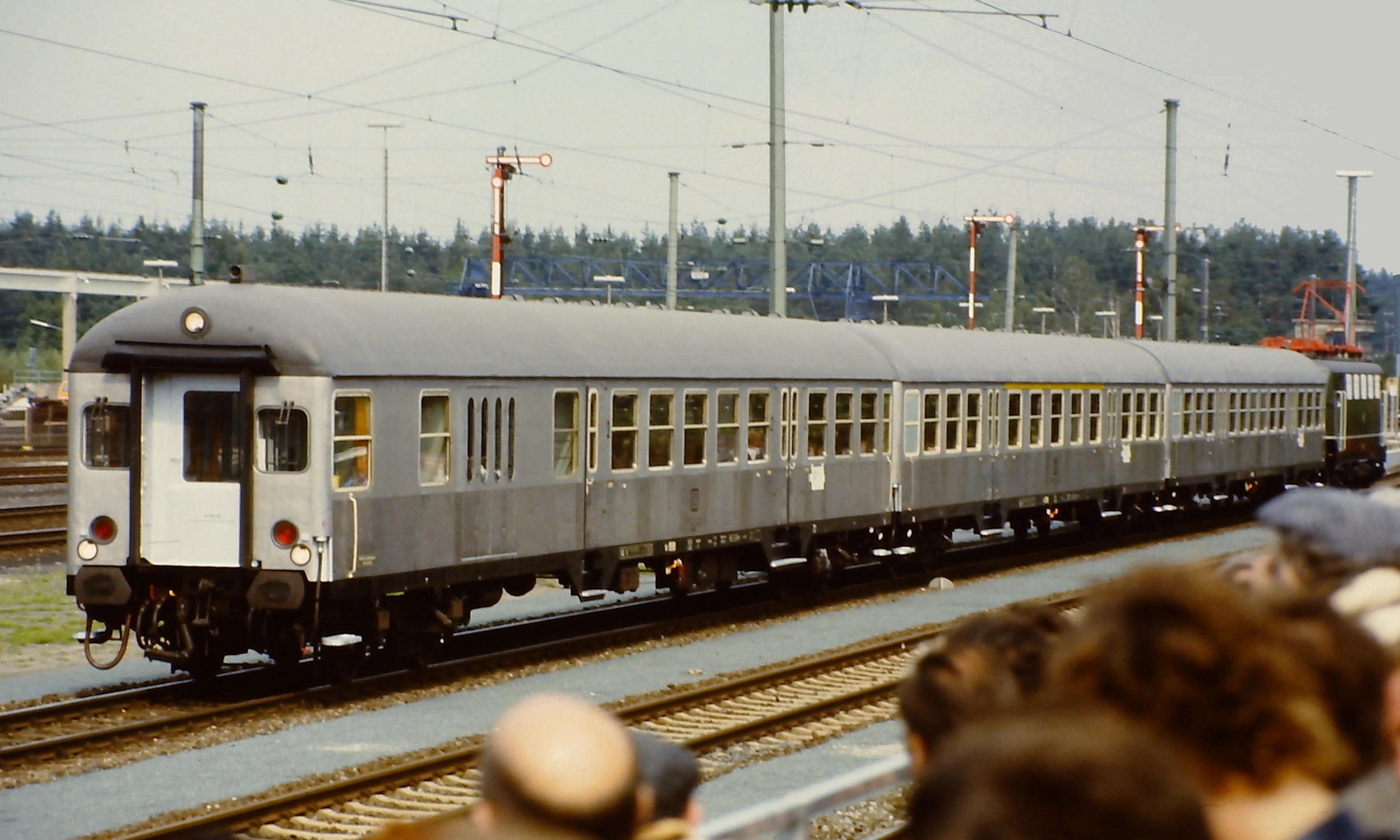
- Push-pull train of n-coaches at the anniversary parade in 1985 in Nuremberg
- Constructed: Prototypes from 1958, 1959–1980

Specifications
- Car length: 26,400 mm (86 ft 7 1/4 in) over buffers
- Width: 2,825 mm (9 ft 3 1/4 in)
- Height: 4,050 mm (13 ft 3 1/2 in)
- Wheel diameter: 950 mm (3 ft 1 3/8 in)
- Maximum speed: 120 or 140 km/h (75 or 87 mph) (depending on design)
- Weight: 31–40 t (31–39 long tons; 34–44 short tons)
- Bogies: 2,500 mm (8 ft 2 3/8 in) wheelbase, 19 m (62 ft 4 in) bogie centres
- Braking systems: shoe brakes; later also disc brakes
- Seating: ABn: 2×24 second 30 first; Bn: 96 second; BDn: 72 second
- Track gauge: 1,435 mm (4 ft 8 1/2 in)

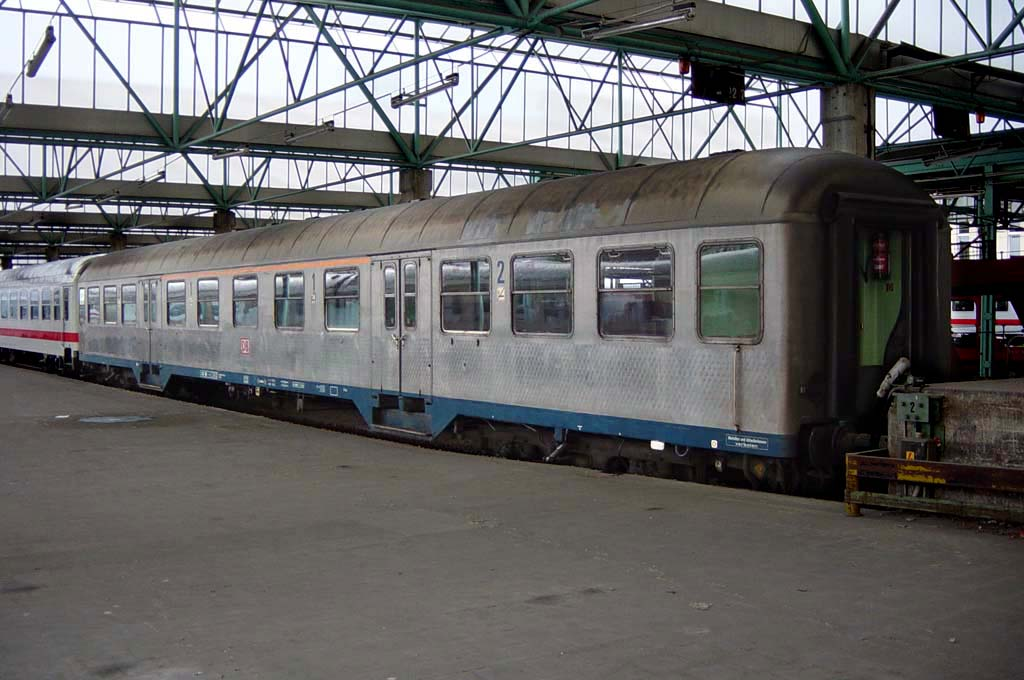
n-car with 1st and 2nd class sections

The n-Wagen ("n-coaches") are a type of passenger coach used by Deutsche Bundesbahn and subsequently Deutsche Bahn. With two double-leafed doors per side to enable a high passenger throughput rate, the coaches were conceived for short dwell times in commuter and regional transit. Succeeding the yl-coaches, 5,000 units were built from 1958 to 1981, with some remaining in service still today.

== Origin of the name ==
The UIC classification identifier letter "n" is an abbreviation for Nahverkehr ("local transit"); the complete description is local transit passenger coach (Nahverkehrswagen) with a length of over 24.5 meteres, open coach with centre aisle in 2nd class, centre aisle or side corridor in 1st class, two centre doors, with 36-pole control cable for push-pull operations.

The term Silberling (from German Silber, "silver") derives from the coaches' stainless steel body, which was originally unpainted, giving them a unique silver look.

== Technical data ==
Total length:	26,400 mm
Distance between bogie pivots:	21,500 mm
Empty weight:	42-47 t
Maximum speed:	120 or 140 km/h (varies by type)
Number of seats:	96 seats in second class in Bn coaches 2×24 seats in second and 30 in first class in ABn coaches.

=== Type overview ===
Type	Year built	Number	Notes
ABn 703	1959 – 66	798	5 cars with central control (ABnz 703), 20 cars with multi-voltage heating
ABnr 704	1965 – 67	34	
ABnrz 704	1968 – 77	380	
ABnrz 708	1977	1	Karlsruher Versuchszug (Karlsruhe experimental train)
Bn 719	1969 – 76	1070	
Bn 720	1959 – 63	1019	
Bnz 723	1965/66	30	Multi-voltage heating
Bnrz 723	1966	40	
Bnrz 724	1969/70	180	Field hospital car, steep roof
Bnrz 724.1	1989/90	18	remodeled from Bnrz 725
Bnr 725	1966 – 68	190	
Bnrz 725	1967 – 77	449	
Bnrz 728	1977 – 80	100	Steep roof
Bnrz 729	1977	2	Karlsruher Versuchszug (Karlsruhe experimental train)
Bnrz 734	1977	1	Karlsruher Versuchszug (Karlsruhe experimental train)
BDnf 735	1978 – 81	71	Rebuilt from BDnf 738, cab car w/o door
BDnf 738	1959 – 64	229	Cab car with front passenger door, 20 cars with multi-voltage heating
BDnrzf 739	1969	40	Cab car with front passenger door, cab removed later on
BDnrzf 740	1971 – 77	310	Cab car, model Karlsruhe
BDn 742	1961 – 64	29	no cab, rebuilt from BDnf 738, 20 cars with multi-voltage heating

- Indicator z: Central control (Zugsammelschiene)
- Indicator r: disc brakes

== See also ==
- Rail transport in Germany
- History of rail transport in Germany
