= DRG Class ET 85 =

Class of German electric multiple units

DRG Class ET/ES/EB 85 DB Class 485/885
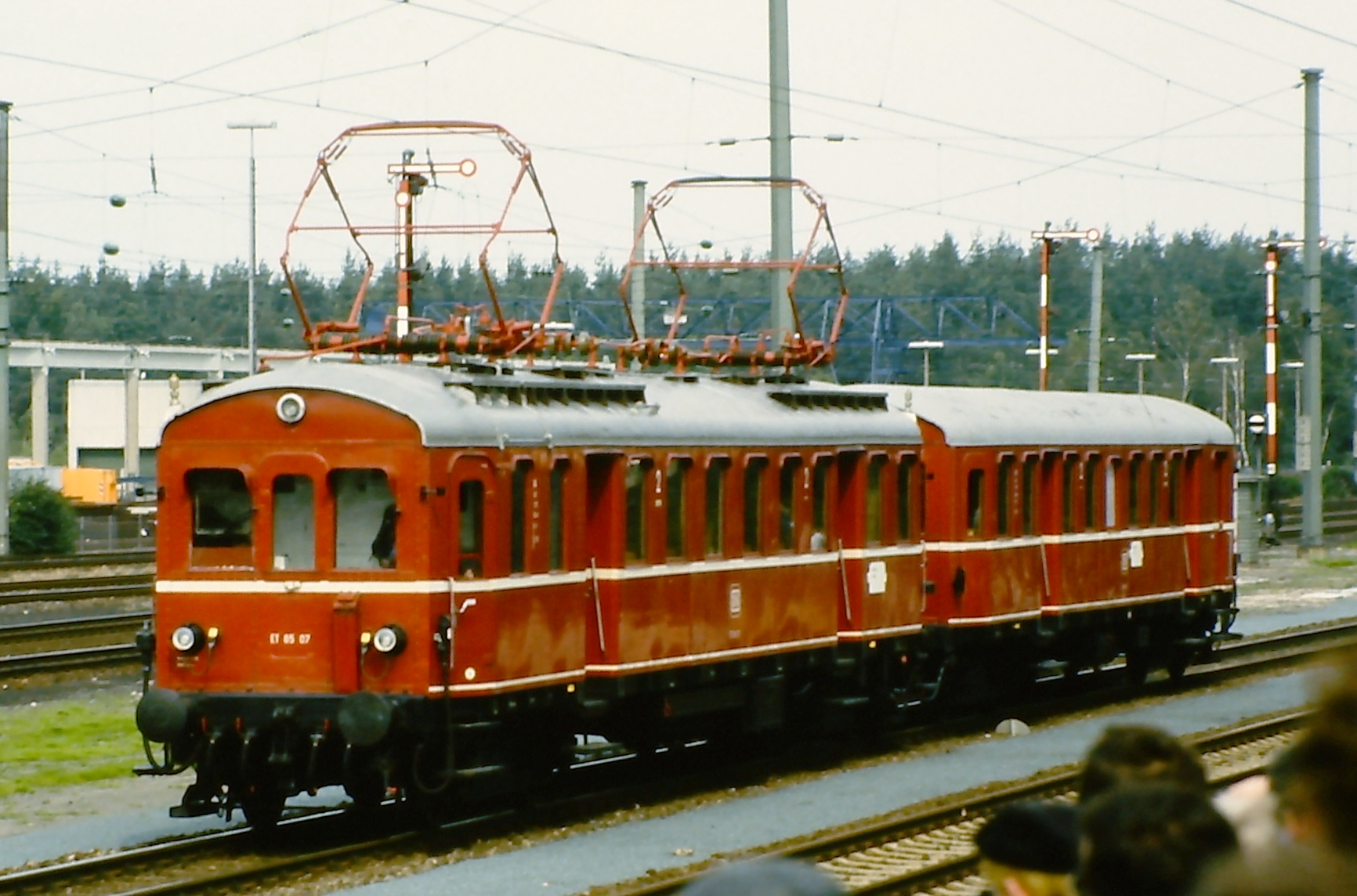
- DRG Class ET 85 and driving trailer at the “150 years of German railways” jubilee parade in Nuremberg
- In service: 1927–1977
- Manufacturers: Waggonfabrik Fuchs; MAN (mechanical); Brown, Boveri & Cie (electrical)
- Constructed: 1927–1932
- Number built: ET: 36; ES: 34; ES: 70
- Fleet numbers: DRG: ET 85 01–36; DRG: ES 85 01–34; DRG: EB 85 01–70

Specifications
- Train length: 20.34 m (66 ft 9 in)
- Maximum speed: 75 km/h (47 mph)
- Weight: 61.4 t (60.4 long tons; 67.7 short tons)
- Axle load: 17.7 t (17.4 long tons; 19.5 short tons)
- Traction motors: 2
- Power output: 550 kW (740 hp)
- Transmission: Tatzlager
- Electric system: 15 kV 16 2/3 Hz AC Catenary
- Current collection: Pantograph
- UIC classification: ET: Bo′2′; ES: 2'2'; EB: 3
- Track gauge: 1,435 mm (4 ft 8 1/2 in)

The DRG Class ET 85 was a German electric motor coach with the Deutsche Reichsbahn and, later, the Deutsche Bundesbahn.

== History ==
In 1924 the Waggonfabrik Fuchs coach factory in Heidelberg converted four Bavarian MCCi steam railbuses into Class ET 85 electric railbuses with running numbers 01–04. After this conversion an order for 32 new vehicles of this type was delivered to Fuchs and BBC to be built from 1927 to 1933. In 1927 it was still not possible to locate the entire electric engine unter the coach floor. The transformer and the switching (Schaltwerk) was therefore installed in an engine compartment. The nine railbuses were only a little longer than their "prototypes". The doors to the passenger section were recessed like those of their predecessors, however there was only a single door to the engine compartment on the right hand side of the vehicle. All units up to number ET 85 30 originally had front doors and gangways that were later removed.

In identical form and with the same internal layout - instead of the engine room, there was a luggage compartment - driving cars ES 85 01–34 appeared from 1927 to 1933. Rebuilt six-wheeled Bavarian passenger coaches, numbers EB 85 01–70, acted as trailer cars; they were later replaced by six-wheeled 'rebuild coaches', the so-called Umbau-Wagen. Motor coaches ET 85 05 and 09 were equipped for top speeds of 100 km/h. The DB took over the Class ET 85 and reclassified them in 1968 as DB Class 485/885. These vehicles were not just employed in Munich suburban services but also by the Deutsche Bundesbahn in the Black Forest on the Three Lakes Railway and the Wehra Valley Line.

By 1977 all the vehicles had been retired; the last ones being nos. 485 005 + 885 709.

In 1949 numbers ET 85 13, 14 and 16 were converted to ET 90 01–03. After re-motoring they were used on the inclined route from Berchtesgaden to Königssee and occasionally also on the Ammer Valley Railway. In 1972 the ET 90s were retired.

Number 485 007 + 885 615 is preserved in the Bochum-Dahlhausen Railway Museum.

== See also ==
- List of DB locomotives and railbuses
- List of DRG locomotives and railbuses
- List of Bavarian locomotives and railbuses
