= Ausbesserungswerk =

Railway workshops in Germany

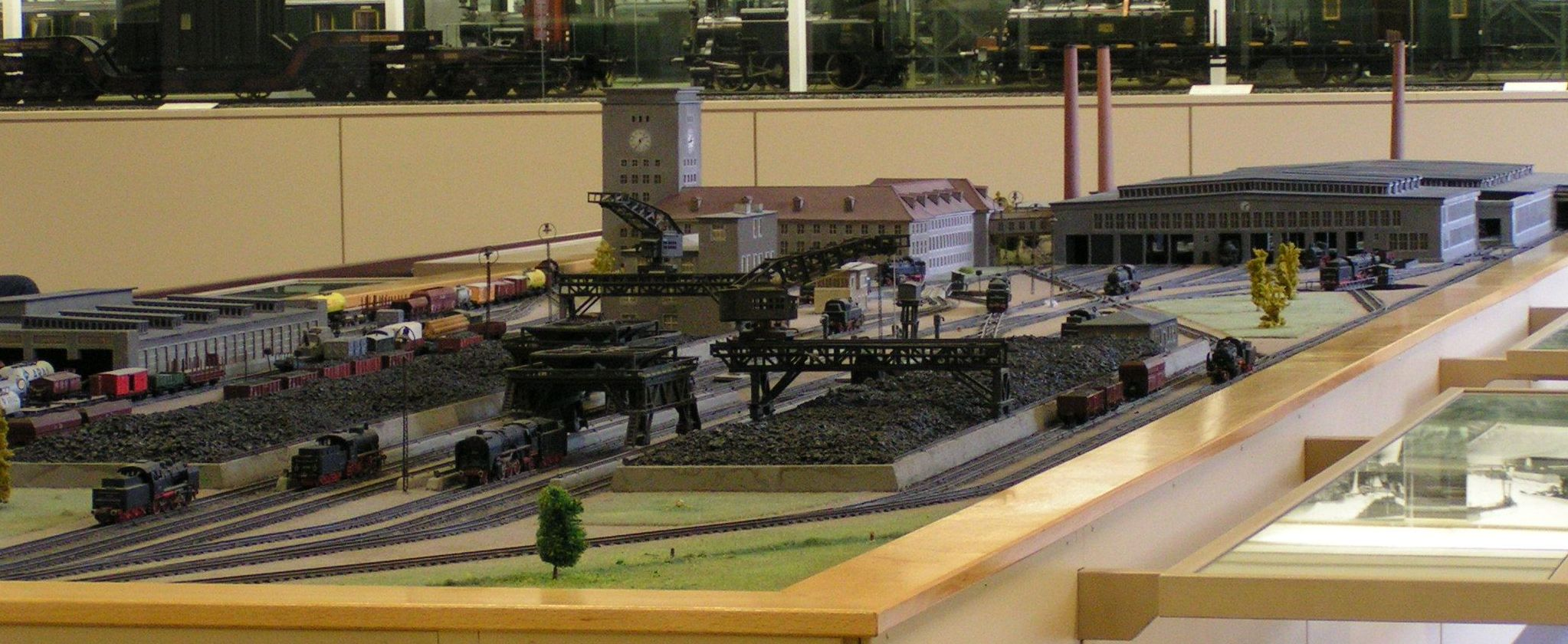
Model of a steam locomotive Ausbesserungswerk planned before the 2nd World War, displayed in the Nuremberg Transport Museum

An Ausbesserungswerk (abbreviation AW or Aw) is a railway facility in German-speaking countries, the primary function of which is the repair (and formerly also the construction) of railway vehicles or their components. It is thus equivalent to a 'repair shop' or 'works'. It is also referred to as a Centralwerkstatt or Zentralwerkstatt (central workshop) or Hauptwerkstatt (main workshop). During the Deutsche Reichsbahn-Gesellschaft (DRG) period between the two world wars as well as the period of the Deutsche Reichsbahn in East Germany these facilities were called Reichsbahnausbesserungswerke (RAW or Raw; Reichsbahn repair shops).

== Terminology ==
Whilst the term Ausbesserungswerk was used by the former Deutsche Bundesbahn in West Germany after the war, the railway workshops in the Deutsche Reichsbahn in East Germany continued to refer to them as Reichsbahnausbesserungswerke until 1992. The term Hauptwerkstatt was also commonly used by state railways (Länderbahn) or private railways and they are still called that today, for example, in Austria. In general the Deutsche Bahn today uses the term Werk (works); these facilities belonging to the DB Instandhaltung GmbH.

== Functions ==
In contrast to the Bahnbetriebswerke, that are responsible for routine, everyday tasks, Ausbesserungswerke specialise in major repairs, general inspections and the refurbishment of exchangeable components. In addition they handle the conversion and modernisation of vehicles, as well as the construction of new vehicles in some cases. On top of the maintenance of vehicles, most Ausbesserungswerke also carry out the manufacture of turnouts, the construction of signal gantries, platform roofing and similar steel structures. Depending on the particular specialisation of an individual Ausbesserungswerk it may also be described as a Reisezugwagenwerk (coach works), Güterwagenwerk (goods wagon works) or Weichenwerk (turnout works).

== History ==
With the expansion of the railway network from the middle of the 19th century a large number of Ausbesserungswerke sprang up in the entire German speaking world. During the transition from maintenance-intensive steam traction to the more maintenance-friendly electric and diesel locomotives, as well as the increasing rationalisation of workshop operations, the number of Ausbesserungswerke needed could be reduced significantly. Today the Deutsche Bahn only retains the Ausbesserungswerke at Neumünster (coaches), Cottbus (diesel locomotives), Chemnitz (components), Paderborn-Nord (goods wagons), Witten (turnout works), Bremen (diesel locomotives), Kassel (diesel railcars), Krefeld-Oppum (electric railcars), Dessau (electric locomotives), Fulda (components), Nuremberg (electric railcars), Meiningen (historic vehicles, goods wagons and snow clearing equipment), Eberswalde (goods wagons), Zwickau (goods wagons) and Wittenberge (coaches). In addition, there are Hauptwerkstätten for the Berlin S-Bahn at Berlin-Schöneweide and the Hamburg S-Bahn at Hamburg-Ohlsdorf.

The Deutsche Bahn AG aside, the Austrian Federal Railways, Swiss Federal Railways and large private railways have their own Hauptwerkstätten. In Weiden, Stendal and Delitzsch Ausbesserungswerke belonging to the DB AG and its predecessors have been transferred to private ownership.

A private Ausbesserungswerk in Unterhausen (Bavaria) at Neuburg an der Donau maintains goods vehicles, mainly tank wagons.

== Typical layout ==
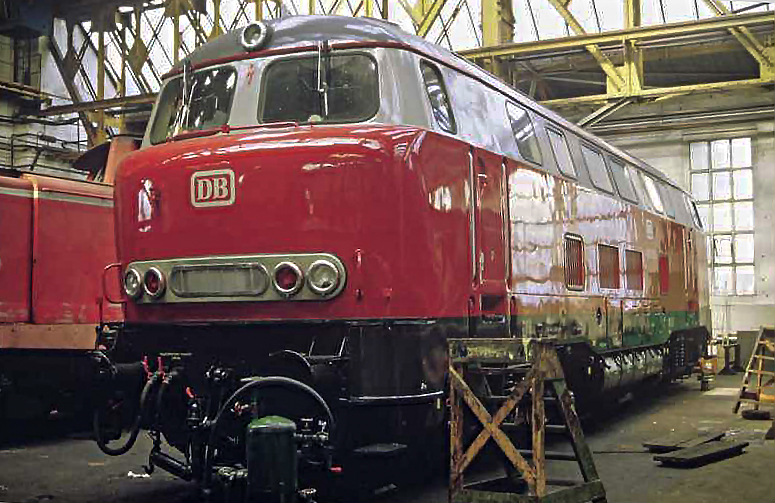
A diesel loco in AW Bremen, 1984

The constructional heart of an Ausbesserungswerk is usually a large, multi-track, main workshop building (the Richthalle), which enables several railway vehicles to be worked on simultaneously at a number of work stations. These stations are equipped with lifting gear in order to be able to jack vehicles up and separate the wagon bodies from their undercarriages. Adjoining the main workshop are mechanical and electrical workshops for the refurbishment and repair of individual components such as undercarriages, brake equipment and motors. The external livery of railway vehicles is carried out in a paint shed, separate from the main workshop.

== U-Bahn and tram repair shops ==
Hauptwerkstätten for railway vehicles are not just found on normal railways, but also on the U-Bahn (underground) and tramways. Due to the comparatively small number of vehicles to be maintained the Hauptwerkstätten are in most cases attached to tramway sheds (Bahnbetriebshöfen). An example of a tram workshop is the Hauptwerkstätte of the Vienna tramway system.

== Former Ausbesserungswerke in Germany ==
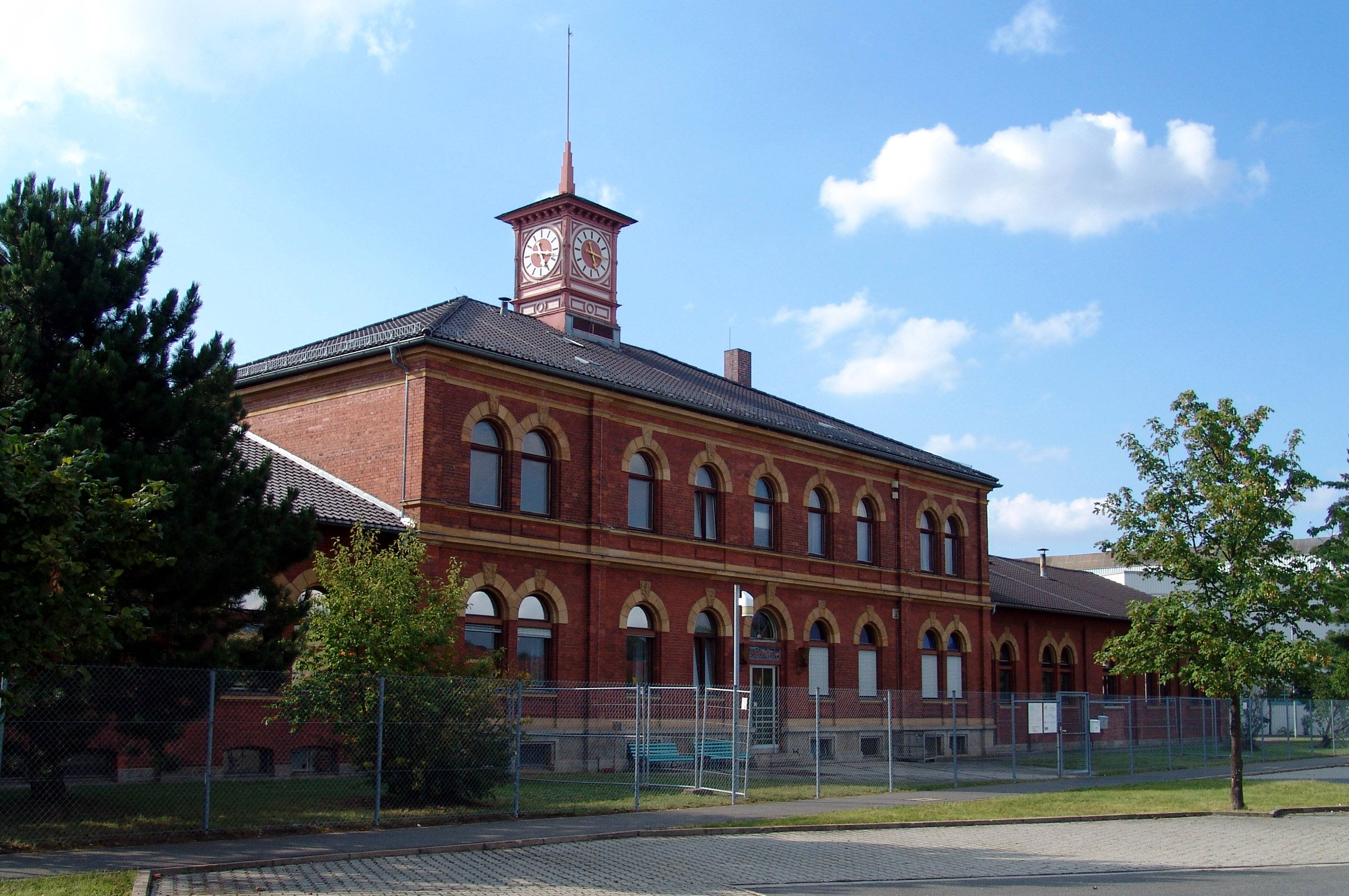
Headquarters building of the former Ausbesserungswerk at Weiden

In addition to Ausbesserungswerke still in use, the Deutsche Bahn AG and its predecessors had Ausbesserungswerke and Hauptwerkstätten at the following locations:

- Aalen
- Augsburg (now the Augsburg Railway Park)
- Betzdorf
- Berlin-Friedrichshain
- Berlin-Grunewald
- Berlin-Schöneweide (today Hw Schöneweide of the Berliner S-Bahn
- Berlin-Staaken (briefly)
- Berlin-Tempelhof
- Brandenburg
- Braunschweig
- Darmstadt (coach and locomotive works)
- Chemnitz
- Delitzsch, today SFW Schienenfahrzeugwerk Delitzsch
- Dresden-Friedrichstadt
- Duisburg-Wedau
- Esslingen am Neckar
- Frankfurt am Main
- Frankfurt-Nied
- Friedrichshafen
- Glückstadt
- Görlitz-Schlauroth
- Gotha
- Göttingen
- Greifswald (later a road vehicle works (Kraftwagenausbesserungswerk or KAW) for the DR)
- Halberstadt (today a private AW for the VIS GmbH)
- Halle an der Saale
- Hamburg-Harburg
- Hannover-Leinhausen (nowadays partly used for the üstra city railways)
- Ingolstadt
- Jena
- Jülich
- Karlsruhe
- Karlsruhe-Durlach
- Kaiserslautern
- Köln-Nippes
- Kornwestheim
- Leipzig-Engelsdorf
- Limburg an der Lahn
- Lingen
- Lübeck
- Magdeburg
- Mainz
- Malchin
- Mülheim (today a locomotive shed for the Mülheim VerkehrsGesellschaft)
- München-Freimann
- München-Neuaubing
- Offenburg
- Oldenburg
- Opladen
- Osnabrück
- Paderborn Hbf
- Potsdam
- Recklinghausen
- Regensburg
- Rostock
- Saarbrücken-Burbach
- Schwerte
- Schwetzingen
- Siegen
- Stendal (today a private AW for Alstom)
- Stuttgart-Bad Cannstatt
- Stuttgart Nord
- Trier
- Weiden (today part of the Stadler Rail works)
- Zwickau

== See also ==
- Bahnbetriebswerk (steam locomotives)
- Motive power depot
