= Compartment coach =

Railway carriage type

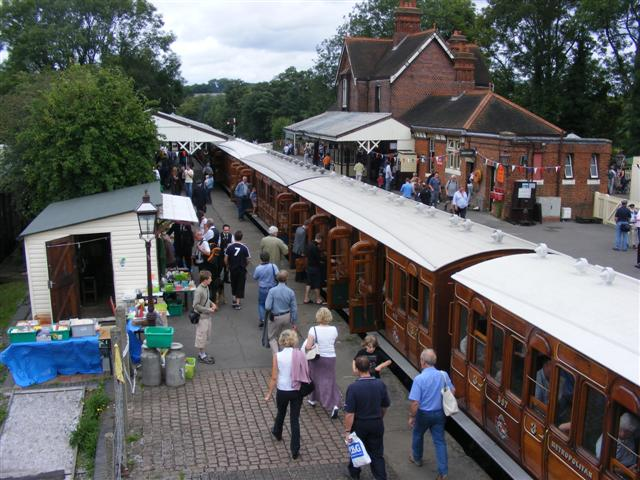
Bluebell Railway

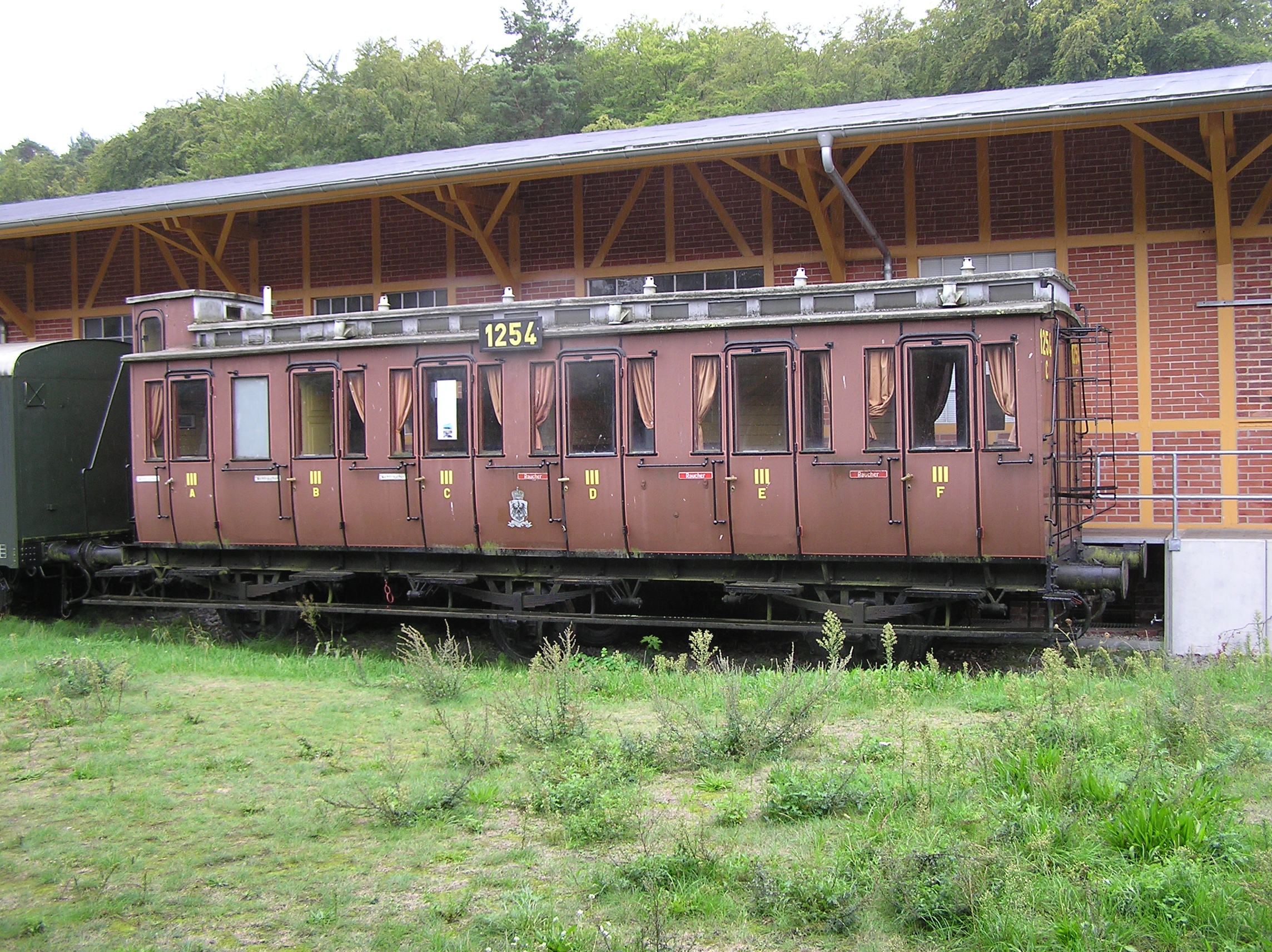
Prussian State Railways 3rd class compartment coach

A compartment coach is a railway passenger coach (US: passenger car) divided into separate areas or compartments, with no means of moving between compartments.

The compartment coach should not be confused with the corridor coach which also has separate compartments but, by contrast, has a corridor down one side of the coach interior onto which the compartment doors open.

== English origins ==
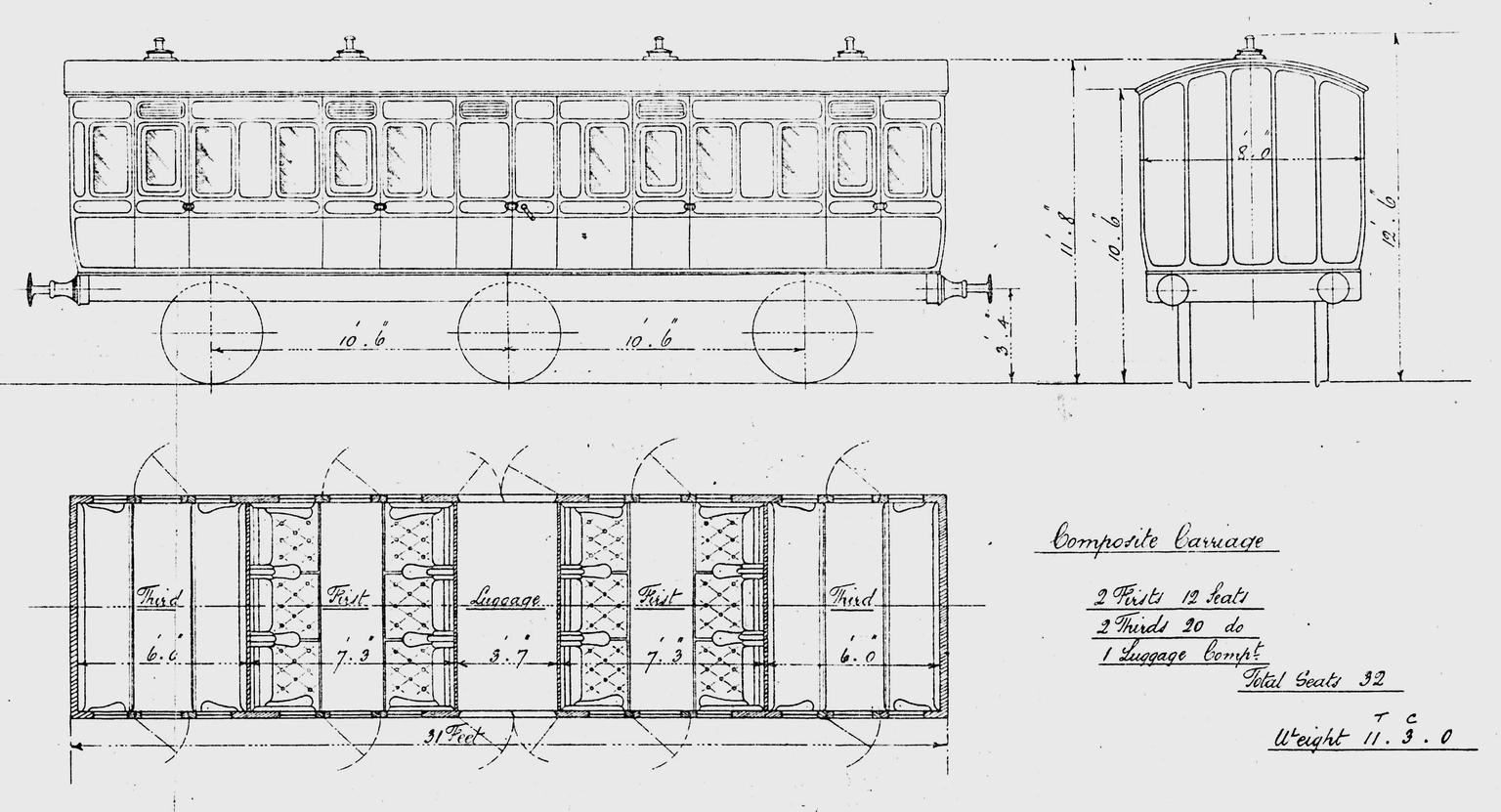

Originally compartment coaches were passenger coaches with several separate compartments in the same coach body, each compartment having its own doors on the side of the coach to enable passengers to board and alight. The compartment coach was developed at the very beginning of the railway era in England simply by placing a post coach body on a railway undercarriage. Compartment coaches were used across almost the whole of Europe and were built right up to the 1930s. On London commuter lines, non-corridor compartment coaches were designed to maximise passenger capacity and facilitate rapid boarding and alighting, catering to the high demand of suburban services. British Railways Mark 1 non-corridor compartment carriages were constructed until 1956, primarily for short-distance routes where quick access was prioritised over onboard amenities. On Southern Region lines out of London, certain electric multiple units (EMUs) with non-corridor compartment designs, such as the Class 415 (4EPB) units, remained in service until the early 1990s. These units were withdrawn following safety concerns, particularly after incidents like the 1988 murder of a woman in a compartment on an Orpington to London Victoria service, which highlighted the risks of isolated compartments. As a result, unrefurbished 4EPB compartment stock was restricted to peak-hour operations with a red stripe at the cantrail and was not used after 8 p.m. On the European continent they were sometimes referred to as English coaches or coaches built to the English system.

== Early compartment coaches ==
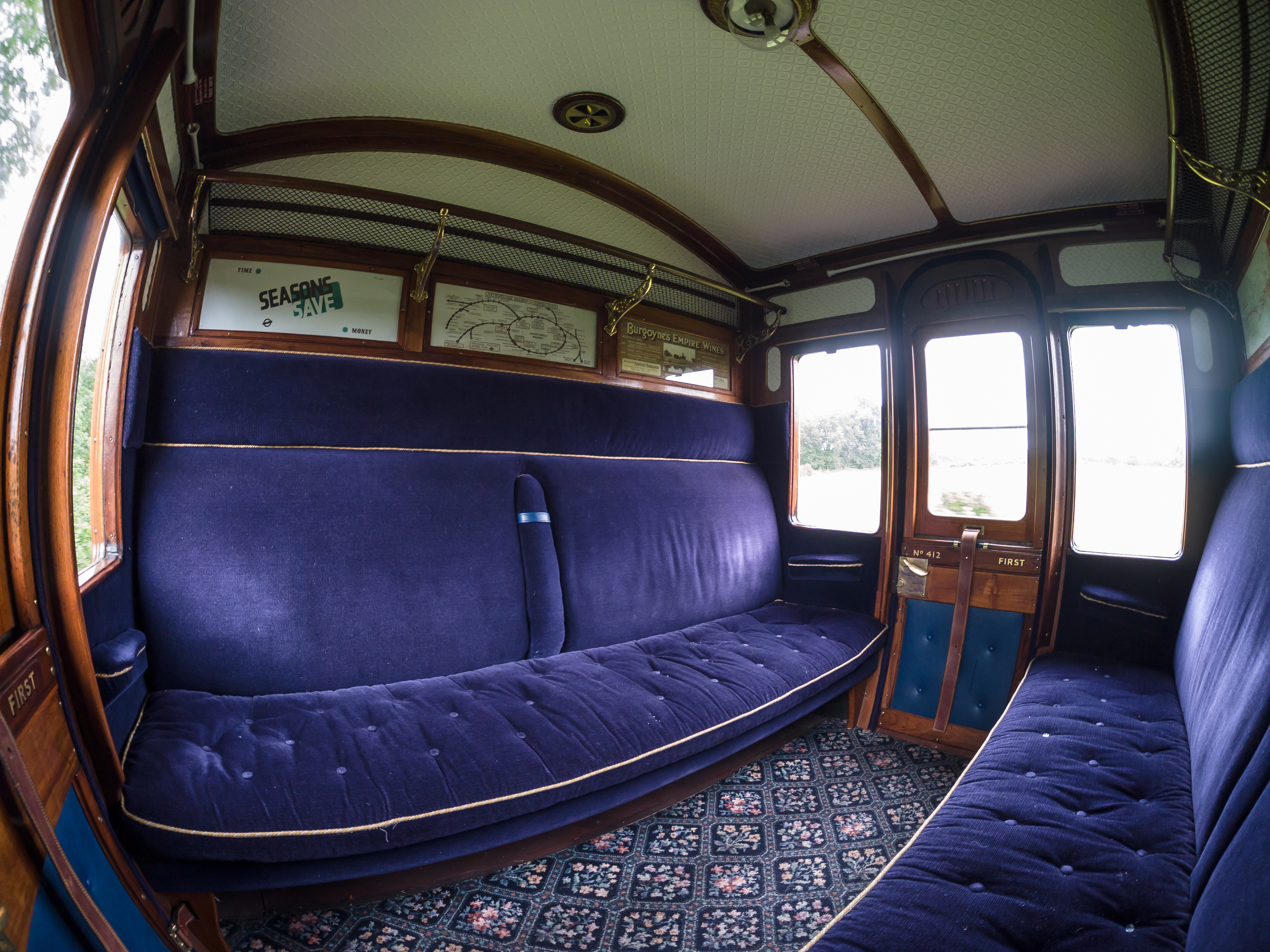
First class interior the entire width of the coach

The first compartment coaches in the 19th century comprised several cabins on one undercarriage, similar to the post coaches. Compartment coaches with doors for each compartment, without any connection between compartments, were built up to the end of the 20th century. The disadvantages of this design were that passengers could not use the toilet or visit the dining car and that train staff had to climb along the outside of the coach on running boards in order to check tickets. Countless four-, six- and eight-wheeled vehicles of this type were used in Germany and especially by the Prussian state railways.

== Development ==
=== Prussia ===
Until about 1880, four-wheeled compartment coaches were typical. After the end of the wave of nationalisations the Prussian state railways, around 1895, acquired the quieter-running six-wheelers. For this, so-called norms were established for four-, six- and, later, eight-wheeled classes of coach. For the six-wheelers, both fixed axle and sliding axle designs were envisaged. Those coaches designed specifically for suburban traffic (Berlin, Hamburg) had no toilets. On the other coaches, a gangway was specified in order to keep the number of toilets to a minimum for economic reasons. Numerous coaches had therefore to be converted. After the end of the 19th century, fourth class compartment coaches were also procured.

Four- and six-wheeled compartment coaches were initially used in all train categories on main lines. With the advent of the D-Zug express coaches in 1892, compartment coaches were deployed in passenger trains on main lines and in built-up areas. Here it became abundantly clear that, in addition a faster turn round of passengers, access to station platforms on main lines could only be permitted if passengers had valid tickets and trains could not be boarded until shortly before their departure. So ticket checking by the guard became a function of station staff. By contrast, open coaches were common on branch lines, because there were often no platform barriers on branch line stations and so tickets had to be checked in the train itself.

From 1895, especially in Prussia and Saxony (but also to a lesser extent in Baden, Bavaria and Alsace-Lorraine), eight-wheeled compartment coaches were built. They were predominantly used in the semi-fast trains or Eilzüge introduced in 1907 and in the so-called fast passenger trains. Over 3,500 coaches were built in several batches starting in 1898. The compartments in the coaches were sometimes linked to provide access to the toilets. In third class coaches the privies lacked flushing facilities until some time later.

Initially the window frames on compartment coaches - like the coach bodies themselves - were made of wood, which very quickly warped. After 1900 they were made of a brass alloy based on a patent by the Julius Pintsch AG firm. The upper part of the window frame on these coaches was rounded.

From 1910 the paraffin lighting was replaced by more efficient gas lighting. After 1900, rising wood prices forced a switch to steel construction and then to lower value materials during the First World War.

Prussian state railways coaches were equipped with standard bogies with two and later three spring systems. Most coaches were 18.55 m long. Initially Westinghouse brakes were used, but after 1900 they were fitted with standard Knorr brakes. The hand brake was housed in a separate brakeman's cabin at one end of the coach. These were removed in 1930.

Of the 21,000 compartment coaches of all types that were built, 14,000 were handed to other countries after the First World War as reparations. Of these, 5,000 went to the re-emergent Poland.

==== Eight-wheeled coaches ====
Prussian class	DRG template	First built	No. of coaches	No. of seats	No. of toilets	Length over buffers	Remarks
ABB	B4 Pr 95	1895	350	10/31	3	18.15 m (59 ft 6 5/8 in)	
ABCC	BC4 Pr 98	1898	200	5/21/32	4	18.20 m (59 ft 8 1/2 in)	
CC	C4 Pr 94	1895	350	80	3	17.88 m (58 ft 7 7/8 in)	
ABB	B4 Pr 02	1902	200	10/31	3		
ABCC	BC4 Pr 98a	1898	200	50/31/32	4		
CC	C4 Pr 02	1902	300	76	5		
ABB	B4 Pr 04	1904	350	10/31	3		
ABCC	BC Pr 04	1904	250	5/21/32	4		
BCC	BC Pr 05	1905	100	20/48	5		
CC	C4 Pr 04	1904	450	76	5		
CC	C Pr 12/12a	1911	650	76	4	18.62 m (61 ft 1 1/8 in)	
BB	B4 Pr 18	1918	40	47	3	19.20 m (62 ft 11 7/8 in)	
CC	C4 Pr 18	1918	86	76	4		

Length over buffers (LüP) is 18.55 m, unless otherwise stated

=== Germany ===
Under the newly formed German Imperial Railways, the Deutsche Reichsbahn, measures were taken to rationalise wagon maintenance from 1920. Once of these was the removal of the centre axle on many of the six-wheeled compartment coaches, because it had been established that this had no negative impact on the riding qualities. In addition, in order to overcome the pressing shortage of coaches following the ceasefire reparations of 1918/19, another 500 four-wheeled compartment coaches of Prussian design were ordered (50 seconds and 450 Wagen third class coaches). In addition, due to the great shortage of wagons, many former Prussian coaches were reallocated to the south German railway divisions so that they could now be seen across the entire German Republic.

In the mid-1920s the brakeman's cabin was removed on those coaches that now ran on electrified routes. With the demise of the fourth passenger class in 1928, many compartment coaches were converted to coaches with heavy luggage sections (Traglastenwagen) by combining of compartments. After the DRG had introduced new four-door Typs E 30 Eilzugwagen (semi-fast coaches) in 1930, still more coaches had passenger compartments knocked into larger compartments which were classed as heavy luggage compartments (Traglastenabteil).

Several of these compartment coaches were used for express services along the Ruhr (Ruhrschnellverkehr). They were given the DRG's red and beige livery used for multiple-unit trains. The window sections of second class coaches were painted in Stadtbahn blue-green (RAL 6004) as on the Berlin S-Bahn. Even 18 new compartment coaches were bought for this purpose.

Most of the compartment coaches were rebuilt by the Deutsche Bundesbahn (DB) in the 1950s into Umbauwagen (rebuild coaches). The compartment coaches that remained in the East German Reichsbahn (DR) had several compartments combined and, as on the six-wheeled coaches, every second door was removed. In the 1960s the compartment coaches were converted to the so-called Rekowagen (rebuilds).

== Postwar ==
Since the Second World War compartment coaches have largely died out in Germany, as in other European countries, and have been largely replaced by corridor coaches and, increasingly nowadays, open coaches.
