= Eilzug =

Type of passenger train in Austria, Germany and Switzerland

An Eilzug (plural: Eilzüge) is a type of passenger train which runs regionally, and does not stop at all stations; it is similar to a modern regional express train, 'fast stopping train' or 'semi-fast train'. The term has largely been superseded, but is still used on some lines.

== Germany ==
In Germany Eilzug trains were middle-distance trains that usually ran between two conurbations and only stopped at important railway stations. In several public transport systems, there are also metropolitan railways (Stadtbahn, US: rapid transit) where trains on some routes run as Eilzüge, stopping at fewer stations. The successor to the Eilzug in Germany today is the Regional-Express train.

The term Eilzug was introduced first in Bavaria in 1902, and later in Prussia in 1907 and Saxony in 1908, for express trains with no supplementary fare, and which as a rule were formed of older compartment coaches. From about 1919 they only ran with second and third class passenger classes.

From 7 October 1928 a supplement had to be paid for Eilzüge, which was usually half the express train fare. During the 1930s specific coaches or Eilzugwagen were designed and built for them. They were built in various classes until the 1950s.

From 1952 there were also the so-called Städteschnellzüge ('city express trains') that were supplement-free. Later the DB scrapped the Eilzug supplement completely; the DR followed suit in 1991. In the 1960s the concept widened. There were Eilzug trains that worked branch lines and had distinct long-distance duties - known in everyday speech as Heckeneilzug (hedgerow Eilzug) – and so-called Bezirkseilzüge (district Eilzüge), which handled the busy local services in built-up areas. Several of these trains have been called StadtExpress trains since 1995.

The DB's expresses (D-Züge), which attracted a supplementary fare until 1982, ran on some sections as Eilzug trains. For example, nos. D 895 and D 564 from Saarbrücken to Munich, which ran via the South Palatinate railway (Südpfalzbahn) and were classified from Karlsruhe as an Eilzug service. The international express Donaukurier (the Danube Courier), D 222, from Vienna ran from Cologne to Dortmund as an Eilzug in the early 1980s.

Many Eilzüge, that were formed from D-Zug coaches ran from 1982 onwards in the D-Zug category, but without supplementary fares.

As a result of the reclassification of services following the foundation of Deutsche Bahn, the Eilzug was gradually abandoned to 1995 and replaced by other train services. There is no direct successor to the Eilzug; today, the Regional-Express is the closest comparable service to the Eilzug.

That said, the Albtal-Verkehrs-Gesellschaft (AVG) runs Eilzüge on several lines. For example, they work the Alb Valley Railway, the Hardt Railway, the Kraichgau Railway and the Murg Valley Railway as S-Bahn Eilzug services of the Karlsruhe Stadtbahn network and pass many stations there without stopping. In addition, the AVG also operates several trains (comparable to the Regionalbahnen) on the route from Karlsruhe Central - Bundenthal-Rumbach (May to October) as Eilzug services. These use diesel railcars.

== Austria ==
Austria had an Eilzug category until 9 December 2006. Austrian Eilzüge usually only had second class coaches. Eilzug trains with first class seats, which also handled long-distance services, were called Sprinters. Since 10 December 2006 the terms Eilzug and Sprinter have been dropped in favour of Regional-Express.

== Switzerland ==
The term Eilzug (in western Switzerland semi-direct) was used for the category of train in between express trains and ordinary passenger or stopping trains (which stopped at every station). That meant it could be used for fast passenger trains, as well as express services with numerous stops and which partly ran on branch lines. Many 'Eilzüge disappeared on the systematic reorganisation of the timetable, e.g. St. Gallen – Rapperswil – Zürich, with the concentration of services, e.g. Winterthur – Bülach – Zurzach – Basel, others were upgraded to tourist trains, e.g. the Voralpenexpress, and others run today as fast S-Bahn trains, e.g. S 44 on the Bern S-Bahn; the rest have mainly been reclassified as RegioExpress trains.

== See also ==
- Regional-Express
- Regionalbahn
- D-Zug
- Eilzugwagen
- Train categories in Europe
