= Open coach =

Type of railway passenger coach

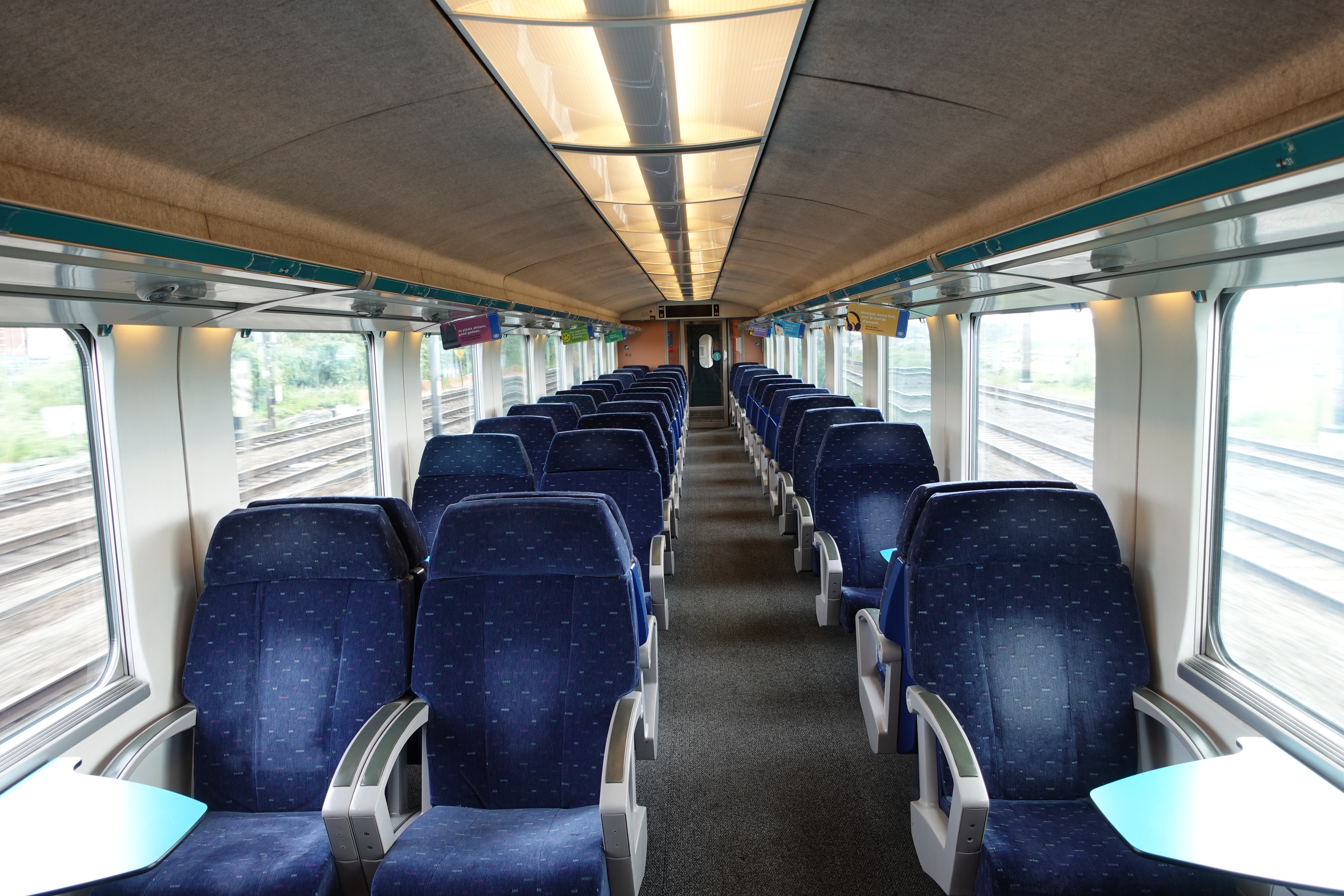
Interior of a Belgian open coach

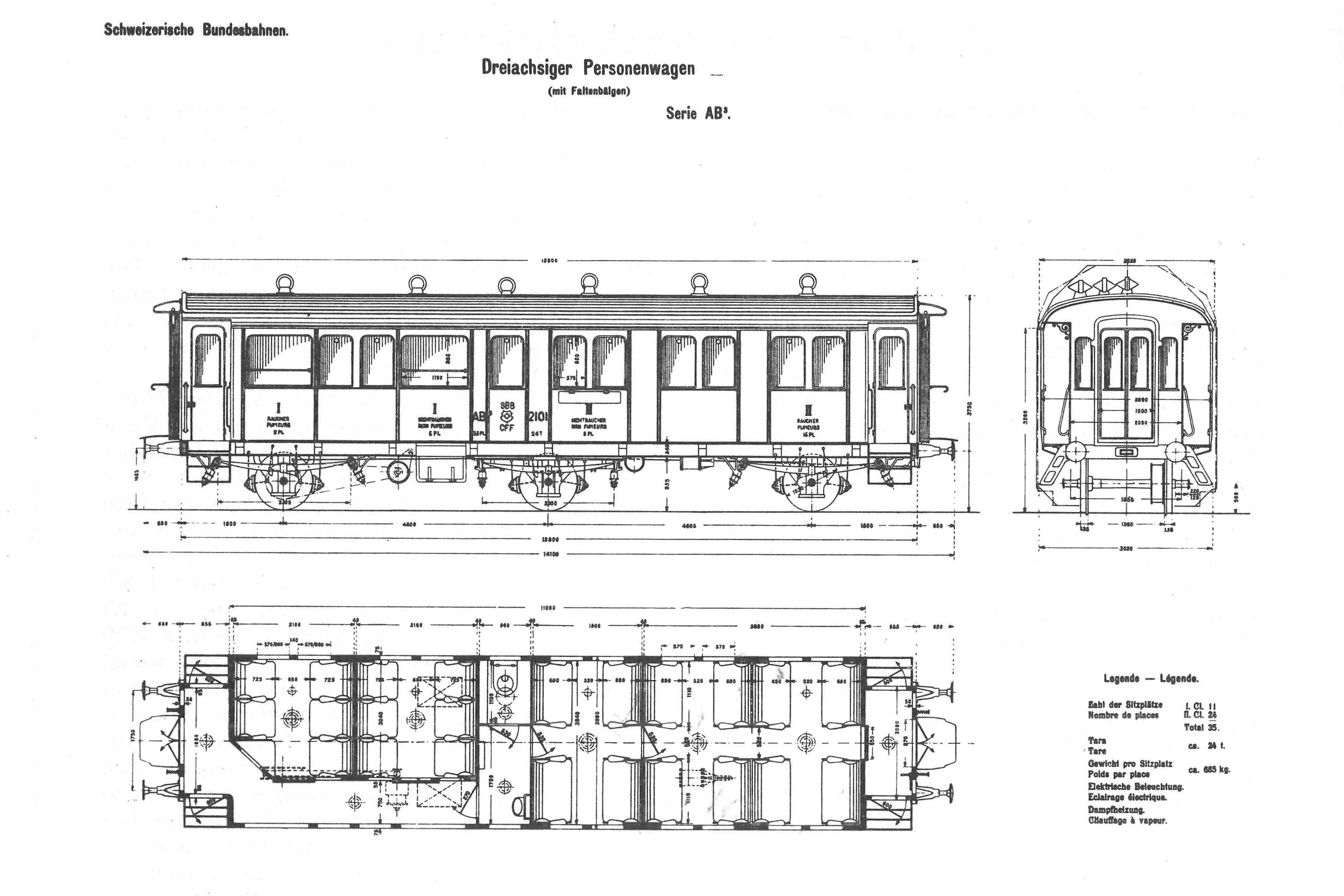
Comparison between open coach layout diagram (right) and compartments (left)

An open coach is a railway passenger coach that does not have compartments or other divisions within it and in which the train seats are arranged in one or more open plan areas with a centre aisle, in the manner of a coach bus or an airliner. The first open coaches appeared in the first half of the 19th century in the United States. The prototype for their design were the passenger cabins in the river steamers which were then widespread in America. As a result of their origin they were originally known in Europe as American system passenger coaches or American coaches (Personenwagen amerikanischen Systems or Amerikanerwagen) and the idea soon caught on in European railway companies. Initially they were mainly used for rural regional services, whilst urban local trains and local-distance services were dominated by compartment coaches. Several European railways such as the Royal Württemberg State Railways and the Swiss Northeastern Railway (Schweizerische Nordostbahn), however, preferred open coaches from the start for all types of train.

From the beginning of the 20th century open coaches became commonly used in local trains and began to spread to long-distance services too. High-speed trains often consist only of open coaches.

The seats in open coaches are either arranged in groups opposite one another or behind one another aeroplane-style, and sometimes seats can be rotated to face the direction of travel. Seats facing one another may be provided with fixed tables, seats arranged one behind the other often have folding trays in the back of the seat in front.

Open coaches are almost always equipped with gangways. Originally these were open platforms at the ends of the coach, but from the end of the 19th century the gangways have usually been vestibuled train protected with bellows or rubber connectors.

== Tramway ==
On tramways, an open coach is a six- or eight-wheeled driving car or trailer, which has an especially high volumetric capacity. Unlike the earlier, typical platform coaches, open coaches do not have partitions with doors between the entrance area and the actual passenger compartment. These coaches were popular in central Europe in the early 1950s and replaced the old (mainly four-wheeled) platform coaches. Whilst in West Germany, Austria and Switzerland this type of vehicle was rapidly replaced by articulated trams, in East Germany, the Tatra trams were the norm during the 1960s in many cities. The same was true in the former Eastern Bloc countries.

== See also ==
- Composite coach
- Corridor coach
