= Diamant (train) =

Express train between Bonn and Antwerp

Overview
- Service type: FT (1963–1965); Trans Europ Express (TEE) (1965–1976); Trans Europ Express (TEE) (1979–1981); Intercity (1988-1991)
- Status: Discontinued
- Locale: Germany; Belgium
- First service: 30 September 1962
- Last service: 1 June 1991
- Former operator: Deutsche Bundesbahn

Route
- Termini: Antwerp; Bonn
- Service frequency: Daily

On-board services
- Classes: 1st class only (1962–1981); 1st and 2nd class (1988–1991)

Technical
- Track gauge: 1,435 mm (4 ft 8 1/2 in)

The Diamant was an express train operated by the Deutsche Bundesbahn (DB), using different routes over the years. The name Diamant, Dutch for diamond, refers to the city of Antwerp, which is the European centre of diamond trade and has a diamond district. The initial service started in 1962 as a first-class-only FernTriebwagen linking the West-German capital Bonn with Antwerp, using a class DB Class VT 08 diesel multiple unit (DMU).

== Trans Europ Express ==
The Diamant was upgraded to Trans Europ Express (TEE) on 30 May 1965. The VT 08 was replaced by DB Class VT 11.5 DMUs formerly used in the TEE Helvetia, after the latter was changed to an electric locomotive-hauled consist. The route in Germany was altered as well; the Diamant no longer stopped at Bonn and started/ended in Dortmund instead.

In May 1966, only one year into the train's TEE era, its western terminus was changed from Antwerp to Brussels (South/Midi), disconnecting the "Diamond" (Diamant) from the place that had been the inspiration for its name. Many alterations in the route followed during the electrification works along the route, sometimes reaching as far east as Hannover. On 29 May 1976, the Diamant was withdrawn. The Diamant was reintroduced on 27 May 1979, again as a TEE but no longer an international service, instead taking over the Munich – Hamburg section of the Blauer Enzian. It operated on Mondays to Fridays only. After two years this second Diamant was withdrawn from service.

== InterCity ==
The third Diamant was a two-class DB Intercity service linking Hamburg with Stuttgart via Cologne, from 29 May 1988 until 1 Juni 1991. Although normally a non-international service, the IC Diamant was extended to (and from) Innsbruck on Saturdays during some periods, including at least January through May 1991.

== Works cited ==
- Publicrelations UIC (1972). TEE (in Dutch). Paris: Union International des Chemins de Fer.
- Hajt, Jörg (2001). Das grosse TEE Buch (in German). Bonn/Königswinter: Heel Verlag. ISBN 3-89365-948-X.
- Goette, Peter (2008). TEE-Züge in Deutschland (in German). Freiburg: EK-Verlag. ISBN 978-3-88255-698-8.
- Mertens, Maurice; Malaspina, Jean-Pierre (2007). La Légende des Trans Europ Express (in French). Vannes: LR Presse. ISBN 978-29-036514-5-9.
