= L'Arbalète =

L'Arbalète, or Arbalète (English: Crossbow) may refer to:

- L'Arbalète (train), an express train formerly operating in France and Switzerland
- L'Arbalète, the original title of the French film released as Asphalt Warriors in the UK or The Syringe internationally
- EFW N-20.02 Arbalète, a Swiss aircraft design
- Payen Arbalète, a French homebuilt aircraft design
