= Van Beethoven (train) =

Former train in Germany and the Netherlands

Overview
- Service type: Trans Europ Express (TEE) (1972–1979); InterCity(IC) (1979– 2002)
- Locale: Germany; Netherlands
- Predecessor: TEE Rhein - Main
- First service: 28 May 1972
- Last service: 14 December 2002
- Current operator(s): Deutsche Bundesbahn; Deutsche Bahn

Technical
- Track gauge: 1,435 mm (4 ft 8 1/2 in)
- Electrification: 1500 V DC (Netherlands); 15 kV 16,7 Hz (Germany)
Route map
- TEE Van Beethoven in Intercity network

The Van Beethoven was an international train linking the Dutch capital Amsterdam and the West German capital Bonn. The train was named after the Bonn-born composer Ludwig van Beethoven.

The Van Beethoven was the successor of the TEE Rhein–Main on the same route and schedule. The route of the Rhein–Main was shortened to Amsterdam - Bonn in the autumn of 1971, thus ending the relation with the Main eventually resulting in renaming the TEE to Van Beethoven. Travellers wanting to go to Frankfurt am Main in the evening could proceed from Bonn using the TEE Saphir arriving in Frankfurt eight minutes later than the former Rhein-Main. On request of German members of parliament the route was extended to Nürnberg in 1976, resulting in an arrival around 1:30 a.m.

In 1978, the Deutsche Bundesbahn decided to reinstate the Amsterdam Frankfurt service with timed connections to Nürnberg arriving shortly before midnight (23:58). On 26 May 1979, the Van Beethoven was converted in a two-class InterCity. The Van Beethoven was continued as international service until 1983 and afterwards served several different routes in Germany until the end of 2002.

== Works cited ==
- Hajt, Jörg (2001). Das grosse TEE Buch (in German). Bonn/Königswinter: Heel Verlag. ISBN 3-89365-948-X.
- Mertens, Maurice; Malaspina, Jean-Pierre (2007). La Légende des Trans Europ Express (in French). Vannes: LR Presse. ISBN 978-29-036514-5-9.
- Goette, Peter (2008). TEE-Züge in Deutschland (in German). Freiburg: EK-Verlag. ISBN 978-3-88255-698-8.
