= Ligure =

Ligure may refer to:

- The Ligurian language, spoken in Liguria in northern Italy
- Ligure (train), a Trans Europ Express (TEE) that ran between Milano C and Marseille / Avignon
- In the Biblical book of Exodus, a stone in the third row of the High Priest's Breastplate.

== See also ==
- Ligures, an ancient people of Liguria
- ('Ligure' is a subsidiary part of several Italian place names)
