= Watteau (disambiguation) =

Antoine Watteau (1684–1721) was a French painter.

Watteau may also refer to:

== People with the surname ==
- Louis Joseph Watteau (1731–1798), French painter, nephew of Jean-Antoine
- François-Louis-Joseph Watteau (1758–1823), French painter, son of Louis Joseph

== Other uses ==
- Watteau (train), a Paris-Tourcoing express train 1978–1995
- Watteau dress, a stylistic school most influential in the design of gowns and their components

== See also ==
- Watteau in Venice, a novel
- Watto, a fictional character in the Star Wars universe
