= Faidherbe =

Faidherbe may refer to:

- Faidherbe (train), a former train in France
- ST Faidherbe, a Senegalese tugboat

== People with the surname ==
- Henri Brosselard-Faidherbe (1855–1893), French military officer and explorer, the stepson of Louis Faidherbe
- Louis Faidherbe (1818–1889), French general and Governor of Senegal
