= Gambrinus (disambiguation) =

Gambrinus is a legendary European culture hero associated with beer.

Gambrinus may also refer to:

- Gambrinus (beer), a Czech beer
- Gambrinus (beetle), a genus of click beetles in the family Elateridae
- Gambrinus (train), a former German train
- Gambrinus Brewing Co., a defunct American brewery
- the Gambrinus Company, which owns the Spoetzl Brewery
- Gambrinus liga, now the Czech First League, a Czech association football competition
- Caffè Gambrinus, a cafè in Naples
- King Gambrinus (sculpture), 19th century zinc statue used on brewery buildings, and a 1967 sculpture
