= Brabant (train) =

European passenger train (1963–1995)

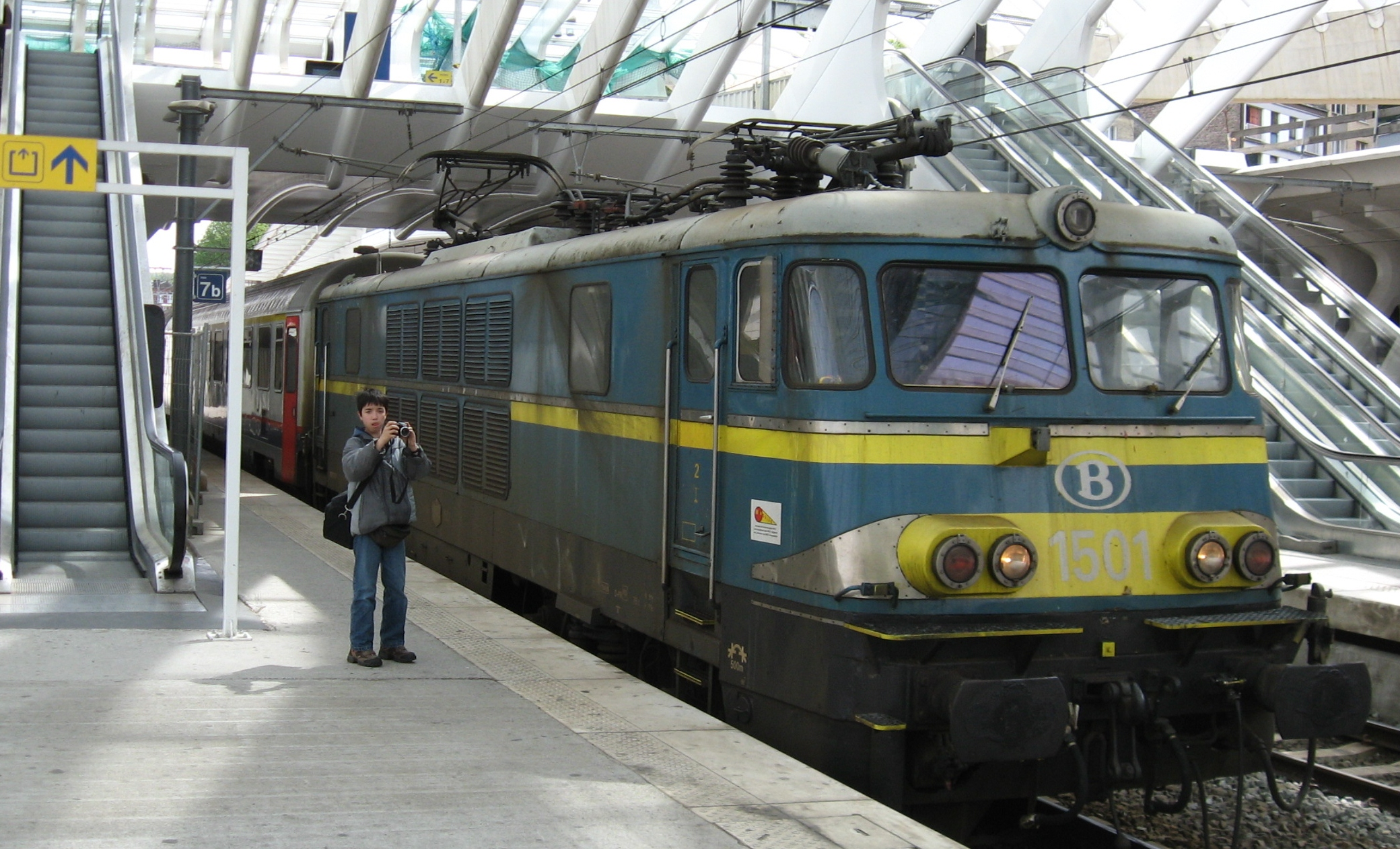
- Class 15 locomotive

Overview
- Service type: Trans Europ Express (TEE) (1963–1984); InterCity (IC) (1984–1987); EuroCity (EC) (1987–1993); Trans Europ Express (TEE) (1993–1995)
- Status: Replaced by TGV (Thalys)
- Locale: France; Belgium
- First service: 26 May 1963
- Last service: 23 January 1995
- Former operators: NMBS / SNCF

Route
- Termini: Gare du Nord; Brussels-South
- Stops: none
- Distance travelled: 310 km
- Service frequency: Daily

Technical
- Track gauge: 1,435 mm (4 ft 8 1/2 in)
- Electrification: 1500 V DC (France); 3000 V DC (Belgium)

The Brabant was an express train that linked Gare du Nord in Paris, France, with Brussels-South in Brussels, Belgium. The train was named after the historical Duchy of Brabant of which Brussels was the capital.

== Trans Europ Express ==
The Brabant was introduced in the TEE-network to cope with the rising number of passengers between Paris and Brussels. This fourth TEE service between the two cities was planned to be the first through electric service on this railway line. However, due to the Big Freeze of 1963, the overhead lines works were behind schedule and at 26 May 1963 the service was started with a northbound only DMU, detached from the existing TEE Île de France.

=== Rolling Stock ===
Until 1 September 1963 the Brabant was ridden by RGP 825-multiple units of SNCF. This was northbound only because the used multiple unit was, after arriving in Brussels, coupled with the southbound TEE Île de France. After completing the electrification the formation changed into a locomotive hauled electric train, riding in both directions.

==== Locomotives ====
Initially the train was hauled by a SNCF class 26000, replaced by the Belgian class 15 at 2 August 1964. Ten years later, at 29 September 1974, the technically identical SNCF class CC 40100 and Belgian class 18, replaced the class 15 locomotives.

==== Coaches ====
Initially normal DEV A9 coaches were used, which meant a decline in comfort compared to the RGP 825. At 2 August 1964 the comfort was upgraded to TEE level again with the introduction of the PBA (Paris Brussel Amsterdam) class coaches.

=== Route and timetable ===
The TEE service started with trainnumber TEE 128 (Paris - Brussel), at 1 September 1963 the trainnumber TEE 119 was assigned to the southbound train. At 26 May 1967 the train was renumbered, the northbound service became TEE 64, the southbound service became TEE 61. At 23 May 1971 a new renumbering was implemented. All TEE services between Amsterdam and Paris got sequential numbers from 80 up to 87. The odd-numbers for northbound trains, the even-numbers for southbound trains. Within these numbers TEE 83 and TEE 84 were assigned to TEE Brabant.

TEE 84	country	station	km	TEE 83
5:18 p.m.	Belgium	Brussel Zuid	0	2:05 p.m.
**:**	Belgium	Mons	55	**:**
**:**	France	St Quentin	156	**:**
7:43 p.m.	France	Paris Nord	310	11:45

At 3 June 1984 the Brabant was downgraded to a two-class intercity service retaining the trainnumbers as IC 83 and IC 84.

== EuroCity ==
The service was continued as EuroCity EC 83 and EC 86 from 31 May 1987 until 23 May 1993. As the TEE the EuroCity was a nonstop service between Paris and Brussels. The class PBA coaches were partly converted to second-class coaches. The coaches were refurbished with a second-class interior and the red band with TEE lettering on the outside was replaced with a green band. For legal reasons the train was classed again as TEE between May 1993 until the opening of the Paris - Brussels High-speed railway on 23 January 1995.

== Works cited ==
- Werbeamt der DB (1971). Vorfahrt in Europa, TEE 1971/72 (in German). Frankfurt am Main: Deutsche Bundesbahn.
- Publicrelations UIC (1972). TEE (in Dutch). Paris: Union International des Chemins de Fer.
- Hajt, Jörg (2001). Das grosse TEE Buch (in German). Bonn/Königswinter: Heel Verlag. ISBN 3-89365-948-X.
- Mertens, Maurice; Malaspina, Jean-Pierre (2007). La Légende des Trans Europ Express (in French). Vannes: LR Presse. ISBN 978-29-036514-5-9.
