= Cycnus (train) =

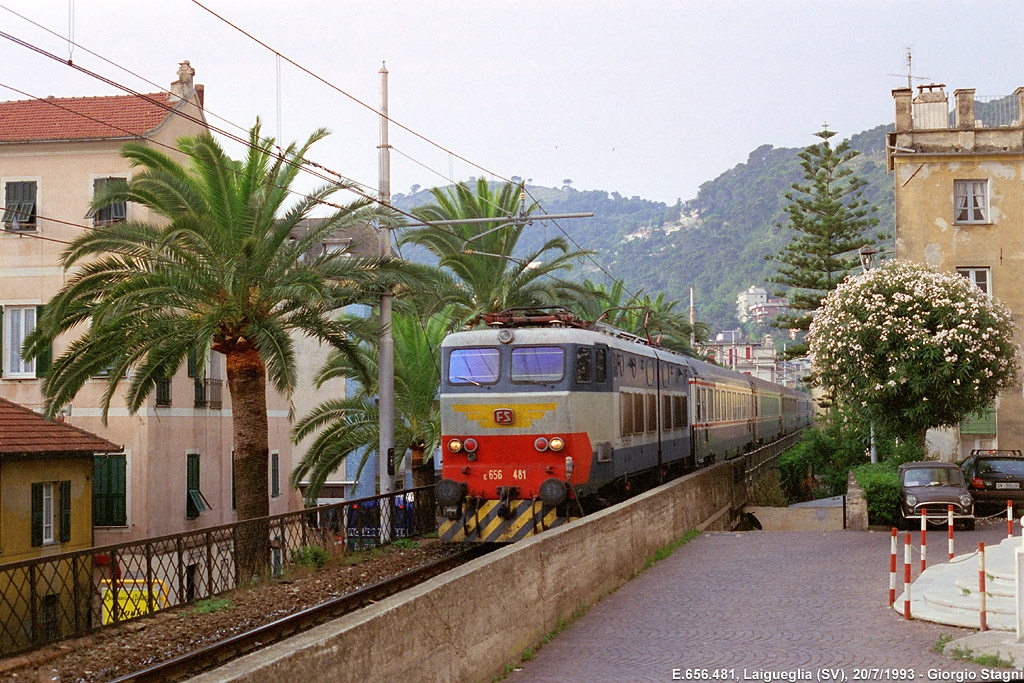

Overview
- Service type: Trans Europ Express (TEE) (1973–1978); InterCity (IC) (1978– )
- Locale: Italy
- First service: 30 September 1973
- Current operator(s): Ferrovie dello Stato (FS)

Route
- Termini: Milano C Ventimiglia / Genoa Principe
- Service frequency: Daily
- Line(s) used: Milan–Genoa; Genoa–Ventimiglia

On-board services
- Class(es): First class-only (TEE); First and second class (IC)

Technical
- Track gauge: 1,435 mm (4 ft 8 1/2 in)
- Electrification: 3000 V DC

The Cycnus was an express train operated by Ferrovie dello Stato, linking Milan with Ventimiglia, Italy. Cycnus literally means swan, but more likely the name refers to the mythological King of Liguria, the region the train served.

== History ==
The Cycnus was introduced on 30 September 1973 in order to improve the first class-only Trans Europ Express (TEE) service along the Ligurian coast. The schedule was designed as a "mirror" of the TEE Ligure, resulting in a very early departure from the French-Italian border in Ventimiglia and returning from Milan just after midnight. While the Ligure had constant loading figures, the Cycnus ran almost empty at the beginning of the week, but had to be extended to 11 coaches on Fridays.

Over time, passenger numbers on the Cycnus dropped and the extra coaches were scrapped from the winter of 1975/76. Eventually it the continued running a first class-only train appeared to be too much of a financial burden, and the Cycnus was converted to a two class InterCity service on 29 May 1978.

On 14 December 2003 the route was shortened to the Milan - Genoa portion.

== See also ==
- History of rail transport in Italy
- List of named passenger trains of Europe

== Works cited ==
- Hajt, Jörg (2001). Das grosse TEE Buch (in German). Bonn/Königswinter: Heel Verlag. ISBN 3-89365-948-X.
- Mertens, Maurice; Malaspina, Jean-Pierre (2007). La Légende des Trans Europ Express (in French). Vannes: LR Presse. ISBN 978-29-036514-5-9.
