= Le Lyonnais =

Le Lyonnais may refer to:

- Lyonnais, a historical province of France, which owes its name to the city of Lyon
- Le Lyonnais (train), an express train that linked Paris and Lyon in France from 1968 to 1981
- Les Lyonnais, French title of the 2011 film A Gang Story

== See also ==
- Lyonnais (disambiguation)
