= Prinz Eugen (train) =

Overview
- Service type: Trans Europ Express (TEE) (1971–1978); InterCity (IC) (1978–1987); EuroCity (EC) (1987–1998); Intercity-Express (ICE) (1998–2004)
- Status: No longer a named train
- Locale: Germany; Austria
- First service: 26 September 1971
- Last service: 2004
- Former operator(s): Deutsche Bundesbahn / Deutsche Bahn (DB); ÖBB

Route
- Termini: Bremen Hbf / Hannover Hbf / Hamburg-Altona / Kiel Hbf; Wien Westbf
- Service frequency: Daily

Technical
- Track gauge: 1,435 mm (4 ft 8 1/2 in)
- Electrification: 15 kV AC, 16.7 Hz
Route map
- The original route of the Prinz Eugen (Bremen Hbf–Wien Westbf), 1971.

The Prinz Eugen was an express train that linked northern Germany with Wien Westbf in Vienna, Austria. Introduced in 1971, it was operated by the Deutsche Bundesbahn / Deutsche Bahn (DB) and the Austrian Federal Railways (ÖBB).

The train was named after Prince Eugene of Savoy, who was one of the most successful military commanders in modern European history, rising to the highest offices of state at the Imperial court in Vienna.

== History ==
Over the years, the northern terminus, route, classification and formation (consist) of the Prinz Eugen varied significantly. However, the route always included the main line between Würzburg Hbf, in Germany, and Wien Westbf, in Vienna, via Passau Hbf, on the border between Germany and Austria.

During the train's time as a Trans Europ Express (TEE), its route was originally Bremen – Würzburg – Nuremberg – Vienna, but in 1976 was altered to Hannover – Cologne – Frankfurt – Würzburg – Nuremberg – Vienna. It was the only TEE route ever to serve Vienna. In the 1970s, it was one of just three TEEs to run within Austria, the others being the Mediolanum and the Blauer Enzian, but later, a short-lived, summer-only branch of the TEE Rheingold terminated in Salzburg, in 1985 and 1986 only.

The Prinz Eugen's final day as a TEE was 27 May 1978, and on the following day it was reclassified as a two-class InterCity (IC). This train, which initially kept the same route, was first-class-only between Hannover and Frankfurt, and carried both first- and second-class cars between Frankfurt and Vienna. On 1 June 1980, the route of the IC Prinz Eugen was changed to Hamburg – Würzburg – Nuremberg – Vienna. This was almost identical to the train's 1971–1976 route, except north of Hannover, where the route now ran to/from Hamburg instead of Bremen.

On 31 May 1987, the Prinz Eugen was included in the then-newly introduced EuroCity (EC) network. Its route remained unchanged until 2 June 1991, when it again returned to a routing via Cologne and Frankfurt, now running Hamburg – Bremen – Cologne – Frankfurt – Würzburg – Nuremberg – Vienna.

On 24 May 1998, the Prinz Eugen became an Intercity-Express (ICE) train, still connecting Hamburg with Vienna but reverting again to a more direct routing, Hamburg – Hannover – Würzburg – Nuremberg – Vienna.

The Prinz Eugen ceased to be a named train in 2004.

== See also ==
- History of rail transport in Austria
- History of rail transport in Germany
- List of named passenger trains of Europe
