= Lyonnaise =

Lyonnaise or Lyonnais may refer to:

- Lyonnais (masculine) and Lyonnaise (feminine), something from or relating to Lyon, a city in France
- Gaule Lyonnaise, French name of Gallia Lugdunensis, a province of the Roman Empire
- Lyonnais, a historical province of France
- Lyonnaise cuisine
- Lyonnaise, cooked with onions
  - Lyonnaise potatoes
  - Sauce lyonnaise
- Lyonnaise (grape), another name for the Swiss wine grape Räuschling

== See also ==
- Boule lyonnaise, a boules-type game
- Lyonesse (disambiguation)
- Le Lyonnais (disambiguation)
