= Bacchus (train) =

Train in Germany

Overview
- Service type: Trans Europ Express (TEE) (1979–1980); InterCity (IC) (1985–1991) (1994–1998)
- Status: Discontinued
- Locale: Germany
- First service: 28 May 1979
- Last service: 23 May 1998
- Former operator(s): Deutsche Bundesbahn / Deutsche Bahn

Route
- Service frequency: Weekdays

Technical
- Track gauge: 1,435 mm (4 ft 8 1/2 in)
- Electrification: 15 kV 16.7 Hz

The Bacchus was an express train in Germany, initially linking Dortmund and Munich. The train was named after the Roman God of wine, although for most of its existence it linked two cities famous for producing beer.

== History ==
=== Trans Europ Express ===
In 1971 the Deutsche Bundesbahn started an inner German network of first-class only InterCity services modeled after the Trans Europ Express (TEE) criteria, but more frequent than the TEE, one train per hour instead of one train a day. During the 1970s the introduction of second-class coaches in the Intercities was proposed and tested on some routes, resulting in the IC79 project.

The IC79 project was implemented at 28 May 1979, but seven inner German services, including a new train, the Bacchus, stayed first-class-only and were classed as TEE to distinguish them from the two-class InterCity.

The TEE Bacchus was withdrawn only one year after the introduction. As it had run only on weekdays, Bacchus earned itself a record as the shortest-lived TEE, with 254 days of service.

=== InterCity ===
The Bacchus was revived as two class InterCity on 2 June 1985 on the same route until 1 June 1991. A third Bacchus ran between Stuttgart and Münster from 29 May 1994 until 23 May 1998.

== See also ==
- History of rail transport in Germany
- List of named passenger trains of Europe

== Works cited ==
- Hajt, Jörg (2001). Das grosse TEE Buch (in German). Bonn/Königswinter: Heel Verlag. ISBN 3-89365-948-X.
- Mertens, Maurice; Malaspina, Jean-Pierre (2007). La Légende des Trans Europ Express (in French). Vannes: LR Presse. ISBN 978-29-036514-5-9.
- Goette, Peter (2008). TEE-Züge in Deutschland (in German). Freiburg: EK-Verlag. ISBN 978-3-88255-698-8.
