= Le Rhodanien (train) =

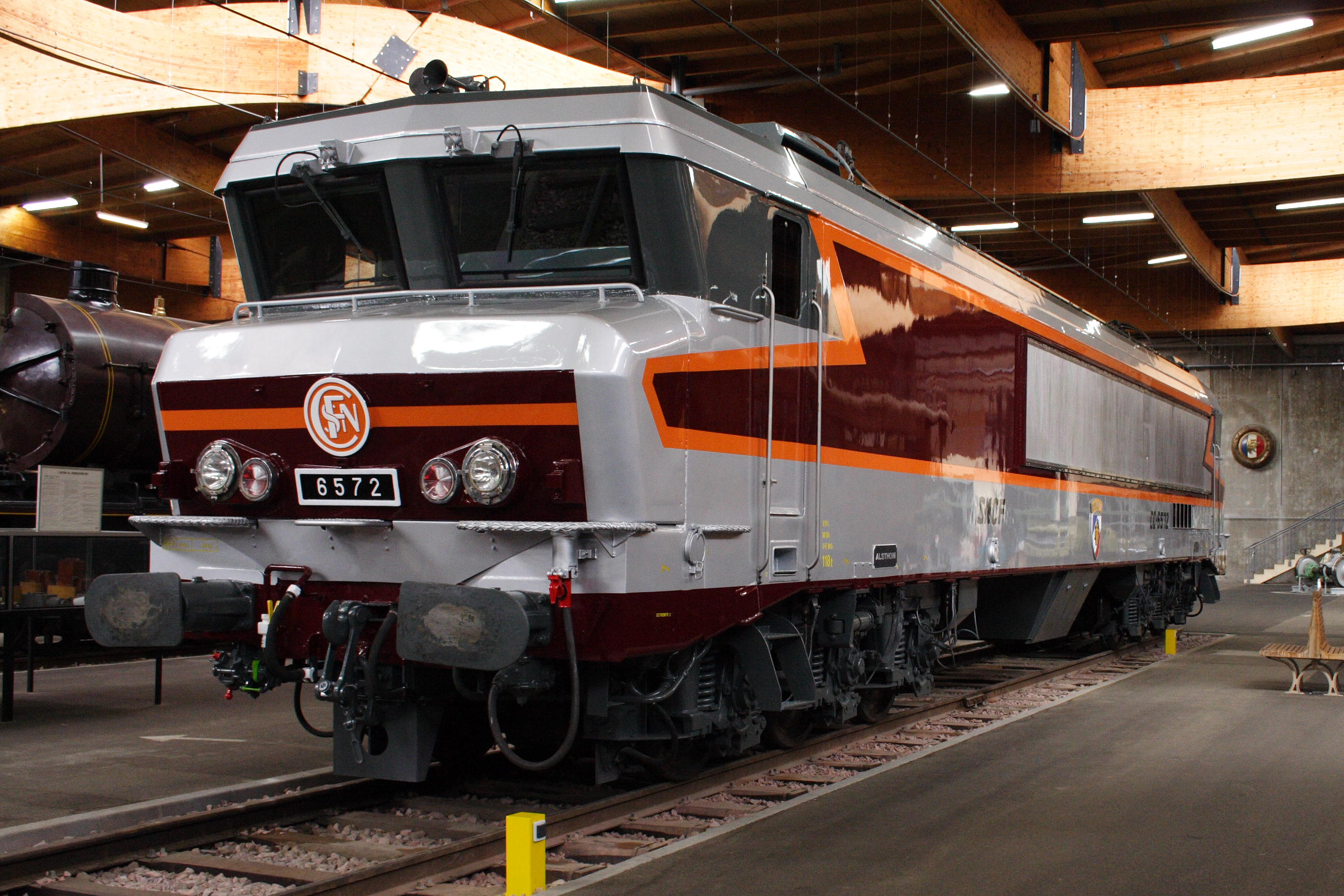
- A preserved Class CC 6500 locomotive

Overview
- Service type: Rapide (1964–1971); Trans Europ Express (TEE) (1971–1978)
- Status: Discontinued
- Locale: France (1964–1978); Switzerland (1964–1971)
- First service: 31 May 1964
- Last service: 29 September 1978
- Former operator(s): SNCF

Route
- Termini: Genève-Cornavin (1964–1971); Paris-Gare de Lyon (1971–1978); Marseille-Saint-Charles
- Train number(s): TEE 17, 16 (1971–1978)

On-board services
- Class(es): First-class-only (1971–1978)

Technical
- Rolling stock: SNCF Class X 2770 (1964–1971); SNCF Class CC 6500; DEV Inox coaches (1971–1978)
- Track gauge: 1,435 mm (4 ft 8 1/2 in)
- Electrification: 1.5 kV DC

Le Rhodanien, or the Rhodanien, was an express train with its southern terminus in Marseille, France. Operated by the Société Nationale des Chemins de fer français (SNCF), it was named using the French language adjective derived from the Rhône river; the name alludes, amongst other things, to the river, its valley, and the dialect of the Franco-Provençal language that is spoken there.

The train had two distinct eras. Between 1964 and 1971, it was an international Rapide linking Geneva, Switzerland with Marseille. In 1971, the train's route and classification were radically altered, and Le Rhodanien became a first-class-only domestic Trans Europ Express (TEE) running between Paris and Marseille. It was discontinued in 1978.

== Formation (consist) ==
The Geneva–Marseille Rhodanien was made up of SNCF Class X 2770 diesel multiple unit railcars, in a two- to five-car formation, in each case with a power car at each end. These vehicles had previously been used on TEE trains.

The Paris–Marseille train was formed of passenger cars, hauled by an SNCF 1.5 kV DC, Class CC 6500 electric locomotive. The passenger cars were a rake of SNCF Mistral 69-type DEV Inox coaches, and were initially an A4Dtux, three A8tu, two A8u and a Vr. From 1 June 1975, the Paris–Marseille train was augmented by one or two extra coaches when required.

While Le Rhodanien was operating as a TEE, its dining car was staffed by the Compagnie Internationale des Wagons-Lits (CIWL).

== See also ==
- History of rail transport in France
- List of named passenger trains of Europe
