= Aurora (Trans Europ Express) =

Overview
- Service type: Trans Europ Express (TEE; 1974–75); Rapido (1975–87)
- Locale: Italy
- First service: 26 May 1974
- Former operator(s): Ferrovie dello Stato

Route
- Termini: Rome; Reggio di Calabria

Technical
- Track gauge: 1,435 mm (4 ft 8 1/2 in)
- Electrification: 3000 V DC (Italy)

The Aurora was a domestic Trans Europ Express in Italy linking Rome with Reggio di Calabria. The train was named after the Roman goddess of dawn, referring to the train's early morning departure from Rome.

== Trans Europ Express ==
The Aurora was based on existing first-class only Rapidos running between Rome and Naples. In 1974 the service was extended to Reggio di Calabria and upgraded to Trans Europ Express. The southbound service used the schedule of Rapido 893, the northbound service the schedule of Rapido 882 already running from Reggio to Rome. Despite the scenic route along the Tyrrhenian Sea between Naples and Reggio di Calabria, loading figures on this stretch were very low and consequently the Aurora was downgraded to a two-class Rapido after only 371 days as TEE on 1 June 1975. On 1 June 1980 the service was extended to Palermo using the train ferry to cross the Strait of Messina. On 30 May 1987 the rapido Aurora was withdrawn from service.

TEE 89	country	station	km	TEE 88
07:20	Italy	Roma Termini	0	22:05
08:54	Italy	Napoli Mergellina	209	20:21
09:04	Italy	Napoli Piazza Garibaldi	214	20:11
	Italy	Salerno	268	
	Italy	Maratea	407	
	Italy	Lamezia Terme	546	
	Italy	Gioia Tauro	638	
	Italy	Villa San Giovanni	675	
	Italy	Reggio Lido	682	
13:55	Italy	Reggio Calabria	684	15:25
