= Friedrich Schiller (train) =

Overview
- Service type: InterCity (IC) (1972–1979); Trans Europ Express (TEE) (1979–1982); InterCity(IC) (1985–2001)
- Status: Discontinued
- Locale: Germany
- First service: 1 October 1972
- Last service: 9 June 2001
- Former operator(s): Deutsche Bundesbahn

Route
- Service frequency: Weekdays

Technical
- Track gauge: 1,435 mm (4 ft 8 1/2 in)
- Electrification: 15 kV 16,7 Hz (Germany)

The Friedrich Schiller was an express train in Germany, initially linking Düsseldorf and Stuttgart. The train was named after the philosopher and playwright Friedrich Schiller.

== History ==
In 1971, the Deutsche Bundesbahn started an inner German network of first-class-only InterCity services modeled after the TEE criteria, but more frequent than the TEE, one train per hour instead of one train a day. At 1 October 1972, the Friedrich Schiller was added to this network, initially linking Stuttgart and Düsseldorf. The route was extended northward to Dortmund on 1 June 1975. During the 1970s, the introduction of second-class coaches in the Intercities was proposed and tested on some routes, resulting in the IC79 project. One of these "second-class tests" was carried out with the Friedrich Schiller in the summer of 1977. The route was extended farther north to Hamburg in the summer of 1978. The IC79 project was implemented at 28 May 1979 but the Friedrich Schiller was converted to a first-class-only train and classed as TEE to distinguish it from the two class InterCity. After three years as TEE, the TEE Friedrich Schiller was withdrawn and replaced by other Intercities.

== Revival ==
At 2 June 1985 Friedrich Schiller returned in the timetable and ran between Munich and Dortmund until 1 June 1991. Between 2 June 1991 and 22 May 1993 the Friedrich Schiller was back on his original route and from 23 May 1993 until the withdrawal on 9 June 2001 it ran between Munich and Dortmund again.

== Works cited ==
- Hajt, Jörg (2001). Das grosse TEE Buch (in German). Bonn/Königswinter: Heel Verlag. ISBN 3-89365-948-X.
- Mertens, Maurice; Malaspina, Jean-Pierre (2007). La Légende des Trans Europ Express (in French). Vannes: LR Presse. ISBN 978-29-036514-5-9.
- Goette, Peter (2008). TEE-Züge in Deutschland (in German). Freiburg: EK-Verlag. ISBN 978-3-88255-698-8.
