= Île de France (train) =

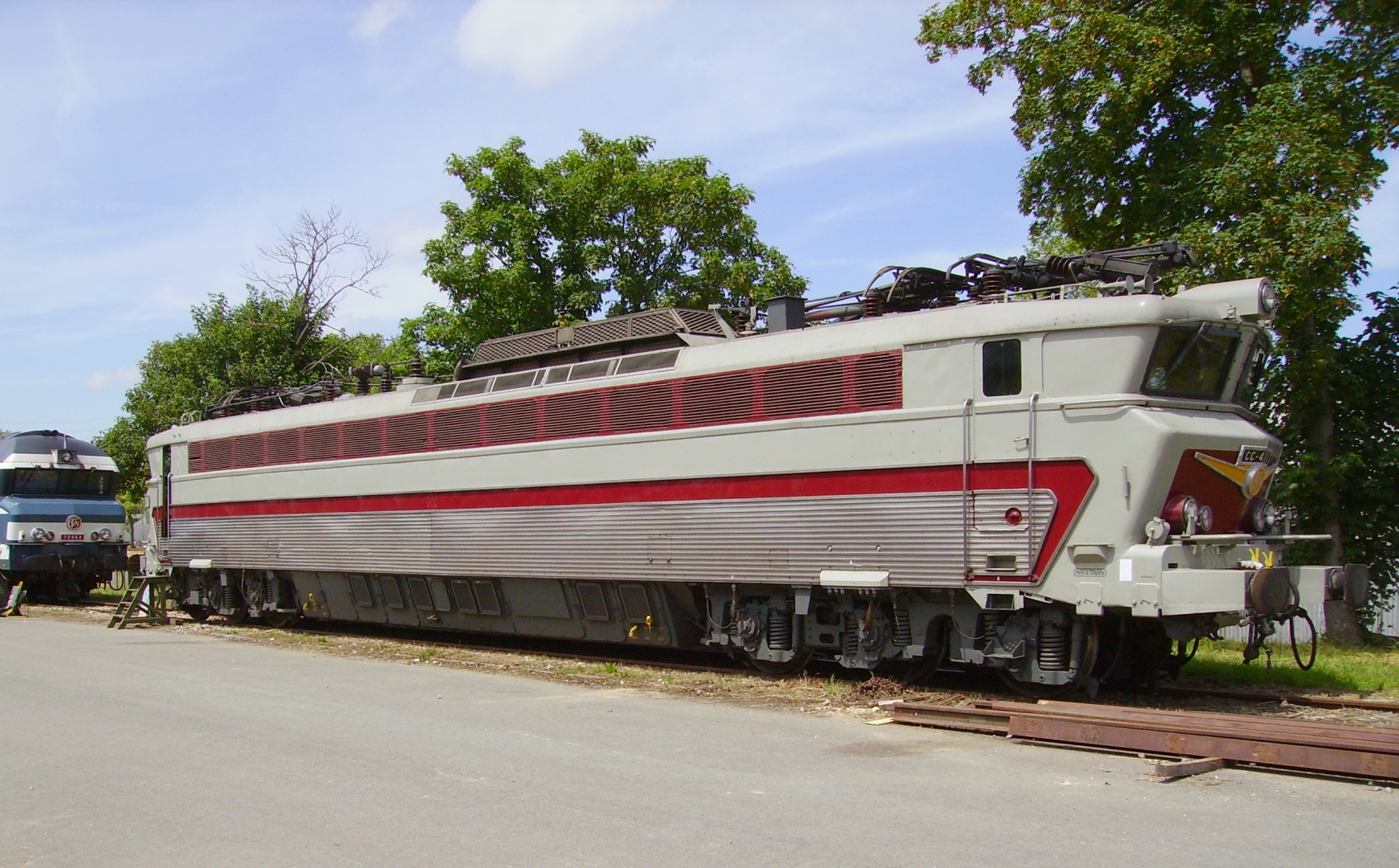
- Quadruple-voltage locomotive class CC 40100

Overview
- Service type: Trans Europ Express (TEE) (1957–1987); EuroCity (1987–1993); Trans Europ Express (TEE) (1993–1995)
- Status: Discontinued
- Locale: France; Belgium; Netherlands
- First service: 2 June 1957
- Last service: 26 May 1995
- Successor: Thalys
- Former operator(s): SNCF

Route
- Termini: Paris; Amsterdam
- Distance travelled: 543 km
- Service frequency: Daily

Technical
- Track gauge: 1,435 mm (4 ft 8 1/2 in)
Route map
- PBA routes; TEE red, Thalys blue

The Île de France was an international express train on the PBA route (Paris–Brussels–Amsterdam). The train was named after the French region surrounding Paris.

== Trans Europ Express ==
The Île de France was the French share of the initial Trans Europ Express (TEE) services on the PBA route. On 2 June 1957 the TEE services on the PBA route started with three trains. One of them, the TEE L'Oiseau Bleu, only served the Paris–Brussels section; the other, the TEE Étoile du Nord, linked Amsterdam with Paris. Both were existing services upgraded to TEE and were operated by Dutch and Belgian railways. The Île de France was introduced as the "mirror" of the Étoile du Nord, that started in the morning in Amsterdam and returned to Amsterdam just before dinner. In order to have a morning service from Paris to Amsterdam, returning from Amsterdam in the evening the Île de France was added at the start of the TEE network.

=== Rolling stock ===
The SNCF initially used their RGP-825 diesel multiple units for this new TEE service. Meanwhile, the French started the development of locomotive-hauled TEE coaches and multi-system electric locomotives. The Swiss were the first to introduce quadruple-voltage TEE trainsets in 1961; the French presented their class CC 40100 in 1964. On 31 May 1964 the Île de France was the first locomotive-hauled TEE to use the specially made Inox–PBA coaches. On 2 August 1964 all TEE services on the PBA-route received Inox-PBA stock operated by the SNCF and NMBS. This stock stayed in use until the opening of the Paris–Brussels high-speed railway in 1995. However, some modifications took place between 1983 and 1987, when a part of the coaches were refurbished to 2nd class and received a green band instead of a red (TEE) band above the windows.

=== Route and timetable ===
The timetable remained nearly unchanged during the whole period of service, although in 1984 the service was shortened to the Paris–Brussels part.

TEE 86	Country	Station	Km	TEE 81
18:02	Netherlands	Amsterdam CS	0	12:28
18:40	Netherlands	Den Haag HS	63	11:46
18:56	Netherlands	Rotterdam CS	86	11:29
19:33	Netherlands	Roosendaal	144	10:50
19:57	Belgium	Antwerpen Oost	183	10:25
20:26	Belgium	Brussel Noord	227	09:55
20:32	Belgium	Brussel Zuid	233	09:43
**:**	Belgium	Mons	288	**:**
**:**	France	St Quentin	389	**:**
23:04	France	Paris Nord	543	07:23

== EuroCity ==
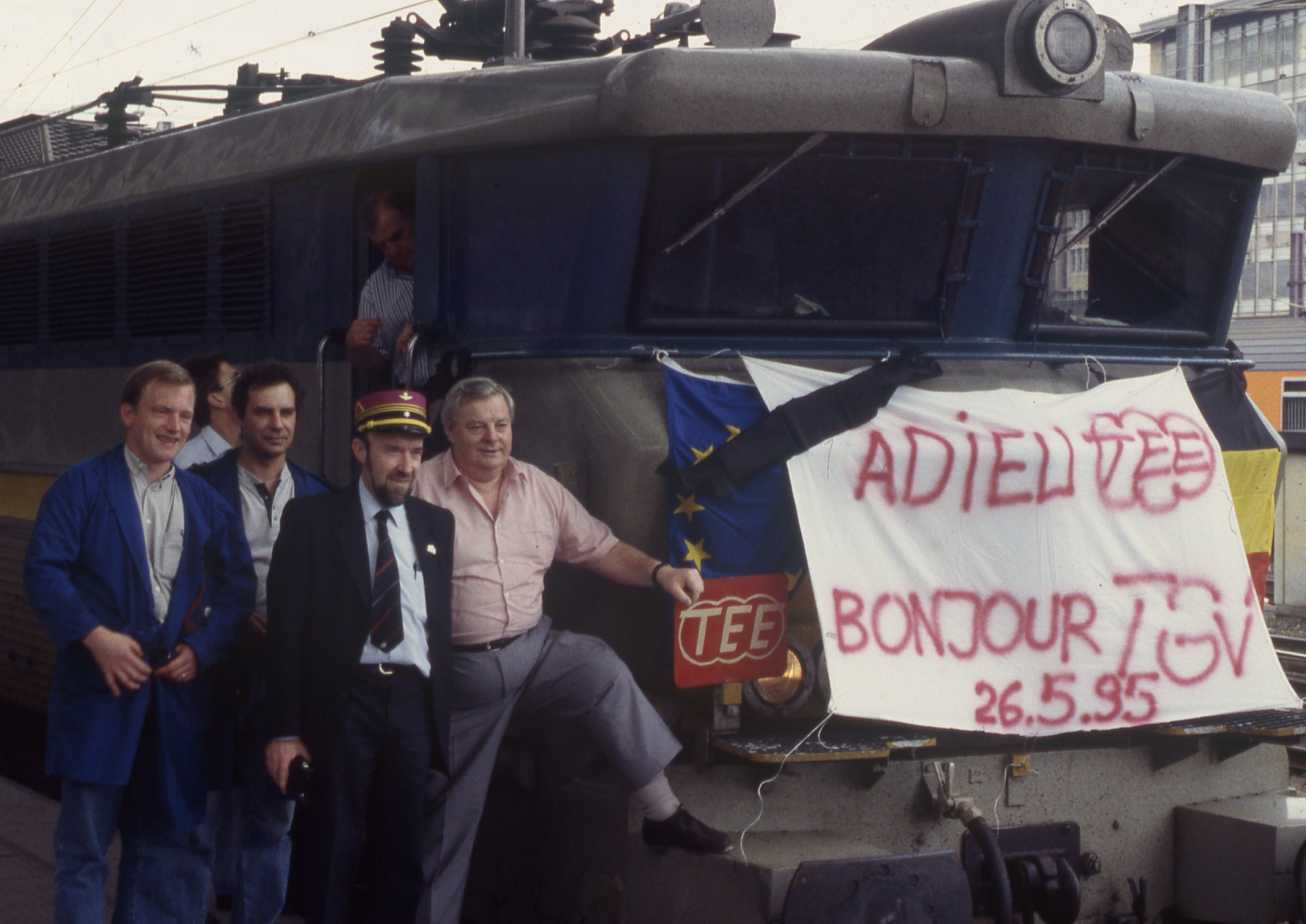
Unofficial ceremony for the last TEE Île de France on 26 May 1995 at Brussels-South railway station

In 1987 the Île de France was, like the other PBA TEE services, integrated into the new EuroCity network.

On 23 May 1993 the EuroCity services between Paris and Brussels were classified as TEE again. After the opening of the LGV Nord on 23 January 1995, the Brussels–Paris service was withdrawn and by the time this highspeed railway was fully operational on 26 May 1995 the opposite service was withdrawn too.

== Works cited ==
- Werbeamt der DB (1971). Vorfahrt in Europa, TEE 1971/72 (in German). Frankfurt am Main: Deutsche Bundesbahn.
- Publicrelations UIC (1972). TEE (in Dutch). Paris: Union International des Chemins de Fer.
- Hajt, Jörg (2001). Das grosse TEE Buch (in German). Bonn/Königswinter: Heel Verlag. ISBN 3-89365-948-X.
- Mertens, Maurice; Malaspina, Jean-Pierre (2007). La Légende des Trans Europ Express (in French). Vannes: LR Presse. ISBN 978-29-036514-5-9.
