= Trans Europ Express =

European first-class railway service

Trans Europe Express

Overview
- Service type: International network of express trains
- Status: Defunct
- Locale: Western Europe
- First service: 2 June 1957
- Last service: 28 May 1995
- Successor: Various, including EuroCity, InterCity, TGV, Thalys and other systems.
- Former operator: The national railways of several European countries

On-board services
- Classes: 1957–1991: First class only 1993–1995 (Paris–Brussels only): First and second class

Technical
- Electrification: Various different voltages, depending on country

The Trans Europ Express, or Trans-Europe Express (TEE), was an international first-class railway service in western and central Europe that was founded in 1957 and ceased in 1995. At the height of its operations, in 1974, the TEE network comprised 45 trains, connecting 130 different cities, from Spain in the west to Austria in the east, and from Denmark to Southern Italy.

== Origin ==
The first services commenced on 2 June 1957 following an idea of F.Q. den Hollander, then president-director of the Dutch national railway company (NS). TEE was a network jointly operated by the railways of West Germany (DB), France (SNCF), Switzerland (SBB-CFF-FFS), Italy (FS) and the Netherlands. Although some trains passed through Belgium from the beginning, the Belgian national railway company (NMBS/SNCB) joined the program only in 1964. Luxembourg (CFL) also joined at a later date.

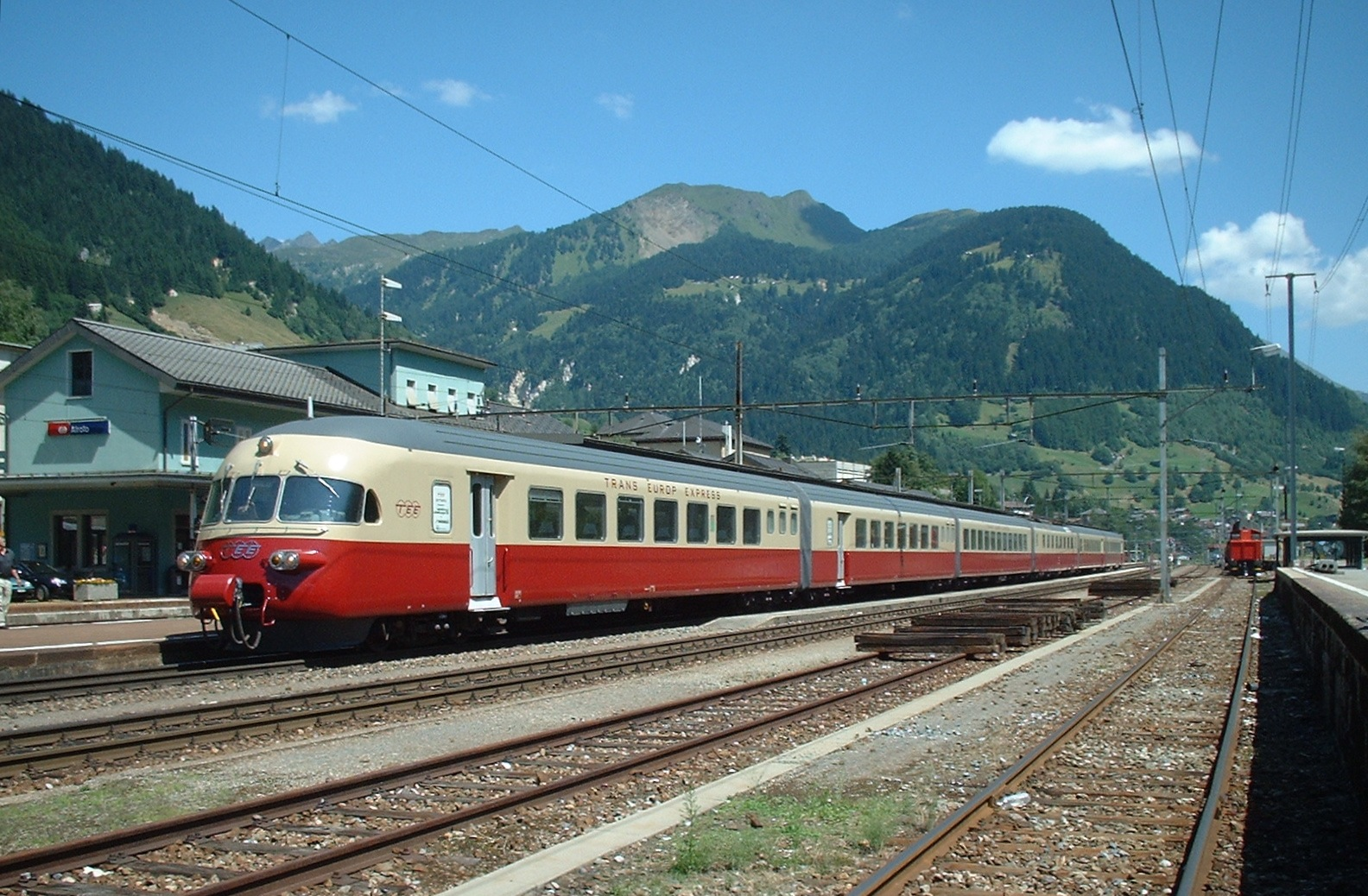
Swiss TEE trainset capable of operating at four different voltages

The idea was for a network of fast and comfortable transnational trains that would be attractive to businessmen and other regular travellers. All trains were first-class-only and required payment of a special supplement over the normal first-class ticket price, the amount of which depended on the distance covered. Where possible, TEE trains' schedules were timed to allow a business traveller to make a round trip (return journey) within a single day and also have time for business activity at the destination. Each train was named, and all were expresses, stopping only at major cities. Some of the named trains had already existed for some years before creation of the TEE network and were simply newly designated as Trans-Europe Expresses in 1957 or later. For example, the Settebello had been in operation since 1953 and the Rheingold since 1951 (as a revival of a pre-World War II train). The network was launched in 1957 with trains serving 13 different routes.

== Rolling stock ==
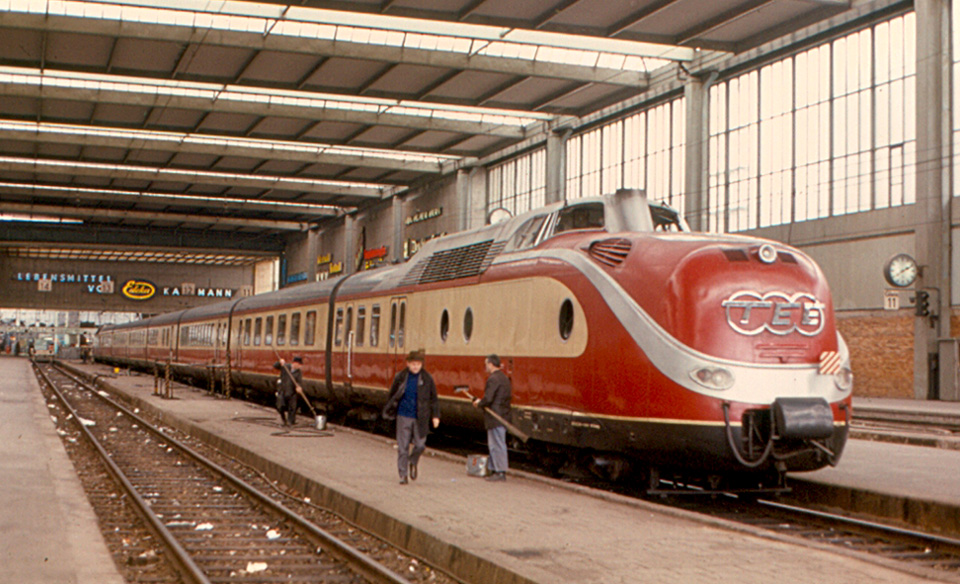
German DB Class VT 11.5 diesel trainset that was used in TEE service until 1972 at München Hauptbahnhof in 1970

Initially, the system was a completely diesel network. Because of the many different kinds of electrical specifications (voltages and current types – alternating current and direct current) used in the different countries it was thought at that time that use of diesel-hauled trains or diesel multiple-unit trainsets would greatly speed up border crossing. Moreover, at that time many border crossing sections were not yet electrified. The German DB built the streamlined DB Class VT 11.5, while the Swiss Federal Railways (SBB) and the Dutch NS developed the RAm / DE, both diesel trains.

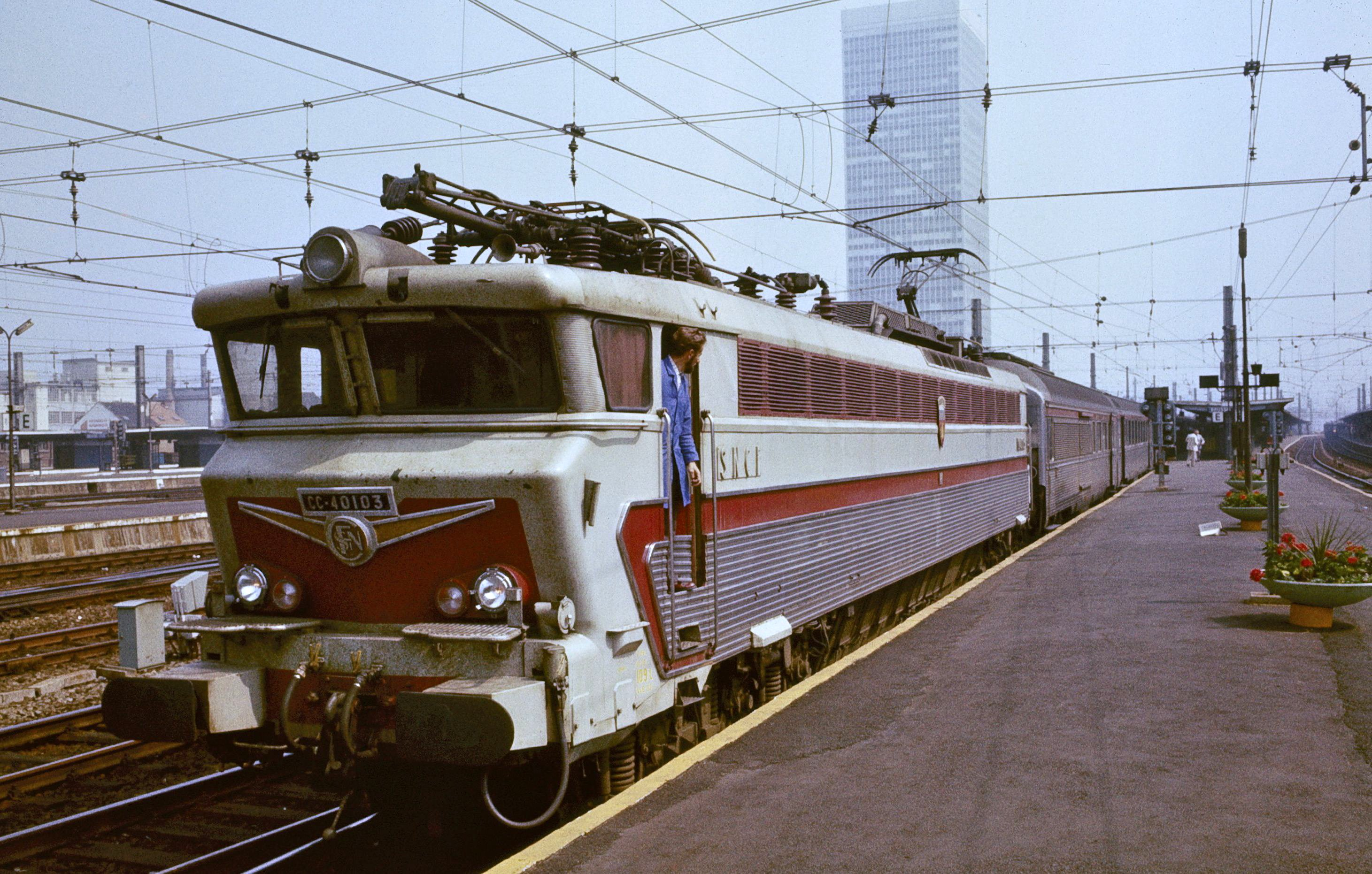
An SNCF CC 40100 with the Brussels–Paris L'Oiseau Bleu TEE in 1979. By the 1970s most TEEs were locomotive-hauled, rather than self-propelled trainsets.

However, the creation of the international TEE network provided impetus for the development of special electric trainsets and electric locomotives, capable of operating at two or more different voltages. The DB used the 160 km/h (99 mph) E 10.12 and the 200 km/h (120 mph) DB Class 103, among other types. The SBB developed its RAe TEE II electric trainset, which was designed for four different railway electrification systems, and this type entered service in 1961. Belgian National Railways introduced its Type 150 locomotives (now called Class 15) in 1962, capable of handling three different voltages, followed by the four-voltage Type 160 (Class 16) in 1966 and Class 18 in 1973. Meanwhile, France's SNCF also developed and introduced ten quadruple-voltage locomotives, its Class CC 40100, between 1964 and 1970.

By 1975, all but two (L'Arbalète and Bavaria) of the 43 TEE trains were electrically powered, and most were locomotive-hauled.

== Modification of service ==
Originally the idea was to promote only international routes as TEE routes. This idea was abandoned in 1965 with the introduction of the French Le Mistral and the German Blauer Enzian. Later, TEE trains serving single countries were also introduced on other routes in France and Germany as well as in Italy, but most TEE routes continued to be international.

== Growth ==
The TEE network at its maximum extent (1974)

The network grew in the course of the years, adding three more countries: Spain (Renfe), Denmark (DSB) and Austria (ÖBB). The system reached furthest in 1974. However, of these three only Renfe became a TEE member; the other two countries had TEEs running through them but the rail administrations were never members. In the late 1970s, the TEE network comprised 39 different named trains, serving 31 routes. A few routes had more than one TEE train concurrently; for example, the Paris–Brussels route had four TEEs, running at different times of the day.

== Contraction and end ==
From the late 1970s onward, gradually more and more Trans-Europe Express trains were replaced by other trains giving a similar kind of service but also carrying 2nd class. Business travellers used air travel more and more. In 1971 DB completely restructured the network with the coming of the new similar but national InterCity services, which added second class in 1979, resulting in successively fewer TEE services and more InterCity services in the course of time. The introduction of the TGV service in France in 1981, and its subsequent expansion, along with expansion of high-speed rail lines in other European countries led to still more TEEs' being replaced by domestic high-speed trains.

After 1984 most services were abandoned, leaving only some national services in (mostly) Italy and France and very few international services. Most trains were replaced by a new international intercity network with the name EuroCity which provides both 1st and 2nd class service. The EuroCity network began operating on 31 May 1987, and with effect from that date the last remaining international Trans-Europe Express trains were redesignated or withdrawn, except the Gottardo (reclassified as EuroCity in September 1988), but in name, the TEE designation continued to be used for a few domestic trains operating entirely within France until 1 June 1991.

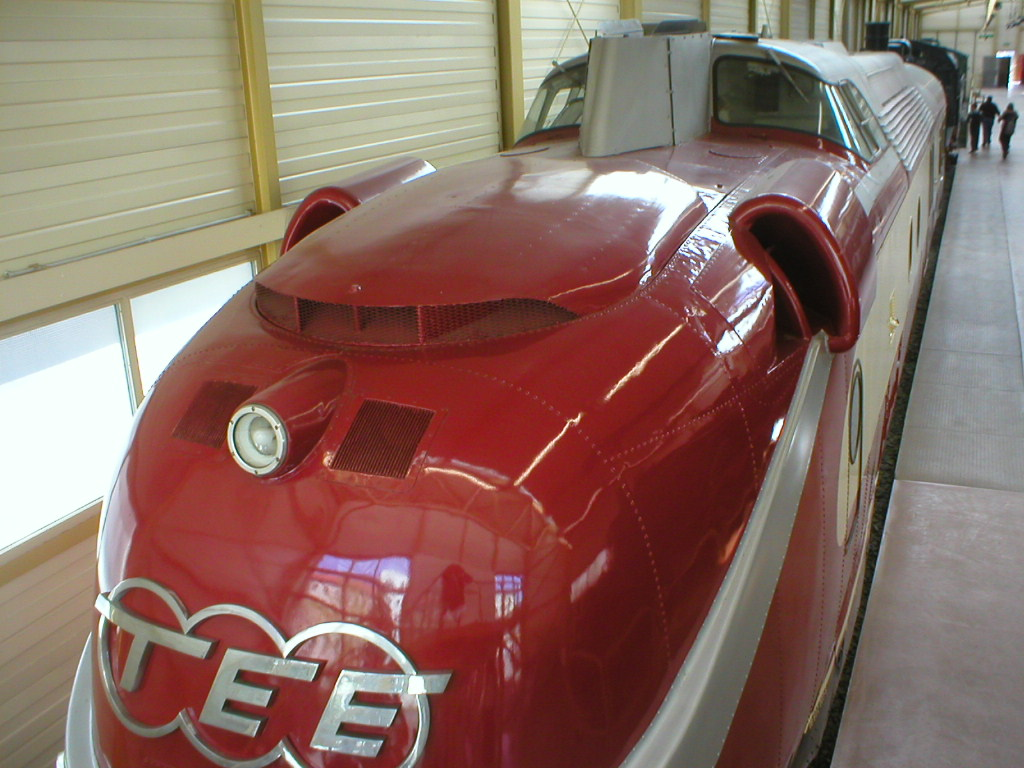
TEE in the DB Museum

In September 1993 certain former TEE trains operating non-stop journeys between Brussels and Paris (or vice versa), which had been converted to EuroCity and offered both first- and second-class coaches, were rebranded as Trans-Europe Expresses, but remaining two-class trains. This was during a transition of Paris–Brussels express services to a new TGV alignment, and initially included the trains Brabant, Île de France, Rubens and Watteau, all four serving the route in both directions. However, by 1995 the only TEE-branded trains remaining were the northbound Île de France (train 85) and southbound Watteau (train 88), the opposing-direction trains carrying the same names having already been converted to TGV stock (and designation), and these last two TEEs were replaced by TGV trains with effect from 29 May 1995, once again ending the formal use of the Trans-Europ Express name. These few Paris–Brussels (or vice versa) expresses, operated 1993–1995, were the only TEE-designated trains ever to carry second-class carriages (they were in effect EuroCity services). A few trains continued to utilise TEE branded coaches until 1 June 1996, but the trains themselves were no longer classified as TEEs.

== Proposed new TEE network (2020s) ==
In September 2020, Germany made proposals for a new Trans Europe Express TEE 2.0 network. Proposed routes in the short term include:

- Amsterdam – Paris – Barcelona
- Brussels – Berlin – Warsaw
- Amsterdam – Frankfurt – Zürich – Rome
- Barcelona – Frankfurt – Berlin

Proposed daytime high-speed TEE 2.0 routes following the completion of new lines include:

- Stockholm – Hamburg – Paris
- Stockholm – Berlin – Munich
- Rome – Verona – Munich – Berlin
- Paris – Munich – Budapest

There are also proposals for night train networks proposed in the short-term which are remarkably similar to Deutsche Bahn's former City Night Line network, which DB discontinued in 2016. Most of the routes in the short-term network are currently operated by Austrian Federal Railways (ÖBB) as part of its Nightjet network although a proposed Frankfurt – Lyon – Barcelona service would offer a direct rail services that has not been possible for many decades. Overnight routes proposed in the longer term include two routes from Stockholm, one serving both Amsterdam and Paris, the other running via Prague to Vienna and Budapest.

In May 2021, transport ministers from multiple European Union (EU) member states have signed a letter of intent to create the Trans-Europe Express (TEE) 2.0 network first announced in September 2020 during the German presidency of the EU. The Agreement includes the development of a regular interval timetable. Member states will also identify operators interested in taking part.

The signing took place during a conference organised by German federal transport minister, Mr Andreas Scheuer, on 17 May, and includes a number of pledges which expand the initial TEE 2.0 concept.

The agreement foresees the development of a regular interval timetable on a pan-European basis to provide an alternative to short-haul flights and car journeys. The original German proposal for the TEE 2.0 concept assumes:

- TEE 2.0 services connect at least three EU member states or two member states over at least 600 km (370 mi)
- TEE 2.0 trains operate at a minimum of 160 km/h (99 mph) on a substantial part of the route or an average speed of more than 100 km/h (62 mph) on the entire route, and
- TEE 2.0 offers increased comfort, with free Wi-Fi and restaurant cars.

While the letter of intent is not legally binding, the signatories agree to identify which railway operators from their respective countries want to be involved in delivering future TEE 2.0 services. They also pledged to act as facilitators to ensure that rail operators and infrastructure managers in neighbouring countries make meaningful progress in developing TEE 2.0 plans.

In addition, the signatories agreed to request that the European Commission (EC) propose the launch of an EU financial assistance programme to invest in rolling stock that can operate across borders. They also agreed to lobby for further technical and operational improvements to facilitate the operation of cross-border rail services.

Under the new agreement, and to support the prospective operators, the EU member states promise to act as moderators in the development of timetables. They also vow to support the creation of an interoperable digital booking platform which supports booking international journeys offered by TEE 2.0 operators, which should be as straightforward as domestic journeys. How such a system would deal with the domestic parts of journeys to or from the high-speed rail network, and how third-party rail ticket sales websites might be included, is unclear.

A proposed network published after the conference has been expanded compared with the earlier iteration, which was centred on central Europe. It now includes routes that can be achieved relatively simply such as Barcelona – Nice – Venice as well as others such as Warsaw – Riga – Tallinn that rely on major new infrastructure projects now underway, in this case Rail Baltica, which is due to open in 2030.

Some existing high frequency international links have also been included at the request of EU member states, including Amsterdam – London route serving non-EU member, Britain.

Separately, as part of the conference, Germany, the Czech Republic and Austria signed a Memorandum of Understanding for the future expansion of the Berlin – Dresden – Prague – Vienna Via Vindobona international connection. The declaration outlines the planned high-speed line and other infrastructure plans for the route.

== Cultural references ==
The railway service was the subject of a 1977 album by German electronic music group Kraftwerk, the music of which has been sampled multiple times and has thus ingrained the railway reference in a variety of musical genres. One of the locations from the 1992 video game Earnest Evans is based on a train using the Trans Europ Express.

Trans-Europ Express also provides the title of a 1966 film by French director Alain Robbe-Grillet, starring Jean-Louis Trintignant.

== List of the TEE trains ==
Train number	Name		Service start	Service end
TEE 92/93	Adriatico	Milano C – Bari	3 June 1973	30 May 1987
TEE 8/9	Albert Schweitzer	Dortmund – Strasbourg	2 June 1980	27 May 1983
TEE 78/79	Ambrosiano	Milano – Roma	26 May 1974	30 May 1987
TEE 1/2	Aquitaine	Paris Austerlitz – Bordeaux	23 May 1971	30 May 1984
TEE 7/8 (later 64/65)	Arbalète	Paris Est – Basel SBB – Zürich HB	2 June 1957	26 May 1979
TEE 88/89	Aurora	Roma – Reggio di Calabria	26 May 1974	31 May 1975
TEE 14/15	Bacchus	München – Dortmund	28 May 1979	30 May 1980
TEE 66/67	Bavaria	Zürich HB – München	28 September 1969	21 May 1977
TEE 84/85	Brabant	Paris Nord – Bruxelles Midi/Brussel Zuid – (Amsterdam CS)	26 May 1963	2 June 1984
TEE 90/91	Blauer Enzian	Hamburg-Altona – München – (Klagenfurt) (Note: Route section between München and Klagenfurt operated 1969–1979, in summer and winter timetable periods only, last operating on 1 April 1979.)	30 May 1965	26 May 1979
TEE 74/75	Le Capitole (du matin)	Paris-Austerlitz – Toulouse-Matabiau (morning train)	27 September 1970	23 May 1982
TEE 76/77	Le Capitole (du soir)	Paris-Austerlitz – Toulouse-Matabiau (evening train)	27 May 1970	29 September 1984
TEE 70-71/72-73	Catalan Talgo	Geneva-Cornavin – Barcelona	1 June 1969	22 May 1982
TEE 13/14 (later 23/22)	Cisalpin	Paris-Lyon – Milano Centrale – (Venezia) (Note: Route section between Milano and Venezia operated in summer only, 1974 through 1979.)	1 July 1961	21 January 1984
TEE 68/69	Colosseum	Roma – Milano C	3 June 1984	30 May 1987
TEE 36/37	Cycnus	Milano – Ventimiglia	30 September 1973	27 May 1978
TEE 42/43	Diamant (I)	Dortmund – Antwerpen	30 May 1965	29 May 1976
TEE 80/81	Diamant (II)	München – Hamburg-Altona	27 May 1979	27 May 1981
TEE 90/93	Edelweiss	Amsterdam – Zürich HB	2 June 1957	26 May 1979
TEE 26/27	Erasmus	München – Nürnberg – Den Haag	3 June 1973	31 May 1980
TEE 4/5	Étendard	Paris Austerlitz – Bordeaux (Note: Extended to Irun and from Hendaye, summer 1973 through summer 1975.)	26 August 1971	30 May 1984
TEE 82/85	Étoile du Nord	Paris Nord – Amsterdam CS	2 June 1957	26 June 1984
TEE 34/35	Faidherbe	Paris Nord – Lille – Tourcoing	2 October 1978	1 June 1991
TEE 16/17	Friedrich Schiller	Dortmund – Stuttgart	27 May 1979	19 May 1982
TEE 14/15 (later 18/19)	Gambrinus	Hamburg-Altona – Köln (Cologne) – München	29 May 1978	27 May 1983
TEE 36/37	Gayant	Paris Nord – Lille – Tourcoing	2 October 1978	30 May 1986
TEE 50/51	Goethe (I)	Frankfurt/Main – Paris Est	31 May 1970	31 May 1975
TEE 24/25	Goethe (II)	Frankfurt/Main – Dortmund	27 May 1979	27 May 1983
TEE 58/59	Gottardo	Zürich HB – Milano C	1 July 1961	24 September 1988
TEE 28/29	Heinrich Heine	Frankfurt/Main – Dortmund	27 May 1979	27 May 1983
TEE 78/79	Helvetia	Zürich HB – Frankfurt/Main – Hamburg-Altona	2 June 1957	26 May 1979
TEE 88/81	L'Ile de France (I)	Paris Nord – Amsterdam CS (only Paris–Brussels after 2 June 1984)	2 June 1957	30 May 1987
TEE 85/80	L'Ile de France (II)	Paris Nord – Bruxelles Midi/Brussel Zuid	September 1993	28 May 1995
TEE 91/92	Iris	Zürich – Bruxelles Midi/Brussel Zuid	26 May 1974	30 May 1981
TEE 30/31	Jules Verne	Paris Montparnasse – Nantes	28 September 1980	22 September 1989
TEE 60/61	Kléber	Paris Est – Strasbourg	23 May 1971	23 September 1988
TEE 24/25	Lemano	Milano C – Geneva-Cornavin	1 June 1958	22 May 1982
TEE 45-46/47-48	Ligure	Milano C – Avignon (Note: Original western terminus was at Marseille (and train number 151/156 or 27/28); extended to Avignon in 1969.)	12 September 1957	22 May 1982
TEE 12/13	Le Lyonnais	Paris-Lyon – Lyon Perrache	9 February 1969	26 September 1976
TEE 84/85	Mediolanum	München – Milano C	15 October 1957	2 June 1984
TEE 86/79	Memling	Paris Nord – Bruxelles Midi/Brussel Zuid	29 September 1974	1 June 1984
TEE 34/35	Merkur	Stuttgart – Köln – København	26 May 1974	27 May 1978
TEE 10/11	Le Mistral	Paris-Lyon – Marseille St. C – Nice-Ville	30 May 1965	26 September 1981
TEE 23/24	Mont Cenis	Lyon-Perrache – Milano C	2 June 1957	30 September 1972
TEE 40/41	Molière (ex-Paris–Ruhr)	Paris Nord – Köln	2 June 1957	25 May 1979
TEE 80/89	L'Oiseau Bleu	Paris Nord – Bruxelles Midi/Brussel Zuid	2 June 1957	2 June 1984
TEE 32/33	Parsifal	Paris Nord – Dortmund – Hamburg-Altona	29 September 1957	26 May 1979
TEE 26/27	Prinz Eugen (I)	Bremen – Passau – Wien Westbf.	25 September 1971	29 May 1976
TEE 26/27	Prinz Eugen (II)	Hannover – Köln – Frankfurt/Main – Wien Westbf.	30 May 1976	27 May 1978
TEE 10/11	Rembrandt	München – Stuttgart – Amsterdam CS	28 May 1967	28 May 1983
TEE 6/7	Rheingold	Amsterdam CS – Geneva-Cornavin (train) (Note: Bern–Geneva section discontinued 6 April 1980, reinstated autumn 1980 as winter-only service; Basel–Geneva section discontinued 1982. However, during certain times of year both before 1982 and continuing after, the train carried through coaches to Chur and (until 1985) Milano, which were attached to ordinary express trains south of Basel.)	30 May 1965	30 May 1987
TEE 16/17	Rheingold	Amsterdam – Frankfurt – Nördlingen – München (coaches) (Note: Rheingold's München variant operated only in summer until 1985, then year-round until withdrawn; extended to/from Salzburg during the summer timetable periods in 1985 and 1986.)	23 May 1982	30 May 1987
TEE 21/22	Rheinpfeil	Dortmund – Frankfurt/Main – München	30 May 1965	25 September 1971
TEE 74/75	Roland (I)	Bremen – Basel SBB – Milano C	1 June 1969	26 May 1979
TEE 90/91	Roland (II)	Bremen – Frankfurt/Main – Stuttgart	28 May 1979	29 May 1980
TEE 78/79	Rubens	Paris Nord – Bruxelles Midi/Brussel Zuid	29 September 1974	27 May 1987
TEE 16/17	Le Rhodanien	Paris-Lyon – Marseille St. C	23 May 1971	29 September 1978
TEE 28/29 (later 20/21)	Saphir	Frankfurt/Main – Bruxelles Midi/Brussel Zuid	2 June 1957	26 May 1979
TEE 68/69	Settebello	Roma – Milano C	26 May 1974	2 June 1984
TEE 62/63	Stanislas	Paris Est – Strasbourg	24 May 1971	25 September 1982
TEE 83-86/87-88	Ticino	Zürich HB – Milano C	1 July 1961	25 May 1974
TEE 22/23	Van Beethoven (ex-Rhein–Main)	Frankfurt/Main – Amsterdam CS	2 June 1957	26 May 1979
TEE 94/95	Vesuvio	Milano C – Roma – Napoli	30 September 1973	30 May 1987
TEE 38/39	Watteau (I)	Paris Nord – Lille – Tourcoing	2 October 1978	1 June 1991
TEE 89/88	Watteau (II)	Paris Nord – Bruxelles Midi/Brussel Zuid	September 1993	28 May 1995

== See also ==
- Lufthansa Airport Express – a non-TEE service whose trains were designated by "TEE" numbers by their operator, Deutsche Bundesbahn
- Train categories in Europe
- Ontario Northland Railway, operator 4 RAm/DE train sets from 1977 to 1980s; most scrapped with 1 set in the Netherlands and 2 cars stored in North Bay, Ontario
