= Rhein–Main (train) =

Passenger train service between Germany and the Netherlands

Overview
- Service type: Fern D-Zug (D) (1953–1957); Trans Europ Express (TEE) (1957–1973)
- Status: Discontinued
- Locale: Netherlands; Germany
- First service: 28 May 1953
- Last service: 27 May 1972
- Successor: TEE Van Beethoven
- Former operator: Deutsche Bundesbahn

Route
- Termini: Frankfurt am Main; Dortmund / Amsterdam
- Distance travelled: 482 km
- Service frequency: Daily

Technical
- Track gauge: 1,435 mm (4 ft 8 1/2 in)
- Electrification: 1500 V DC (Netherlands); 15 kV 16,7 Hz (Germany)
Route map
- TEE Rhein–Main (red) and TEE Saphir (blue) in the TEE network of 1957

The Rhein–Main was an express train that linked Frankfurt am Main with Dortmund in Germany and later with Amsterdam in the Netherlands. The train was named after the two rivers, the Rhine and the Main, that join west of Frankfurt. For most of its life, it was a Trans Europ Express (TEE).

== F-Zug ==
The Rhein–Main was launched in May 1953 as train number F 31 northbound and F 32 southbound. The service was operated by Deutsche Bundesbahn (German Federal Railways) with Class VT 08 diesel multiple units.

== Trans Europ Express ==
On 2 June 1957, the Rhein–Main was one of the initial TEE services. The rolling stock was given TEE signage on front but the use of VT 08 continued for a few months, because the German TEE trainsets planned for it were not available for the Rhein–Main until 1 December 1957. With the start of the TEE network the northern terminus was changed from Dortmund to Amsterdam, and the Cologne – Dortmund portion of the Rhein–Main became part of the TEE Saphir. During the summer of 1958 and the winter of 1958–59 the Rhein–Main and Saphir ran coupled between Frankfurt and Cologne after the Saphir's eastern terminus was changed from Dortmund to Frankfurt. After 31 May 1959, the Saphir, using the east bank of the Rhine, and the Rhein–Main using the west bank of the Rhine calling at the West-German capital Bonn, ran as separate trains again.

On 28 May 1967, the Oberhausen–Arnhem railway electrification works were completed and Rhein–Main's rolling stock was replaced by electric-locomotive-hauled trains. Because of poor loading figures on the evening service between Bonn and Frankfurt the southbound service was shortened to Bonn on 26 September 1971. The northbound route continued to start in Frankfurt. On 28 May 1972, the service was renamed TEE Van Beethoven.

== Works cited ==
- Hajt, Jörg (2001). Das grosse TEE Buch (in German). Bonn/Königswinter: Heel Verlag. ISBN 3-89365-948-X.
- Mertens, Maurice; Malaspina, Jean-Pierre (2007). La Légende des Trans Europ Express (in French). Vannes: LR Presse. ISBN 978-29-036514-5-9.
- Goette, Peter (2008). TEE-Züge in Deutschland (in German). Freiburg: EK-Verlag. ISBN 978-3-88255-698-8.
