= Lyonesse (disambiguation) =

Lyonesse is a country in Arthurian legend.

Lyonesse or Lyoness may also refer to:

- Lyonesse, an Arthurian character; see Lynette and Lyonesse
- The Lyonesse Trilogy, a high fantasy trilogy by Jack Vance
  - Lyonesse (novel), the first book of the trilogy
- Lyonesse, a fictional planet in the Foundation (book series) by Isaac Asimov
- Lyonesse, a fictional underground kingdom of Deviants in Marvel Comics
- SS Lyonesse, a ship built in 1889 for the ferry service between Penzance and the Isles of Scilly

== See also ==
- Lyoness, a shopping community
- Lyonnaise (disambiguation)
