= Vesuvio (train) =

Decommissioned Italian express train

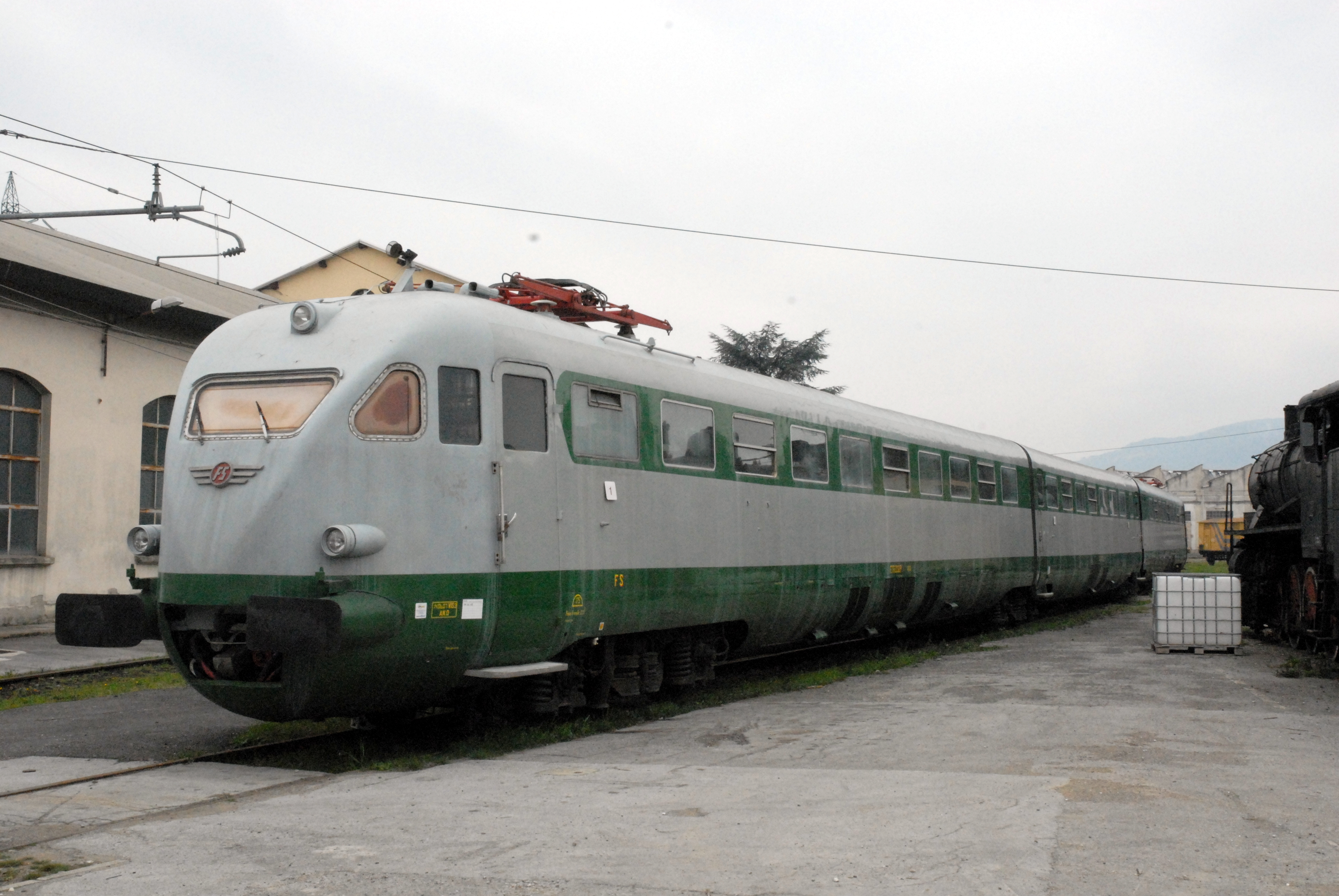
- FS Class ETR 200

Overview
- Service type: Rapido (1937 – 1940); Rapido (1946–1973); Trans Europ Express (TEE) (1973–1987); InterCity(IC) (1987–2005)
- Locale: Italy
- First service: 1937
- Last service: 11 December 2005
- Former operator(s): Ferrovie dello Stato

Route
- Distance travelled: 839 km

Technical
- Track gauge: 1,435 mm (4 ft 8 1/2 in)
- Electrification: 3000 V Direct Current (Italy)

The Vesuvio was an express train in Italy, linking Milan and Naples. The train was named after Mount Vesuvius the volcano near Naples.

== History ==
The history of this train dates back as far as the 1930s, when Italy completed its first two high-speed lines, the Direttissime, one between Bologna and Florence and the other between Rome and Naples. High speed at that time meant 175 km/h and a new electric multiple unit, the Elettro Treno Rapido 200 (ETR 200), was developed with help of Turin University between 1934 and 1936. The ETR 200 was built by Breda in 1936 and entered service between Bologna and Naples in 1937, using the new lines and calling at Florence and Rome.

== Rapido ==
After World War II the service was resumed and named Freccia del Vesuvio (Vesuvian Arrow) in the Fifties. The ETR 200 stock was modified to ETR 220/230/240 in the early 1960s, thus bringing the consist to four coaches. The 1960 Olympics brought the ETR 250 and the Vesuvio was operated with ETR 220 and ETR 250 EMUs until the replacement by TEE Vesuvio.

== Trans Europ Express ==
In 1969, the Ferrovie dello Stato decided to replace its Trans Europ Express (TEE) diesel multiple units with locomotive-hauled trains, after the German and French examples. Because domestic TEEs had been allowed since 1965, the order for the Gran Conforto coaches was expanded, not only to replace the existing international TEEs but also to convert the high-end domestic services to TEE. The Freccia del Vesuvio was upgraded to TEE Vesuvio as soon as the new rolling stock was available, on 30 September 1973. The TEE Vesuvio was operated with E444 locomotives hauling Gran Conforto coaches. Notably, the Vesuvio conveyed two dining cars from 26 May 1974 until 30 September 1979.

== Intercity ==
In 1987, the Vesuvio was converted into a two-class InterCity service because it was not an international service and therefore couldn't qualify as EuroCity. The service continued as daily service until its replacement by the EuroStar Italia operated with ETR 500 electric multiple units using the 21st century high-speed lines.

== Works cited ==
- Hajt, Jörg (2001). Das grosse TEE Buch (in German). Bonn/Königswinter: Heel Verlag. ISBN 3-89365-948-X.
- Mertens, Maurice; Malaspina, Jean-Pierre (2007). La Légende des Trans Europ Express (in French). Vannes: LR Presse. ISBN 978-29-036514-5-9.
- Willemse, G.L.S. (1964). De snelste treinen van Europa (in Dutch). Alkmaar: Uitgeverij de Alk.
