= Merkur (train) =

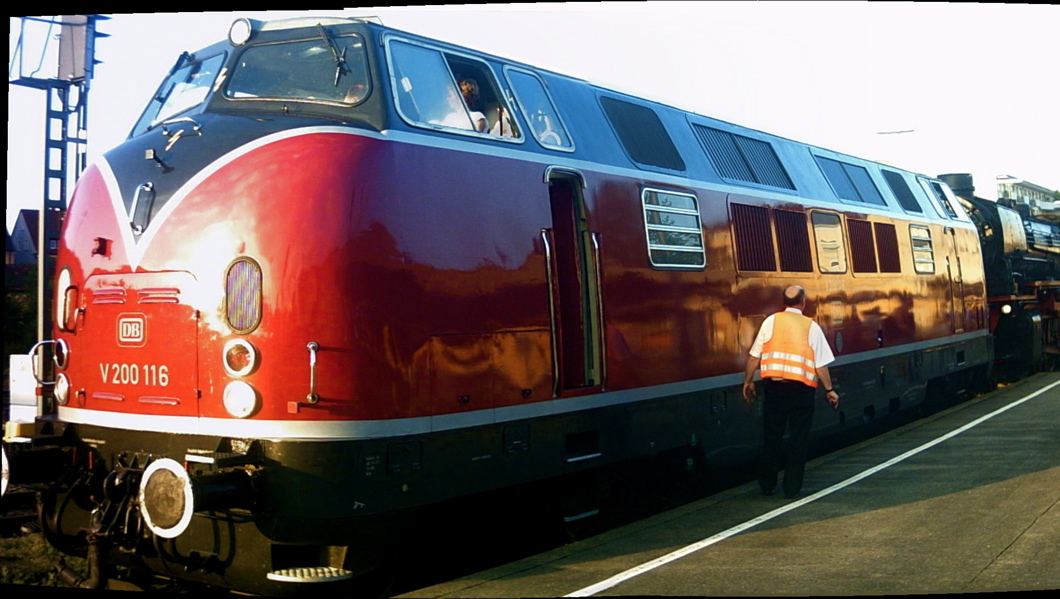
- Class V200

Overview
- Service type: F-Zug (1953-1971); Intercity (1971-1974); Trans Europ Express (TEE) (1974–1978); Intercity (1978–1987); EuroCity (1987-1991)
- Status: Discontinued
- Locale: Germany; Denmark
- First service: 1 June 1953
- Last service: 1 June 1991
- Successor: EC Karen Blixen
- Former operator(s): Deutsche Bundesbahn; Danske Statsbaner

Route
- Termini: Copenhagen; Stuttgart
- Distance travelled: 1,205 km (749 mi)
- Service frequency: Daily

Technical
- Track gauge: 1,435 mm (4 ft 8 1/2 in)

The Merkur was an international express train linking Copenhagen, the Danish capital, with Germany. The train was named after the Roman God Mercury, the God of traders and travellers.

== F-Zug ==
In 1953 the Merkur was introduced by Deutsche Bundesbahn as part of their long-distance network (Fern Zug). The Merkur (F 3/4) linked Hamburg with Frankfurt am Main via Cologne and through the Rhinevalley on the eastbank railway. In 1954 the route south of Frankfurt was extended to Stuttgart and the Merkur became known for its long non-stop stages with steam locomotives.

In 1971 the F-Zug network was converted to a firstclass only Intercity network and the Merkur was assigned the trainnumbers IC 114/115. Another train of the F-Zug network, the Schwabenpfeil, (F 23/24) ran between Stuttgart and Dortmund through the Rhine valley as well, but on the west bank of the Rhine, calling in the West-German capital Bonn. With the conversion to the Intercity network the Schwabenpfeil was extended further north to Hamburg as IC 110/119.

== Trans Europ Express ==
The Merkur was upgraded to TEE on 26 May 1974 as the service was extended north of Hamburg to Copenhagen over the Vogelfluglinie. It was the only TEE service in Denmark and the only TEE using a train ferry during its journey. In order to connect the two capitals Bonn and Copenhagen the Schwabenpfeil was withdrawn and the Merkur used its route and slot south of Hamburg. Between Stuttgart and Hamburg the train was hauled by class 103 electric locomotives, north of Hamburg the German diesel class 221 and the Danish diesel classes MY and MZ were used. The ferry from Rødby Færge to Puttgarden took about 55 minutes, the loading and unloading about 5 minutes on each side. The longer stop at Rødby Færge was caused by customs inspection and not meant to let passengers leave or board the train. In order to cope with the language barrier the train had multilingual (Danish/German/English) stewardesses on board.

=== Technical problems ===
Differences between Danish and German train operation caused some technical problems with heating and airconditioning. The electric power needed for the airconditioning couldn't be provided by the Danish locomotives so the batteries of the coaches had to be loaded during the crossing of the Fehmarn between Puttgarden and Rødby Færge. On the other hand, the steam heating wasn't operational in Germany any more, so the steamheating in the German coaches was in bad shape, causing heating problems on the Danish side.

=== Catering ===
Neither the Deutsche Bundesbahn nor the German Sleeper and Dining Car Company (DSG) regarded a full dining car between Hamburg and Copenhagen as profitable. The TEE criteria however demanded on board catering so a minibar was introduced. As the alcohol duties in Germany and Denmark differed from each other it wasn't allowed to sell Danish alcohol in Germany and vice versa. This alcohol problem was solved by parking the national minibar in the customs house at the border. The Danish minibar was filled in Copenhagen and travelled to Rødby Færge where it was sealed and stored in the customs house and picked up by the return service to Copenhagen. The same occurred with the German minibar filled in Hamburg and stored in the customs house at Puttgarden. As a result, the only catering on board the ferry was coffee.

== Intercity ==
On 28 May 1978 the train was downgraded to an intercity service with 2nd-class coaches as well.

== EuroCity ==
In 1987 the Merkur became part of the new EuroCity network. In order to tackle the low frequency of the TEE network, two more trains, EC Hansa and EC Skandinavien, were introduced at the Vogelfluglinie, so three high quality services daily in each direction between Hamburg and Copenhagen were available for travellers. In 1991 it was decided to name the EuroCities after famous Danes and Germans, so the Merkur was replaced by the EC Karen Blixen.

== Works cited ==
- Hajt, Jörg (2001). Das grosse TEE Buch (in German). Bonn/Königswinter: Heel Verlag. ISBN 3-89365-948-X.
- Mertens, Maurice; Malaspina, Jean-Pierre (2007). La Légende des Trans Europ Express (in French). Vannes: LR Presse. ISBN 978-29-036514-5-9.
- Goette, Peter (2008). TEE-Züge in Deutschland (in German). Freiburg: EK-Verlag. ISBN 978-3-88255-698-8.
- Raabe, Rainer (2008). TEE Merkur (in German). Zürich: TEE Classics.
