= Rubens (train) =

Overview
- Service type: Trans Europ Express (TEE) (1974–1987); EuroCity (EC) (1987–1993); Trans Europ Express (TEE) (1993–1995)
- Status: Replaced by TGV
- Locale: France; Belgium
- First service: 29 September 1974
- Last service: 23 January 1995
- Former operator(s): NMBS / SNCF

Route
- Termini: Gare du Nord; Bruxelles-Midi / Brussel-Zuid
- Stops: none
- Distance travelled: 310 km
- Service frequency: Daily

Technical
- Track gauge: 1,435 mm (4 ft 8 1/2 in)
- Electrification: 25 kV AC (France); 3000 V DC (Belgium)

The Rubens was an express train that linked Gare du Nord in Paris, France, with Bruxelles-Midi / Brussel-Zuid in Brussels, Belgium. The train was named after Flemish painter Peter Paul Rubens.

== History ==
=== Trans Europ Express ===
The Rubens was introduced together with the TEE Memling in the TEE-network to cope with the raising number of passengers between Paris and Brussels. Both services were the first in the morning, the Rubens departed from Brussels at 6:42 in the morning, while the Memling departed from the Gare du Nord in Paris at 6:45. The return services were scheduled as the fifth of the six daily TEEs in both directions, departing around 6:45 p.m.

=== EuroCity ===
In 1987 the Rubens was, like the other Paris-Brussels TEE services, integrated into the new EuroCity network. On 23 May 1993 the EuroCity services between Paris and Brussels were classified as TEE again. After the opening of the LGV-Nord on 23 January 1995 the Rubens was withdrawn.

== Works cited ==
- Hajt, Jörg (2001). Das grosse TEE Buch (in German). Bonn/Königswinter: Heel Verlag. ISBN 3-89365-948-X.
- Mertens, Maurice; Malaspina, Jean-Pierre (2007). La Légende des Trans Europ Express (in French). Vannes: LR Presse. ISBN 978-29-036514-5-9.
