= Gayant (train) =

French express train (1978–86)

Overview
- Service type: Trans Europ Express (TEE) (1978–1986)
- Locale: France
- First service: 8 October 1978
- Last service: 30 May 1986
- Former operator(s): SNCF

Route
- Termini: Gare du Nord, Paris; Tourcoing
- Service frequency: Weekdays

Technical
- Track gauge: 1,435 mm (4 ft 8 1/2 in)
- Electrification: 25000 V AC (France)

The Gayant was an express train that linked Gare du Nord in Paris, France, with Tourcoing in the department of Nord, also in France. The train was named after Gayant, the processional giant of Douai, France.

One year before the creation of the TEE-network the French railway SNCF introduced three Trains d'affaires to link Paris with the industrial area of Nord, near the Belgian border. These trains were scheduled as a morning, midday and evening service in both directions. Initially the services were operated with RGP 600 DMUs. In 1959 these were replaced by locomotive hauled trains consisting of Corail coaches. Although domestic TEE-services were allowed from 1965, the Trains d'affaires were not upgraded to TEEs until 1978. Together with the upgrading to TEE the trains were named. The midday service pair was named Gayant.

== Works cited ==
- Hajt, Jörg (2001). Das grosse TEE Buch (in German). Bonn/Königswinter: Heel Verlag. ISBN 3-89365-948-X.
- Mertens, Maurice; Malaspina, Jean-Pierre (2007). La Légende des Trans Europ Express (in French). Vannes: LR Presse. ISBN 978-29-036514-5-9.
