= Memling (train) =

European passenger train (1974–1997)

Overview
- Service type: Trans Europ Express (TEE) (1974–1984); EuroCity (EC) (1987–1997)
- Locale: France; Belgium
- First service: 29 September 1974
- Last service: 13 December 1997
- Successor: Thalys
- Former operators: NMBS / SNCF

Route
- Termini: Gare du Nord / Ostend; Brussel Zuid / Cologne
- Stops: none
- Distance travelled: 310 km
- Service frequency: Daily

Technical
- Track gauge: 1,435 mm (4 ft 8 1/2 in)
- Electrification: 25000 V AC (France); 3000 V DC (Belgium)

The Memling was an express train that linked Gare du Nord in Paris, France, with Brussel Zuid in Brussels, Belgium. The train was named after German painter Hans Memling.

== Trans Europ Express ==
The Memling was introduced together with the TEE Rubens in the TEE-network to cope with the raising number of passengers between Paris and Brussels. Both services were the first in the morning, the Memling departed from Gare du Nord in Paris at 6:45 in the morning, while the Rubens departed from Brussels at 6:42. The return services were scheduled as the fifth of the six daily TEEs in both directions, departing around 6:45 p.m. On 30 May 1984 the TEE-service between Paris and Brussels was reduced to four daily trains in both directions, this meant the end for the Memling as TEE.

== EuroCity ==
The Memling returned into service at the start of the EuroCity network on the link between Ostend and Cologne, the original route of the TEE Saphir. The Memling was replaced by Thalys on 13 December 1997.

== Works cited ==
- Hajt, Jörg (2001). Das grosse TEE Buch (in German). Bonn/Königswinter: Heel Verlag. ISBN 3-89365-948-X.
- Mertens, Maurice; Malaspina, Jean-Pierre (2007). La Légende des Trans Europ Express (in French). Vannes: LR Presse. ISBN 978-29-036514-5-9.
