= Roland (train) =

Train

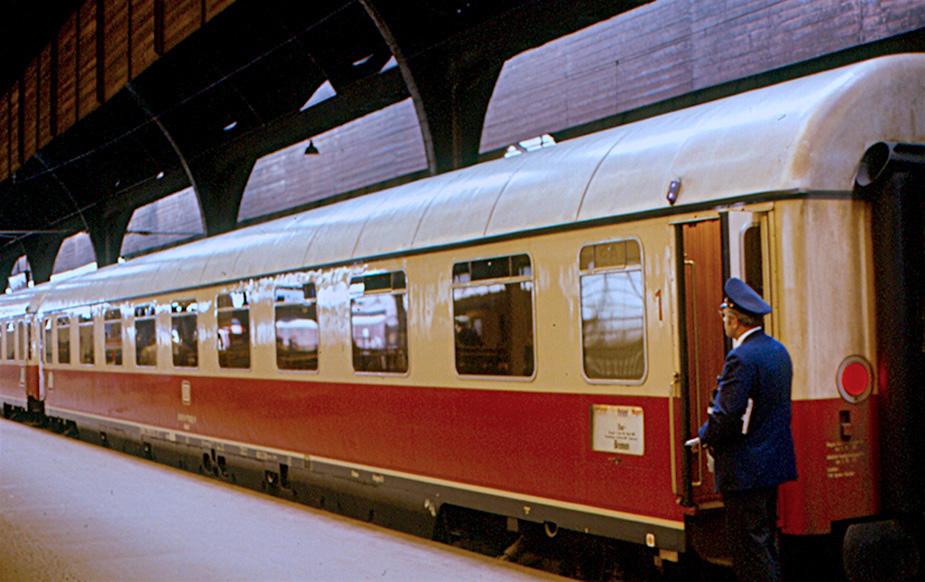
- The TEE Roland at Basel in 1970

Overview
- Service type: Fernschnellzug (FD) (1939); Schnellzug (D or F) (1952–1969); Trans Europ Express (TEE) (1969–1980); InterCity (IC) (1981–1998)
- Status: Discontinued
- Locale: Germany; Switzerland; Italy
- First service: 1939
- Last service: 26 September 1998
- Former operator(s): DRG / Deutsche Bundesbahn / Deutsche Bahn (DB); SBB-CFF-FFS; FS

Route
- Termini: Bremen Hbf / Hamburg-Altona / Berlin; Basel SBB / Mannheim Hbf / Milano Centrale / Stuttgart Hbf / Frankfurt Hbf / Köln Hbf / Bremen Hbf / Oldenburg Hbf
- Service frequency: Daily

Technical
- Track gauge: 1,435 mm (4 ft 8 1/2 in)
- Electrification: 15 kV AC, 16.7 Hz

The Roland (German pronunciation: [ˈʁoːlant]) was an express train that ran in Germany. For part of its existence, it was also an international train. Introduced in 1939, suspended during World War II, and reintroduced in 1952, it was operated in Germany by the Deutsche Reichsbahn Gesellschaft (DRG), the Deutsche Bundesbahn (DB) and the Deutsche Bahn (DB), respectively.

When running internationally, the train was also operated by the Swiss Federal Railways (SBB-CFF-FFS); between 1969 and 1979 its operators included the Italian State Railways (FS).

The train was named after the statue of Roland that was erected in the market square (Rathausplatz) of Bremen, Germany, in 1404 and has since become a symbol of that city. The Roland depicted in the statue was a Frankish military leader under Charlemagne.

Over the years, the termini, route, classification and formation (consist) of the Roland varied significantly. However, in view of the train's name the route always included Bremen Hbf, in Bremen. When introduced in 1939, the Roland was a Fernschnellzug (FD). After its post-war revival in 1952, it ran as a Schnellzug (D). After about 1956, it was a first-class-only F-Zug.

On 1 June 1969, the Roland was upgraded in status to a Trans Europ Express (TEE), running Bremen – Frankfurt – Milan. On 27 May 1979, its route was changed to Bremen – Frankfurt – Stuttgart, and its service was reduced to weekdays-only. This second version of the TEE Roland operated for only one year, last running on 30 May 1980. Its operation was suspended at the start of the summer timetable period, on 1 June, and it was due to resume the following winter and be a winter-only service, but that did not happen. However, after only a one-year hiatus, the Roland returned to the rails in 1981 as a two-class InterCity (IC), initially running Bremen – Basel, shifting in late 1985 to a Hamburg – Cologne – Frankfurt route. It was discontinued in 1998.

== See also ==
- History of rail transport in Germany
- History of rail transport in Italy
- History of rail transport in Switzerland
- List of named passenger trains of Europe
