= Saphir (train) =

Train connecting Ostend, Belgium, and Ruhr, Germany

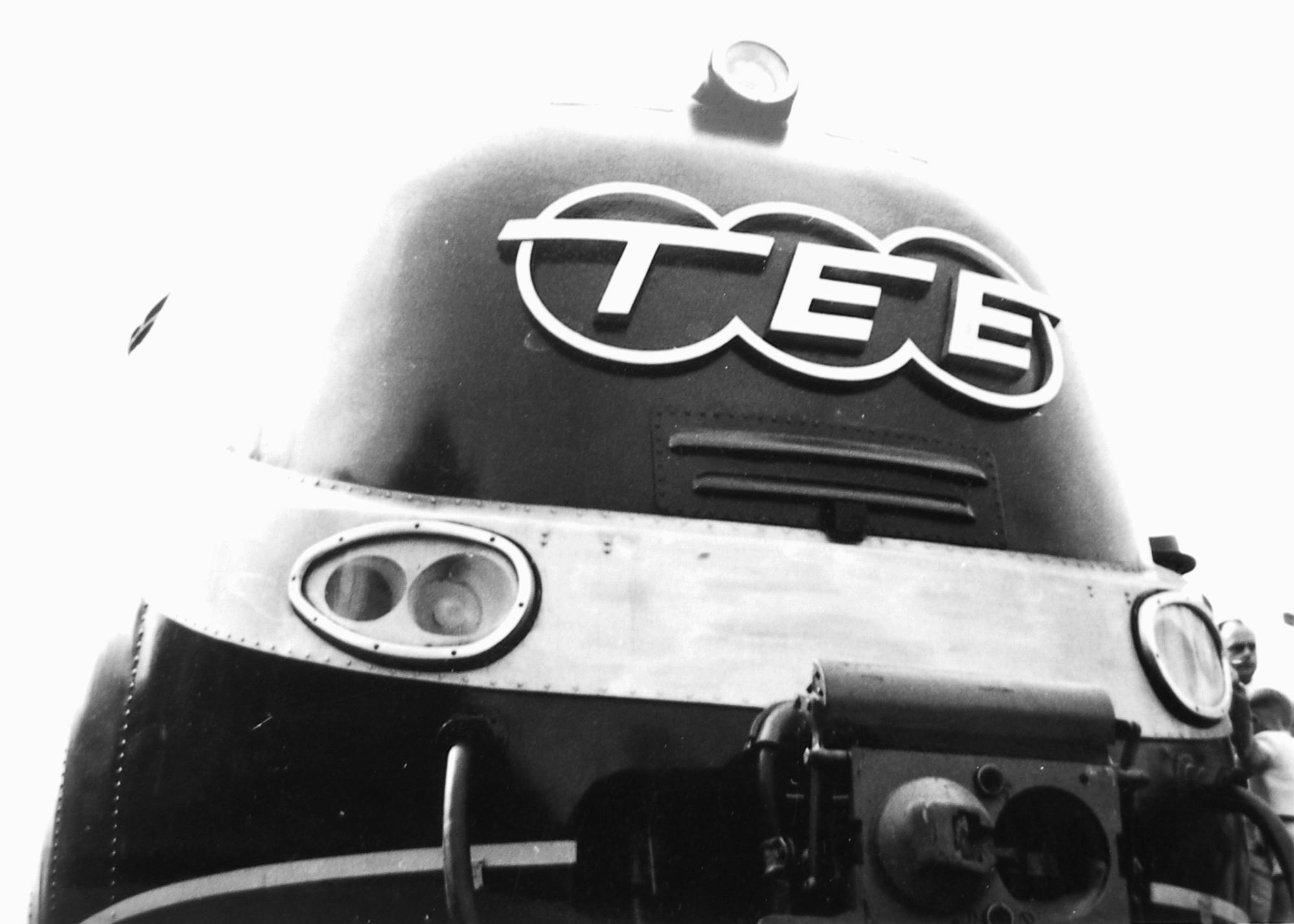

Overview
- Service type: FT (1954–57); Trans Europ Express (TEE) (1957–79); InterCity (IC) (1979–87)
- Status: Replaced by EuroCity Memling
- Locale: Germany; Belgium
- First service: 23 May 1954
- Last service: 30 May 1987
- Former operator: Deutsche Bundesbahn

Route
- Termini: Ostend (1954–66; 1981–87); Brussels (1966–81); Dortmund (1954–58); Frankfurt (1958–80); Cologne (1980–87)
- Service frequency: Daily

Technical
- Track gauge: 1,435 mm (4 ft 8 1/2 in)
Route map
- TEE Saphir (red) and the connecting TEE Rhein–Main (blue) in the 1957 network

The Saphir was an express train operated by the Deutsche Bundesbahn linking the port of Ostend, Belgium, with Dortmund, Germany, as part of a link between London and the Ruhr. In its later years, it operated between Brussels and Frankfurt or Cologne. The name Saphir, German for sapphire, refers to the Belgian gemstone industry.

== History ==
=== Beginnings ===
The initial service started in 1954 as post-war successor of the Ostend–Cologne Pullman Express. Its schedule was coordinated with an Ostend–Dover ferry run and a Dover–London train, and overall the schedule that came into effect with the Saphir's introduction "permitt[ed] passengers leaving London (Victoria) at 10:00 to reach destinations in the Rhine–Ruhr district of Germany some three hours earlier than formerly".

The service used a class DB Class VT 08 diesel multiple unit. In its early years, the Saphir was referred to as the "Sapphire" in English publications, but by 1959 even the English Cook's Continental Timetable was calling it by its German name, Saphir.

=== Trans Europ Express ===
The Saphir was upgraded to a first-class-only Trans Europ Express (TEE) on 2 June 1957. The VT 08 were replaced by DB Class VT 11.5 trainsets as soon as these were available, on 15 July 1957. The timetable was designed to provide a TEE link from Brussels to Frankfurt am Main as well as a connection with the TEE Rhein–Main in Cologne. After one year of service the Saphir's route itself was altered with Frankfurt instead of Dortmund being the German terminus. In 1966, the route was cut back from Ostend to Brussels, making the TEE Saphir's route Brussels–Frankfurt.

=== Post-TEE ===
On 27 May 1979, the Saphir was downgraded to a two-class InterCity train, without any change to its route. In June 1980, the eastern terminus was moved back to the Ruhr district, but to Cologne rather than Dortmund. In 1981, the route was re-extended from Brussels to Ostend, making the Saphir's route now Ostend – Brussels – Cologne.

On 31 May 1987, with the launch of the new EuroCity network, the Saphir was replaced by the EC Memling.

== See also ==
- History of rail transport in Belgium
- History of rail transport in Germany
- List of named passenger trains of Europe

== Works cited ==
- Public relations UIC (1972). TEE (in Dutch). Paris: Union International des Chemins de Fer.
- Goette, Peter (2008). TEE-Züge in Deutschland (in German). Freiburg: EK-Verlag. ISBN 978-3-88255-698-8.
- Mertens, Maurice; Malaspina, Jean-Pierre (2007). La Légende des Trans Europ Express (in French). Vannes: LR Presse. ISBN 978-29-036514-5-9.
