= Arbalète (train) =

European passenger train (1957–1997)

Overview
- Service type: Trans Europ Express (TEE) (1957–1979); InterCity (IC) (1979–1987); EuroCity (EC) (1987–1997)
- Status: Replaced by a TGV
- Locale: France; Switzerland
- First service: 2 June 1957
- Last service: 28 September 1997
- Former operators: SNCF; SBB-CFF-FFS

Route
- Termini: Paris-Est; Zürich HB
- Service frequency: Daily

Technical
- Track gauge: 1,435 mm (4 ft 8 1/2 in)
- Electrification: 15 kV AC, 16.7 Hz (Basel SBB–Zürich HB)
Route map

The Arbalète (alternatively written L'Arbalète) was an express train that linked Paris-Est in Paris, France, with Zürich HB in Zurich, Switzerland. Introduced in 1957, it was operated by the SNCF and the Swiss Federal Railways (SBB-CFF-FFS).

The train was named after the crossbow used by William Tell to hit the apple on his son's head.

Originally, and for 22 years, the Arbalète was a first-class-only Trans Europ Express (TEE). On 27 May 1979, it became a two-class InterCity (IC) train, and on 31 May 1987, it was included in the then-new EuroCity (EC) network. It was discontinued in September 1997, replaced by a TGV service that was routed via Pontarlier and Bern instead of Mulhouse and Basel.

== See also ==
- History of rail transport in France
- History of rail transport in Switzerland
- List of named passenger trains of Europe
