= Gambrinus (train) =

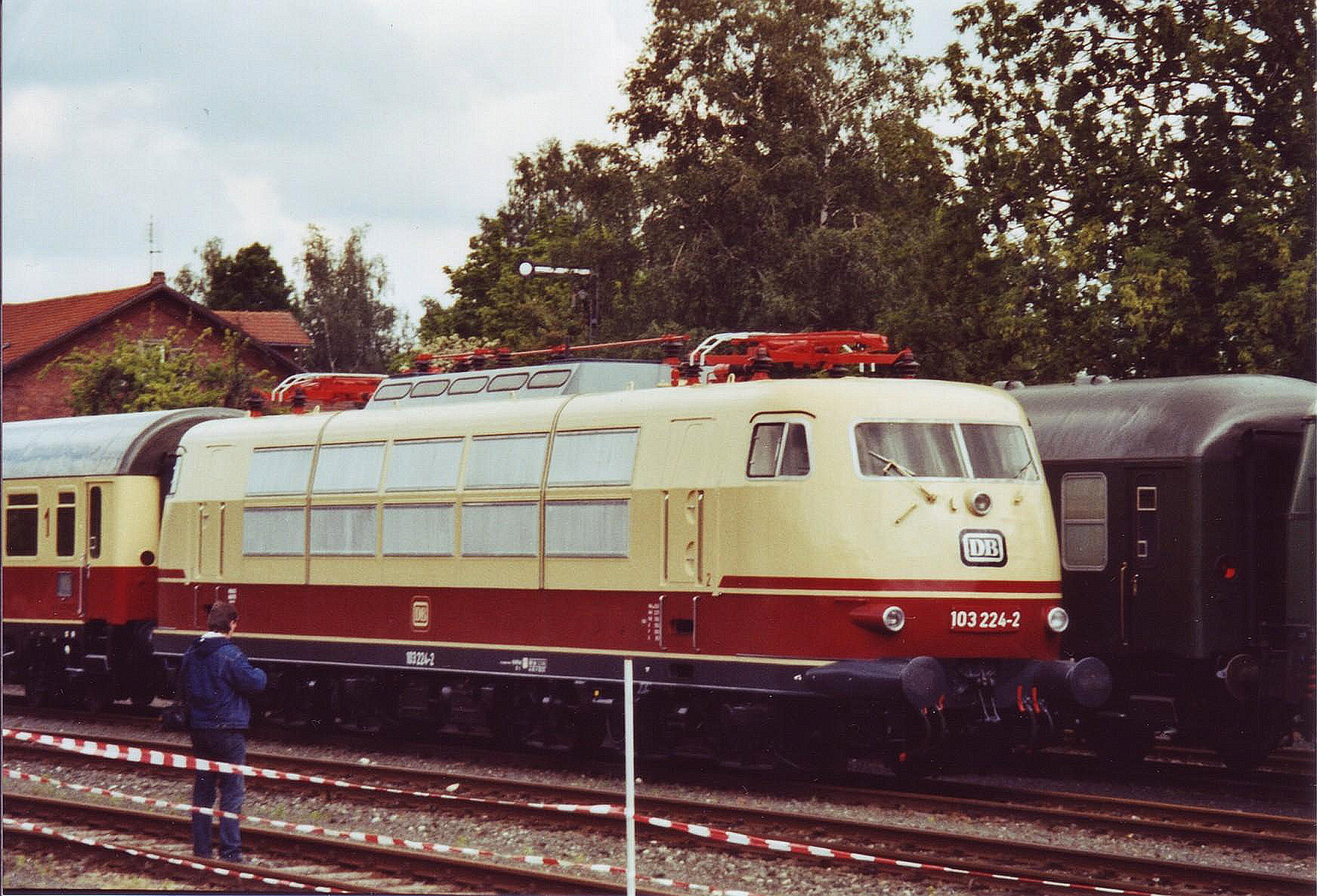
- DB Class 103, Gambrinus' locomotive during the TEE era

Overview
- Service type: F-Zug (1953 – 1971); InterCity(IC) (1971–1978); Trans Europ Express (TEE) (1978–1983); InterCity(IC) (1983–1998)
- Status: Discontinued
- Locale: Germany
- First service: 1 June 1953
- Last service: 23 May 1998
- Former operator: Deutsche Bundesbahn

Technical
- Track gauge: 1,435 mm (4 ft 8 1/2 in)
- Electrification: 15 kV 16,7 Hz (Germany)

The Gambrinus was an express train in Germany, initially linking Munich and Kiel. The train was named after the God of Beer Gambrinus.

== F-Zug ==
On 18 May 1952 the Deutsche Bundesbahn started a trainservice F33/34 between Munich and Kiel via the Ruhr, thus linking two Beer cities Munich and Dortmund. On 1 June 1953 the train was named after Gambrinus referring to the breweries situated in Munich and Dortmund. The route Munich - Würzburg - Frankfurt - Cologne - Dortmund - Hamburg - Kiel stayed unchanged until 2 June 1957 when the Hamburg - Kiel portion was scrapped and the Northern terminus changed to Hamburg Altona.

In 1970 the train was renumbered in F 125/124, in 1971 the numbers were changed twice, first to F 122/123 and after the conversion to a first-class only intercity in September the trainnumbers became IC 112/117 and the Northern terminus was changed to Westerland at Sylt.

== Trans Europ Express ==
During the 1970s the introduction of second-class coaches in intercities was proposed and studied resulting in the IC79 project. Because the Gambrinus was planned to remain a first-class only train it was branded as TEE on 28 May 1978 with trainnumbers TEE 15/14. On 29 May 1979 the trainnumbers were changed to TEE 18/19 and the route changed between Munich and Mainz. Instead of the northern route over Würzburg and the Main valley, the southern route calling at Stuttgart and Heidelberg was used. The coaches to Westerland were conveyed in the Summer only. Decline started in 1980, shortening the route on both sides at 28 September left a service between Stuttgart and Bremen. In 1981 the northern terminus moved farther south to Münster, although through coaches to Hamburg were conveyed on Friday evening returning with the Monday morning service. On 28 May 1982 the northern terminus changed to Dortmund and one year later TEE Gambrinus was discontinued.

== InterCity ==
On 30 May 1983 the Gambrinus continued as InterCity between Stuttgart and Hamburg. From 2 June 1985 until 28 May 1988 the route changed to Munich - Dortmund, on 29 May 1988 the route changed to Munich - Hanover until the opening of German's first highspeed railway, connecting the same cities, on 2 June 1991. The Gambrinus was revived on 29 May 1994 between Karlsruhe and Dortmund, one year later extended farther East to Berlin. On 23 May 1998 the Gambrinus was withdrawn from service.

== Works cited ==
- Hajt, Jörg (2001). Das grosse TEE Buch (in German). Bonn/Königswinter: Heel Verlag. ISBN 3-89365-948-X.
- Mertens, Maurice; Malaspina, Jean-Pierre (2007). La Légende des Trans Europ Express (in French). Vannes: LR Presse. ISBN 978-29-036514-5-9.
- Goette, Peter (2008). TEE-Züge in Deutschland (in German). Freiburg: EK-Verlag. ISBN 978-3-88255-698-8.
