= Watteau (train) =

French express train

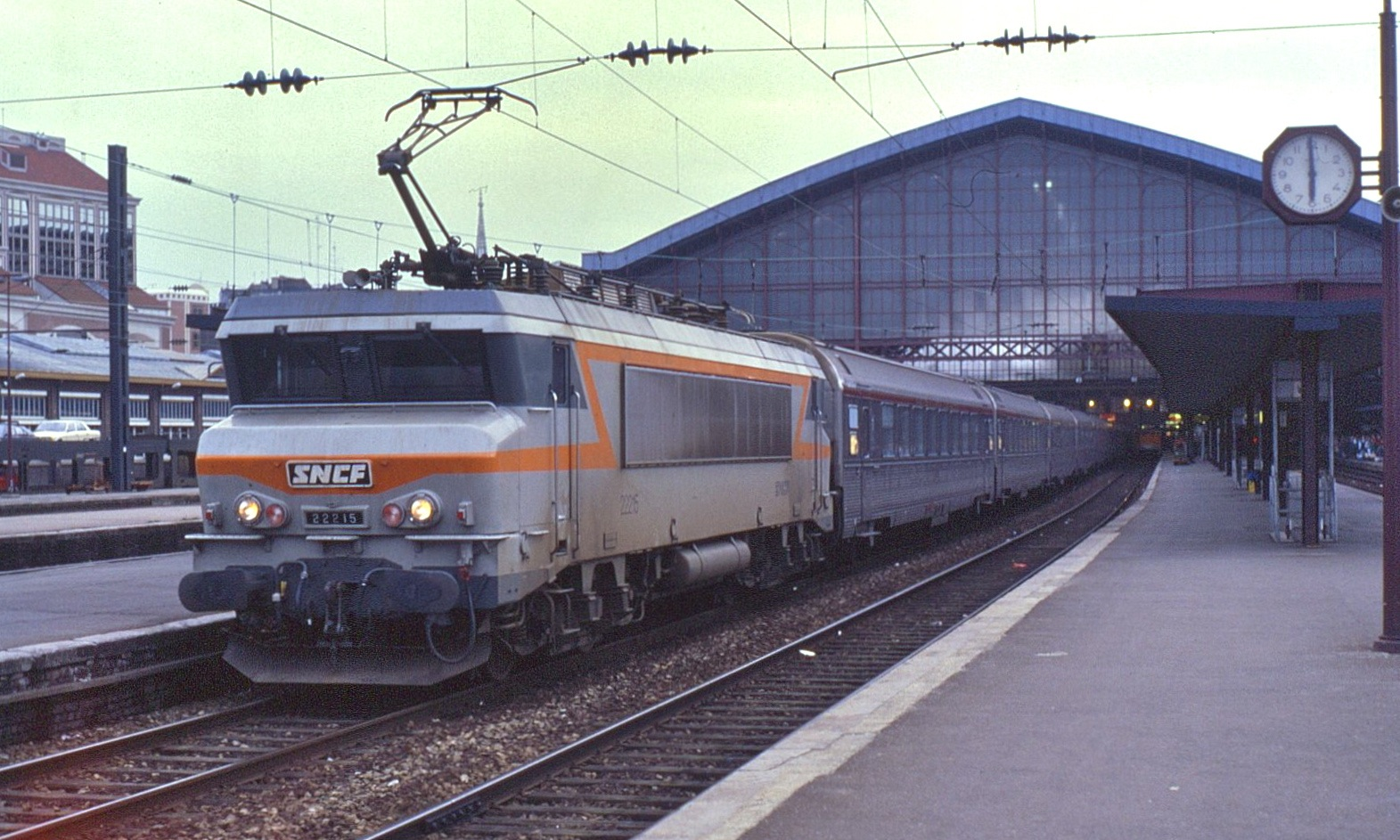
- The TEE Watteau at Gare de Lille Flandres in 1989

Overview
- Service type: Trans Europ Express (TEE) (1978–1991); Trans Europ Express (TEE) (1993–1995)
- Locale: France; Belgium
- First service: 8 October 1978
- Last service: 26 May 1995
- Former operator: SNCF

Route
- Termini: Gare du Nord, Paris; Tourcoing / Brussels
- Service frequency: Weekdays

Technical
- Track gauge: 1,435 mm (4 ft 8 1/2 in)
- Electrification: 25 kV AC (France); 3000 V DC (Belgium)

The Watteau was an express train that linked Gare du Nord in Paris, France, with Tourcoing in the North of France. The train was named after the French painter Antoine Watteau.

One year before the creating of the TEE-network the French railway SNCF introduced three Trains d'affaires to link Paris with the industrial area in the North near the Belgian border. This trains were scheduled with a morning, midday and evening service in both directions. Initially the service was operated with RGP 600 DMUs. In 1959 these were replaced by locomotive hauled trains consisting of Corail coaches. Although domestic TEE-services were allowed from 1965 the Trains d'affaires were not upgraded until 1978. Together with the upgrading to TEE the trains were named. The evening service pair was named Watteau. In 1991 the service between Tourcoing and Paris was converted to a two-class Rapide. The Watteau revived in the Paris- Brussels service on 23 May 1993 for two years. On 26 May 1995 the Watteau was the last TEE service.

== Works cited ==
- Hajt, Jörg (2001). Das grosse TEE Buch (in German). Bonn/Königswinter: Heel Verlag. ISBN 3-89365-948-X.
- Mertens, Maurice; Malaspina, Jean-Pierre (2007). La Légende des Trans Europ Express (in French). Vannes: LR Presse. ISBN 978-29-036514-5-9.
