= Helvetia (train) =

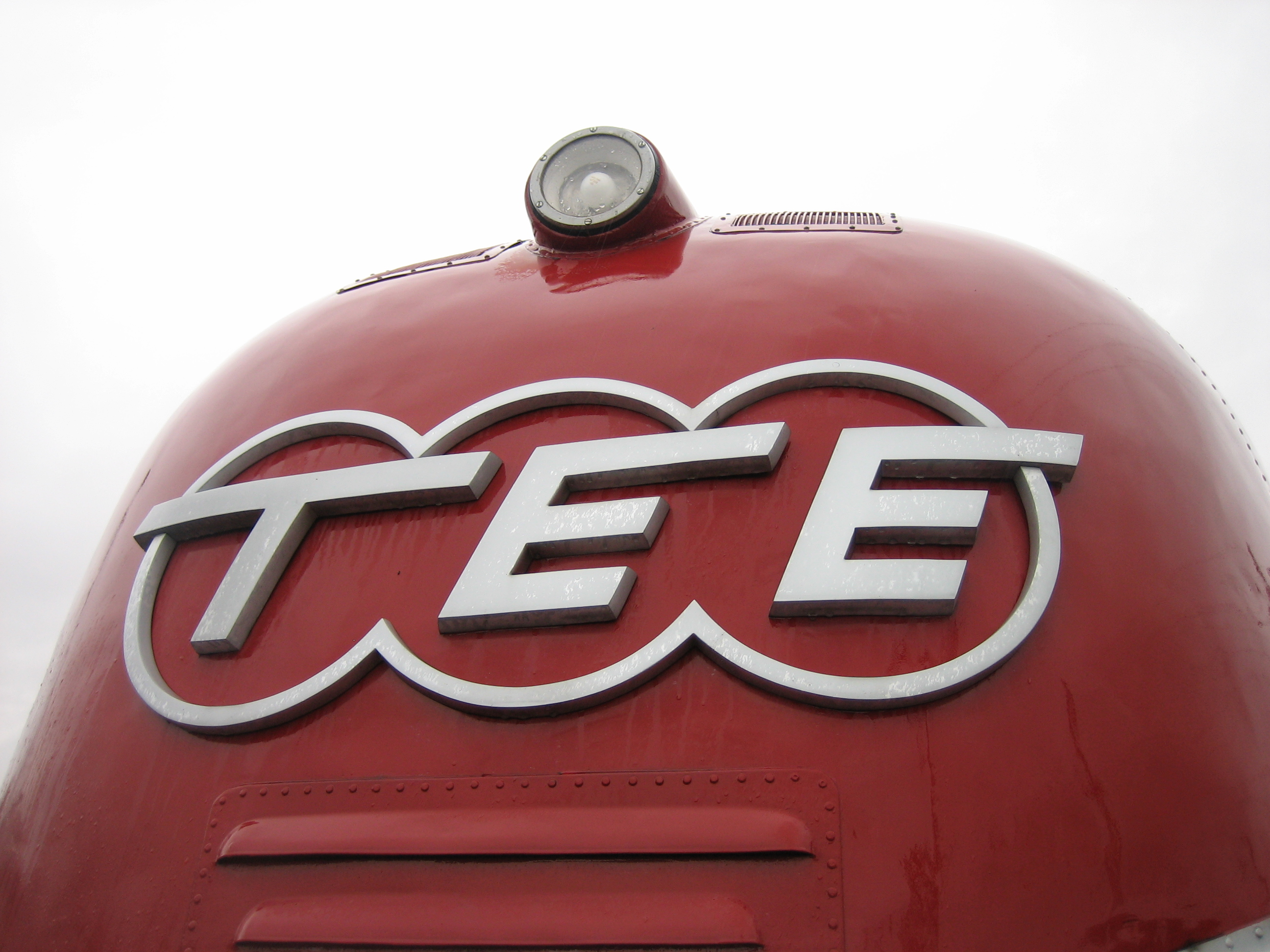

Overview
- Service type: Fernschnellzug (F) (1952–1957); Trans Europ Express (TEE) (1957–1979); Intercity (IC) (1979–1987); EuroCity (EC) (1987–1991); Intercity-Express (ICE) (1992–2002)
- Status: No longer a named train
- Locale: Germany; Switzerland
- First service: 18 May 1952
- Last service: 2002
- Former operator(s): Deutsche Bundesbahn / Deutsche Bahn (DB); SBB-CFF-FFS

Route
- Termini: Hamburg-Altona; Zürich HB
- Service frequency: Daily

Technical
- Track gauge: 1,435 mm (4 ft 8 1/2 in)
- Electrification: 15 kV AC, 16.7 Hz
Route map

The Helvetia was an express train that, for most of its existence, linked Hamburg-Altona station in Hamburg, Germany, with Zürich HB in Zurich, Switzerland. Introduced in 1952, it was operated by the Deutsche Bundesbahn / Deutsche Bahn (DB) and the Swiss Federal Railways (SBB-CFF-FFS). The train's name, Helvetia, is the Latin word for "Switzerland".

Initially, the Helvetia was a Schnellzug (D), later a Fernschnellzug (F - although actually diesel multiple units were used on this service). In 1957, it became a first-class-only Trans Europ Express (TEE). On 27 May 1979, it was reclassified as a two-class Intercity (IC), and on 31 May 1987, it was included in the then-new EuroCity (EC) network. Following a brief hiatus in 1991–1992, it was reintroduced as an Intercity-Express (ICE). It ceased to be a named train at the end of 2002.

On 12 August 1965, the Helvetia was involved in a serious collision in Lampertheim, Hesse, in which the train formation (consist) was severely damaged, and four people died.

== See also ==
- History of rail transport in Germany
- History of rail transport in Switzerland
- List of named passenger trains of Europe
