= L'Oiseau Bleu (train) =

Oiseau Bleu
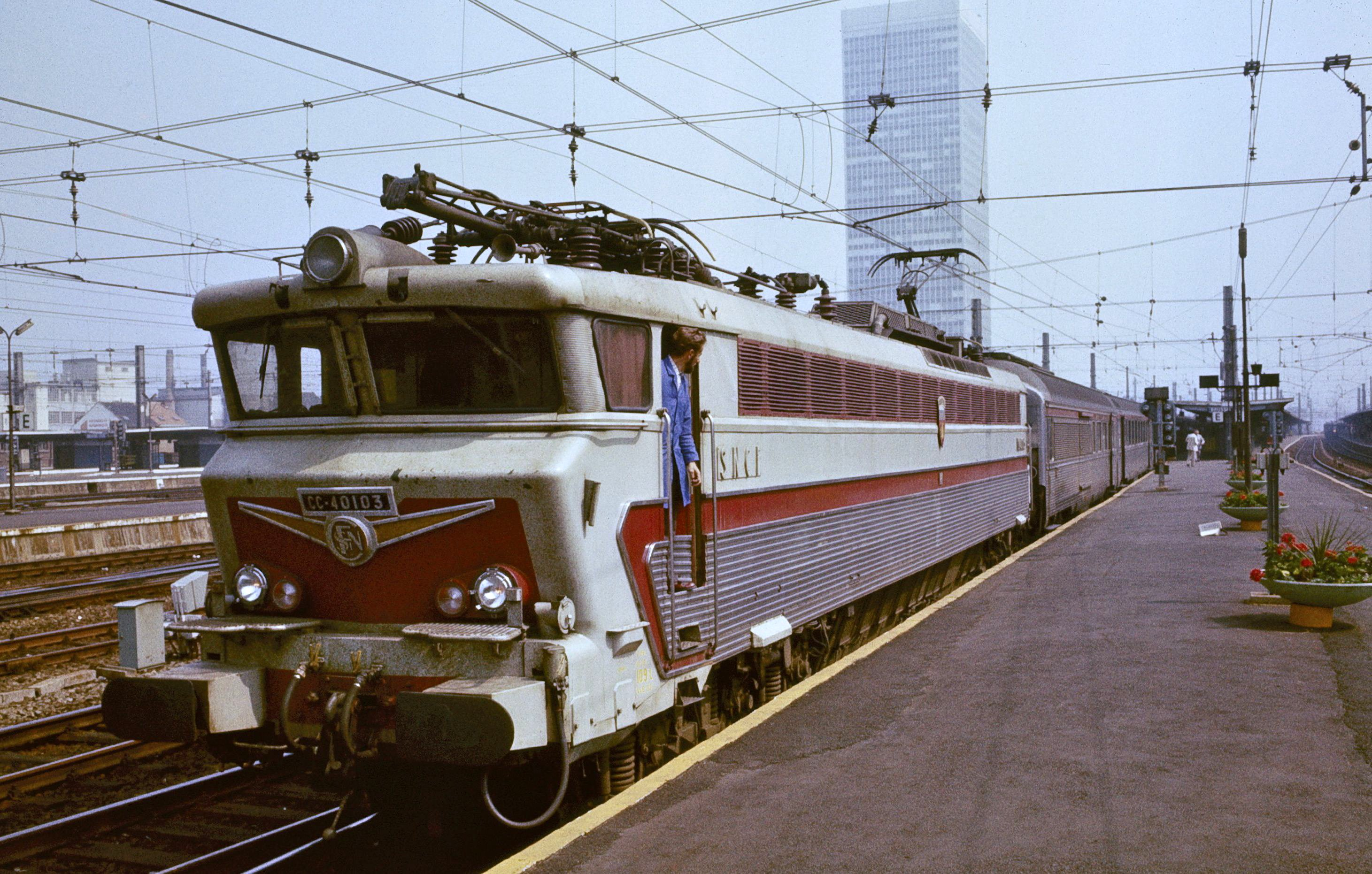
- The TEE Oiseau Bleu at Brussels-South station in 1979

Overview
- Service type: CIWL (1929-1939); Express train (1947-1957); Trans Europ Express (TEE) (1957–1984)
- Locale: Belgium; France
- First service: 16 May 1929
- Last service: 3 June 1984
- Former operator(s): CIWL; SBB-CFF-FFS; SNCF; NMBS/SNCB

Route
- Termini: Antwerp; Paris
- Distance travelled: 363 km
- Service frequency: Daily

Technical
- Track gauge: 1,435 mm (4 ft 8 1/2 in)
- Electrification: 3 kV DC (Belgium); 25 kV 50 Hz AC (France)
Route map
- PBA routes; Oiseau Bleu red, Thalys blue

L'Oiseau Bleu (or the Oiseau Bleu) was an international express train linking Antwerp with Paris. The train was named after the play L'Oiseau Bleu as a tribute to its author, the Belgian Nobel Prize laureate Maurice Maeterlinck.

== Wagon-Lits Pullman train ==
The Oiseau Bleu started as a luxury train operated by the Compagnie Internationale des Wagons-Lits as their second Pullman service between Belgium and France.

Timetable of 1929:

AP	country	station	km	PA
09:30	Belgium	Antwerpen Centraal	0	22:36
10:29	Belgium	Brussels-South (Midi/Zuid)	53	21:38
14:00	France	Paris Nord	363	18:05

Due to good loading figures the service was extended to Amsterdam on 15 May 1935, making the Oiseau Bleu the "mirror" of the Étoile du Nord. The outbreak of World War II interrupted the service. On 1 June 1947 the train service was restarted on the Paris – Brussels portion, conveying two through coaches from and to Antwerp and Amsterdam. However, by at least 1949, the through coaches to points north of Brussels had been discontinued and the Oiseau Bleu – also called the Blue Bird Express during that era – was again running only Brussels–Paris and return, with first- and second-class Pullman cars.

== Trans Europ Express ==
On 2 June 1957 the Oiseau Bleu was one of the initial services at the start of the Trans Europ Express (TEE) network. Until 31 May 1964 the Oiseau Bleu was part of the joint Dutch–Swiss TEE service provided by RAm-type diesel multiple unit trainsets. The Dutch and Swiss railways scheduled the use of each TEE trainset on a five-day cycle:
Day 1 Zürich–Amsterdam (TEE Edelweiss), Day 2 Amsterdam–Paris (TEE Étoile du Nord) in the morning and Paris–Brussels (TEE Oiseau Bleu) in the evening, Day 3 Brussels – Paris (TEE Oiseau Bleu) in the morning and Paris–Amsterdam (TEE Étoile du Nord) in the evening, Day 4 Amsterdam–Zürich (TEE Edelweiss), Day 5 maintenance in Zürich.

On 31 May 1964 the RAm trainsets were withdrawn from the PBA (Paris–Brussels–Amsterdam) route, and the train became locomotive-hauled. However, the Inox-PBA-class coaches planned for use on the Oiseau Bleu were not available until 2 August 1964, so for two months the train was operated with ordinary French first-class coaches and a Wagon-Lits dining car, and then converted to Inox-PBA coaches, which included Wagon-Lits meal service direct to passengers' seats. The Oiseau Bleu operated by French and Belgian railways stayed in service until the reorganisation of 1984. On 3 June 1984 the Oiseau Bleu was discontinued.

Timetable of 1971:

TEE 80	country	station	km	TEE 87
07:13	Belgium	Brussels-Nord	0	23:30
07:19	Belgium	Brussels-South (Midi/Zuid)	6	10:23
08:01	Belgium	Mons	61	22:50
08:46	France	St Quentin	162	22:04
09:57	France	Paris Nord	316	20:54

== Works cited ==
- Werbeamt der DB (1971). Vorfahrt in Europa, TEE 1971/72 (in German). Frankfurt am Main: Deutsche Bundesbahn.
- Centre for publicrelations UIC (1972). TEE (in Dutch). Paris: Union International des Chemins de Fer.
- Van Oostrom, Martin (1997). De Nederlands-Zwitserse TEE (in Dutch). Utrecht: Uquilair. ISBN 90-71513-28-9.
- Mühl, Albert; Klein, Jürgen (1998). 125 Jahre/Ans/Years Internationale Schlafwagengesellschaft/Compagnie Internationale des Wagons-Lits (in German and French). Freiburg: EK-Verlag. ISBN 3-88255-684-6.
- Hajt, Jörg (2001). Das grosse TEE Buch (in German). Bonn/Königswinter: Heel Verlag. ISBN 3-89365-948-X.
- Mertens, Maurice; Malaspina, Jean-Pierre (2007). La Légende des Trans Europ Express (in French). Vannes: LR Presse. ISBN 978-29-036514-5-9.
