= Faidherbe (train) =

Overview
- Service type: Trans Europ Express (TEE) (1978–1991)
- Locale: France
- First service: 8 October 1978
- Last service: 31 May 1991
- Former operator: SNCF

Route
- Termini: Gare du Nord, Paris; Lille
- Service frequency: Weekdays

Technical
- Track gauge: 1,435 mm (4 ft 8 1/2 in)
- Electrification: 25000 V AC 50 Hz (France)

The Faidherbe (French pronunciation: [fɛdɛʁb]) was an express train that linked Gare du Nord in Paris, France, with Lille in the North of France. The train was named after the Lille born governor of Senegal, General Louis Faidherbe.

One year before the creating of the TEE-network the French railway SNCF introduced three Trains d'affaires to link Paris with the industrial area in the North near the Belgian border. This trains were scheduled with a morning, midday and evening service in both directions. Initially the service was operated with RGP 600 DMUs. In 1959 these were replaced by locomotive hauled trains consisting of Corail coaches. Although domestic TEE-services were allowed from 1965 the Trains d'affaires were not upgraded until 1978. Together with the upgrading to TEE the trains were named. The morning service pair was named Faidherbe, departing 7:01 from Lille and 7:30 from Paris.

== Works cited ==
- Hajt, Jörg (2001). Das grosse TEE Buch (in German). Bonn/Königswinter: Heel Verlag. ISBN 3-89365-948-X.
- Mertens, Maurice; Malaspina, Jean-Pierre (2007). La Légende des Trans Europ Express (in French). Vannes: LR Presse. ISBN 978-29-036514-5-9.
