= Le Lyonnais (train) =

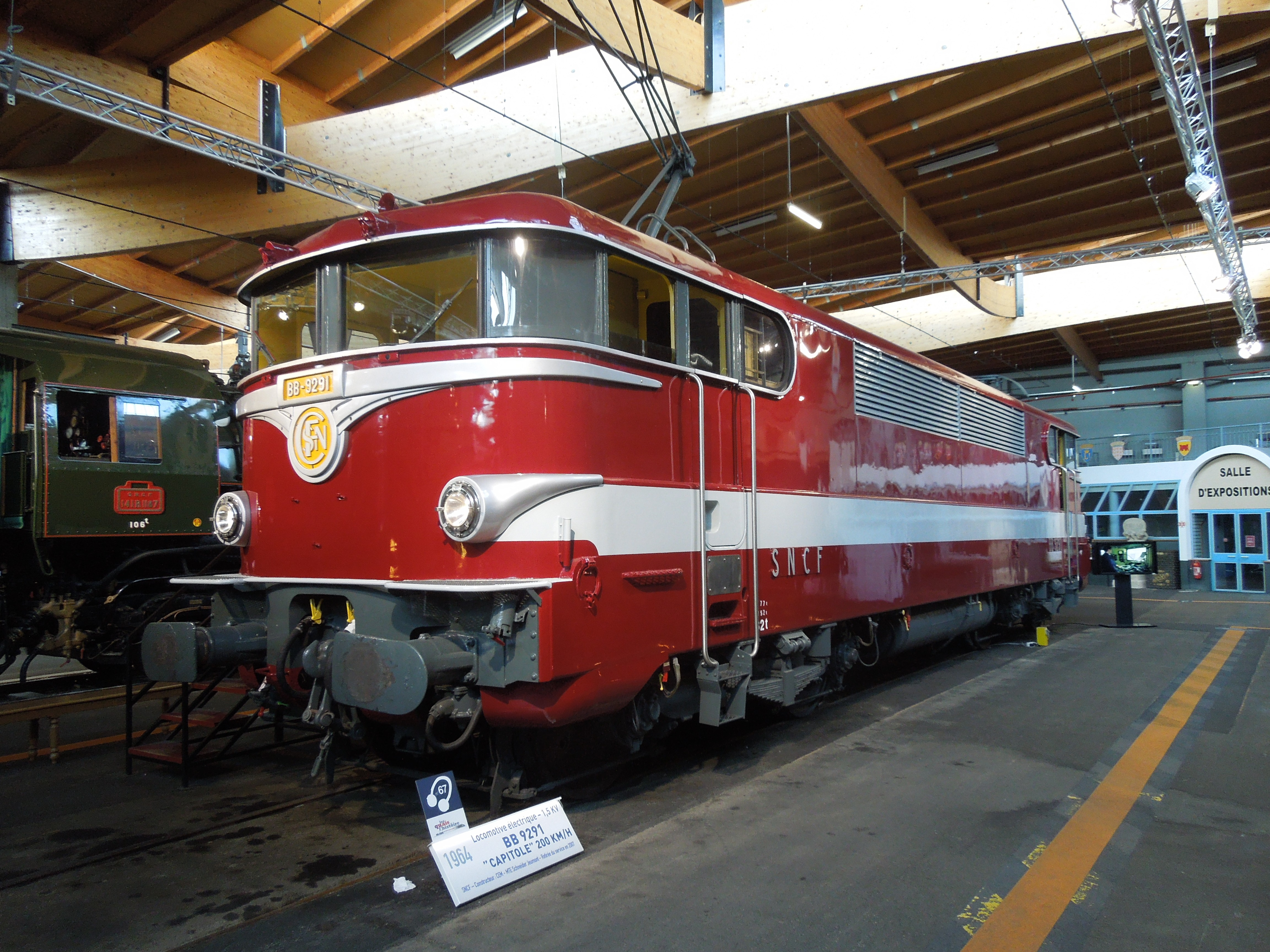
- A preserved BB 9200 locomotive

Overview
- Service type: Rapide (1968–1969); Trans Europ Express (TEE) (1969–1976); Rapide (1976–1981)
- Status: Replaced by a TGV
- Locale: France
- First service: 1968
- Last service: 1981
- Former operator(s): SNCF

Route
- Termini: Paris-Gare de Lyon; Lyon-Perrache
- Distance travelled: 512 km (318 mi)
- Train number(s): TEE 5, 6 (1969–1971); TEE 13,12 (1971–1976)
- Line(s) used: Paris–Marseille

On-board services
- Class(es): First-class-only (1969–1976)

Technical
- Rolling stock: SNCF Class BB 9200 / SNCF Class CC 6500; DEV Inox coaches
- Track gauge: 1,435 mm (4 ft 8 1/2 in)
- Electrification: 1.5 kV DC

Le Lyonnais, or the Lyonnais, was an express train that linked Paris and Lyon in France. Introduced in 1968, it was operated by the Société Nationale des Chemins de fer français (SNCF). The train is named after the geographical area known as the Lyonnais, a historical (former) French province, whose name came from the city of Lyon.

Initially, Le Lyonnais was a Rapide. From 1969 to 1976, it was a first-class-only Trans Europ Express (TEE). It was then downgraded back to a Rapide until 1981, when it was replaced by a TGV. Its last day of operation was 26 September 1981, as the next day saw the introduction of the first TGV service in France, in the same corridor.

== Route ==
Le Lyonnais's route was the first 512 km (318 mi) of the Paris–Marseille railway. The train had the following stops:

- Paris-Gare de Lyon – Dijon-Ville – Lyon-Perrache

== Formation (consist) ==
Initially, Le Lyonnais was usually hauled by one of SNCF's four-axle 1.5 kV DC, Class BB 9200 electric locomotives. In the 1970s, this class was replaced by the newer six-axle Class CC 6500.

When Le Lyonnais became a TEE in 1969, its formation of rolling stock was a rake of SNCF Mistral 56-type DEV Inox coaches, being a Ds, six A8, one A5ru and a Compagnie Internationale des Wagons-Lits (CIWL) pullman car.

In 1971, the train's rolling stock was upgraded to Mistral 69-type DEV Inoxes, with the formation being an A4Dtux, four A8u, two A8tu, one A3rtu and a Vru.

Throughout Le Lyonnais's existence, its dining car was staffed by the CIWL.

== See also ==
- History of rail transport in France
- List of named passenger trains of Europe
