= Ligure (train) =

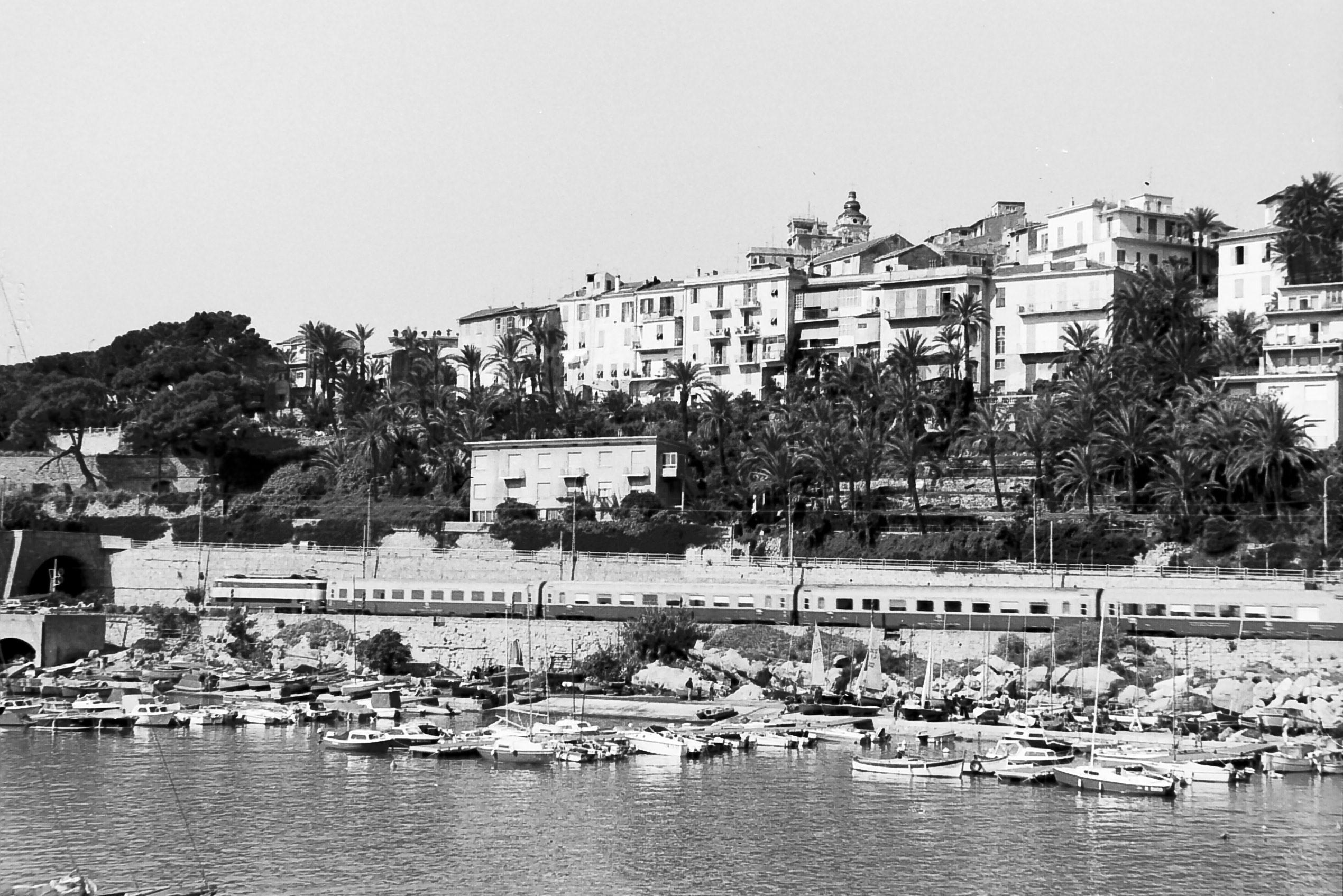
- Avignon-bound Ligure at Bordighera, 1975

Overview
- Service type: Trans Europ Express (TEE) (1957–1982); InterCity (1979–2005); EuroCity (2005-2009)
- Status: Discontinued
- Locale: France; Monaco; Italy
- First service: 12 August 1957
- Last service: 13 December 2009
- Former operator: Ferrovie dello Stato

Route
- Termini: Milan; Avignon
- Service frequency: Daily

Technical
- Track gauge: 1,435 mm (4 ft 8 1/2 in)
Route map
- TEE Ligure in 1957

The Ligure was an international express train operated by the Italian Railways linking Milan with the Côte d'Azur. The train was named after the Italian region Liguria which was served by the train.

== Trans Europ Express ==
The Ligure was planned to be one of the initial TEE services at the start of the network at 2 June 1957. However the rolling stock was late itself and the service couldn't start before 12 August 1957. Initially the service linked Milan with Marseille calling at several cities, as Genoa, Monaco and Nice and tourist resorts along the Mediterranean coast. The Aln 442-448 diesel multiple units attracted more and more passengers over the years and by 1966 the train was coupled with an Ale-840 on the Italian stretch to cope with the raising number of travellers.

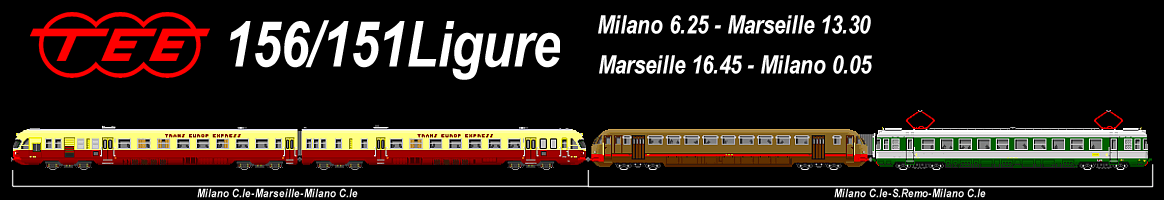
TEE Ligure formation: Aln 442–448 in TEE colours (left) and the Ale-840 (right)

In 1969 the route was prolonged further west to Avignon in order to provide a TEE link between Milan and Barcelona using the newly introduced TEE Catalan Talgo and the TEE Ligure. The timetable was changed in a way that passengers could change from the Catalan Talgo to the Ligure and vice versa in Avignon at around 3 p.m. The formation was changed as well to two Aln 442-448 coupled between Milan and Nice.

Timetable in 1971 (while France, Monaco and Italy are all in the Central European time zone, France did not observe Daylight Saving Time until 1976 whilst Italy did since 1966; the real travel time between Monaco and Ventimiglia is only 17 minutes).

TEE 47/48	country	station	km	TEE 45/46
15:30	France	Avignon	0	14:47
16:38	France	Marseille St Charles	121	13:34
17:16	France	Toulon	188	12:52
18:08	France	St. Raphael	282	12:02
18:30	France	Cannes	315	11:41
18:39	France	Antibes	326	11:32
18:55	France	Nice Ville	346	11:19
19:12	Monaco	Monaco Monte Carlo	362	11:05
20:30	Italy	Ventimiglia	381	11:45
20:48	Italy	San Remo	397	11:33
21:10	Italy	Imperia	420	11:12
22:05	Italy	Savona	489	10:09
22:42	Italy	Genova Piazza Principe	532	09:32
00:20	Italy	Milano Centrale	683	07:55

On 1 October 1972 the rolling stock was replaced by Gran Conforto coaches hauled by an electric locomotive class E 444.

== Intercity ==
On 22 May 1982 the route was shortened to Milan - Nice. At the same time 2nd-class coaches were introduced and the train was transformed into an Intercity service with 16 stops. It didn't met the EuroCity criteria and it lasted until 2005 before the EuroCity label was granted. In December 2009 the Ligure was withdrawn.

== See also ==
- History of rail transport in France
- History of rail transport in Italy
- List of EuroCity services
- List of named passenger trains of Europe
- TEE carriages of FS
