= Colosseum (train) =

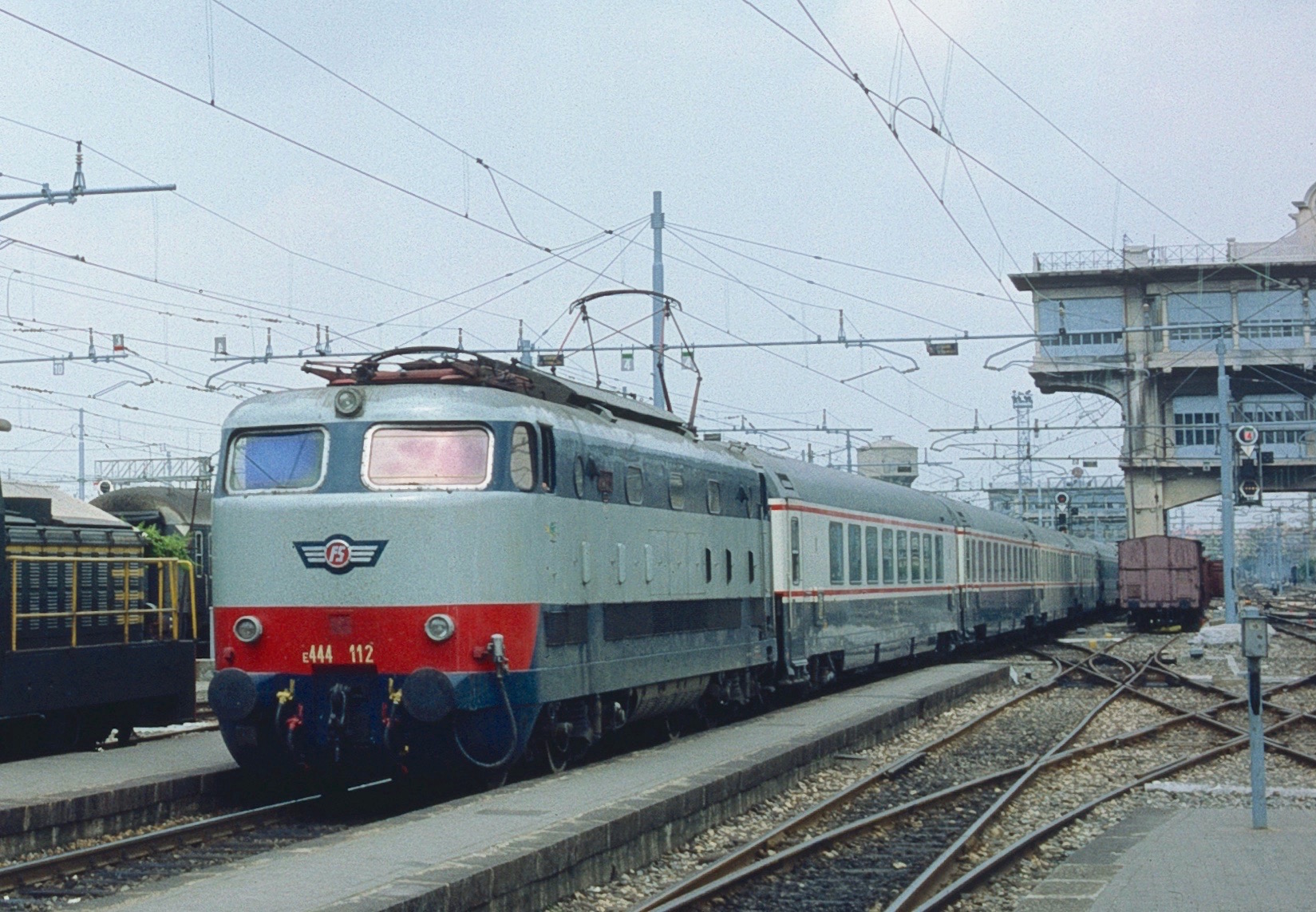
- The TEE Colosseum arriving at Milano Centrale station in 1985

Overview
- Service type: Trans Europ Express (TEE) (1984–1987); InterCity (IC) (1987–1989); EuroCity (EC) (1989–1997)
- Locale: West Germany / Germany; Switzerland; Italy
- Predecessor: TEE Settebello
- First service: 3 June 1984
- Last service: 31 May 1997
- Current operator: /
- Former operators: Deutsche Bundesbahn; Ferrovie dello Stato

Route
- Termini: Rome; Milan / Frankfurt am Main

Technical
- Track gauge: 1,435 mm (4 ft 8 1/2 in)
- Electrification: 15 kV 16.7 Hz (Germany & Switzerland); 3,000 V DC (Italy)

The Colosseum was an express train initially linking Rome and Milan, later Frankfurt am Main. The train was named after the Amphitheatrum Flavium, renowned as the Colosseum.

== Trans Europ Express ==
The Colosseum was the successor to the TEE Settebello on the same route and schedule. The ETR 300 rolling stock was replaced by locomotive-hauled coaches of the Gran Conforto class. Since the name Settebello was widely associated with the ETR 300 stock, the name of the Milan – Rome service was changed as well. On 3 June 1984, the service continued as TEE Colosseum (or Colosseo in Italian). The train was hauled by FS Class E.444 locomotives and used the Gran Conforto coaches that had been used in the TEE Adriatico until 2 June 1984. After three years of service as a TEE, the Colosseum was converted to a two-class InterCity.

== EuroCity ==
On 28 May 1989, the route was extended further north to Frankfurt am Main and, being international, the train qualified as EuroCity. The coaches for the EuroCity service were provided by Deutsche Bundesbahn. In 1991, the German InterCityExpress (ICE) started with the opening of the Hanover – Würzburg high-speed railway. This meant a reorganisation of the long-distance train services that affected the EuroCitys as well. Travellers to Frankfurt could use the ICE north of Basel, but the Rhine valley further north did not yet have a high-speed service, and the number of EuroCitys there was increased. Travellers from Milan to Germany could use the EC Verdi, but this train did not operate south of Milan. The Colosseum was shortened to the Rome – Basel portion, which continued in operation until 31 May 1997. On 1 June 1997, Cisalpino introduced ETR 470 tilting trains between Milan and Basel, which replaced the EC Colosseum.

== Works cited ==
- Hajt, Jörg (2001). Das grosse TEE Buch (in German). Bonn/Königswinter: Heel Verlag. ISBN 3-89365-948-X.
- Mertens, Maurice; Malaspina, Jean-Pierre (2007). La Légende des Trans Europ Express (in French). Vannes: LR Presse. ISBN 978-29-036514-5-9.
