= Grandi Stazioni =

Company

- Company type: S.p.A.
- Industry: Rail transport
- Founded: 1998
- Headquarters: Rome, Italy
- Key people: Riccardo Maria Monti, President; Paolo Gallo, CEO
- Products: Rail transport, transport, Services, more...
- Revenue: €180.47 million (2008)
- Net income: €15.02 million (2008)
- Number of employees: 227 (2008)
- Parent: Ferrovie dello Stato
- Subsidiaries: Grandi Stazioni Servizi Srl (management of toilets and left luggage); Grandi Stazioni Immobiliare Srl (management of real estate owned by the company); Grandi Stazioni Pubblicità Srl (commercial publicity); Grandi Stazioni Edicole Srl (management of a network of kiosks)
- Website: www.grandistazioni.it/content/grandiStazioni/en.html

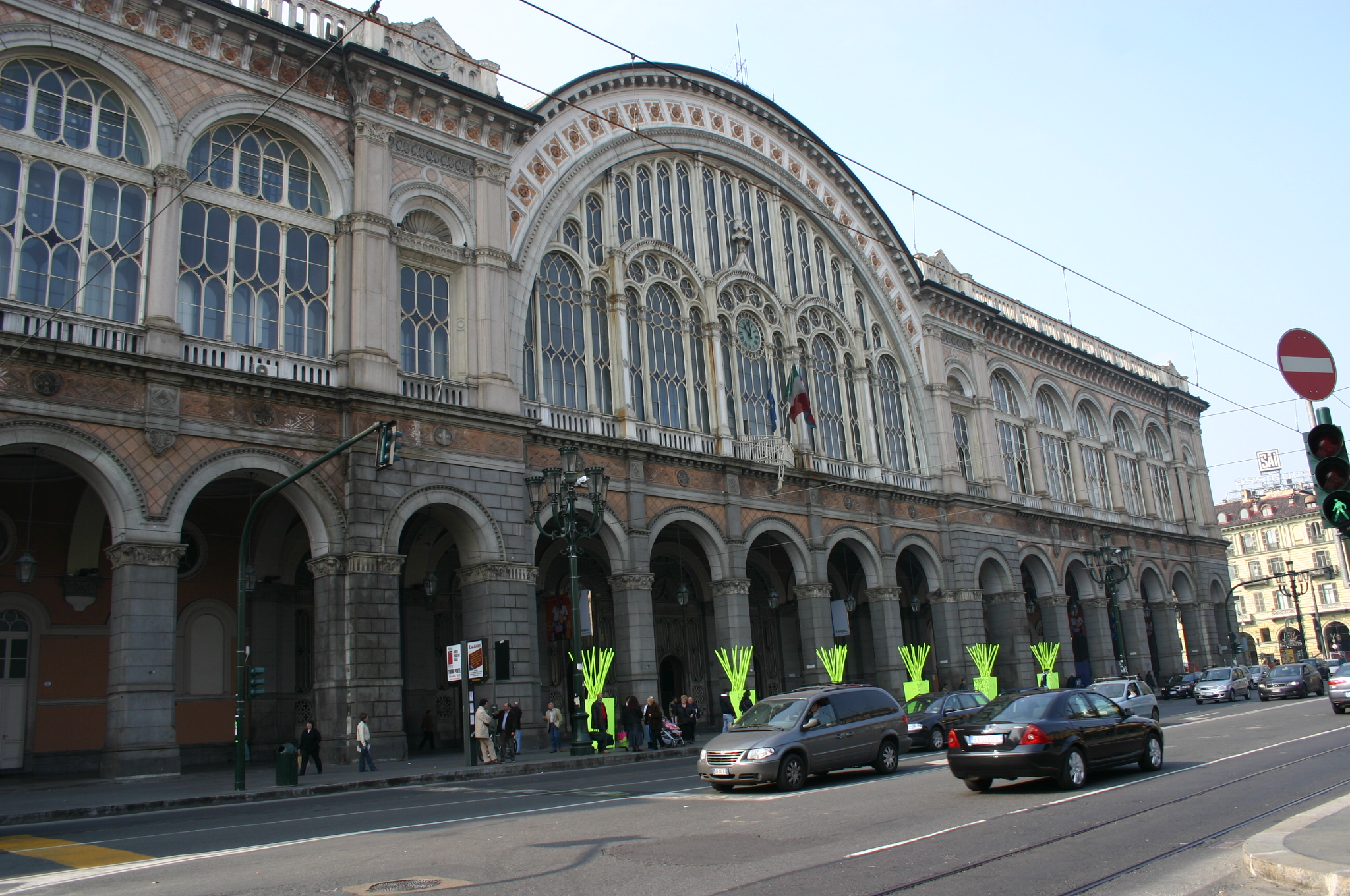
Torino Porta Nuova

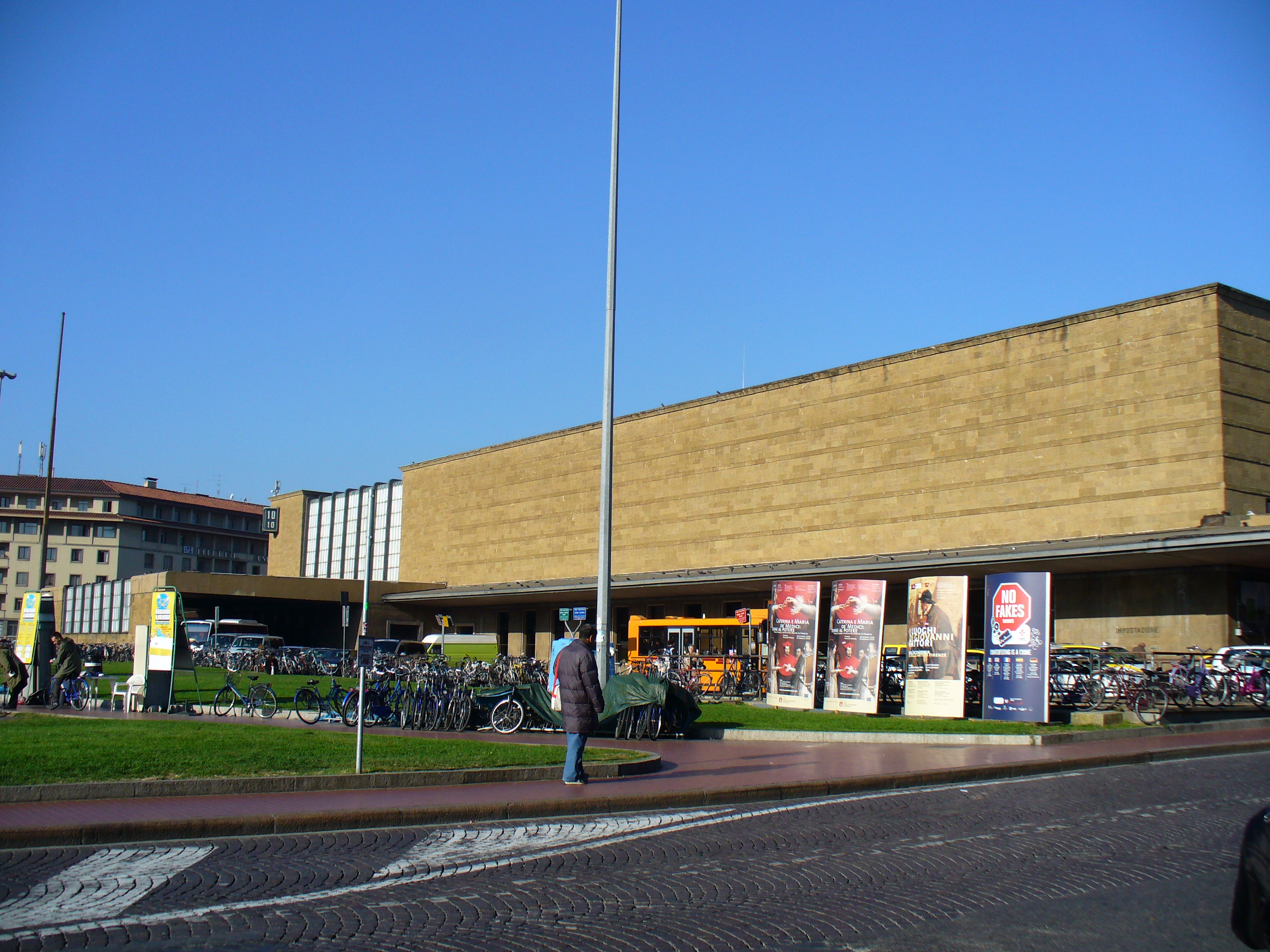
Firenze Santa Maria Novella

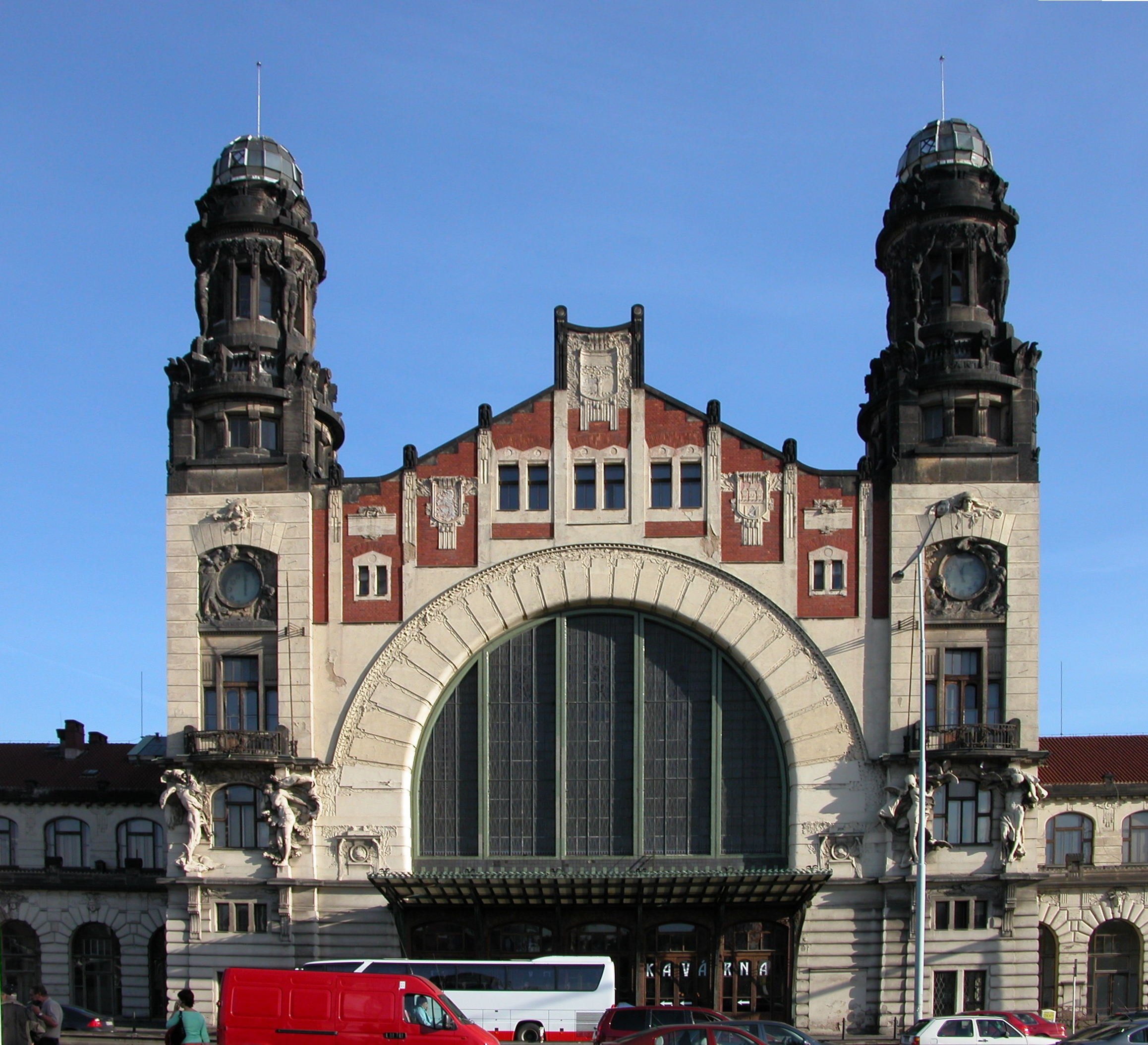
The former main entrance of Praha hlavní nádraží, that was operated by Grandi Stazioni

Grandi Stazioni S.p.A. (English: Great Stations) is a member company of Italy's Ferrovie dello Stato (English: State Railways) group. It was created to rehabilitate and manage, even commercially, the 13 biggest Italian railway stations.

== Stations under management ==
The Roma Termini railway station was the pilot of the Grandi Stazioni program.

The Italian railway stations currently operated by the group are:

Station	Ridership (mln riders/yr)
Bari Centrale	14
Bologna Centrale	58
Firenze Santa Maria Novella	59
Genova Brignole	22
Genova Piazza Principe	24
Milano Centrale	120
Napoli Centrale	50
Palermo Centrale	19
Roma Termini	150
Roma Tiburtina	51
Torino Porta Nuova	70
Venezia Mestre	31
Venezia Santa Lucia	30
Verona Porta Nuova	25

Stations with darker background are not served by High-speed trains

In addition to these, the forthcoming Napoli Afragola and Firenze Belfiore stations, which will be part of Italian high-speed rail system, will also be included in this list.

Grandi Stazioni also operates beyond Italy's national borders: in December 2003, the company adopted a position in the Czech Republic for the upgrading and management of three major railway stations: Praha hlavní nádraží, Karlovy Vary upper station (horní nádraží) and Mariánské Lázně. In 2016 (after 13 years) Grandi Stazioni failed to deliver the contractual obligation to reconstruct the Praha hlavní nádraží and subsequently lost the lease. Grandi Stazioni decided to sue the Czech Railway Infrastructure Administration for damages without providing the paperwork proving the actual costs spent.

== Shareholders ==
Grandi Stazioni SpA is 60% controlled by Ferrovie dello Stato and 40% by Eurostazioni SpA.

== Board of directors ==
The following people serve on the board of directors as of December 2013:

- President: Mauro Moretti
- Chief Executive Officer: Fabio Battaggia
- Board Member: Massimiliano Capece Minutolo Del Sasso
- Board Member: Gaetano Casertano
- Board Member: Fabio Corsico
- Board Member: Vittorio De Silvio
- Board Member: Maurizio Marchetti
- Board Member: Francesco Rossi
- Board Member: Carlo Vergara

== See also ==
- Centostazioni
- Ferrovie dello Stato
- High-speed rail
- Rete Ferroviaria Italiana
- Trenitalia
