= Eurostazioni =

Italian investment company

Eurostazioni SpA
- Company type: Joint-stock company
- Industry: Investment
- Headquarters: Rome, Italy
- Key people: Francesco Gaetano Caltagirone, Chairman

Eurostazioni SpA. (English: Euro Stations) is a joint-stock investment company based in Rome, Italy. It owns a minority of Grandi Stazioni SpA, the company that manages and rehabilitates 13 major Italian railway stations.

The majority shareholder of Grandi Stazioni, at 60%, is Ferrovie dello Stato.

== Shareholders ==
The shareholders of Eurostazioni are:

- 32,71% Sintonia (Benetton Group)
- 32,71% Vianini Lavori (Gruppo Caltagirone)
- 32,71% Pirelli
- 1,87% SNCF

== See also ==
- Centostazioni
- High-speed rail
- Rete Ferroviaria Italiana
- Trenitalia
