= Viareggio train derailment =

2009 derailment and train fire in Italy

Viareggio derailment
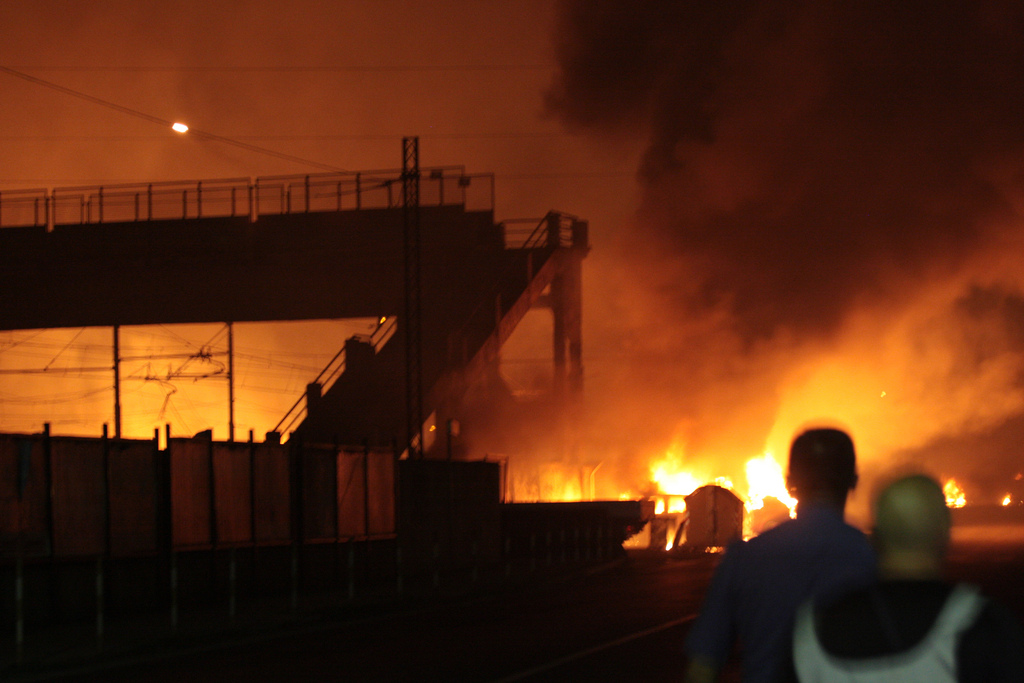

Details
- Date: 29 June 2009; 23:48 UTC+2
- Location: Viareggio railway station, Viareggio (LU)
- Coordinates: 43°52′16.21″N 10°15′23.13″E
- Country: Italy
- Line: Pisa–La Spezia–Genoa
- Operator: Ferrovie dello Stato (FS) (locomotive) / GATX (wagons)
- Incident type: Derailment
- Cause: Defective axle

Statistics
- Trains: 1
- Passengers: 0
- Deaths: 32
- Injured: 26
- Damage: Areas near railway station seriously damaged by fire

The Viareggio derailment was a derailment and subsequent fire of a freight train carrying liquefied petroleum gas. It happened on the 29th of June, 2009, in a railway station in Viareggio, Lucca, a city in Central Italy's Tuscany region. Thirty-two people were killed and a further twenty-six were injured.

== Details ==
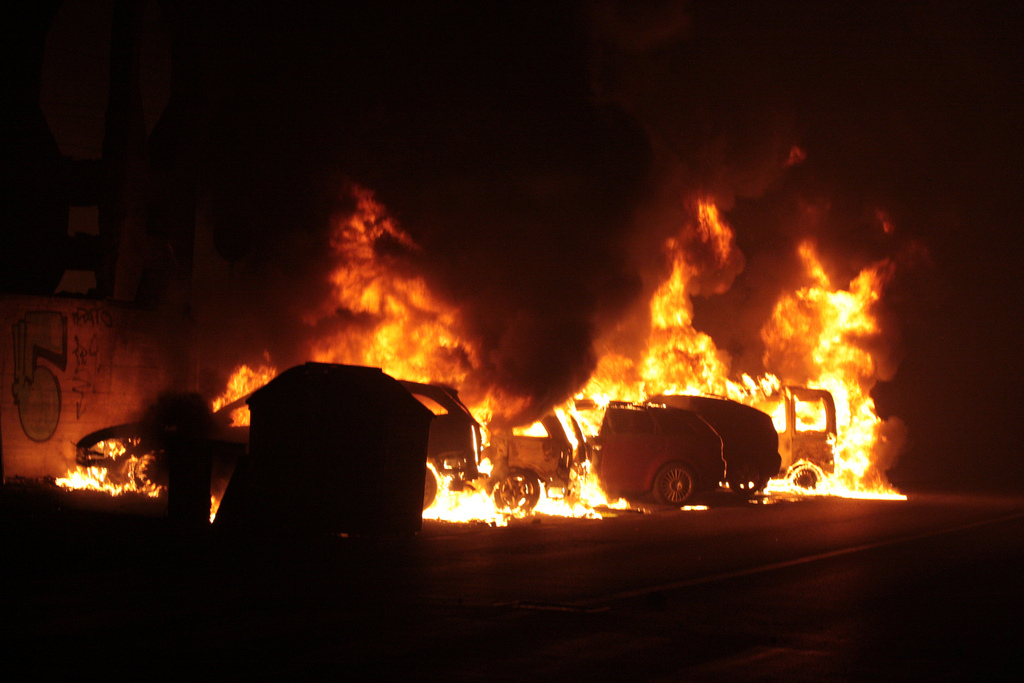
Some cars parked near the railway line burn

Freight train No. 50325 from Trecate to Gricignano-Teverola, hauled by Class E655 locomotive E 655 175 with 14 tank wagons, was derailed at Viareggio at 23:48 local time (21:48 UTC) on 29 June 2009. Of the 14 wagons, the first wagon was registered by Polskie Koleje Państwowe, the other 13 wagons by Deutsche Bahn (DB). The first DB-registered wagon, No. 338078182106, which was owned by GATX Rail Austria GmbH derailed on plain track in Viareggio station. The wagon hit the platform of the station and overturned to the left. The next four wagons also overturned and the two following were derailed but remained upright. The last seven wagons were not derailed, remaining intact on the track. The derailed wagons crashed into houses alongside the railway line.

Some of the wagons were owned by KVG Kesselwagen, a division of GATX, and leased to ExxonMobil and Erg (the owners of the oil refinery from where the train departed), were reported to have been carrying liquefied petroleum gas (LPG). Two of these exploded and caught fire. Seven people were reported to have been killed when a house collapsed. An eighth person who was killed was reported to have been riding a scooter on a road adjoining the railway. A child was found burned to death in a car in front of the house where he lived with his parents. It is speculated that his parents put him in the car to save him and then returned to the house to save the other two children.

The two members of the train crew suffered minor injuries in the accident. A large area of Viareggio was damaged in the subsequent fires caused by the ignition of wagons carrying LPG. Twenty-six people were reported to have been injured in the accident. The accident is the worst rail accident in Italy since the collision between two trains in Murazze di Vado near Bologna on 15 April 1978, which killed 48 people. An entire street was destroyed in the explosion and fire.

== Aftermath ==
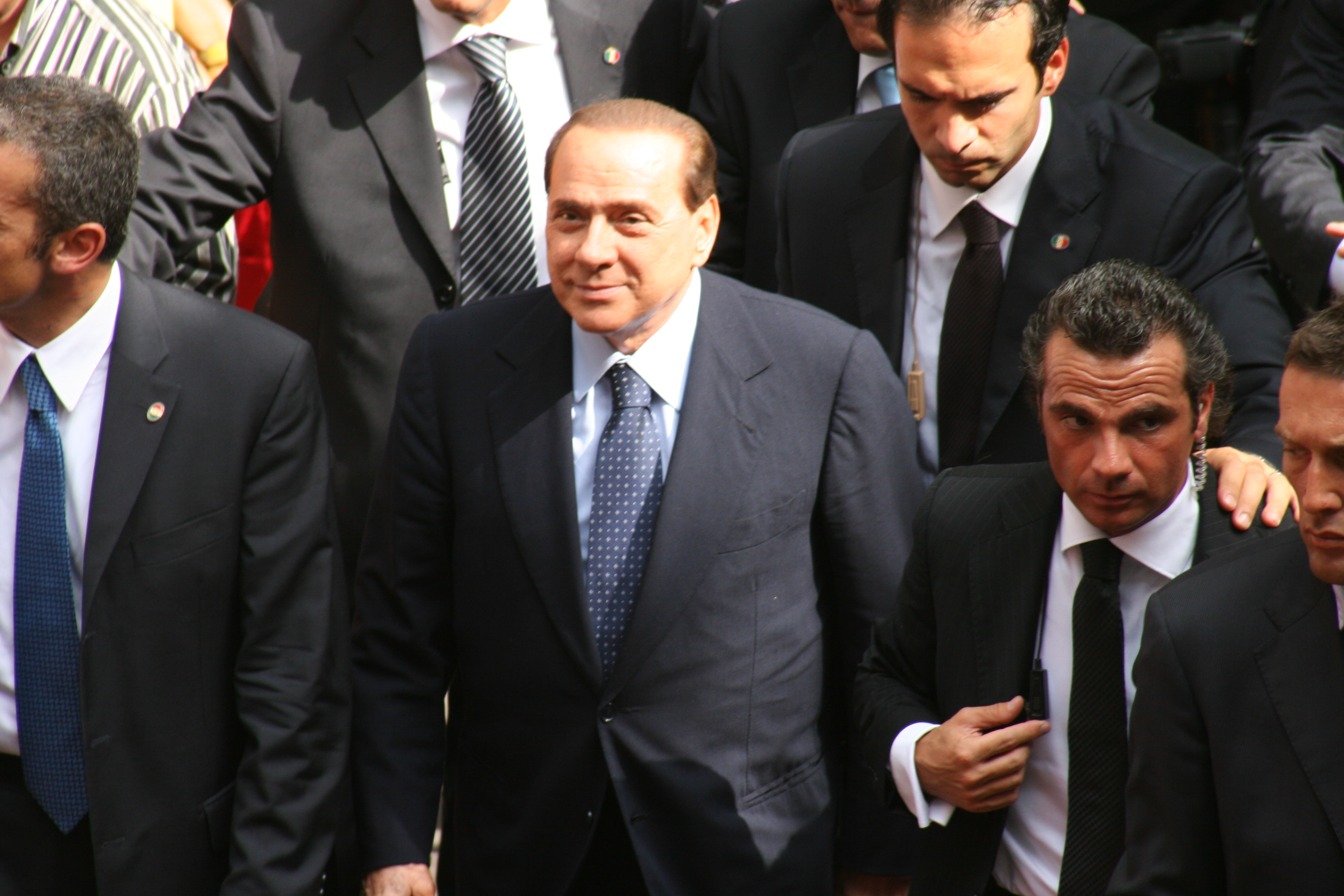
Silvio Berlusconi visits Viareggio after the train incident (2009)

A state of emergency was declared by local authorities and around 1,000 residents of Viareggio were evacuated from their homes as a result of the accident. Italian Prime Minister Silvio Berlusconi visited Viareggio "to take control of the situation," only to be met with boos and chants of "Go home." Dr. Enrico Petri, an eyewitness and local hospital physician, said that 36 people were taken to Versilia Hospital in Viareggio suffering from 80 to 90% burns. He compared the aftermath to a terrorist attack. The accident left around 100 people homeless. The accident resulted in the disruption of rail services between Rome and Genoa. Viareggio railway station was partially reopened on 3 July 2009.

== Cause ==
The Direzione Generale per le Investigazioni Ferroviarie, a section of the Italian Minister of Infrastructure and Transport opened an investigation into the cause of the accident. Italian police said that the accident may have been caused by damaged tracks or a problem with the brakes on the train. Italian union CGIL is reported to have blamed the decrepit state of the rolling stock; the maintenance of the wagon was the responsibility of GATX. The failure of an axle on the wagon that derailed is being investigated as a possible cause. Pending the official conclusions of the commissions of inquiry, the probable cause of the accident is attributable to structural failure of an axle of the carriage of the first tank wagon derailed. Italian Transport Minister Altero Matteoli informed the Italian Parliament on 1 July that a defective axle may have caused the accident.

On 29 July 2009, an Extraordinary Network Meeting of the Network of National Safety Authorities was held. It invited members to disseminate information about problems related to Type A Axles to railway operators, owners and keepers of freight wagons.

== Prosecution ==
In 2017, the Court of Lucca brought thirty-three defendants to trial in connection with the Viareggio derailment. At the conclusion of the first trial, ten defendants were acquitted, while the remaining twenty-three were convicted, including the former Rete Ferroviaria Italiana (RFI) CEOs Mauro Moretti and Michele Mario Elia. Moretti received a seven-year prison sentence for conduct occurring during his tenure as RFI's chief executive (2001–2006), although he was acquitted with respect to his later role as chief executive of Ferrovie dello Stato Italiane (FS) from 2006 to 2014, while Elia was sentenced to seven and a half years. However, the Court of Lucca imposed the highest penalties (from six to eight years) on the defendants of the companies Gatx Rail and Jungenthal, responsible for the mechanical problems that caused the accident.

The first instance ruling was partially confirmed by the Florence Court of Appeal with the ruling of 20 June 2019, which also ordered the acquittal of further positions referable to RFI and confirmed the acquittal of Ferrovie dello Stato and FS Logistics from administrative responsibility. During 2020, all the convicts filed an appeal with the Supreme Court.

With sentence of 8 January 2021, the Supreme Court confirmed the criminal responsibility for the crime of culpable railway disaster of 11 people (of which 9 belonging - at the time of the facts - to the companies responsible for maintenance activities / revision, Gatx Rail Germany, Gatx Rail Austria, Jungenthal, Cima Riparazioni; one belonging to Trenitalia and one to FS Logistica); the Court also annulled the sentence pronounced by the Court of Appeal against the positions of the former CEOs of RFI (Michele Mario Elia and Mauro Moretti, the latter also former CEO of Ferrovie dello Stato) and 3 other people, deferring all to a new appeal judgment. Following, the Supreme Court judgment, all the companies originally blamed for administrative liability were definitively acquitted.

== See also ==
- Lac-Mégantic rail disaster – a 2013 derailment of crude oil train and subsequent fire and explosions in the core of a Canadian town with 42 killed and another 5 presumed dead.
- Nishapur train disaster – a 2004 derailment of a runaway fuel and flammable goods train in Iran, the resulting fire and explosion killed around 300 people.
- Soham rail disaster – a 1944 fire and subsequent explosion of an ammunition train near Soham, England.
- Expansion ratio
- Moby Prince disaster
