= Renato Mazzoncini =

Italian businessman

- Born: 1968 (age 56–57); Brescia, Italy
- Education: MSc in Electrical Engineering, Polytechnic University of Milan (1992)
- Occupation: Businessman
- Known for: CEO and leader in public transport companies
- Children: 3

Renato Mazzoncini is an Italian businessman who had a career as leader of public transport businesses. He is the CEO and the Managing Director of Italian energy company A2A.

== Early life and education ==
Mazzoncini was born in 1968 in Brescia, Italy. In 1992, he graduated with a Master of Science in Electrical Engineering from the Polytechnic University of Milan. He is married and has three children.

== Career ==
=== Public transport ===
Between 1995 and 2000, he was a member of a project team set up by Ansaldo Trasporti to build Copenhagen's automatic metro.

In the mid-1990s, when Mazzoncini was 26, a gas leak caused the apartment complex where he lived to explode. As a spokesperson for the complex, he arranged to have the apartments demolished and rebuilt. The owner of the construction company in charge of the project also owned Autoguidovie, a public transport company specialising in road transport. After their contact due to the gas leak, he was offered a job as team leader. In 1998, he became director of the same company.

While he directed Autoguidovie, the company acquired holdings in various public transport companies owned by local authorities. Among these was the Reggio Emilia Public Transport Authority, whose mayor at the time was Graziano Delrio, Italy's Minister of Infrastructure and Transport.

In 2012, Ferrovie dello Stato Italiane S.p.A introduced a new company called Busitalia, which aimed to expand the group's role in the public road transport sector. Mauro Moretti, at the time CEO of the group, asked Mazzoncini to head this new holding. He accepted, at the condition that he would be CEO and Director-general of every new company held by Busitalia. The first acquisition he made while at Busitalia was Azienda Trasporti Area Fiorentina, the public transport network operator in Florence. While restructuring ATAF, he met Matteo Renzi, who at the time was mayor of Florence and would go on to become Prime Minister. Their partnership reportedly started with a quarrel: a raise in the prices of bus tickets prompted a very heated reaction from an infuriated Renzi, who phoned Mazzoncini while he was skiing in Northern Italy. After meeting in person, the two reportedly got along much better.

In 2014, Busitalia and Autoguidovie formed a joint venture, giving rise to the biggest local public transport player in the country.

=== Government positions ===
In 2015, he became CEO of Ferrovie dello Stato Italiane S.p.A, replacing Moretti. He stated that Renzi and Delrio, at the time respectively Prime Minister and Minister of Infrastructures and Transports, offered him the role because both of them had previously experienced first-hand his abilities as CEO.

In 2016, Ferrovie dello Stato Italiane approved a new Industrial Plan for the 2017-2026 period, which includes €94 billion in investments in investments and aims to develop both the regional rail transport and freight transport sectors.

He was elected Chairman of the International Union of Railways (UIC) on December 1, 2016.

In 2017, the holding launched a new company called Mercitalia, which aimed to unify the previously fragmented presence in railways.

=== Later career ===
He was appointed as a Professor in Mobility: Infrastructure and Services at the Polytechnic University of Milan.

In 2018, Mazzoncini was elected as CEO and COO of Ferrovie dello Stato Italiane S.p.A.

On 25 July 2018, Renato Mazzoncini stepped down from his roles in Ferrovie dello Stato Italiane S.p.A, accusing the government of operating a "spoils system" after the new Transport Minister, Danilo Toninelli, dismissed the entire board of the company.

On 13 May 2020, Mazzoncini became CEO and Managing Director of Italian energy business A2A
