= Giulio Minoletti =

Italian architect and designer (1910–1981)

- Born: 19 April 1910; Milan, Kingdom of Italy
- Died: 14 January 1981 (aged 70); Milan, Italy
- Education: Polytechnic University of Milan
- Occupations: Architect, urban planner, designer

Giulio Minoletti (19 April 1910 – 14 January 1981) was an Italian architect, urban planner and industrial designer. A leading figure of Italian Rationalism and post-war Modernism, he worked on architecture, urban planning, transport design and industrial design, particularly in Milan.

== Career ==
After graduating from the Polytechnic University of Milan in 1931, Minoletti taught architecture at his alma mater and became active in the Movimento di Studi per l'Architettura (MSA), serving as its president from 1953 to 1955. He contributed to the post-war reconstruction of Milan and designed residential buildings, urban plans and transport interiors, including the interiors of the ETR 300 Settebello, the ETR 250 Arlecchino, and the ocean liners SS Andrea Doria and SS Cristoforo Colombo. Among his architectural works are the Palazzo di Fuoco in Milan, the Pirelli workers' canteen at Bicocca, the INA-Casa housing developments at QT8 and Vialba, and the Porta Garibaldi station project.
