= E632 =

E632 may refer to:

- FS Class E632, a class of Italian railways electric locomotives
- The E number for dipotassium inosinate
