= Class 444 =

Class 444 may refer to:

- British Rail Class 444
- FS Class E.444
