= Mercitalia =

Italian freight rail transport company

Mercitalia Rail

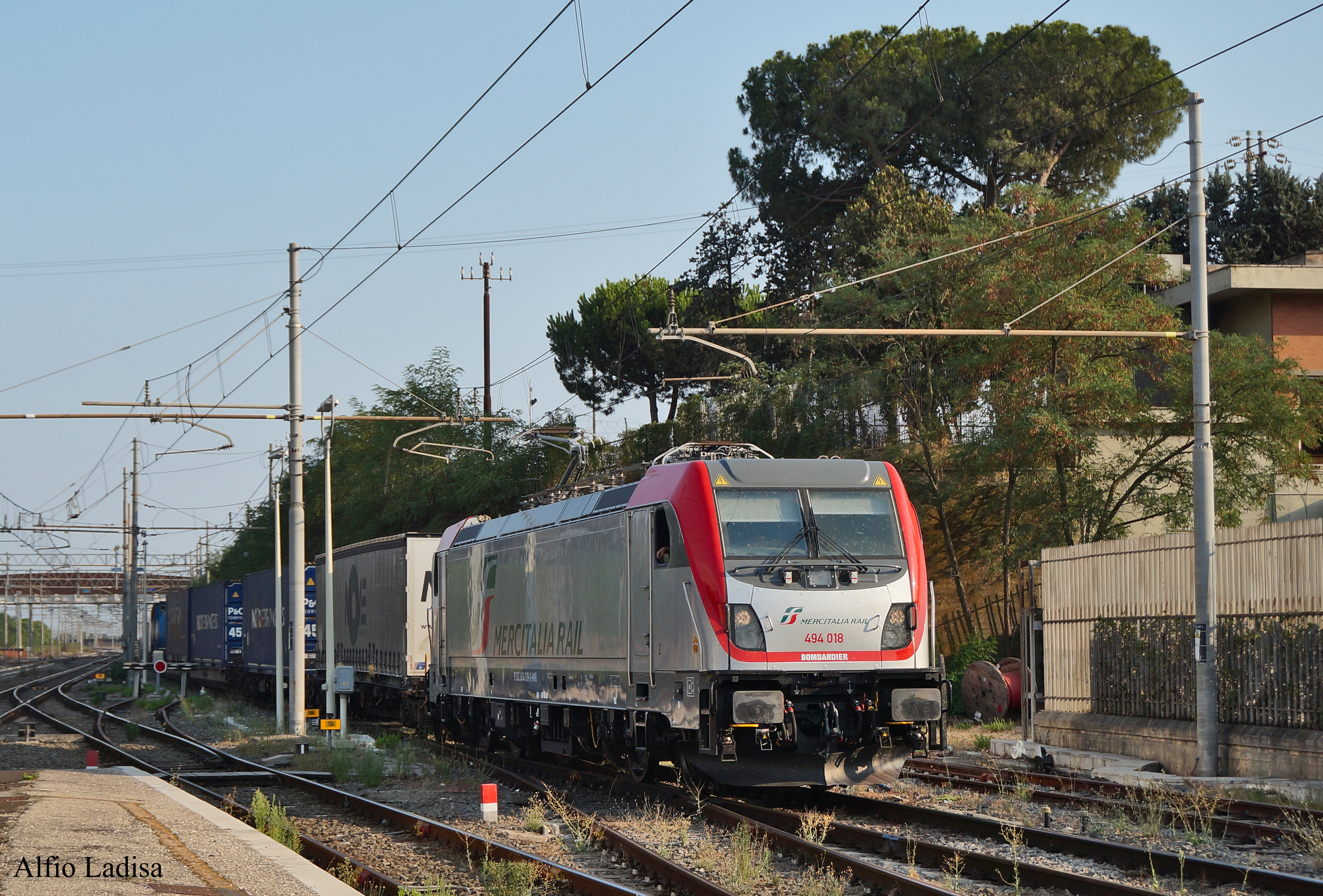
- E494.018 TRAXX DC3 Locomotive, owned by Mercitalia Rail, hauls a freight train in Pomezia
- Type: State-owned subsidiary
- Industry: Rail transport
- Founded: 2017
- Headquarters: Rome, Italy
- Key people: Flavio Nogara (Chairperson); Maria Annunziata Giaconia (CEO)
- Products: Transport
- Owner: Ferrovie dello Stato Italiane
- Website: www.mercitaliarail.it

Mercitalia (also known as Mercitalia Rail) is a wholly owned subsidiary of the Italian state railway (FSI) system that operates freight transport and logistics services both within Italy and across Europe.

It was founded in early 2016 as a major element of the FSI's reorganisation of the Italian railway system to more efficiently operate freight services. Early on, ambitious investment programmes for the acquisition of large numbers of new locomotives and rolling stock were launched; this new fleet would facilitate the ultimate goal of pursuing international freight services and other logistical opportunities across the European Union. On 7 November 2018, the Mercitalia Fast high speed freight service was launched; it offered a travel time of roughly three hours and 30 minutes at an average speed of around 110 mph using a specially modified FS Class ETR 500 trainset for nighttime freight movements between the southern and northern regions of Italy. However, due to challenging conditions, the final Mercitalia Fast service was conducted on 18 November 2022.

In addition to traditional rail freight services, Mercitalia operates multiple concessions and subsidiaries, such as the Polish rail freight transport company POL-Rail. It is also exploring the use of digital sensor technology to enhance its operations, the potential use of bi-mode traction, and expanding its intermodal traffic between maritime and rail mediums. The company has also advocated for infrastructure operators to take greater action to better accommodate and improve working conditions for freight services.

== History ==
Mercitalia was founded by the Italian state railway (FSI) in January 2016 through the reorganisation and merger of several existing entities, the principal of these being the freight operations of Trenitalia, along with various supporting services, including logistics and freight terminals. Through the creation of Mercitalia it was hoped to increase efficiency by minimising the duplication of activities; the combined entity had an initial headcount of roughly 4,000 employees and was organised into three divisions: Mercitalia Rail, Mercitalia Logistics and Mercitalia Terminal. One month later, FSI announced further details on the newly created organisation; in addition to the Mercitalia branded services, it controls European rail operator TX Logistik, intermodal operator Cemat, Terminal AlpTransit, and TLF. FSI officials stated that Mercitalia would expand state-owned freight operations from the primarily domestic Trenitalia Cargo towards cross-border European services; this move had the intent of doubling freight revenue within ten years and more than tripling rail's share of the Italian freight market within fifteen years.

During February 2017, FSI announced its long-term investment plans for Mercitalia, under which roughly €1.5 billion would be provided across its first decade of operation; this capital injection was to be largely allocated towards the procurement of new locomotives and rolling stock. Accordingly, in November 2017, it was revealed that Mercitalia had placed a large order for up to 125 Bombardier TRAXX electric locomotives at a cost of €400 million; additional orders included 50 intermodal wagons from Tatravagonka Poprad and 200 steel freight cars from Greenbrier which had a combined value of €27 million. By December 2018, the company's fleet reportedly comprised 470 locomotives, 340 of which were electric while 130 were diesel powered.

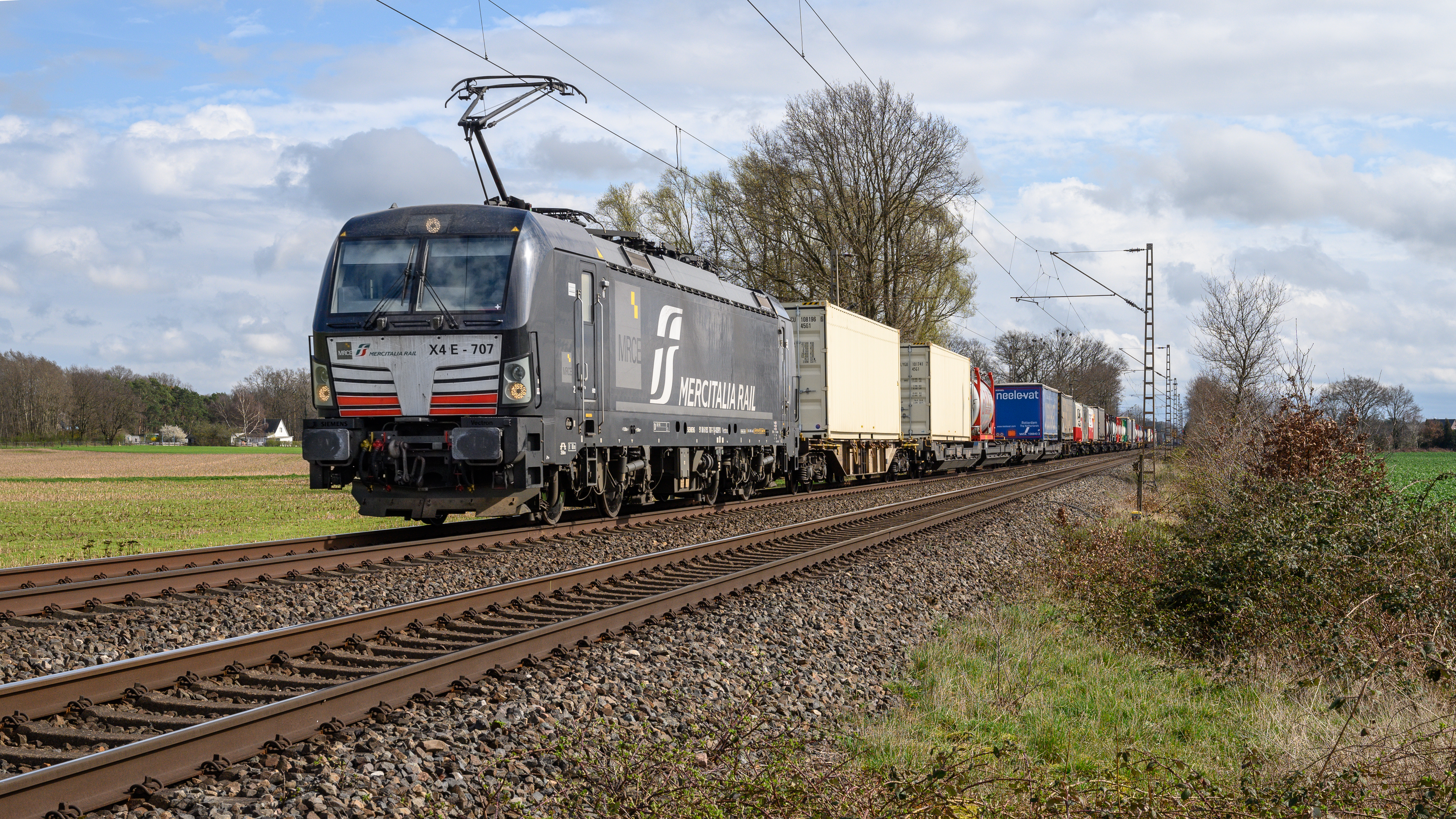
Mercitalia Rail leased Vectron

Since its creation, Mercitalia has been responsible for the operation of rail freight transport in the Port of Savona, outside Genoa, via a ten-year concession set to expire in 2026. Since its creation, the company has obtained further concessions to operate port railways, often in partnership with other logistics companies. The company has also been involved in the construction of new rail freight instrastucture, such as a new intermodal shunting yard and terminal in Milan.

On 7 November 2018, the first of the Mercitalia Fast high speed freight services was conducted; it was operated via a partnership between Mercitalia and TX Logistik. It was stated to be targeted at the requirements of express courier and logistics operators that seek time-sensitive distribution mediums. The Mercitalia Fast service connected various locations around southern Italy with the northern Italian city of Bologna, one of the country's most important logistics hubs; it ran upon the pre-existing Italian high speed railway network that had been primarily developed for fast passenger services while the rolling stock comprised a specially modified FS Class ETR 500 trainset. These services were run at nighttime as to minimise any impact upon the regular high speed passenger services; the journey time was roughly three hours and 30 minutes at an average speed of around 110 mph. However, in 2022, it was decided to discontinue the Mercitalia Fast service; the final train under the model departed Mercitalia's Marcianise terminal, near Naples, on 18 November 2022.

In December 2018, it was announced that Mercitalia had acquired a 50 percent stage in POL-Rail, a Polish rail freight transport company that specialised in services between Italy and Central and Eastern Europe, from the Polish State Railways (PKP); the deal, which also involved the acquisition of its smaller subsidiary Rom Rail, was framed by Mercitalia Logistics's managing director, Marco Gosso, as a key move in the development in extending the company's control over the value chain of logistics services and strengthen its presence on the traffic axis between Italy and Eastern Europe which offers substantial development prospects. In July 2019, the company spoke out against the inaction of various infrastructure management officials, stating that action was necessary to making rail-based freight more successful and enable some routes to be conducted at all. In November 2020, a new international freight service between the Italian city of Trieste and the German city of Nuremberg.

In November 2022, it was announced that Mercitalia intended to order an additional 400 locomotives, comprising both electric and bi-mode traction, along with 3,600 next-generation freight wagons as a part of its ongoing fleet renewal strategy. That same year, a project to retrofit 40 of Mercitalia's existing TRAXX locomotives with European Train Control System (ETCS) apparatus. A separate pilot project to outfit wagons with various smart sensors to facilitate automatic braking was also underway. Furthermore, the international shipping line Mediterranean Shipping Company and FSI were reportedly in the process of setting up a join project to expand intermodal transport between the maritime and railway mediums with the goal of expanding traffic and efficiency.

== Fleet ==
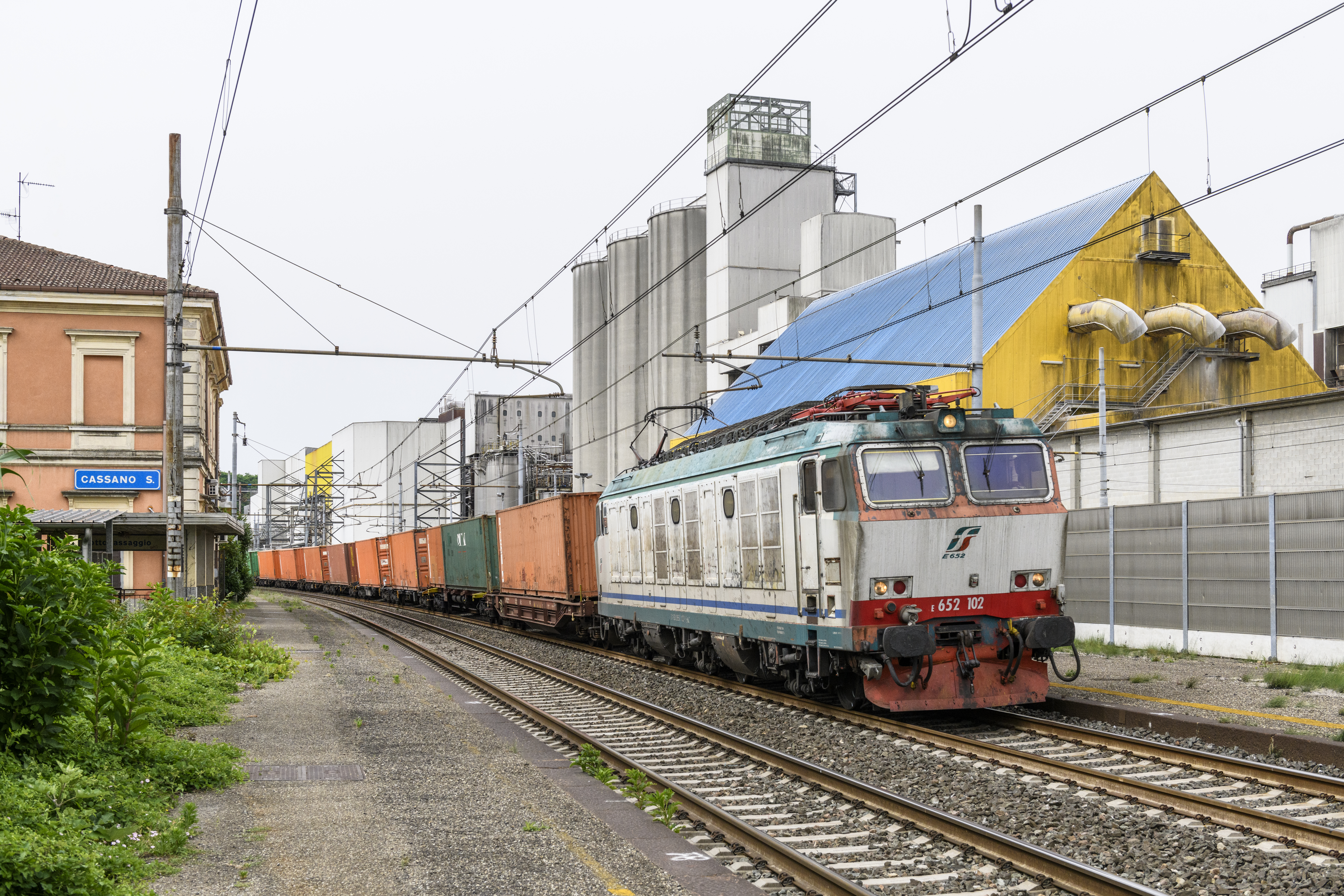
E.652

Electrical locomotives:

- E.652
- E.405
- E.412
- E.483
- E.193
- E.494

Diesel locomotives:

- D.445

Shunting locomotives:

- 245
- D.145
- 214
