= Mazzoncini =

Mazzoncini is a surname. Notable people with the surname include:

- Alberto Mazzoncini (born 1991), South African cricketer
- David Mazzoncini (born 1971), French footballer
- Renato Mazzoncini (born 1968), CEO and COO of Italian Railway holding company Ferrovie dello Stato Italiane Spa
