= A2A =

Italian utilities company

A2A S.p.A.

- A2A headquarters in Milan
- Type: Società per Azioni
- Traded as: BIT: A2A; FTSE MIB Component
- Industry: Utilities
- Founded: 1 January 2008
- Headquarters: Brescia, Italy
- Key people: Roberto Tasca (Chairman), Renato Mazzoncini (CEO and Managing Director)
- Services: Gas and electricity distribution, water distribution and treatment, waste management
- Revenue: €14,063 million (2025)
- Operating income: €1,235 million (2025)
- Net income: €750 million (2025)
- Total assets: €21,383 million (2025)
- Total equity: €5,917 million (2025)
- Number of employees: 14,879 (2025)
- Website: www.gruppoa2a.it/en

A2A S.p.A. (branded as A2A Life Company) is an Italian company, organised as a società per azioni, that generates, distributes, and markets renewable energy, electricity, gas, integrated water supply, and waste management services. The company has significant presence in the North of Italy, energy production facilities in Italy and Greece.

== Company history ==
A2A was formed on 1 January 2008 by the merging of three Northern Italian municipality-owned utilities. They include Azienda Elettrica Municipale (AEM, est. 1880) and Azienda Milanese Servizi Ambientali (AMSA, est. 1907), both of Milan, and Azienda dei Servizi Municipalizzati (ASM, est. 1908) of Brescia.

As of December 2024, it remains partially owned by the Municipalities of Milan and Brescia (25% ownership each). The municipalities are responsible of appointing 12 out of its 15 directors. A2A is listed on the Borsa Italiana and is a member of the FTSE MIB index.
