= Michele Mario Elia =

Italian executive

- Born: Michele Mario Elia
- Occupation: CEO of Ferrovie dello Stato Italiane

Michele Mario Elia is an Italian manager and CEO of Ferrovie dello Stato Italiane Spa from 2014 to 2015.

== Life and career ==
He was born at Castellana Grotte on 5 October 1946 and he graduated on 1972. He taught "Misure Elettriche" in 1970s and then he was hired in Ferrovie dello Stato on 1975 as inspector. Since 1975 to 1980 he made communication systems at Cagliari railway station. Since 1980 to 1986 he made train powerplants at Bari railway station. Since 1986 to 2015 he was electric powerplant supervisor, production chief at Bari railway station, general supervisor mantenaince services and Rete Ferroviaria Italiana general supervisor.

=== Legal problems ===
He had been under investigation for an accident that caused the death of 32 people on 29 June 2009.

On 8 January 2021, the Supreme Court of Cassation annulled Moretti's 2019 sentence, as the statute of limitations for a manslaughter conviction had expired. The case was remanded to the appeals court of Florence.
