= FS Class 214 =

FS 214
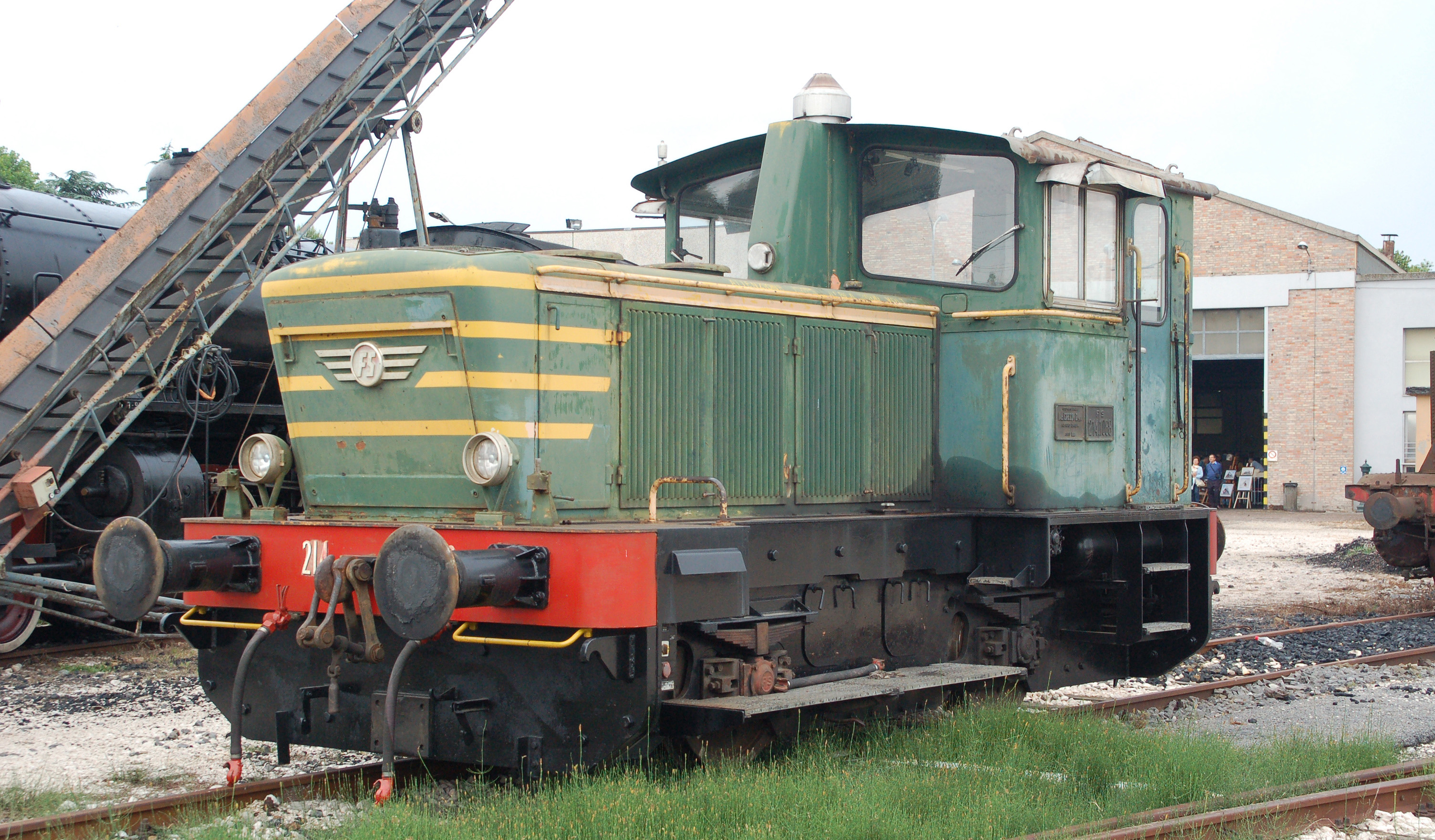
- FS 214 1068 at Rimini depot 2008-06-07
Type and origin
- Power type: Diesel
- Builder: CNR; Aerosicula; ABL; Greco
- Build date: 1964-1986
- Total produced: 214.1000: 156; 214.4000: 314; 214.7000: 20
Specifications
- Configuration
  - AAR: 0-4-0DH
  - UIC: B
- Gauge: 1,435 mm (4 ft 8 1/2 in)
- Wheel diameter: 910 mm (36 in)
- Length
  - Over couplers: 6,958–7,168 mm (22.828–23.517 ft)
- Loco weight: 21–22 tonnes (21–22 long tons; 23–24 short tons)
- Prime mover: 214.1000 Fiat 8217; 214.4000 VM 1308; 214.7000 Deutz A8L 714
- Transmission: Hydraulic Voith L 33 U
- MU working: None
- Train heating: None
- Train brakes: Air
Performance figures
- Maximum speed: 35 km/h (22 mph)
- Power output: 67–75 kW (90–101 hp)
Career
- Operators: FS
- Numbers: 214.1001-214.1156; 214.4001-214.4318; 214.7001-214.7020
- Delivered: 214.1000 1970-1979; 214.4000 1979-1988; 214.7000 1964-1965

FS Class 214 are small shunting locomotives that are used all across Italy. They were built by a range of manufacturers over a long period. The ALn 668 series of DMUs use the same Fiat engines as the 214.1000 series locomotives.
