= FS Class E.444 =

Italian electric locomotive class

FS class E.444
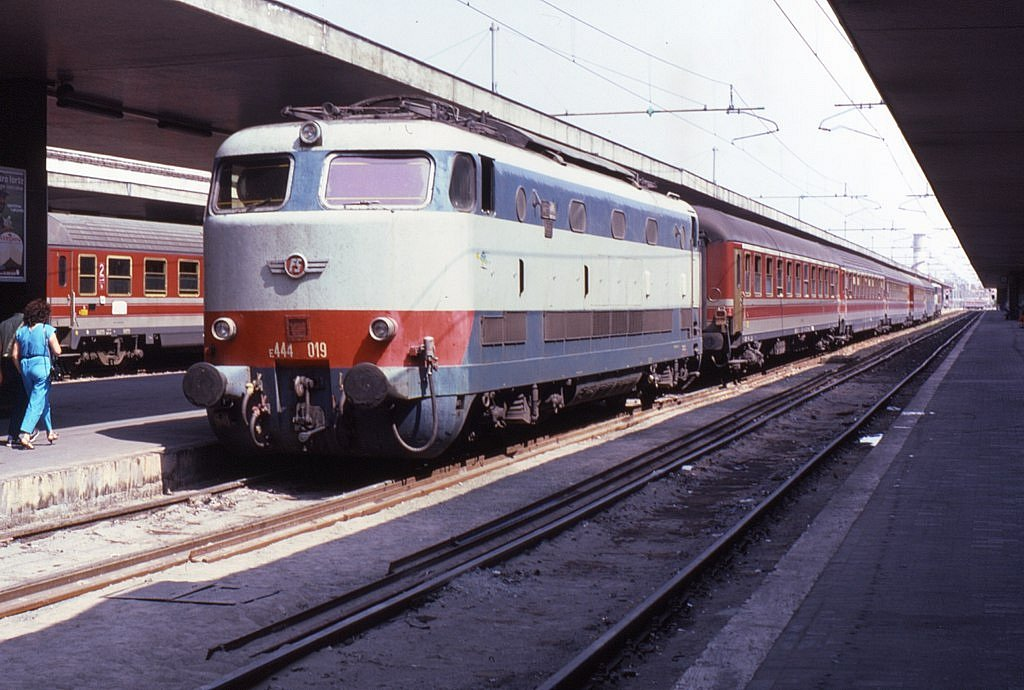
- An E.444 in Roma Termini station in 1995
Type and origin
- Power type: Electric
- Build date: 1965–1975
Specifications
- Configuration
  - UIC: Bo′Bo′
- Gauge: 1,435 mm (4 ft 8 1/2 in) standard gauge
- Wheel diameter: 1.250 m (49.21 in)
- Wheelbase: 9.000 m (29 ft 6 3/8 in) between bogies 3.020 m (9 ft 10 7/8 in) between axles on each bogie
- Length: 16.840 m (55 ft 3 in)
- Width: 3.020 m (9 ft 10 7/8 in)
- Height: 4.300 m (14 ft 1 1/4 in)
- Loco weight: 83 t (82 long tons; 91 short tons)
- Electric system/s: 3,000 V DC Catenary
- Current pickup: Pantograph
- Traction motors: DC series
- Transmission: 41/77 gear ratio
- Safety systems: RSC4; SCMT
Performance figures
- Maximum speed: 200 km/h (120 mph)
- Power output: 4,272 kW (5,729 hp)
- Tractive effort: 201 kN (45,000 lb_{f})
Career
- Operators: FS Trenitalia
- Number in class: 117 (Note: Including four prototypes, 110 series and three experimental units.)
- Nicknames: "Tartaruga" (Tortoise)
- First run: 1967
- Disposition: updated as E.444R (Note: For a total of 97 units as of 2007. The first prototype is preserved to the original standard.)

The FS E.444 is a class of Italian railways electric locomotives. They were introduced in the course of the 1960s until 1975. Starting from 1989, all E.444s were upgraded as E.444R.

The locomotives are nicknamed Tartaruga (tortoise). The original E.444 class carried a cabside cartoon of a speeding tortoise.

== History ==
=== E.444 standard ===
The E.444 locomotive was designed in the 1960s as the first Italian electric locomotive capable to reach 200 km/h (120 mph) (in that period first high-speed trains like the Japanese Shinkansen and the French TGV were appearing). Italian railways could boast fast trains like the ETR 200, but they were getting old and the Pendolino project was just in its early phases.

The first four prototypes, built at Savigliano, made their debut in 1967–1968: their power output 3,000 kW (4,000 hp) was respectable for the time, but they proved unable to hold the fast international services required for the new locomotive, and the bogies were limited to 180 km/h (110 mph). They proved anyway that Italian industry could produce locomotive capable of more than 200 km/h (120 mph) (Note: A speed of 207 km/h (129 mph)) was registered on November 8, 1967, in the maiden trip Rome–Milan.

The series production saw the introduction of the more powerful T750 motors, which boosted the power to 4,200 kW (5,600 hp), while the bogies were upgraded for 200 km/h (120 mph). The frontal part was improved and made more aerodynamic. A characteristic livery with two blue stripes on a pale grey background was adopted. The first 50 units proved successful, and the Ferrovie dello Stato (FS) ordered 60 more to be built starting from 1972. 16 units were adapted for feeding at 1.5 kV DC. During 1974 two locomotives (units 056 and 057) were provided with a "shunt chopper" system (later the modifications applied were rolled back, making the two units identical to standard once again), while in 1975 the E.444.005 adopted a "full chopper" electronic system, which was later also adopted on the E.632/633 classes, and which granted a 5,000 kW (6,700 hp) peak power.

Curiously, the fact that the E.444s were often used on old lines and coupled to not advanced coaches, usually hampered their performances. For example, only with the adoption of second-generation coaches, like the Grand Comfort type, trains driven by E.444 could replace the old ETR 300 in the Milan–Rome fast service.

FS class E.444R
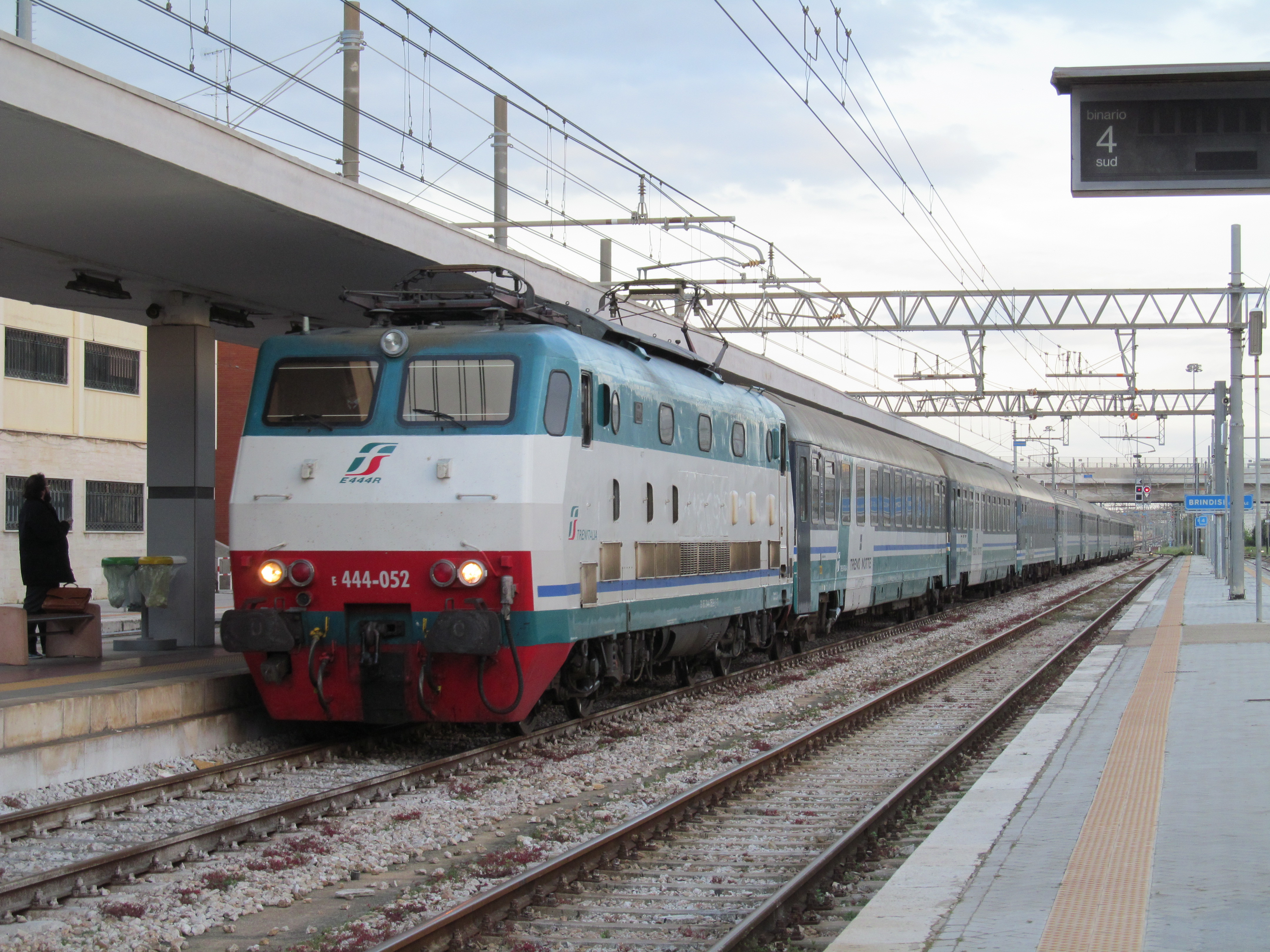
- An E.444R at Brindisi Station.
Type and origin
- Power type: Electric
- Build date: 1989–
Specifications
- Configuration
  - UIC: Bo′Bo′
- Wheel diameter: 1.250 m (49.21 in)
- Wheelbase: 9.000 m (29 ft 6.3 in) between bogie pivots 3.020 m (9 ft 10.9 in) between axles on each bogie
- Length: 17.120 m (56 ft 2.0 in)
- Width: 3.020 m (9 ft 10.9 in)
- Height: 4.300 m (14 ft 1.3 in)
- Loco weight: 84 t (83 long tons; 93 short tons)
- Electric system/s: 3,000 V DC Catenary
- Current pickup: Pantograph
- Traction motors: DC series
- Transmission: 42/75 gear ratio
Performance figures
- Maximum speed: 200 km/h (120 mph)
- Power output: 4,272 kW (5,729 hp)
- Tractive effort: 201 kN (45,000 lb_{f})
Career
- Operators: FS Trenitalia
- Number in class: 97
- First run: 1989
- Disposition: In service

=== E.444R ===
The introduction of fast lines showed the age of the E.444. A program was therefore commissioned to upgrade all units to a new standard. The stator groups and the braking system were adapted for high speed service, while later it was also decided to update the driving cabin, which had been always noisy at high speed. A newly profiled frontal was thus adopted, together with a pearl grey-red livery, later changed to the standard white green of FS Trenitalia. The modified units (a total of 97) were re-christened E.444R ("R" standing for riqualificazione, meaning "re-qualification", but also known as "Ribollita" derisively among personnel, meaning "Reheated soup").

E.444R are in widespread service with FS-Trenitalia for fast Intercity and express services.

As part of Trenitalia's plan to retire older types of locomotives (such as the Caimano, Tigre and Tartaruga), the E.444Rs are now undergoing final retirement due to lack of newer safety features. By June 2020, they are no longer used in revenue services, instead being used to tow rolling stock for scrap or work trains.
