= Settebello (train) =

Former high-speed rail service

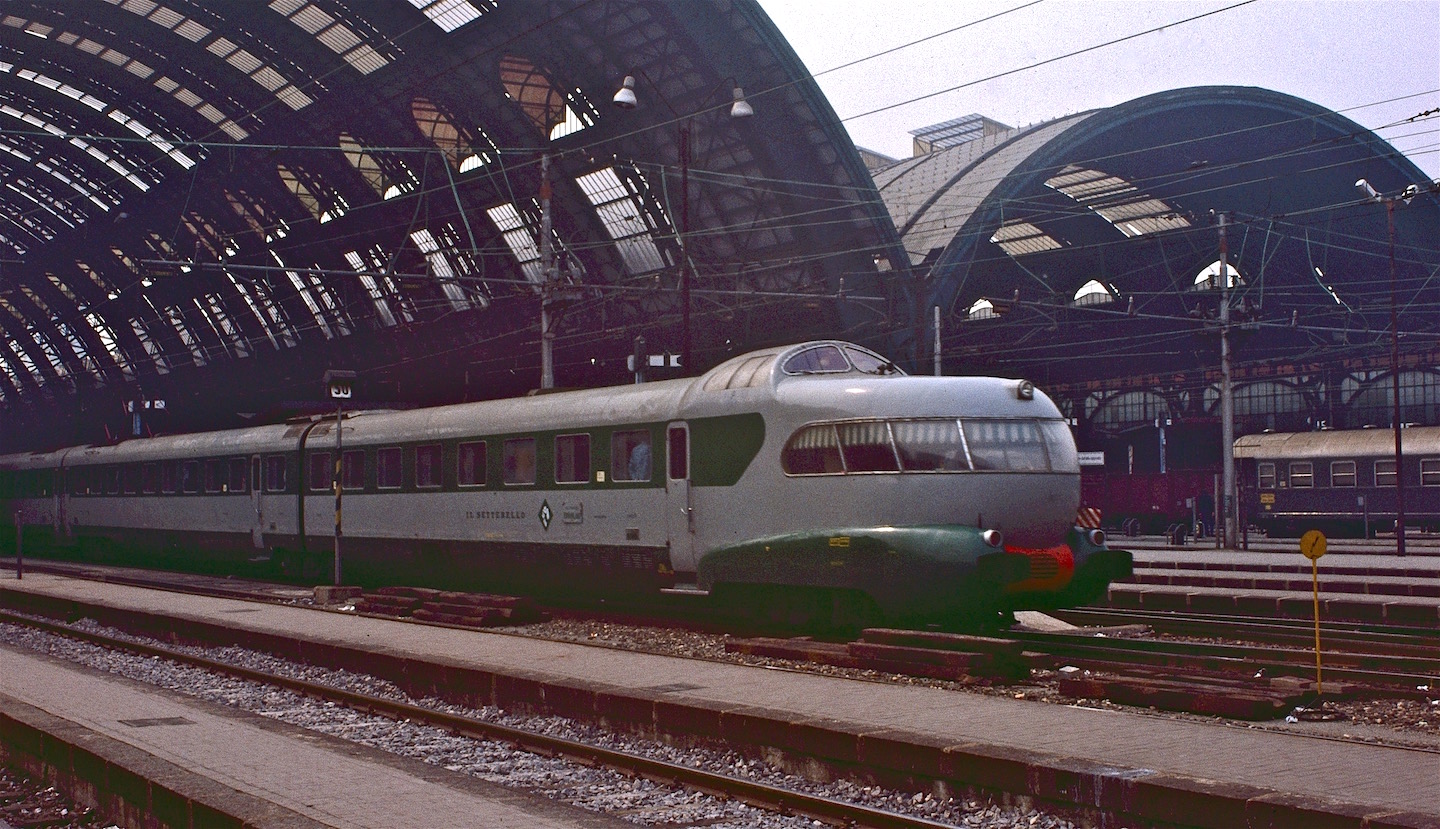
- The TEE Settebello at Milano Centrale in 1983

Overview
- Service type: Rapido (1953–74); Trans Europ Express (TEE) (1974–84)
- Status: Discontinued
- Locale: Italy
- First service: 1953
- Last service: 2 June 1984
- Successor: TEE Colosseum
- Former operator: Ferrovie dello Stato (FS)

Route
- Termini: Milano Centrale; Roma Termini
- Distance travelled: 630 km (390 mi)
- Service frequency: Daily

On-board services
- Class(es): First class only
- Catering facilities: Restaurant car, operated by Wagons-Lits
- Observation facilities: Lounges at front and rear

Technical
- Rolling stock: ETR 300-type EMU trainsets
- Track gauge: 1,435 mm (4 ft 8 1/2 in)
- Electrification: 3,000 V DC

The Settebello was a famous Italian high-speed express train that linked Milano Centrale in Milan with Roma Termini station in Rome, via Bologna and Florence. Introduced in 1953, it was operated by the Italian State Railways (FS) and used the distinctive ETR 300-type electric multiple unit trainsets, featuring observation lounges at the front and rear of the train. When introduced, it "set a standard of speed and luxurious travelling accommodation previously unknown in Italy [and] rivalling anything else on European rails." It was a Trans Europ Express (TEE) from 1974 until its withdrawal, in 1984.

== History ==
Introduced in 1953, the Settebello (Italian: Il Settebello) provided high-speed luxury train service between Milan and Rome. Its name, which translates as "the beautiful seven" (or alternatively and more loosely as "the lucky seven"), refers to the Italian card game Scopone, in which the seven-of-diamonds card carries the highest value. A drawing of nine playing cards, with the seven of diamonds shown larger than the others, was painted on the side of the train next to its name.

For its entire history Il Settebello was operated by electric multiple-unit trainsets of type ETR 300, and these sets consequently came to be known as "Settebello" type, as they were used exclusively on the Settebello during its period of operation. These trainsets featured rounded ends with passenger observation lounges, allowing passengers to sit at the very front and rear of the train. The operator's cab – or "command cabin" – was in a raised area behind and above the lounge compartment. The design made the train distinct from all other trains in Italy and all other high-speed trains of the time. Reservations were required for travel on the Settebello, but the seating in the observation areas was unreserved, allowing any passenger on the train to use it.

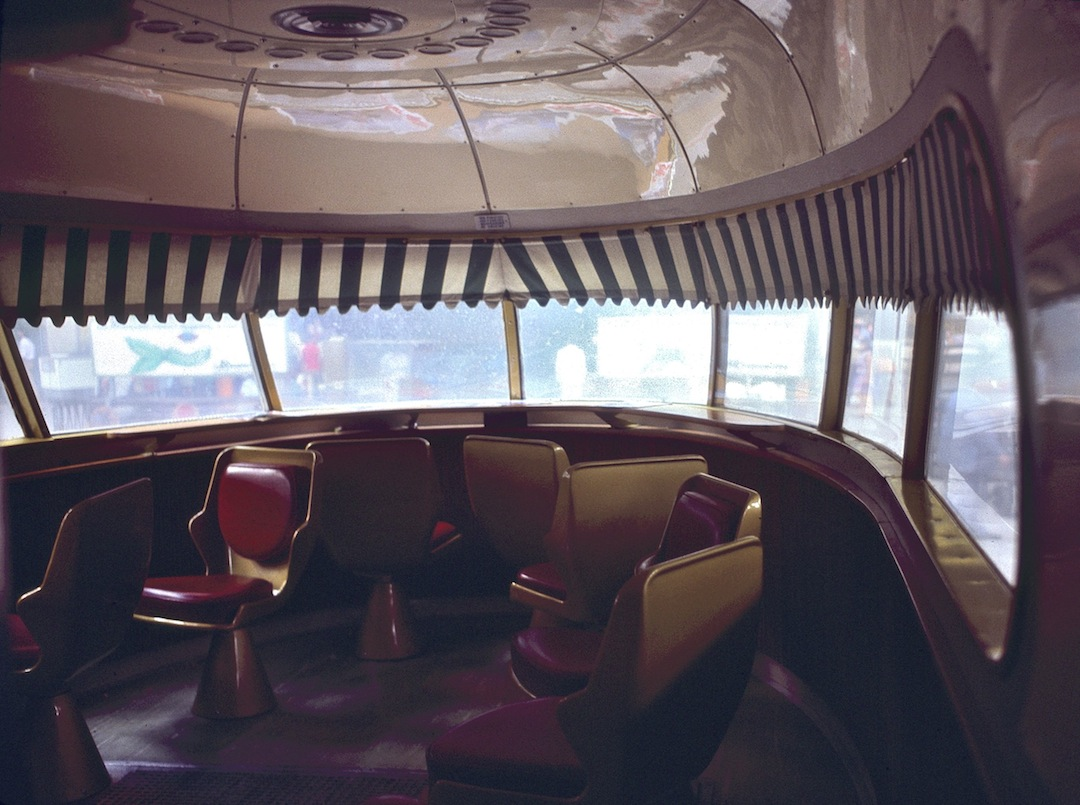
Interior of lounge at front of Settebello train, in 1983

The Settebello was originally a Rapido-class service of FS, and from the start it carried first-class coaches only. The seven-car train included a full restaurant car, operated by the Wagons-Lits Company. All cars were air-conditioned. In addition to the regular first-class ticket price, the cost of travelling on the luxury train Settebello carried an extra surcharge, or fare supplement. The surcharge alone was almost as much as the first-class fare, but afforded passengers a service "comparable to that of a five-star hotel", with amenities found on very few other day-journey trains of the time. These included an office where a traveller could "make a telephone call to anywhere in Italy" and the availability of shower facilities in the restrooms.

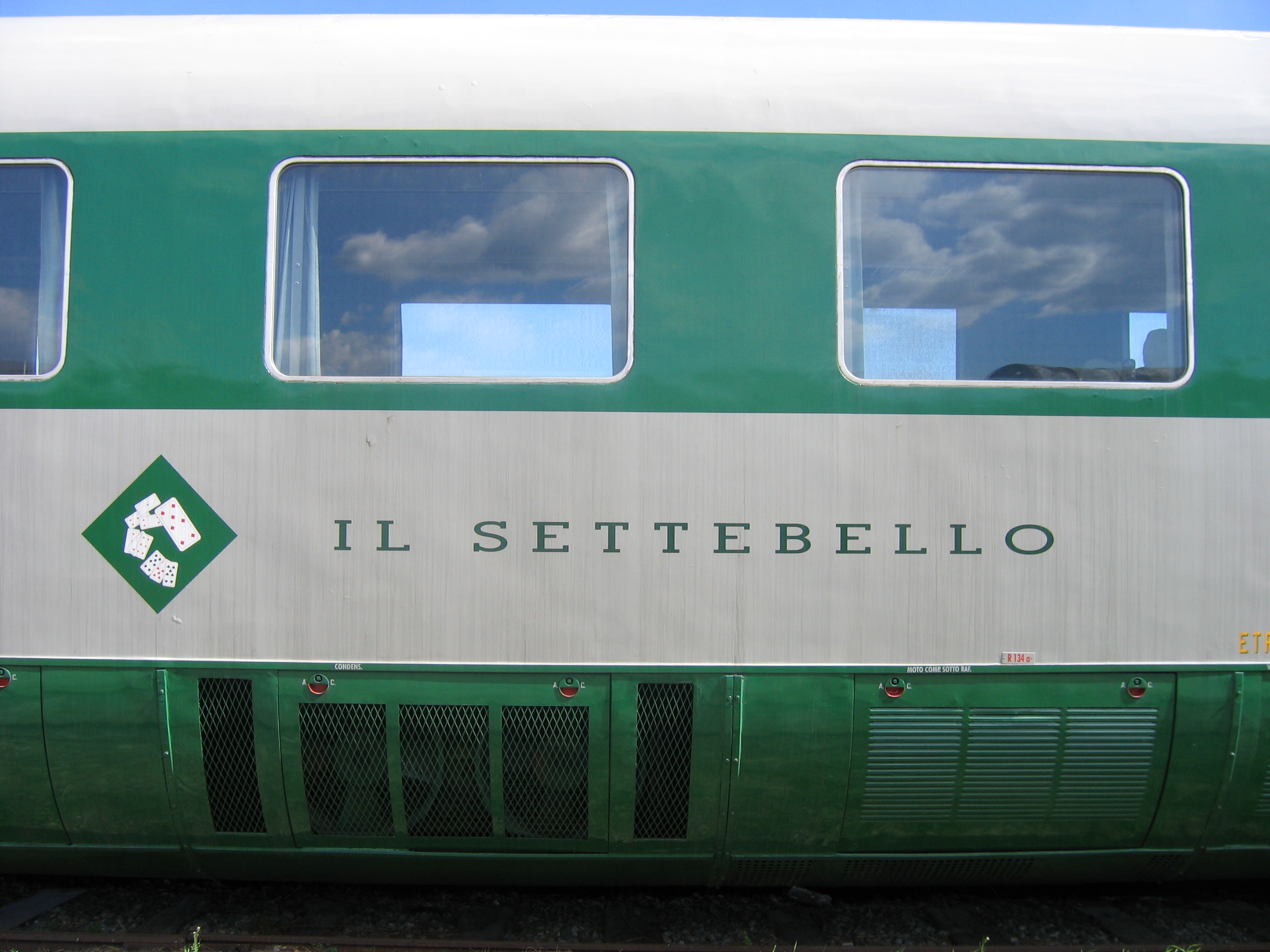
Name and "Settebello" card game logo on side of train

The train became a Trans Europ Express (TEE) service on 26 May 1974. It was TEE number 69 southbound and 68 northbound, and in both directions it was the morning TEE serving the Milan–Rome route, which had three TEE trains per day in each direction. During its pre-TEE years, the Settebello had been an evening or midday service, departing Milan at 5:45 p.m. and Rome around 10:30 a.m., and the Milan–Rome trips at those times of day were taken over by a different TEE, the Ambrosiano, upon the Settebello's designation as a TEE.

Scenery along the route included mountain views on the ascent to the 18.4 km (11.4 mi) Apennine Tunnel, on the Bologna–Florence section. On 3 June 1984, the Settebello was renamed Colosseum, which did not use the class-ETR 300 trainsets.

== Speed and travel time ==
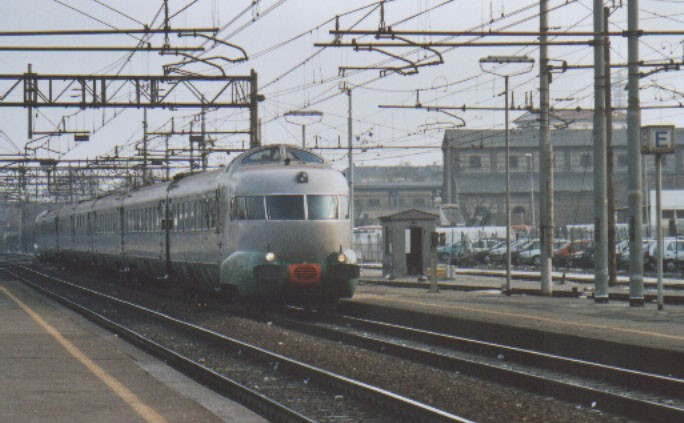
Preserved ex-Settebello trainset in 2003

The full journey between Milan and Rome took a little more than six hours in 1963. By 1974, when the train became a Trans-Europe Express, the trip was scheduled to take only 5 hours, 45 minutes, in both directions, and by 1977 the travel time had been reduced by another 10 minutes.

As of 1964, the train's top speed in normal operation was 150 kilometres per hour (93 mph), but it was authorized for speeds of up to 160 km/h. The portion of the route with the fastest average speed was the Milano–Bologna section, averaging 130 kilometres per hour (81 mph). The average speed over the entire journey, including stops, was 113.9 km/h (70.8 mph), as of 1978. Work under way in the mid-1970s on upgrading of the line was predicted to allow Settebello's normal top speed to be increased to about 160 km/h (99 mph).

== See also ==
- History of rail transport in Italy
- List of named passenger trains of Europe
