= FS Class E.632 =

FS class E.632
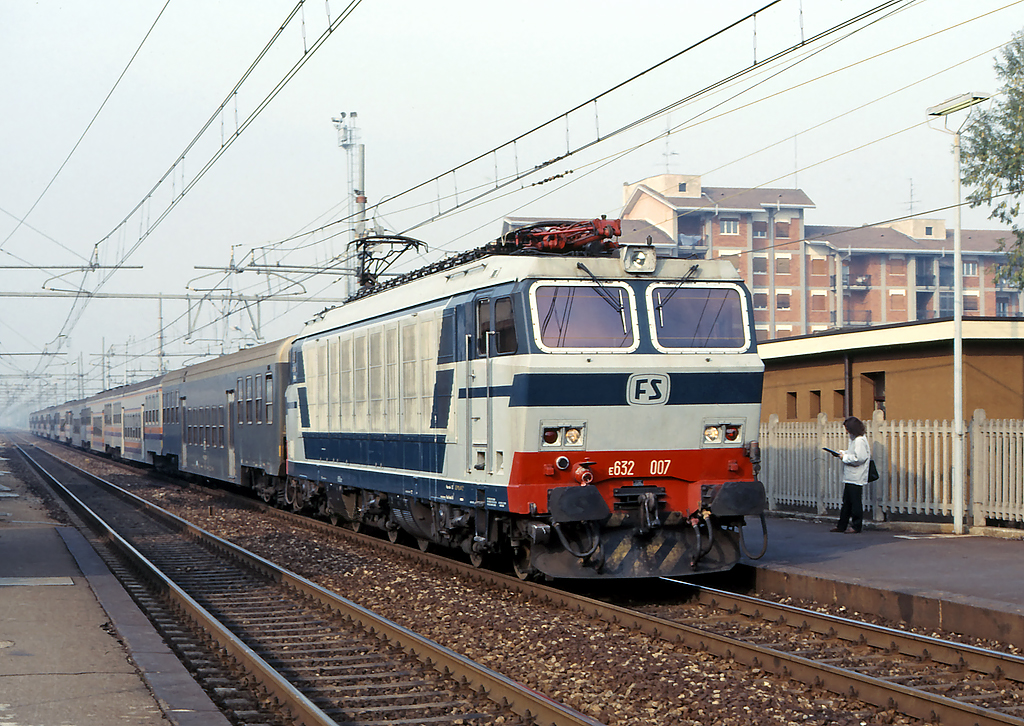
- E.632 in the original livery
Type and origin
- Power type: Electric
- Build date: 1982-1987
Specifications
- Configuration
  - AAR: B-B-B
  - UIC: B′B′B′
- Gauge: 1,435 mm (4 ft 8 1/2 in) standard gauge
- Wheel diameter: 1.040 m (40.94 in)
- Wheelbase: 12.650 m (41 ft 6 in) between bogie pivots 2.150 m (84.65 in) between axles of each bogie
- Length: 17.800 m (58 ft 4 3/4 in)
- Width: 3.000 m (9 ft 10 1/8 in)
- Height: 4.310 m (14 ft 1 5/8 in)
- Loco weight: 103 t (101 long tons; 114 short tons)
- Electric system/s: 3,000 V DC Catenary
- Current pickup: Pantograph
- Traction motors: DC series
- Transmission: 36/64 gear ratio
- Loco brake: Oerlikon FV4E
- Safety systems: RSC4; SCMT
Performance figures
- Maximum speed: 160 km/h (99 mph)
- Power output: 4,200 kW (5,600 hp)
Career
- Operators: FS Trenitalia
- Number in class: 65 (Note: Plus one prototype)
- Nicknames: "Tigre", "Tigrone" (E652), "Tigrotto" (E620 FNM)
- First run: 1982
- Disposition: In service

FS class E.633
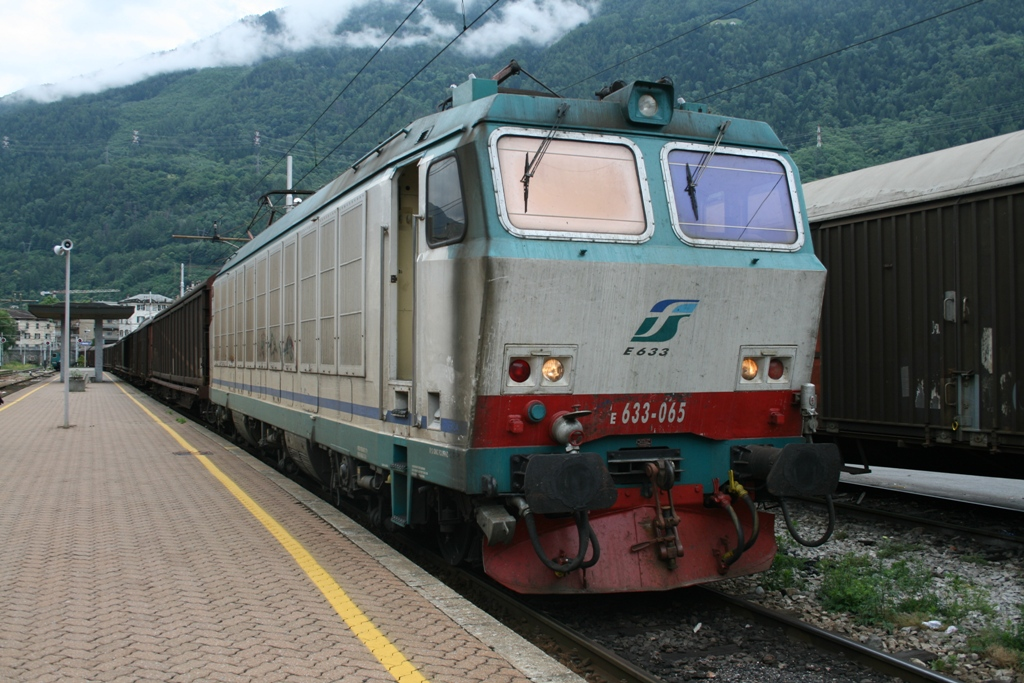
- An E.633 with a cargo train in Santhià, 2006.
Type and origin
- Power type: Electric
- Build date: 1979-1987
Specifications
- Configuration
  - UIC: B′B′B′
- Wheel diameter: 1.040 m (40.94 in)
- Wheelbase: 12.650 m (41 ft 6 in) between bogie pivots 2.150 m (84.65 in) between axles of each bogie
- Length: 17.800 m (58 ft 4 3/4 in)
- Width: 3.000 m (9 ft 10 1/8 in)
- Height: 4.310 m (14 ft 1 5/8 in)
- Loco weight: 103 t (101 long tons; 114 short tons)
- Electric system/s: 3,000 V DC Catenary
- Current pickup: Pantograph
- Traction motors: DC series
- Transmission: 29/64 gear ratio
Performance figures
- Maximum speed: 130 km/h (81 mph)
- Power output: 4,200 kW (5,600 hp)
- Tractive effort: 308 kN
Career
- Operators: FS Trenitalia
- Number in class: 147 (Note: Plus 4 prototypes)
- First run: 1979
- Disposition: In service

The FS E.632 and E.633 are two classes of Italian railways electric locomotives. They were introduced in the course of the 1980s.

The locomotives are nicknamed Tigre ("tiger").

== History ==
The E.632/E.633 were the first Italian locomotives to be provided with electronic traction control system, on the basis of the experiments made with the E.444.005 test locomotive. They were designed to fulfill a requirement from the Ferrovie dello Stato (or FS, then the quasi-monopolist of Italian railways) for a new locomotive to be used with medium-weight passenger trains and a similar one for cargo services on steep lines.

The first unit ran on October 11, 1979. After a troublesome program of tests with the first five prototypes, a first order for 90 engines (75 E.633, the cargo version, and 15 E.632) was issued. Regular services began in 1983 in northern Italy. Once the teething problems were solved, the class proved highly successful and reliable.

== Technical details ==
Differently from many of the previous FS classes, the E.632/633 carbody is not articulated. The power plant is made of three 1,635 kilowatts (2,193 hp) FS T850 DC motors, mounted on monomotor bogies, each with two axles. Each motor is provided with a three-frequency chopper which takes place of the resistor network used on older Italian locomotives (rheostat). This allow the motors to run for an indefinite period of time without risks.

The two classes have different transmission gear: 36/64 for the E.632, with a maximum speed of 160 km/h (99 mph), and 29/64, with a maximum speed of only 130 km/h (81 mph) but a higher tractive effort. Since the beginning, all units were provided with the standard 78-wire cable for coupling with driving passenger cars, useful in the formation of commuter push-pull trains. 40 E633s were also fitted with a 13-wire ZDS cable (comando multiplo) in order to allow hauling with multiple units by only one engine crew, from the "master" locomotive.

The locomotives have, in addition to pneumatic brakes, a rheostatic braking system. The braking rheostat is placed on the roof, between the pantographs. The air brake employs a mixed shoes-disc system (one shoe per wheel and one disc per axle), due to space issues about the motor placement; also, E.632 have 10 in (254 mm) brake cylinders, while E.633 8 in (203.2 mm). The chopper regulation and the rheostatic braking allow the driver to set an automatic speed control; the locomotive will try to keep the set speed by electrically braking or by tractioning if needed. This group has been the first in Italy that allowed this.

== Related development ==
The E.632/633 was used as base for the development of the E.491/492 locomotives for use with 25 kV AC lines in Sardinia, which however were never mass built.

Class E.652 is a type of locomotive derived from E.633/2. They unite the acceleration and hauling capacities of E.633 with the speed of E.632 (160 km/h or 99 mph); externally they are almost identical to E.632/3, but the electrical part is very different. The first unit was built in 1989, and have been the first Italian locomotive with electronic board diagnostics and relative screen on the driver's desk.

As of 2017, 171 E.652s are assigned to the Global Logistic (Cargo) division of Trenitalia, hauling freight trains, though sometimes can be seen hauling passenger trains (often long-range ones) on rescue services due to failures.

The B-B locomotive E.620 of Ferrovie Nord Milano (nicknamed Tigrotto) is a two-bogie version of the class.
