= Mauro Moretti =

Italian businessman

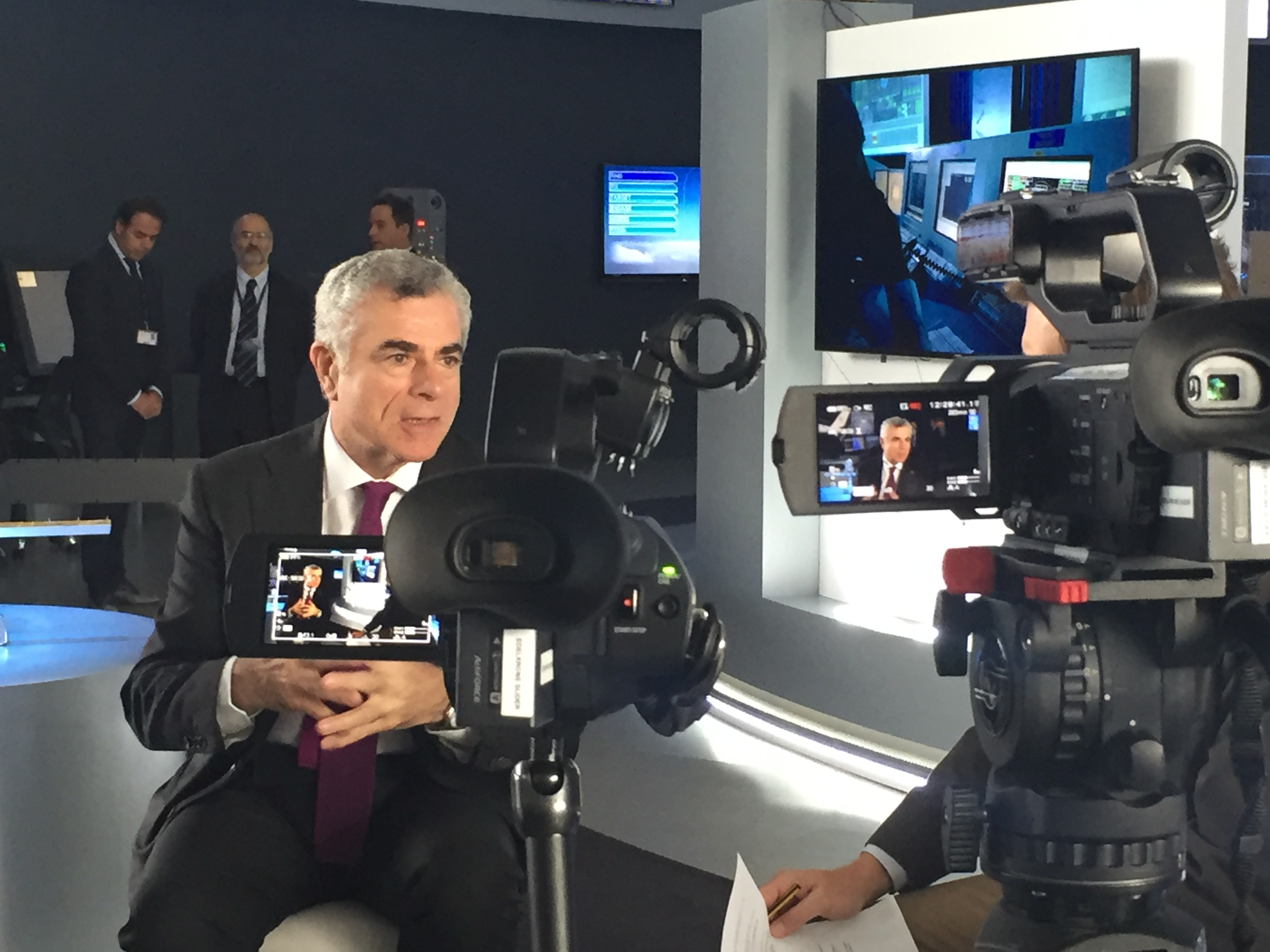
Mauro Moretti

Mauro Moretti (born 29 October 1953) is an Italian executive, former CEO and general manager of Leonardo S.p.A. (formerly Finmeccanica) from May 2014 to May 2017 and convicted felon.

He is also president of the AeroSpace and Defence Industries Association of Europe since March 2015, chairman of the Italy-Japan Business Group since September 2015, honorary chairman of the Italian Industries Federation for Aerospace, Defence and Security since July 2014, and president of the Italian FS Italian Foundation since 2013.

He has been CEO of Ferrovie dello Stato Italiane and chairman of the Community of European Railway and Infrastructure Companies. He was Mompeo mayor in 2004 and he worked as syndicalist.

== Biography ==
Mauro Moretti joined Ferrovie dello Stato a few months after graduating in Electro Technical Engineering at Bologna University. His career continued in FS where, after passing a public examination, he reached an executive position. Since then, he has held numerous positions in various sectors and with various companies of the Group. Moretti has been Vice-Director of the Technologies and System Development Division (December 1991), Director of the Technological Development and Rolling Stock Division (March 1993), Managing Director of Metropolis, the Group company for the management, development of real estate assets (February 1994).

In December 1997 Moretti became the director of "Area Strategica di Affari" (ASA)- Business Strategies, which he managed even after it was transformed into the Infrastructure Division (July 1999). In February 2001 Moretti became a member of the board of directors of Ferrovie dello Stato. In July of the same year, Rete Ferroviaria Italiana was set up and he was appointed managing director. During his time in FS he also became a cadre of the trade union CGIL Trasporti, arriving to be its secretary from 1986 to 1991.

In September 2006 he was appointed chief executive officer of Ferrovie dello Stato Italiane Spa.

In May 2014 Finmeccanica (Leonardo S.p.A. since 1 January 2017) Board of Directors appointed Mauro Moretti as new Chief Executive Officer and General Manager of the Group.

In 2015, Moretti has launched the company's reorganisation plan for its competitiveness in global markets. The plan's objective was to transform the company into a more integrated industrial hub, structured in seven operational divisions. The company's activities have been focused on the core business of Aerospace, Defence and Security and non-strategic assets, such as the Transport sector, have been sold off. At the same time, Moretti has implemented plans for debt and cost reduction and profitability recovery. In 2016, Moretti also proposed to change the company name from Finmeccanica to Leonardo SpA, a name inspired by the Italian scientist Leonardo da Vinci.

On 30 January 2017, Moretti was convicted by an Italian court for his role in a train crash in 2009, in which a freight train carrying liquefied gas derailed and caught fire at the Italian town of Viareggio, killing 32 people. Moretti received a seven-year jail sentence, but several levels of appeal may take years to resolve the conviction during which time Moretti will be free. Despite initial support from the company in retaining Moretti in his role during this legal process he was shortly removed from the position of CEO.

In January 2021, the Supreme Court of Cassation overturned Moretti's conviction as the statute of limitations for a manslaughter conviction had expired. The case was remanded to the appeals court of Florence.

== Honours and awards ==
- Knight of the Order of Merit for Labour: nominated by president of Italy Giorgio Napolitano (2010).
- Honorary degree in mechanical engineering from University of Cassino
- Moretti has been awarded in Milan by the Financial Company Awards 2008 as the best manager of the year.
