= Rete Ferroviaria Italiana =

Italian state-owned transport enterprise

Rete Ferroviaria Italiana (RFI)

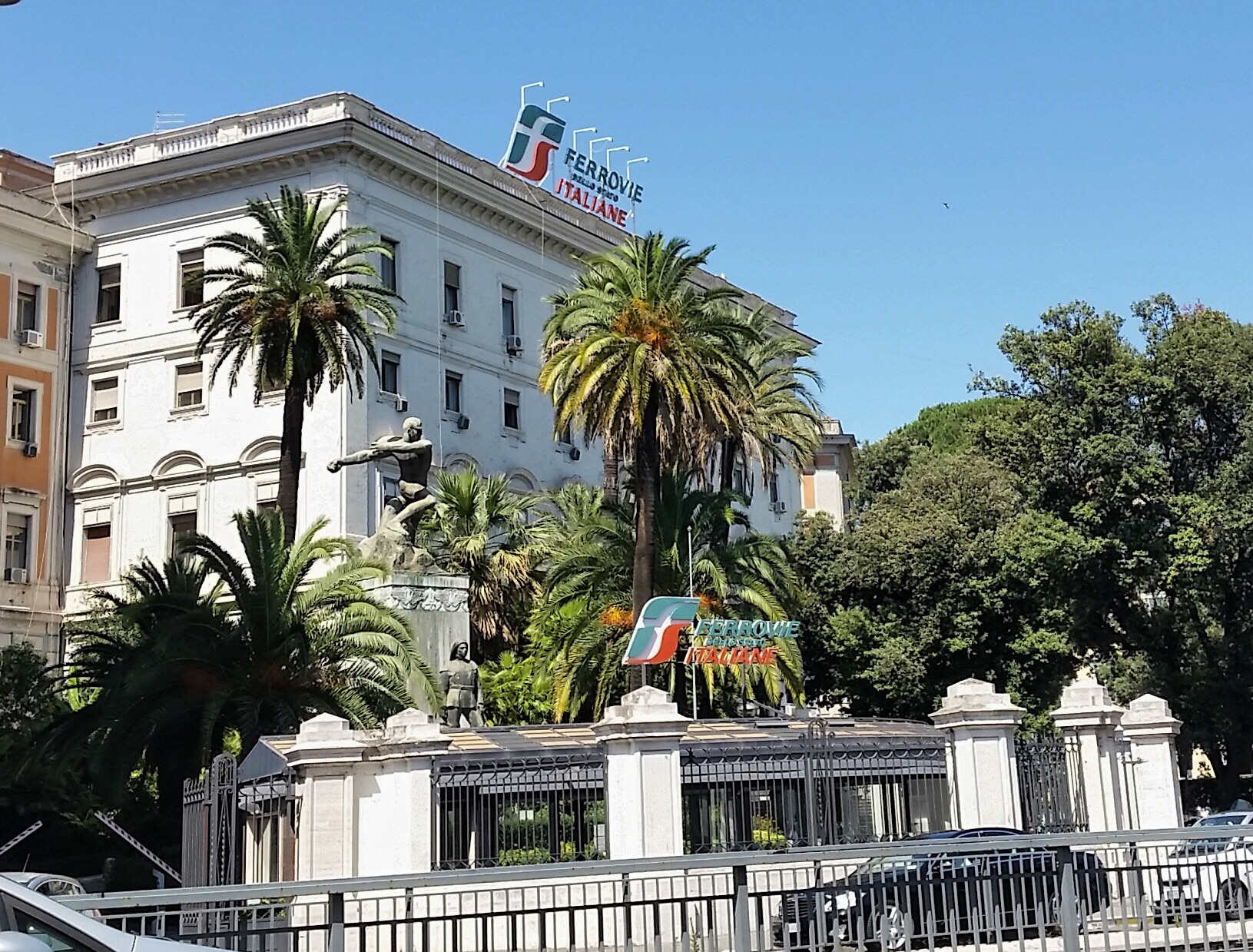
- Headquarters in Rome
- Type: Società per Azioni
- Industry: Rail infrastructure management
- Founded: 1 July 2001; 25 years ago
- Headquarters: Rome, Italy
- Area served: Italy
- Key people: Anna Masutti (Chairman) and Vera Fiorani (CEO)
- Services: Rail signalling, maintenance, etc.
- Revenue: ▲€ 3,057 million (2021)
- Net income: ▲€ 275 million (2021)
- Number of employees: ▲27,892 (2021)
- Parent: Ferrovie dello Stato (FS)
- Subsidiaries: Grandi Stazioni Rail S.p.A. (100%), Bluferries S.r.l. (100%), Blue Jet S.r.l. (100%), Terminali Italia S.r.l. (100%), Infrarail Firenze S.r.l (100%), Tunnel Ferroviario del Brennero S.p.A. (89.9%), Quadrante Europa Terminal Gate S.p.A. (50%)
- Website: www.rfi.it/en.html

Rete Ferroviaria Italiana (RFI) is the Italian railway infrastructure manager, subsidiary of Ferrovie dello Stato Italiane (FS), a state-owned holding company. RFI is the owner of Italy's railway network, it provides signalling, maintenance and other services for the railway network. It also operates train ferries between the Italian Peninsula and Sicily.

RFI's origins can be traced back to a series of railway sector reforms enacted by the Italian government during the late 1980s and 1990s. The agency was founded on 1 July 2001 in accordance with a European directive on rail transport that mandated the separation of the infrastructure operator and the service operators. Prior to RFI's creation, the Italian rail network was managed directly by FS. The agency has been periodically accused of failure to be impartial, including allegations of favouring sibling company Trenitalia over independent operations. The company has been fined in the past for anti-trust breaches. Since its creation, revenue abstraction from access charges have steadily increased, primarily due to the expansion of Italy's high-speed rail network, even as access charges have been decreased.

== History ==
Between the late 1980s and the early 2000s, the Italian government directed major restructurion of Italy's railways. During 1992, Ferrovie dello Stato (FS) had been converted to a joint-stock company, albeit remaining fully state-owned. Six years later, in order to comply with recently issued railway legislation by the European Union, the Italian government planned the company's vertical separation between its infrastructure and services; while management of passenger service was to be handled by Trenitalia, the management of the lines themselves and general infrastructure lines was to be assigned to the newly created infrastructure management agency RFI. Since its creation, RFI has been a subsidiary of FS, and thus is a 100 percent state-owned entity with limited independence. RFI's independence and neutrality have occasionally been publicly called into question.

During the 2000s and 2010s, RFI has reported a substantial growth in revenue derived from operators for access to the Italian high-speed rail network. This has been due to a greater rate of utilisation having been achieved, which can be in turn partially attributed to the arrival of private operators, such as Nuovo Trasporto Viaggiatori (NTV), upon the Italian rail network. Between 2009 and 2014, the revenue associated with access charges rose from €903.1 million to €1,051.2 million in spite of a 15 percent price drop in these charges as a result of Ministerial Decree n.330 being issued in 10 September 2013.

Following the 2009 Viareggio train derailment, which caused the death of 32 people, a criminal proceeding was initiated. As a result of the investigation, former RFI CEOs Mauro Moretti and Michele Mario Elia were convicted for their roles in causing the accident. The Supreme Court later annulled the sentence of the appeal judge, referring the positions of the CEOs to the Florence Court of Appeal for a new judgment. The Supreme Court also pronounced a definitive sentence of acquittal of RFI from the accused responsibility.

2023 Train map of Europe

As a natural result of its dominant position in the market, RFI's policies and actions are able to play a prominent role in determining the level of fair access to Italy's railway infrastructure, particularly to the various terminals, depots, maintenance facilities and retail areas under its ownership. In exchange for their use, all operators are required to pay corresponding charges to RFI. During 2016, railway author Christian Desmaris observed that it was somewhat problematic for authorities to ensure that RFI is providing fair access to retail facilities, information and ticketing systems and other computer-based systems.

Due to the relatively large investments required to enter the market, an excessive charging scheme could deter potential new entrants to challenge incumbent operators. Italy's antitrust agency has published numerous reports pertaining to railway infrastructure issues, and performed in-depth investigations into both RFI and Trenitalia for potential anti-competitive actions, the authority typically found no evidence of any such abuses of position. However, during August 2018, RFI was fined €620,000 for anti-competitive practices that favoured Trenitalia over the privately operated NTV.

During the 2010s, RFI, in conjunction with the development of ETR 1000 by AnsaldoBreda and Bombardier Transportation, was at one point working on the necessary infrastructure changes to allow trains to reach up to 360 km/h (220 mph) in regular operation. However, on 28 May 2018, the Ministry of Infrastructure and Transport and the National Association for Railway Safety decided not to run the 385 km/h tests required to allow commercial operation at 350 km/h, thus limiting the maximum commercial speed on the existing Italian high-speed lines to 300 km/h and cancelling the project.
