= FS Class ETR 300 =

Italian high speed electric multiple unit

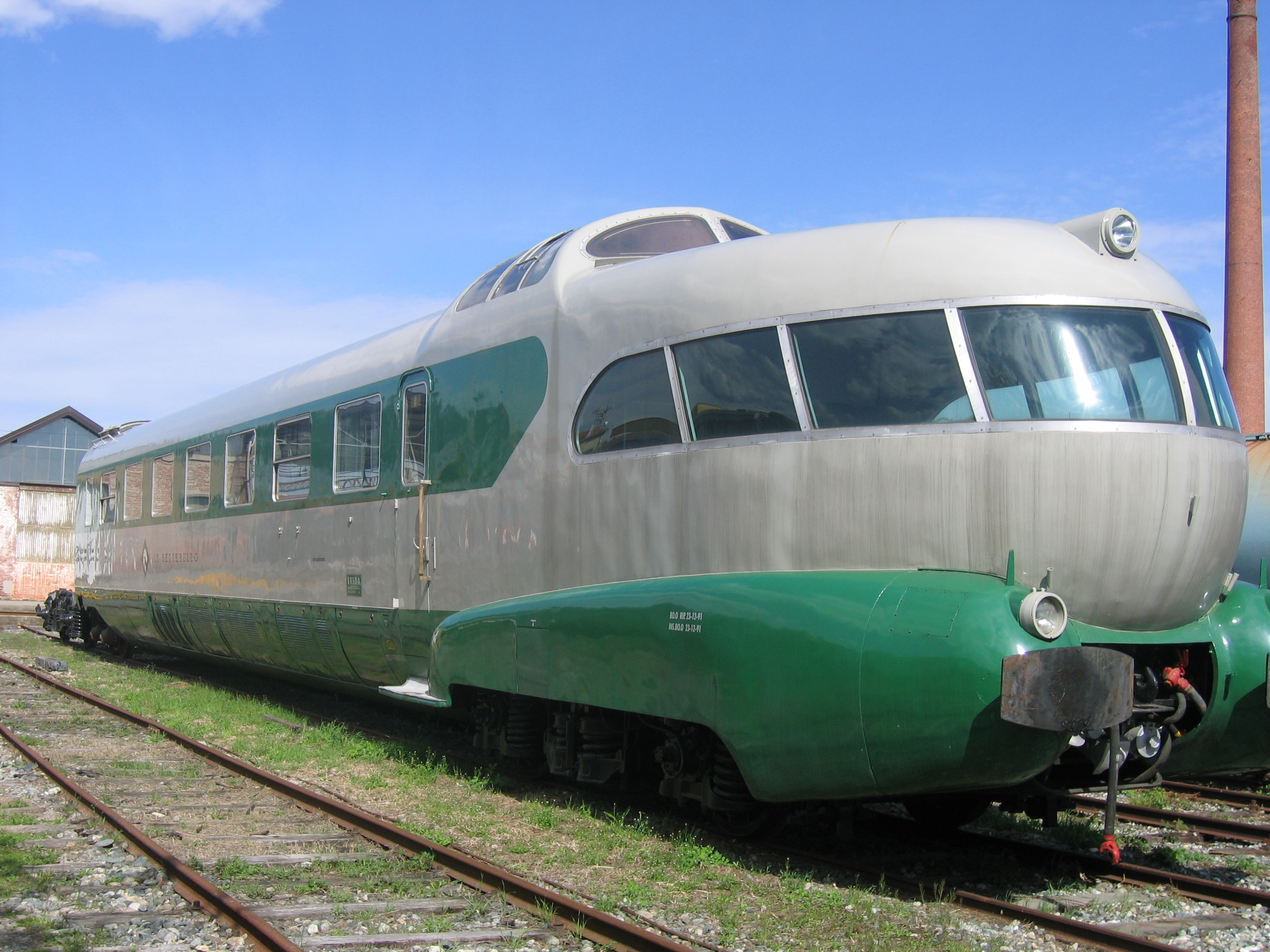
- Power car of a class ETR-300 train set in 2006
- In service: 1953–1988 (until 2004 for private-hire trips only)
- Manufacturer: Breda
- Constructed: 1952 – c. 1958/59
- Entered service: 1953–1959
- Refurbished: 1991 (only trainset no. 302)
- Number built: 3 trainsets
- Number preserved: 1 trainset
- Number scrapped: 2 trainsets
- Formation: Seven-car trainset
- Fleet numbers: (ETR-) 301–303
- Capacity: 190
- Operators: Ferrovie dello Stato (FS)

Specifications
- Maximum speed: 200 km/h (125 mph)
- Electric system(s): 3 kV DC Overhead catenary
- Current collection: Pantograph
- Track gauge: 1,435 mm (4 ft 8 1/2 in) standard gauge

The ETR 300, also known as "Settebello-type" for its use on the former Settebello train service, is a type of Italian fast electric multiple unit (EMU) trainset formerly operated by Ferrovie dello Stato. The letters ETR stood for elettrotreno rapido (Italian for high-speed electric train). Due to its aerodynamically low-drag profile, it had a maximum speed of 200 km/h (124 mph) and a power output of 2,600 kW (3,500 hp). Manufactured for FS by Breda, a total of only three trainsets were built, numbered ETR 301–303.

== History ==
Because the Italian Railways' high-speed rolling stock was extensively damaged during World War II, the company started developing the project of a new first-class only EMU (ETR, Elettrotreno rapido) which had to be used on the most important long-haul services. The train was built by Società Italiana Ernesto Breda and the first unit, no. 301, was delivered to FS on 21 November 1952. The second unit, no. 302, entered service in March 1953, while the last one, no. 303, was launched in February 1959. The first two ETR 300-series trains entered regular service between Milan and Rome on 30 March 1953, on the new Settebello service. The ETR-300 sets were often referred to informally as "Settebello"-type because they were built for use on the Settebello service.

The train could reach a speed of 160 km/h (99 mph). The Settebello was considered one of the symbols of the Italian economical and industrial development and prosperity after the war. In 1969, the train was upgraded: new engines (more powerful than the former ones), new bogies and a new safety system were installed in order to allow it to reach a maximum speed of 200 km/h (124 mph), at which the train never actually ran. In the 1970s, the upgrading enabled the ETR 300s to complete the journey between Milan and Rome in 5 hours and 45 minutes.

On 26 May 1974, the train started operating as the TEE Settebello as part of the Trans Europ Express network, but the Settebello service was discontinued on 2 June 1984, and the ETR 300 series was removed from service on that route (Milan–Rome). From 3 June, the trainsets were used for less important trains between Milan, Venice, Florence and Genoa. In 1988, the trains were retired from regular passenger service. Nos. 301 and 303 were abandoned and scrapped in 1998, under safety protocols, due to the presence of asbestos, leaving only number ETR 302 surviving, and used for occasional display or private hire.

== Last surviving set ==
In the early 1990s the Italian State Railways had planned a huge refurbishment for the three ETR-300 sets in order to make these trains more safe, technologically advanced and suitable for Intercity services, but in the end, only no. 302 trainset was converted. All the cars were rebuilt inside: the original furniture designed by Giò Ponti was dismantled and replaced with an ordinary open-space layout; new seats similar to other passenger coaches' ones were installed and the train was divided for the first time into two classes. Many parts of the electrical equipment were replaced with different ones. This refurbishment made the train more modern-looking, but it lost all its historical, elegant furniture, which some viewed as the most important features that made the ETR 300 class ('Settebello'-type) famous in Europe.

The converted trainset was not used in regular service, as had once been planned, but only for exhibitions and charter services. The ETR 302 was definitely retired in January 2004. By 2016, it had been abandoned for 12 years near the Adriatic coast of Italy; it had rusted and been heavily damaged by vandals, and many parts were missing. In August 2016, the train was rescued by Italian State Railways' Heritage Foundation (Fondazione FS Italiane) and brought to Voghera Workshops. It is planned to be completely restored by refabricating missing parts and the original furniture, in order to enable the trainset to be used as a luxury train for tourist services.

== Arlecchino (ETR 250) ==
Four trains of a shorter, four-car version, the ETR 250, called "Arlecchino" ("Harlequin"), were built by Breda in 1960. Those trains had a first-class-only, open-space layout, and one of the cars was used as a kitchen and baggage car. They were used until 1986, when three of them were refurbished and used for charter services. Those three were scrapped in the late 1990s and early 2000s. The surviving set, train no. 252, was restored between 2016 and 2019. Now, it is used for tourist trains.
