= Ferrovie dello Stato Italiane =

State-owned railway holding company of Italy

Ferrovie dello Stato Italiane S.p.A.
- Ferrovie dello Stato

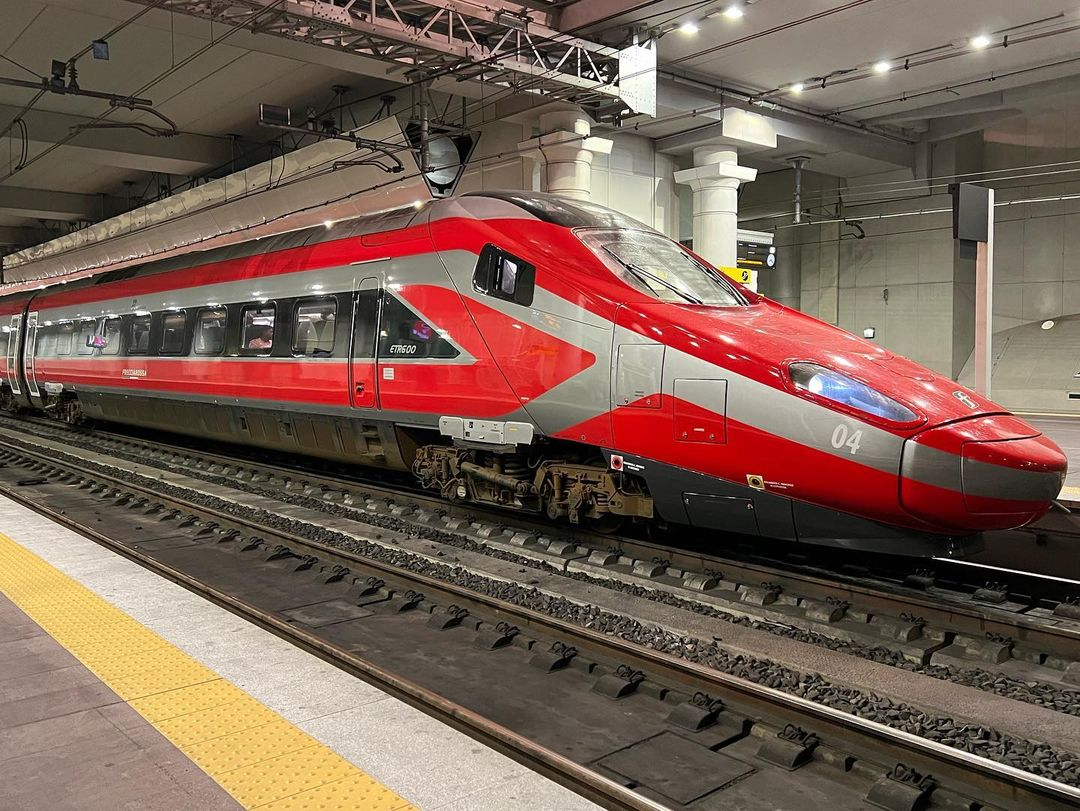
- Frecciarossa, premier high-speed train

Overview
- Locale: Italy
- Dates of operation: 1905–present

Technical
- Length: 16,829 km (10,457 mi)

Other
- Website: www.fsitaliane.it

Ferrovie dello Stato Italiane S.p.A.
- Type: S.p.A.
- Industry: Rail transport, logistics
- Headquarters: Rome, Italy
- Key people: Luigi Ferraris (CEO); Nicoletta Giadrossi (chairwoman)
- Revenue: € 14,8 billion (2023)
- Net income: € 100 million (2022)
- Number of employees: 92,446 (2023)
- Subsidiaries: ANAS; Busitalia Sita Nord; Qbuzz; Fercredit; Ferrovie del Sud Est e Servizi Automobilistici; Ferservizi; FS Sistemi Urbani; FS Security; Grandi Stazioni; Italcertifer; Italferr; Mercitalia Rail; Netinera; Nugo; Iryo; Hellenic Train; Trenitalia; FS Treni Turistici Italiani; Avanti West Coast (30%); c2c (until 2025); Trenitalia France (Before known as Thello); Rete Ferroviaria Italiana; Fondazione FS Italiane

Ferrovie dello Stato Italiane S.p.A. (Italian pronunciation: [ferroˈviːe dello ˈstaːto itaˈljaːne]; lit. 'Italian State Railways JSC'; previously only Ferrovie dello Stato, hence the initialism FS) is Italy's national state-owned railway holding company that manages transport, infrastructure, real estate services, and other services in Italy and other European countries.

== History ==
=== Early years ===
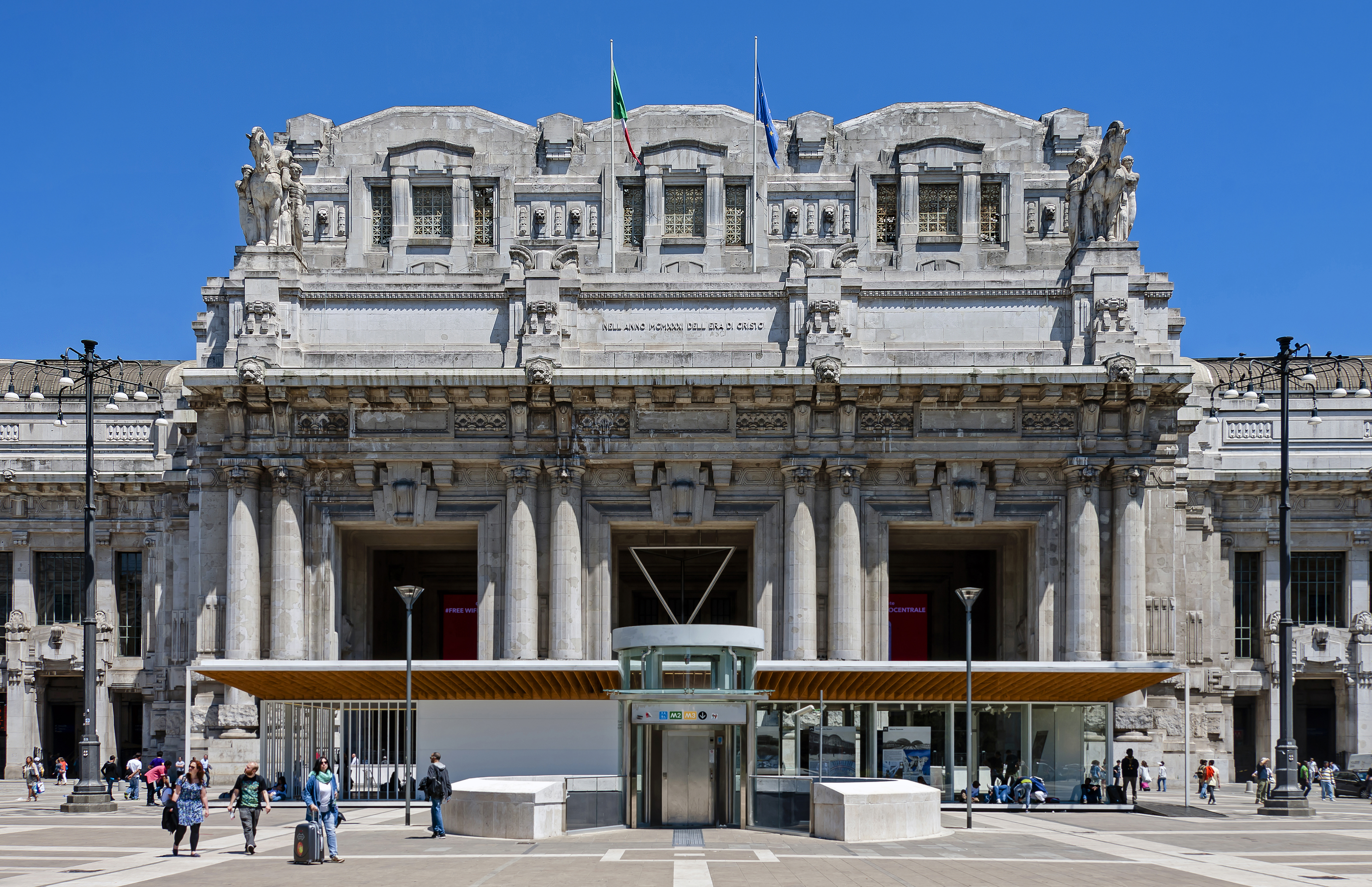
Milano Centrale railway station in Milan, inaugurated in 1931

The origins of Ferrovie dello Stato Italiane can be traced back to an act enacted by the Italian government on 22 April 1905, under which took the state took control over the majority of railways across Italy; in comparison with other European countries, Italy's nationalisation of the railways was relatively early. Prior to this, Italy's various railways had been privately owned and managed, albeit typically subsidised by the Kingdom of Italy, having been organised as such since their creation in the mid 1800s. The Italian government's decision to nationalise the railways, thereby taking greater control over them, was due to their strategic importance in Italy's economic and territorial prosperity, and had followed three decades of debate and intense review of the circumstances and options available.

Upon its creation, Ferrovie dello Stato was a unique entity, being directly linked to a specific government ministry yet retaining its own board of directors. The first director general was Riccardo Bianchi, woh had previously been the general director of the Sicilian Railways. Over time, the Ministry of Public Works gradually exerted greater control over Ferrovie dello Stato and making it less autonomous, such as requiring ministerial approval for contracts valued in excess of 200,00 lire from 1909 onwards.

Early efforts were made to improve the quality and productivity of rolling stock; one effect of this focus was a 20 percent increase in trains between 1 July 1906 and 30 June 1907. In response to widespread criticism about a lack of onboard heating, numerous trains were retrofitted with steam heating. Between 1906 and 1909, the number of daily trains provisioned with gangway connections rose from 4,600 to 30,100. Furthermore, for increased safety and faster deceleration, the Westinghouse air brake was rolled out, the number of trains equipped with it doubling during the first four years of operation alone. Other areas of improvement included the transition from gas lighting of carriages to electric lighting, and research into new types of steam locomotives. In June 1912, Ferrovie dello Stato owned 5,021 steam locomotives, 151 railcars, 10,037 coaches, 3,371 baggage cars and 92,990 goods wagons.

The interwar period saw substantial changes to the several aspects of the Italian railway system. Around the time the rise of Fascism in the early 1920s, a centralisation policy was carried out. The board of directors and chief administrator office were abolished in late 1922, instead, the institution was administered by a commissioner that was appointed by the King until April 1924. After this point, Ferrovie dello Stato became managed by the newly-created Ministry of Communications (the portfolio of which including rail transport) under Costanzo Ciano. Following industrial action and employee discontent, as well as declining productivities during the 1910s and early 1920s, more than 50,000 of the 226,907 railway workers in June 2022 lost their jobs.

Throughout the 1920s and 1930s, considerable investment was directed into the railways, resulting in the opening of numerous new stations, the expansion of others, and the completion of several new direct lines (direttissime); on account of the latter policy, the Italian railway network attained its maximum route length of 23.227 km in 1942. In many places, lines were double-tracked, enabling the introduction of faster trains capable of speeds as high as 201 kmph. By the end of the 1930s, the traction operating on Italy's railways comprised roughly 60 percent steam locomotives, while the remainder were a mix of electric and diesel locomotives. Between 1921 and 1937, railway travel times decreased considerably, with one study estimating the decrease to be greater than 20 percent.

Perhaps the most visible change made during the interwar period was the deployment of railway electrification; while small-scale efforts had commenced prior to the First World War, totalling 377 km in length by 1915, during the 1920s alone, the amount of electrified track in Italy increased by 243 percent, albeit being initially cantered in the north west of the country. Major central routes would be electrified during the late 1930s while most southern lines would only see electrification work in the aftermath of the Second World War.

=== From World War II to 1985 ===
After the armistice on 8 September 1943, Italy was divided and train operations were separately directed too, with separate headquarters in Salerno for the south and Verona for the north. At the end of 1944, the Ministry of Communications was split and the new Ministry of Transport was created, including the general management of Ferrovie dello Stato, and in 1945, the company was renamed Azienda Autonoma delle Ferrovie dello Stato.

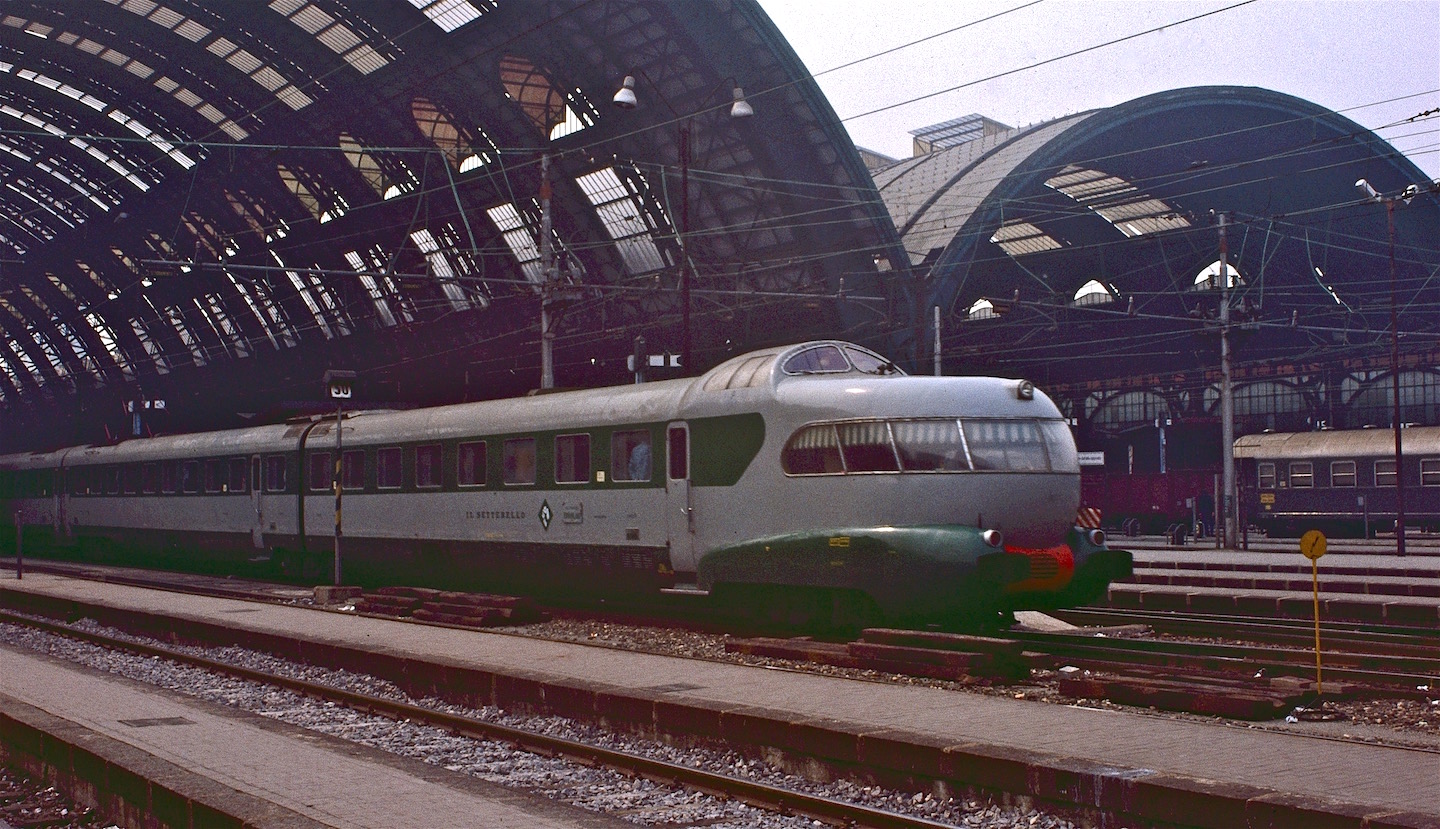
Settebello, iconic high-speed train of 1950s

The period after World War II was particularly challenging, since most of the Italian rail network was severely damaged and the rolling stock was obsolete. Reconstruction took place between 1946 and 1950, after which time the majority of railway lines were reopened. In the aftermath of the conflict, the Ministry of Transport had been created; the state railways was merged into it but functionally operated as an autonomous entity.

The 1950s saw a rise in personal transport amongst the Italian population, a trend that included the scooter as well as the car. In response to this competition, a new generation of faster trains were developed and introduced, including the ETR 300, and many sections of the national network were electrified and sometimes doubled. In 1957, the new ALn 442/448 multiple unit was introduced, greatly reducing travel time on the Italian network. During these years, the rolling stock was generally renewed and expanded with the mass construction of electrical and diesel multiple units, like the Ale 883, ALe 840 and ALn 772. The FS ALn 668 diesel multiple unit was introduced in 1956.

In the following years, three multiple units out of four were 668, which replaced many older units. Many electrical multiple units were also introduced during this period, like the ALe 601, progenitor of the Ale 801/940 and ALe 803 EMU, still in use today on regional service.

During the 1970s, a new generation of electronically-operated railcars and power trains were first introduced on the Italian network, starting with the G.A.I. (Gruppo Aziende Italiane) trains for regional and metropolitan service. The new E.444 was the first attempt on high-speed rail, with a top speed of 200 km/h (120 mph). The ETR 401 (1976) was the first prototype of the new Pendolino class. Following other network improvements, works for the first Italian high-speed rail line started in these years.

The Direttissima line from Florence to Rome was partially opened in 1986 and concluded in 1992. In 1986, trains were travelling the line at 200 km/h (120 mph), surpassing for the first time the previous maximum limit of 180 km/h on the Italian network. In 1988, the ETR 450 Pendolino was travelling regularly at 250 km/h (160 mph), today's top speed on the line. The line was the fastest in Europe after the French TGV lines.

During the mid-1970s, calls for railway reform increases significantly. This period was marked by increasingly high operational deficits, while trade unions advocated for privatisation on the premise that the 220,000 railway workers would receive high salaries under the private sector. The FS was left unchanged in its administrative structure until the end of 1985. From the following year, after 80 years, the Azienda Autonoma delle Ferrovie dello Stato was replaced by a new company, Ferrovie dello Stato. In terms of organisational structure, the new entity had an equal legal status to any enterprise, which included budgetary autonomy. The old logo was renewed in 1982 and again in 1994, with the introduction of the XMPR livery.

=== 1986–present ===
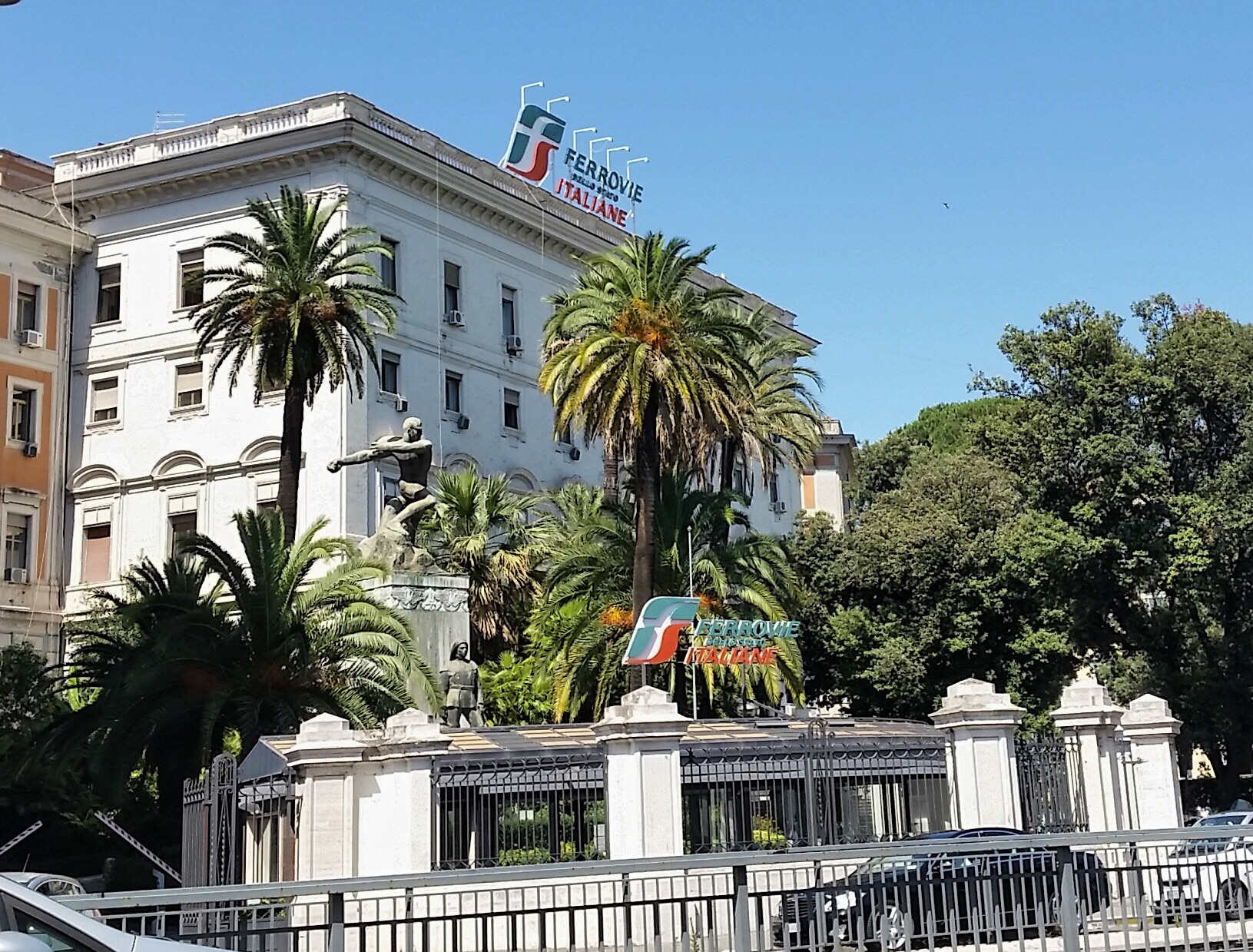
FS headquarters in Rome

The newly born Ferrovie dello Stato underwent major structural transformations between 1986 and 1992. The workforce was reduced to half: from 216,310 employees in 1988 to 112,018 in 1999. Divisions were created to rationalise the management.

The organisation was converted from a government agency to a state-owned enterprise in 1992 with the creation of the new Ferrovie dello Stato SpA, a joint-stock company, following a European guideline. However, it was not privatised: it remained fully owned by the Italian Government.

On 1 June 2000, the company's two main divisions, service and infrastructure, were separated and two different independent companies were created: Trenitalia, responsible for transport service, and Rete Ferroviaria Italiana, responsible for the management of the rail infrastructure. Both companies were still subsidiaries of Ferrovie dello Stato Holding SpA.

In 2011, Ferrovie dello Stato Italiane bought the German Netinera. In July 2016, Busitalia (part of Ferrovie dello Stato Italiane) purchased the Dutch company Qbuzz. In February 2017, Trenitalia bought the British train operating company c2c from National Express. In September 2017, an agreement to buy 100 percent of the Greek railways TrainOSE in exchange for €45m was signed.

== Company structure ==
=== Subsidiaries ===
==== Bluferries ====
Blufferies is a subsidiary company of Ferrovie dello Stato (Italy's Rail Infrastructure Manager) that operates ferries across the Strait of Messina. It provides transport across the strait for cars and trains. The company employs approximately 130 people.

Blu Jet was established in August 2018, following the spin-off procedure of the Bluferries srl branch of the company, also solely owned by RFI SpA, and since 1st May 2019 Blu Jet has been operating the connection between the cities of Messina and Villa San Giovanni (docks near the railway station). Passenger maritime transport across the Strait of Messina using high-speed vessels (trip duration 20').

==== Trenitalia ====
Trenitalia is the most important subsidiary of the company, as it manages all the trains of the company group. Trenitalia is the primary train operator in Italy. It was established in 2000 following a European Union directive on the deregulation of rail transport.

==== Hellenic Train ====
Hellenic Train, the sole operator for passenger and the main for freight services in Greece, has been under the company's management since 2017. The company employs over 1,000 people.

==== Other subsidiaries ====
- Busitalia
- Centostazioni
- Fercredit
- Ferservizi
- FS Logistica
- FS Sistemi Urbani
- Grandi Stazioni
- Italferr
- Netinera
- Rete Ferroviaria Italiana, which manages the infrastructure of the Italian rail network
- Mercitalia, the group's freight operations subsidiary (founded in 2017)

=== ANAS ===
ANAS (Italian: Azienda Nazionale Autonoma delle Strade, English: National Autonomous Roads Corporation) manages the construction and maintenance of motorways and state highways in Italy.

=== Ferry service ===
Ferrovie dello Stato Italiane owns and operates a ferry service for rail trains connecting the mainland to Sicily, crossing the Strait of Messina. They carry InterCity, InterCityNotte, and goods wagon by means of ferry boats.

Until 2009 there was another ferry service for freight transport, which was activated in 1961 to connect the continent to the Sardinia, between Civitavecchia and Golfo Aranci. Since 2010, after the regular service has been suspended, there is an on-call service for Messina Marittima and Villa San Giovanni Mare.

=== Former CEOs ===
The former company CEOs were: Lorenzo Necci (1989–1996), Giancarlo Cimoli (1996–2004), Elio Catania (2004–2006), Mauro Moretti (2006–2014), Michele Mario Elia (2014–2015), Renato Mazzoncini (2015–2018) and Gianfranco Battisti (2018–2021).

== See also ==
- Transport in Italy
- Rail transport in Italy
- Railway network of Sicily
