= List of named passenger trains of Switzerland =

This is a list of named passenger trains in Switzerland, both past and present, including some international ones. Some operate (or operated) under the EuroCity (EC), EuroNight (EN), CityNightLine (CNL), InterCity (IC), InterRegio (IR), RegioExpress (RE), S-Bahn (S) or Panorama Express (PE) categories.

Train or service name	Operator(s)	Route	Operation	Notes
AB-Klassiker	AB	Appenzell – Wasserauen	present	Suspended as of 2026
Aqualino	RhB	Scuol-Tarasp – Chur – Disentis/Muster	present	
Bernina Express (PE)	RhB	Chur – St. Moritz – Tirano	1973–present	
CNL Apus	CNL	Amsterdam (Centraal) – Bellinzona – Milan (Central)	until 2016	
CNL Aurora	CNL	Zurich (Hauptbahnhof) – Copenhagen (Central)	until 2014	
CNL Berliner	CNL	Zurich (Hauptbahnhof) – Berlin (Hauptbahnhof)	defunct	
CNL Canopus	CNL	Zurich (Hauptbahnhof) – Prague (Central)	until 2016	
CNL Komet	CNL	Zurich (Hauptbahnhof) – Hamburg (Hauptbahnhof)	1954–2016	
CNL Orion	CNL	Basel – Dresden (Hauptbahnhof) – Prague (Main)	until 2014	
CNL Pegasus	CNL	Amsterdam (Centraal) – Zurich (Hauptbahnhof) – Brig	until 2016	
CNL Semper	CNL	Zurich (Hauptbahnhof) – Dresden (Hauptbahnhof)	defunct	
Chocolat Express	TPF	Bern – Fribourg/Freiburg – Romont FR – Bulle – La Tour-de-Trême – Broc-Village – Broc-Chocolaterie	present	
EC Borromeo	Cisalpino	Basel – Bern (Main) – Milan (Central)	until 2009	
EC Canaletto	Cisalpino	Zurich (Hauptbahnhof) – Venice (Santa Lucia)	until 2009	
EC Cinque Terre	Cisalpino	Zurich (Hauptbahnhof) – La Spezia	until 2009	
EC Iris	SNCB, CFL, SNCF, SBB CFF FFS	Brussels (Midi/Zuid) – Strasbourg – Chur	present	
EC Jean Monet	SNCB, CFL, SNCF	Brussels (Midi/Zuid) – Strasbourg – Basel	present	
EC Kaiserin Elisabeth	SBB CFF FFS, ÖBB	Zurich (Hauptbahnhof) – Salzburg	present	
EC Lemano	Cisalpino	Geneva – Milan (Central)	until 2009	
EC Maria Theresia	SBB CFF FFS, ÖBB	Zurich (Hauptbahnhof) – Vienna (Westbahnhof)	present	
EC Monte Rosa	Cisalpino	Geneva – Milan (Central)	until 2009	
EC Ticino	SBB CFF FFS, FS/Trenitalia, Cisalpino	Basel – Lucerne – Milan (Central)	1993–2008	
EC Transalpin	SBB CFF FFS, ÖBB	Basel – Vienna (Westbahnhof)	1958–2010	
EC Transalpin	SBB CFF FFS, ÖBB	Zurich (Hauptbahnhof) – Graz (Hauptbahnhof)	2013–present	
EC Vall D’Ossola	Cisalpino	Basel – Bern (Main) – Milan (Central)	until 2009	
EC Vallese	Cisalpino	Geneva – Milan (Central)	until 2009	
EC Vauban	SNCB, CFL, SNCF, SBB CFF FFS	Brussels (Midi/Zuid) – Strasbourg – Brig	present	
EC Verbano	Cisalpino	Basel – Bern (Main) – Milan (Central)	until 2009	
EN Roma	SBB CFF FFS, Trenitalia	Zurich (Hauptbahnhof) – Venice (Santa Lucia); Zurich (Hauptbahnhof) – Rome (Termini)	present	
EN Wiener Walzer	SBB CFF FFS, ÖBB, MÁV	Zurich (Hauptbahnhof) – Prague (Main); Zurich (Hauptbahnhof) – Vienna (Westbahnhof) – Budapest (Keleti)	present	
EN Zürichsee	SBB CFF FFS, ÖBB, SŽ, HŽ, ŽS	Zurich (Hauptbahnhof) – Ljubljana (Main) – Zagreb – Beograd	present	
Engadin Star	RhB	Landquart – St. Moritz	present	
Glacier Express (PE)	MGB, RhB	Zermatt – St. Moritz	present	
Glarner Sprinter	SBB CFF FFS	Zurich (Hauptbahnhof) – Linthal	2004–2014	
GoldenPass Line / GoldenPass Express (PE)	Zentralbahn, BLS, Montreux–Lenk im Simmental line	Lucerne – Interlaken – Zweisimmen – Montreux	present	
Gotthard Panorama Express (PE)	SBB CFF FFS, SGV (Note: Boat operator)	(Lucerne by boat to) Flüelen – Bellinzona – Lugano	2017–present	
Heidiland-Bernina Express	RhB	Chur – St. Moritz – Tirano	1995–present	Ran under this name between 1995 and 1999, then 1999–2005 as Heidi-Express, since 2005 it also operates as Bernina Express
IC Brianza	Cisalpino	Bellinzona – Milan (Central)	until 2009	
IC Insubria	SBB CFF FFS, Trenitalia	Stuttgart (Hauptbahnhof) – Zurich (Hauptbahnhof) – Milan (Central)	present	
IC Mediolanum	SBB CFF FFS, Trenitalia	Basel – Lucerne – Milan (Central)	present	
IC Monte Ceneri	Cisalpino	Zurich (Hauptbahnhof) – Milan (Central)	until 2009	
IC Riviera dei Fiori	Cisalpino	Basel – Lucerne – Genova – Nice	until 2009	
IC Teodolina	Cisalpino	Zurich (Hauptbahnhof) – Milan (Central)	until 2009	
IC Tiziano	SBB CFF FFS, Trenitalia	Basel – Lucerne – Milan (Central)	present	
IC Verdi	SBB CFF FFS, Trenitalia	Basel – Lucerne – Milan (Central)	present	
IR Aare Linth	SOB, SBB CFF FFS	Chur – Zurich (Hauptbahnhof) – Bern	2021–present	Runs as IR35
IR Alpenrhein Express	SOB	Chur – St. Gallen	2024–present	Runs as IR13
IR Treno Gottardo	SOB, SBB CFF FFS	Locarno – Airolo – Göschenen – Arth-Goldau – Zurich (Hauptbahnhof) or Basel (SBB)	2020–present	Runs as IR 26 to/from Basel, and as IR 46 to/from Zurich. Operates through the Gotthard crest tunnel
IR Voralpen Express (VAE)	SOB (until 2013 in collaboration with SBB CFF FFS)	Lucerne – Rapperswil – St. Gallen ( – Romanshorn, until 2013)	1992–present	
RE Lötschberger	BLS	Bern – Thun – Spiez – Kandersteg – Goppenstein (Lötschental) – Brig	present	Since December 2022 not operated by BLS RABe 535 stock made for this service, but instead Stadler Mika are used
Rheingold		Basel – Hook of Holland	1934–1987	
Rheintal Express	SBB CFF FFS	St. Gallen – Chur	1995–2018	
Rhyhas (S62)	SBB GmbH	Schaffhausen – Singen (– Radolfzell)	2022–present	
Seehas (S6)	SBB GmbH	Konstanz – Radolfzell – Singen (Hohentwiel) – Engen	1994–present	Operated by SBB GmbH but running in Germany
TEE Gottardo	SBB CFF FFS, FS	Zurich – Milan (Central)	1961–1988	
TEE Ticino	SBB CFF FFS	Zurich – Milan (Central)	1961–1974	
Train des Vignes	SBB CFF FFS	Vevey – Puidoux-Chexbres	present	Since 2010 around that year, the service is not branded anymore and is intergrated in RER Vaud as R7.
Train du Chocolat	MOB	Montreux – Gruyères – Broc	present	
Train Fondue	TPF	(Gstaad) – Montbovon – Bulle	present	
Trenhotel Pau Casals	Elipsos	Zurich (Hauptbahnhof) – Barcelona (Estació de França)	2001–2012	
Trenino della Neve	RhB	St. Moritz – Tirano	present	
Wilhelm-Tell-Express	SBB CFF FFS, SGV	(Lucerne by boat to) Flüelen – Bellinzona – Lugano	until 2017	

== See also ==
- List of named passenger trains of Europe
- Train categories in Europe
