= List of named passenger trains of Italy =

This article contains lists of named passenger trains in Italy.

Train Name	Railroad	Train Endpoints	Operated
TEE Ambrosiano	Ferrovie dello Stato	Milan (Central) – Rome (Termini)	1974–1987
Bernina Express	RhB	Tirano – St. Moritz – Chur	present
Brenner Express	Trenitalia, ÖBB, DB	Florence (Firenze Santa Maria Novella) – Munich (Hauptbahnhof); Venice (Santa Lucia) – Munich (Hauptbahnhof)	present
Capri	Trenitalia, ÖBB, DB	Naples – Munich (Hauptbahnhof)	present
Caravaggio	Trenitalia, SNCF	Milan (Central) – Turin – Paris (Lyon)	present
Casanova	Trenitalia, SŽ	Venice (Santa Lucia) – Ljubljana (Main)	2001–2008
Conca d'Oro	Trenitalia	Milan (Central) – Palermo	present
Don Giovanni	ČD, ÖBB, Trenitalia	Venice (Santa Lucia) – Vienna (Westbahnhof) – Prague (Main)	present
Dumas	Trenitalia, SNCF	Milan (Central) – Turin – Paris (Lyon)	present
EC Borromeo	Cisalpino	Milan (Central) – Bern (Main) – Basel	present
EC Canaletto	Cisalpino	Venice (Santa Lucia) – Zurich (Hauptbahnhof)	present
EC Cinque Terre	Cisalpino	La Spezia – Zurich (Hauptbahnhof)	present
EC Lemano	Cisalpino	Milan (Central) – Geneva	present
EC Mediolanum	Cisalpino	Milan (Central) – Basel (SBB station)	2004–present
EC Monte Rosa	Cisalpino	Milan (Central) – Geneva	present
EC Verbano	Cisalpino	Milan (Central) – Bern (Main) – Basel	present
EC Vall D’Ossola	Cisalpino	Milan (Central) – Bern (Main) – Basel	present
EC Vallese	Cisalpino	Milan (Central) – Geneva	present
EN Roma	Trenitalia, SBB-CFF-FFS	Venice (Santa Lucia) – Zurich (Hauptbahnhof); Rome (Termini) – Zurich (Hauptbahnhof)	present
Freccia del Sud	Trenitalia	Milan – Syracuse – Agrigento	present
Garda	Trenitalia, ÖBB, DB	Verona – Munich	present
Giacomo Puccini	Trenitalia, ÖBB	Ancona – Vienna (Südbahnhof)	present
Goldoni	Trenitalia, SŽ, HŽ, MÁV	Venice (Santa Lucia) – Ljubljana (Main) – Zagreb – Budapest (Nyugati)	present
Gottardo	SBB-CFF-FFS, FS/Trenitalia, Cisalpino	Milan (Central) – Zurich (Hauptbahnhof)	1961–2008
Heidi Express	RhB	Tirano – St. Moritz – Chur	present
IC Brianza	Cisalpino	Milan (Central) – Bellinzona	present
IC Insubria	Trenitalia, SBB-CFF-FFS	Milan (Central) – Zurich (Hauptbahnhof) – Stuttgart (Hauptbahnhof)	present
IC Mediolanum	Trenitalia, SBB-CFF-FFS	Milan (Central) – Lucerne (Main) – Basel	2001–2004
IC Monte Ceneri	Trenitalia, SBB-CFF-FFS	Milan (Central) – Zurich (Hauptbahnhof)	present
IC Riviera dei Fiori	Trenitalia, SBB-CFF-FFS	Basel – Lucerne – Genoa – Nice	present
IC Teodolina	Trenitalia, SBB-CFF-FFS	Milan (Central) – Zurich (Hauptbahnhof)	present
IC Ticino	Trenitalia, SBB-CFF-FFS	Milan (Central) – Lucerne (Main) – Basel	present
IC Tiziano	Trenitalia, SBB-CFF-FFS	Milan (Central) – Lucerne (Main) – Basel	present
IC Verdi	Trenitalia, SBB-CFF-FFS	Milan (Central) – Lucerne (Main) – Basel	present
Italicus	Trenitalia	Rome (Termini) – Munich (Hauptbahnhof)	discontinued in 1974 after a terrorist attack
Johann Strauss	Trenitalia, ÖBB	Venice (Santa Lucia) – Vienna (Westbahnhof)	present
Leonardo da Vinci	Trenitalia, ÖBB, DB	Milan (Central) – Munich (Hauptbahnhof)	present
Ligure	FS/Trenitalia, SNCF	Milan (Central) – Nice – Avignon	1957–2009
Manzoni	Trenitalia, SNCF	Milan (Central) – Turin – Paris (Lyon)	present
TEE/IC Mediolanum	FS, ÖBB, DB	Milan (Central) – Munich (Hauptbahnhof)	1957–1987
Michelangelo	Trenitalia, ÖBB, DB	Rome (Termini) – Munich (Hauptbahnhof)	present
Montecarlo	Trenitalia, SNCF	Naples – Nice	present
Paganini	Trenitalia, ÖBB, DB	Verona – Munich (Hauptbahnhof)	present
Palatino Express	Trenitalia, SNCF	Rome (Termini) – Florence (Firenze Santa Maria Novella) – Bologna (Central) – Paris (Lyon)	Discontinued in December 2011
San Marco	Trenitalia, ÖBB	Venice (Santa Lucia) – Vienna (Westbahnhof)	present
Sanremo	Trenitalia, SNCF	Milan (Central) – Nice	present
Settebello	FS	Milan (Central) – Rome (Termini)	1953–1984
Stendhal	Trenitalia, SNCF	Venice (Santa Lucia) – Milan (Central) – Paris (Lyon)	present
Stradivari	Trenitalia, ÖBB	Venice (Santa Lucia) – Vienna (Westbahnhof)	present
Tacito	Trenitalia	Terni – Milan (Central)	present
Tiepolo	Trenitalia, ÖBB, DB	Florence (Firenze Santa Maria Novella) – Munich (Hauptbahnhof); Venice (Santa Lucia) – Munich (Hauptbahnhof)	present
Tosca	Trenitalia, ÖBB	Rome (Termini) – Vienna (Westbahnhof)	present
Trenino della neve	RhB	Tirano – St. Moritz	present
Trenino Verde	(tourist train)	Mandas – Arbatax	end of 19th century – present
Val Gardena	Trenitalia, ÖBB, DB	Bolzano – Munich (Hauptbahnhof)	present
Venezia	Trenitalia, SŽ, HŽ, MÁV, CFR	Venice (Santa Lucia) – Ljubljana (Main) – Zagreb – Budapest (Nyugati) – Bucharest (Gara de Nord)	present
