= SBB RAe TEE II =

Swiss electric trainset

SBB RAe TEE ^{II} SBB RABe EC
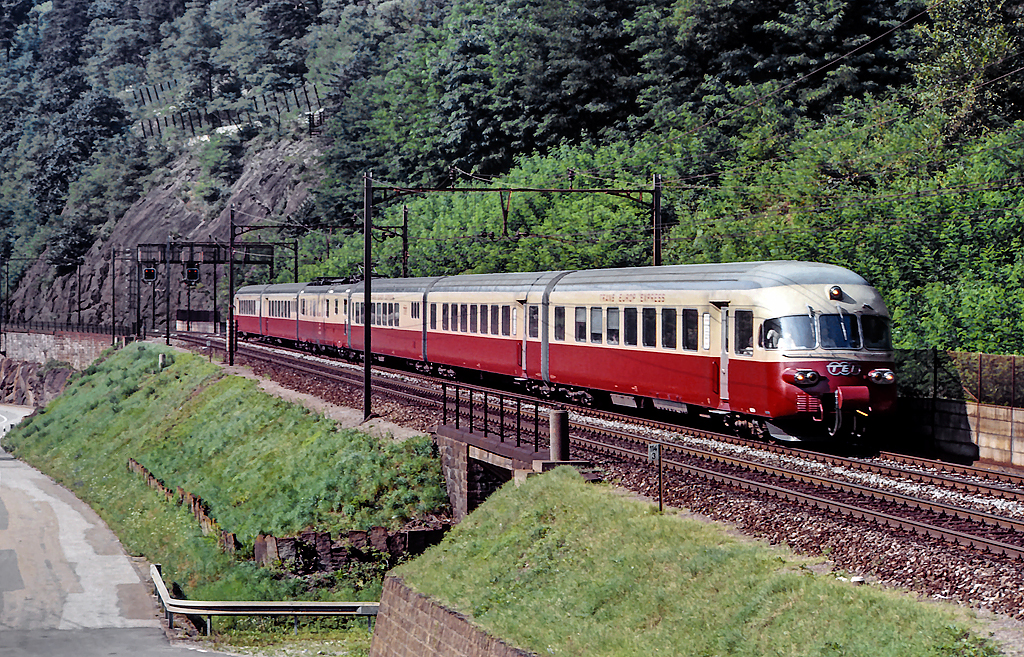
- RAe No. 1051 with TEE 57 Gottardo near Lavorgo, Switzerland, 18 August 1988
- In service: 1961–1999
- Manufacturers: SIG; MFO
- Constructed: 1961 (1051–1054); 1966 (lengthened); 1967 (1055)
- Number built: 5
- Number in service: 0
- Number preserved: 1
- Formation: as built: At-Re-WR-A-At; later: At-A-Re-WR-A-At
- Fleet numbers: 1051–1055
- Capacity: TEE: 126 (later 168) first, 56 dining; EC: 84 first, 108 second, 39 dining
- Operator: Swiss Federal Railways

Specifications
- Train length: 5-car: 125.334 m (411 ft 2 3/8 in); 6-car: 149.760 m (491 ft 4 1/8 in)
- Width: 2,840 mm (9 ft 3 3/4 in)
- Height: 4,210 mm (13 ft 9 3/4 in)
- Wheel diameter: Powered: 1,110 mm (43 3/4 in); Unpowered: 940 mm (37 in)
- Maximum speed: 160 km/h (99 mph)
- Weight: 5-car: 259 tonnes (255 long tons; 285 short tons); 6-car: 309 tonnes (304 long tons; 341 short tons)
- Traction motors: Four
- Power output: Continuous: 2,310 kW (3,100 hp)
- Tractive effort: 15 kV: 81.6 kN (18,300 lbf); Others: 79.8 kN (17,900 lbf)
- Electric systems: 1500 V DC; 3000 V DC; 15 kV 16.7 Hz AC; 25 kV 50 Hz AC
- Current collection: Overhead lines via pantograph
- UIC classification: 2′2′+[2′2′+](A1A)(A1A)+2′2′+2′2′+2′2′
- Track gauge: 1,435 mm (4 ft 8 1/2 in)

The RAe TEE II, later known as RABe EC, is a type of high-speed electric multiple unit trainset of the Swiss Federal Railways (SBB), which was used from the 1960s until the 1980s on several Trans Europ Express services. After conversion from first-class-only to two-class configuration, the trainsets continued in use on EuroCity or other services until 1999.

It was designed to be compatible with four different railway electrification systems (different voltages in the overhead lines), used by various countries in Europe, allowing it to operate on long international routes. Like all TEE trains, the RAe TEE II trainsets were equipped with first-class accommodation only. A total of five trainsets were built, numbered 1051–1055. One, number 1053, has been preserved.

== Operation ==
=== Trans Europ Express ===
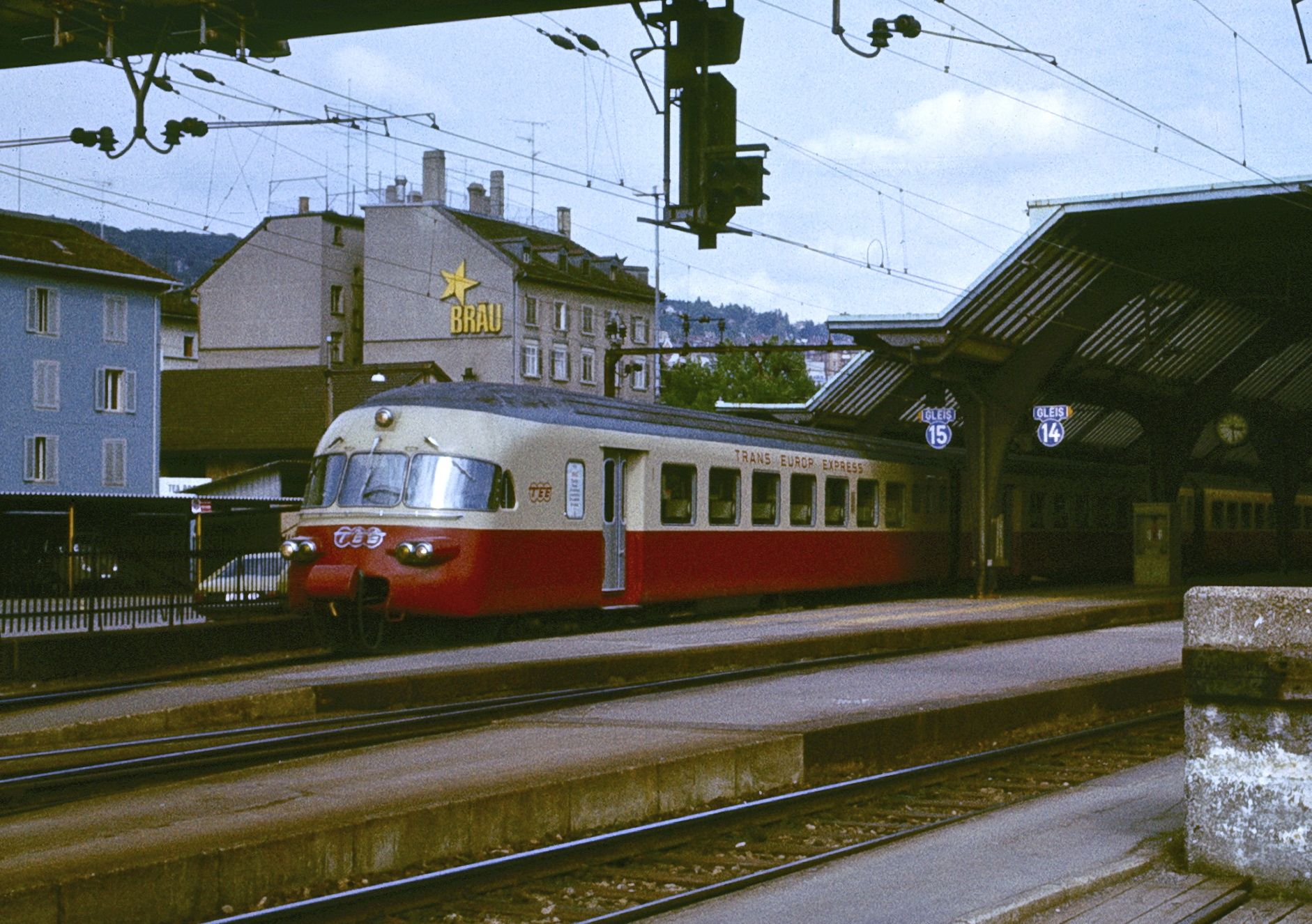
An RAe TEE II set running as the Trans Europ Express Iris in 1979, seen departing Zürich for Brussels

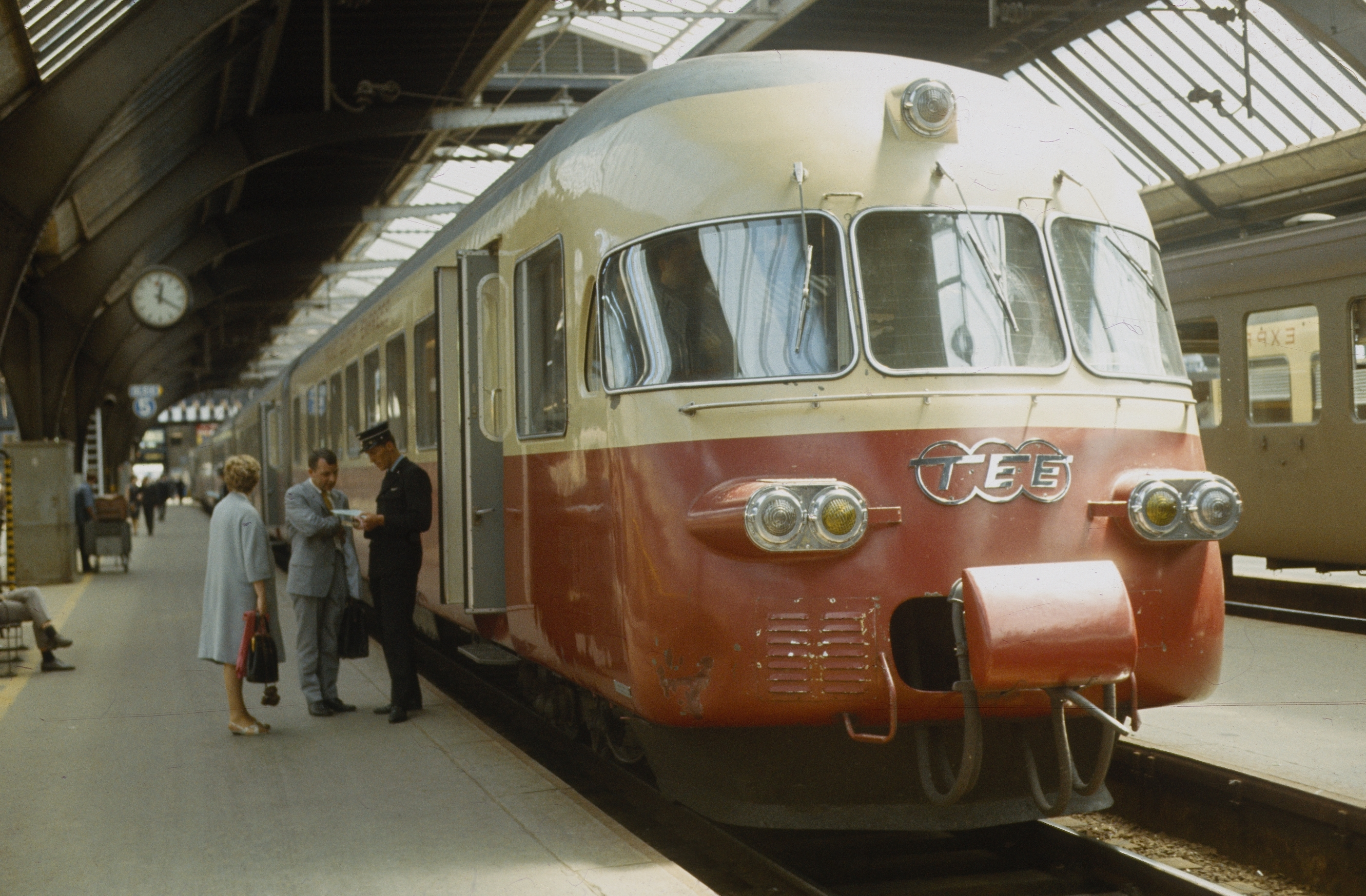
At Zürich Hauptbahnhof, 1983

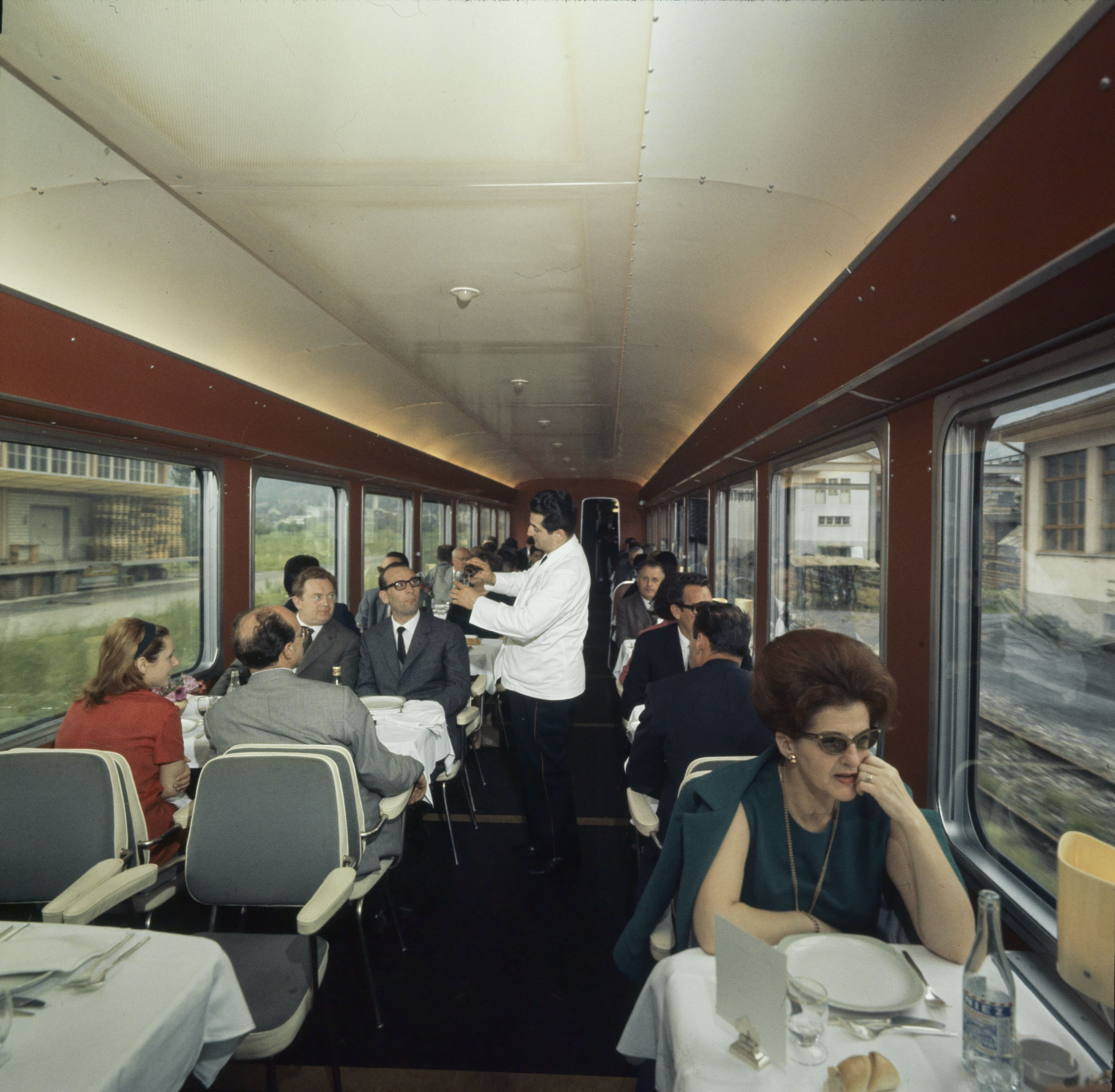
Dining car in 1963

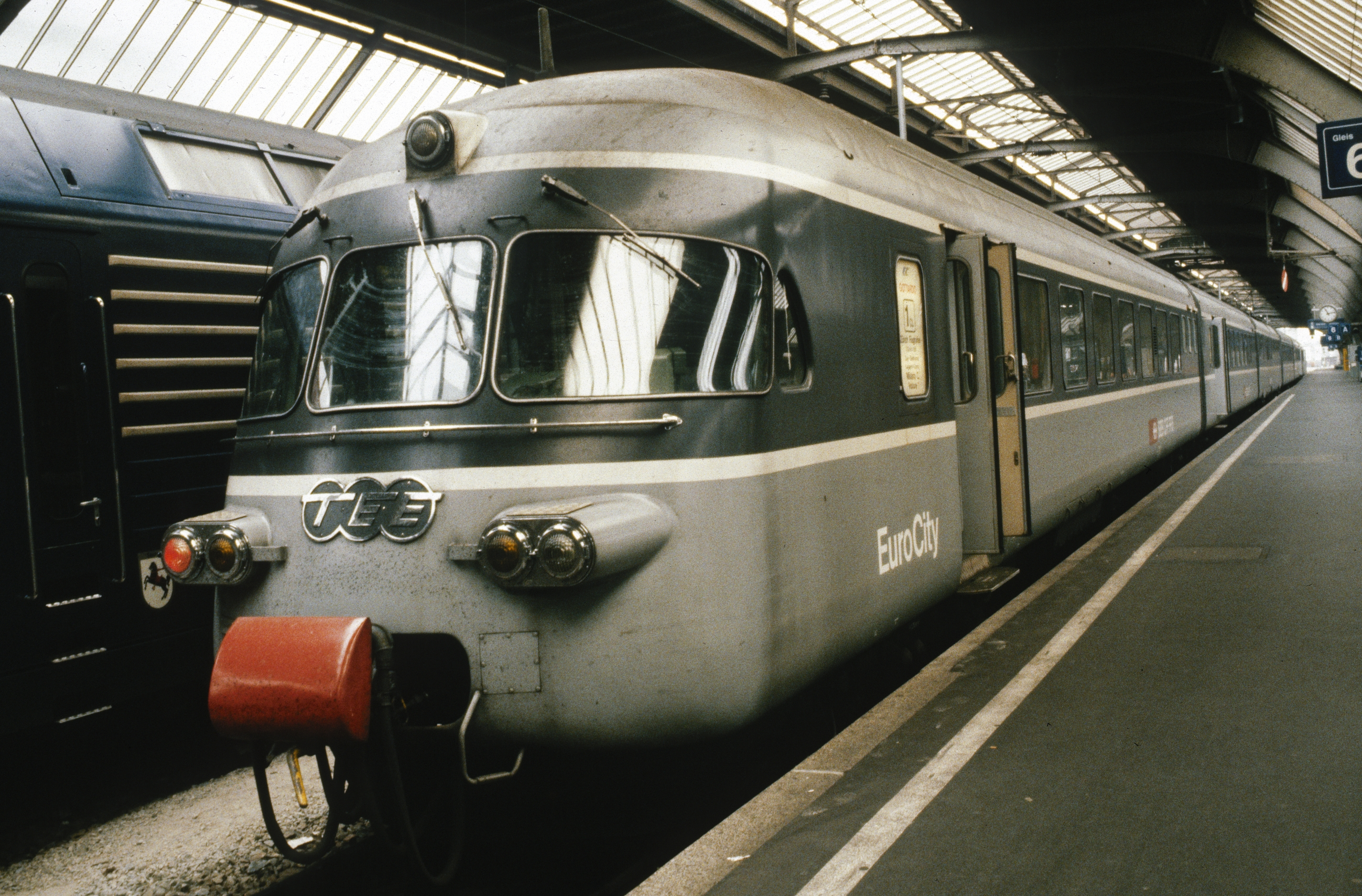
An RABe EC in Zürich in 1992, after being taken out of TEE service (in 1988), converted to two-class and repainted grey. Although no longer a TEE, it still has its TEE badge on the front.

These trains were originally used on the following services:

- TEE Gottardo, Zürich – Milano
- TEE Cisalpin, Milano – Paris
- TEE Ticino, Milano – Zürich

The trains ran in a 4-day circulation:

1. Gottardo, Zürich – Milano, and Cisalpin, Milano – Paris
2. Cisalpin, Paris – Milano
3. Ticino, Milano – Zürich – Milano, and Gottardo, Milano – Zürich
4. layover in Zurich

From 30 May 1965, the southbound Gottardo started from Basel, but nevertheless the northbound train still terminated in Zürich. This led to an empty run (every fourth day for any given trainset) from Zürich to Basel. From 30 September 1979, this section was only served on weekdays, and on 23 May 1982 it was withdrawn entirely. During the summers of 1974–1979 the Gottardo was extended from Milano to Genova (in both directions).

In 1974, the Cisalpin was converted to a locomotive-hauled train and the Ticino was discontinued, freeing up RAe sets for the following two TEE trains:

- TEE Edelweiss, Zürich – Brussels – Amsterdam
- TEE Iris, Zürich – Brussels

The last TEE Edelweiss ran on 26 May 1979, and the TEE Iris on 30 May 1981. The last international TEE until 1993—and the last TEE anywhere to use RAe TEE II trainsets—was the Gottardo, which ran as a Trans Europ Express for the very last time on 24 September 1988, from Milano to Zürich.

=== EuroCity and post-EC use ===
After their use on TEE services ended, the RAe TEE II sets were converted in 1988–90 to two-class trains, redesignated type RABe EC, repainted from red-and-cream to two-tone grey, and put into use on EuroCity services from Zürich to Milano (the EC Gottardo and EC Manzoni) and Geneva or Lausanne to Milano (the EC Cisalpin, EC Lemano, and EC Lutetia), as well as in non-EC service between Bern and Frasne, France. Their new livery earned them the nickname "souris gris" (or "graue Maus" in German), meaning "grey mouse". In May 1993, the RABe sets were taken off of the Simplon railway line service (Lausanne to Milano) and the freed-up trainsets redeployed on a then-new Zürich to Stuttgart service (the EC Killesberg and EC Uetliberg).

The RABe sets were removed from EuroCity service in August 1994, after the derailment of one set on 22 July 1994 – initially an indefinite suspension of their use any services, which was later made a permanent withdrawal from use on EC services. Thereafter, they were employed only on two pairs of daily IC trains operating between Bern and Frasne, which was continuing in early 1996. The last three active sets were retired from regular service altogether in November 1999.

== Preservation ==
One of the five RAe TEE II trainsets, No. 1053, has been preserved, and in 2003 it was restored by the SBB Historic foundation to red-and-cream TEE livery. In 2012–13, it received updates to allow it to continue to be operated. Its interior configuration remained unchanged from its circa 1989 conversion to RABe class.

== See also ==
- Swiss locomotive and railcar classification
- TEE carriages of FS

== Other sources ==
This article uses material from German Wikipedia.

- Louis-Henri Leyvraz: Die Vierstrom-Triebzüge RAe-TEE II 1051–1055 der SBB. In: Schweizer Eisenbahn Revue. 06/1988. Minirex AG, S. 207 (8 Seiten, 12 Abbildungen), ISSN 1022-7113
- Maurice Mertens: Les Trans Europ Express (Seconde edition). La Vie du Rail, Paris 1987, ISBN 2-902808-21-6
- Maurice Mertens: Trans Europ Express. Alba-Verlag, Düsseldorf 1987, ISBN 3-87094-114-6
- Hans-Bernhard Schönborn: Die TEE-Züge der Schweiz. Luxuszüge für Europa. GeraMond, München 2002, ISBN 3-7654-7122-4
- Christian Zellweger: TEE – Ikone der Luxuszüge. AS Verlag, Zürich 2003, ISBN 3-905111-95-0
