= Ticino (train) =

Train

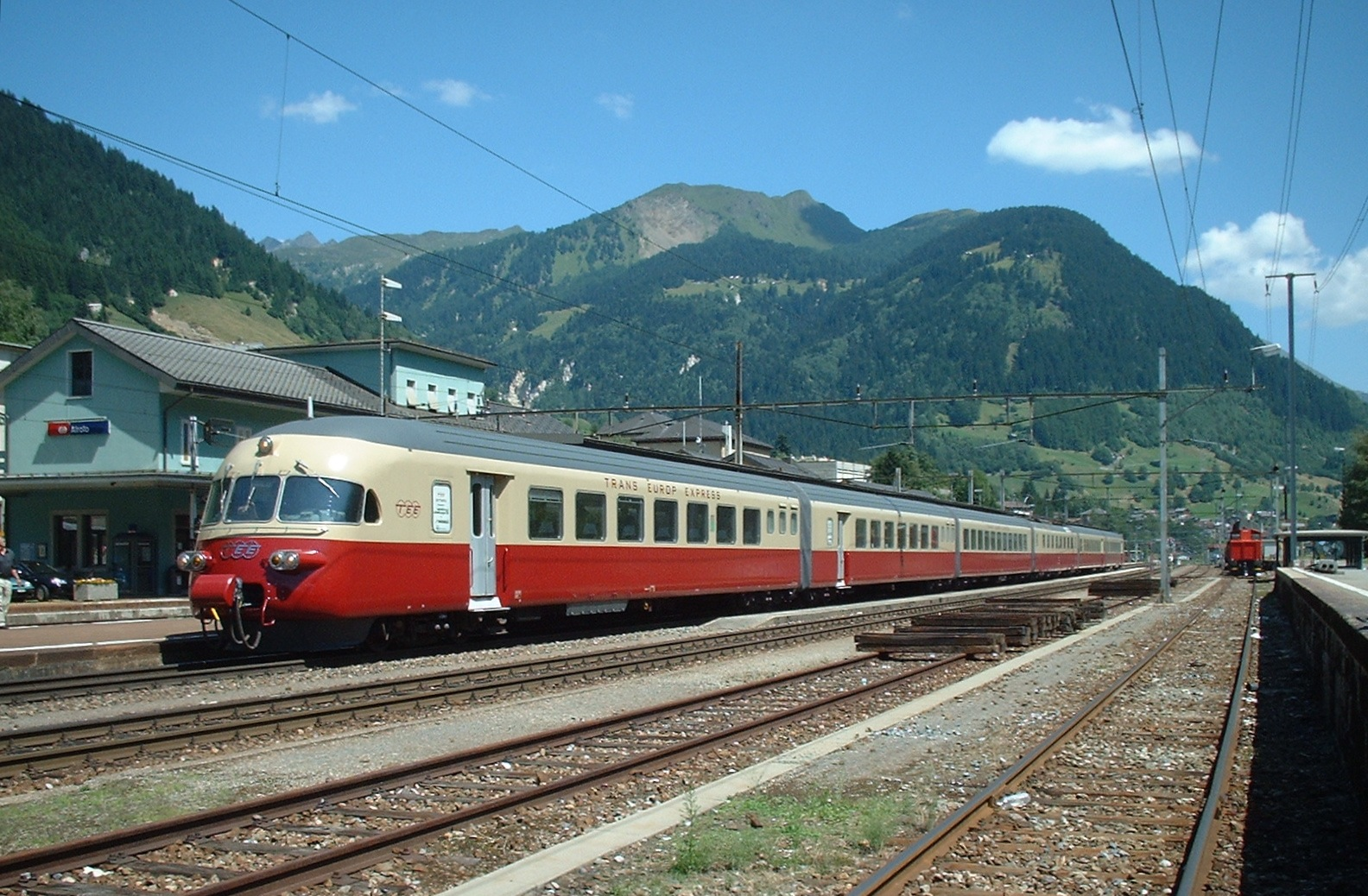
- A preserved RAe TEE trainset in Airolo (Ticino), 2003

Overview
- Service type: Trans Europ Express (TEE) (1961–1974); D-Zug (1974–1982); EuroCity (EC) (1993–2008)
- Locale: Switzerland; Italy; Germany
- First service: 1 July 1961
- Last service: 2008
- Former operator(s): Swiss Federal Railways; Cisalpino

Route
- Termini: Milan; Zürich / Munich (1974–1982)
- Distance travelled: 293 km
- Service frequency: Daily

Technical
- Rolling stock: RAe TEE
- Track gauge: 1,435 mm (4 ft 8 1/2 in)
- Electrification: 3000 V DC (Italy); 15 kV AC, 16.7 Hz (Switzerland and Germany)
Route map
- Route of the TEE Ticino 1961–1982 and 1993–2001 (not showing the Zurich–Munich section, served 1974–1982)

The Ticino was an express train that linked Milan in Italy, with Zürich, Switzerland and for some years even to Munich, Germany. The train was named after the Canton of Ticino in the south of Switzerland. Introduced in 1961, it was a first-class-only Trans Europ Express (TEE) service until 1974. Later, it was a EuroCity service.

== Trans Europ Express ==
When launched on 1 July 1961, the Ticino was one of three Trans Europ Express services that filled a gap between the northern and southern parts of the TEE network.

=== Rolling stock ===
The TEE Ticino, TEE Gottardo and TEE Cisalpin were the first electric TEE trains; all other TEEs in operation at that time used diesel-powered trains. These services through Switzerland were operated by Swiss Federal Railways (SBB-CFF-FFS) with purpose-built Swiss quadruple-voltage RAe TEE II trainsets. Each trainset worked a four-day schedule:

- Day 1: Zürich – Milan (TEE Gottardo) in the morning and Milan – Paris (TEE Cisalpin) in the afternoon.
- Day 2: Paris – Milan (TEE Cisalpin) in the afternoon.
- Day 3: Milan – Zürich (TEE Ticino) in the morning, Zürich – Milan (TEE Ticino) in the afternoon and Milan – Zürich (TEE Gottardo) in the evening.
- Day 4: Maintenance.

=== Schedule and operation ===
The Ticino was designated as MZ1 and ZM4 in the timetable of 1961. The train's only stop in Ticino was the city of Lugano; the Swiss–Italian border just north of Como was crossed without stopping. This was made possible with the semi-automated voltage and frequency change system, which lowered the train's pantograph for the change of the electrical system. The train operator pressed a button for the Italian or Swiss electrical system after passing the border and an on-board switcher reconfigured the train's power settings for the different overhead line voltage and raised the correct pantograph. With the European train-numbering system, introduced in 1971, the Ticino was given the train numbers 56 and 57.

Timetable of 1971/72:

TEE 57	country	station	km	TEE 56
12:40	Switzerland	Zürich	0	12:15
15:30	Switzerland	Lugano	216	09:17
16:55	Italy	Como	247	09:49
17:29	Italy	Milano Centrale	293	09:15

These times are shown in local time, but at that time, Switzerland was in the Central European time zone and Italy in the Eastern European time zone, which differed by one hour. The actual travel time between Lugano and Como was 25 minutes.

== D Train ==
Extension of the route to Basel, northwest of Zürich, was proposed several times during the years, but this would have meant the withdrawal of the afternoon service to Milan. In 1974, when the rolling stock was needed for the TEE Edelweiss and the Basel – Milan service provided since 1969 by the TEE Roland, the Ticino was withdrawn from the TEE network, on 25 May 1974. The Ticino was converted into a locomotive-hauled, two-class Schnellzug (express train, or D-train) and the route was extended to Munich, in Germany. This D-train service was discontinued on 22 May 1982.

== EuroCity ==
The Ticino was revived as a EuroCity service on 23 May 1993 on its original route, as train EC 51/56. On 29 May 1995, the Ticino lost its quality label and continued as InterCity service. In 1997, the rolling stock was replaced by FS Class ETR 470 tilting trains operated by Cisalpino. On 10 June 2001, the route was changed to Milan – Basel, and on 11 December 2005 the EuroCity label was regained. The Ticino was discontinued in the fall of 2008.

== Works cited ==
- Werbeamt der DB (1971). Vorfahrt in Europa, TEE 1971/72 (in German). Frankfurt am Main: Deutsche Bundesbahn.
- Centre for publicrelations UIC (1972). TEE (in Dutch). Paris: Union International des Chemins de Fer.
- Zellweger, Christian (2003). Ikone der Luxuszüge (in German). Zürich: SBB Historic, AS Verlag. ISBN 978-3-905111-95-8.
- Mertens, Maurice; Malaspina, Jean-Pierre (2007). La Légende des Trans Europ Express (in French). Vannes: LR Presse. ISBN 978-2-903651-45-9.
