= Vauban (disambiguation) =

Vauban may refer to:

- Sébastien Le Prestre, Seigneur de Vauban, a French military engineer
- A list of Vauban's fortifications
- Vauban (train), an express train linking Belgium and Switzerland
- Vauban, Freiburg, a neighbourhood of Freiburg, Germany
- Lycée Vauban (Luxembourg), a secondary school in Luxembourg
- Vauban, Saône-et-Loire, a commune in the Saône-et-Loire département
- SS Vauban, a Lamport & Holt Line steamship (built 1912)
