= Gottardo (train) =

Historical express train

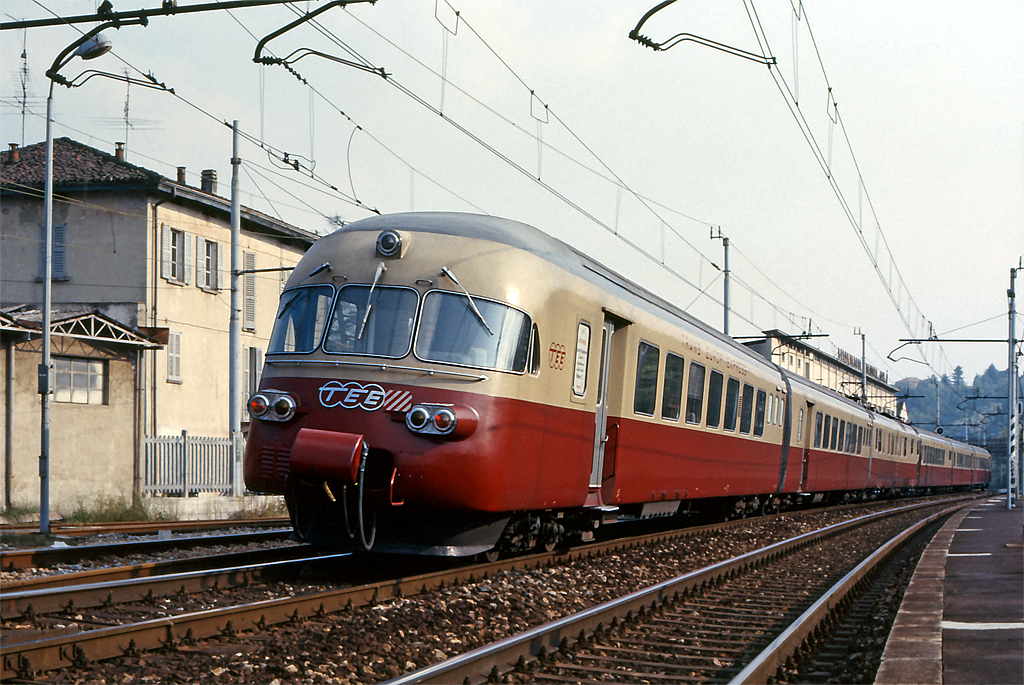
- TEE Gottardo passing through Cantù-Cermenate station, on the Milan–Chiasso line, in 1988

Overview
- Service type: Trans Europ Express (TEE) (1961–88); EuroCity (EC) (1988–95); InterCity (IC) (1995–97); EuroNight (EN) (1997–2002)
- Status: Discontinued
- Locale: Switzerland; Italy
- First service: 1 July 1961
- Last service: 15 June 2002
- Former operator(s): SBB-CFF-FFS, Ferrovie dello Stato (FS)

Route
- Termini: Zurich HB; Milano Centrale (Rome after 1997)
- Distance travelled: 293 km (182 mi) (Zürich–Milano)
- Service frequency: Daily

On-board services
- Class(es): 1961–88: First class only 1988–2002: First and second class
- Catering facilities: Restaurant

Technical
- Rolling stock: RAe TEE II-type EMU trainsets (1961–94, but reclassified as RABe EC, with two classes, in 1988/89)
- Track gauge: 1,435 mm (4 ft 8 1/2 in)
- Electrification: 15 kV AC, 16.7 Hz (Basel/Zürich–Chiasso); 3 kV DC (Chiasso–Milano)
Route map
- Route of the TEE Gottardo in summer, 1974–79

The Gottardo was an express train that, for most of its existence, linked Zurich, Switzerland, with Milan, Italy. Introduced in 1961, it was a first-class-only Trans Europ Express (TEE) until 1988, then becoming a EuroCity service and finally a EuroNight service – on a longer route, to Rome – before being discontinued in 2002. The train followed the Gotthard railway and was named for the line, using the Italian spelling for it, Ferrovia del Gottardo.

== History ==
=== Trans Europ Express ===
The Gottardo provided a high-speed, first-class train service between Zürich Hauptbahnhof and Milano Centrale station, starting in 1961. It was operated by the Swiss Federal Railways (SBB-CFF-FFS) and Italian State Railways (FS), and during its years as a TEE service it used the former's RAe TEE II-type electric multiple unit trainsets. These were air-conditioned and the normally six-car train included a restaurant car, operated by the Swiss Restaurant Car Company.

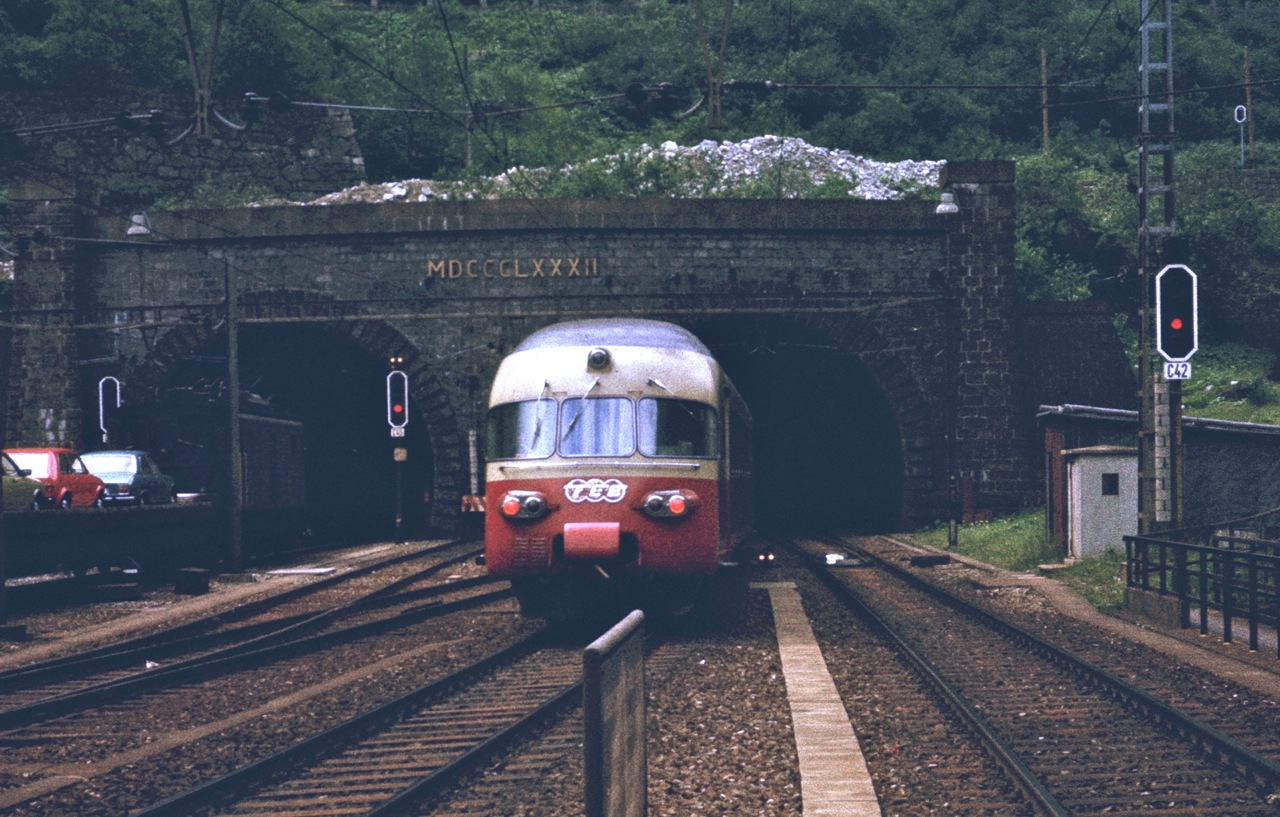
The TEE Gottardo entering the Gotthard Tunnel in 1979

The TEE Gottardo ran southbound in the morning and northbound in the evening, while the TEE Ticino served the same route northbound in the morning and southbound in the afternoon, until the Ticino was discontinued (in 1974). The route via the Gotthard railway was very scenic and included passing through the Gotthard Tunnel. A writer for Fodor's travel guides included the Gottardo and the Ticino, and their shared route, in a list of Europe's most scenic train routes.

In 1965, the route was extended from Zurich to Basel (SBB station). However, in 1969, the northbound route was cut back again to Zurich, and only southbound journeys served Basel, departing from there and travelling to Zurich en route to Milan.

Starting with the 1974 summer timetable period, on 26 May 1974, the Gottardo was extended from Milan to Genoa (Brignole station), but this portion operated only during the summer timetable periods. The train reached Genoa with "just enough turnaround time for the same trainset to make the return journey" back to Zurich the same day. This continued each summer through 1979, but was not repeated in 1980 or after.

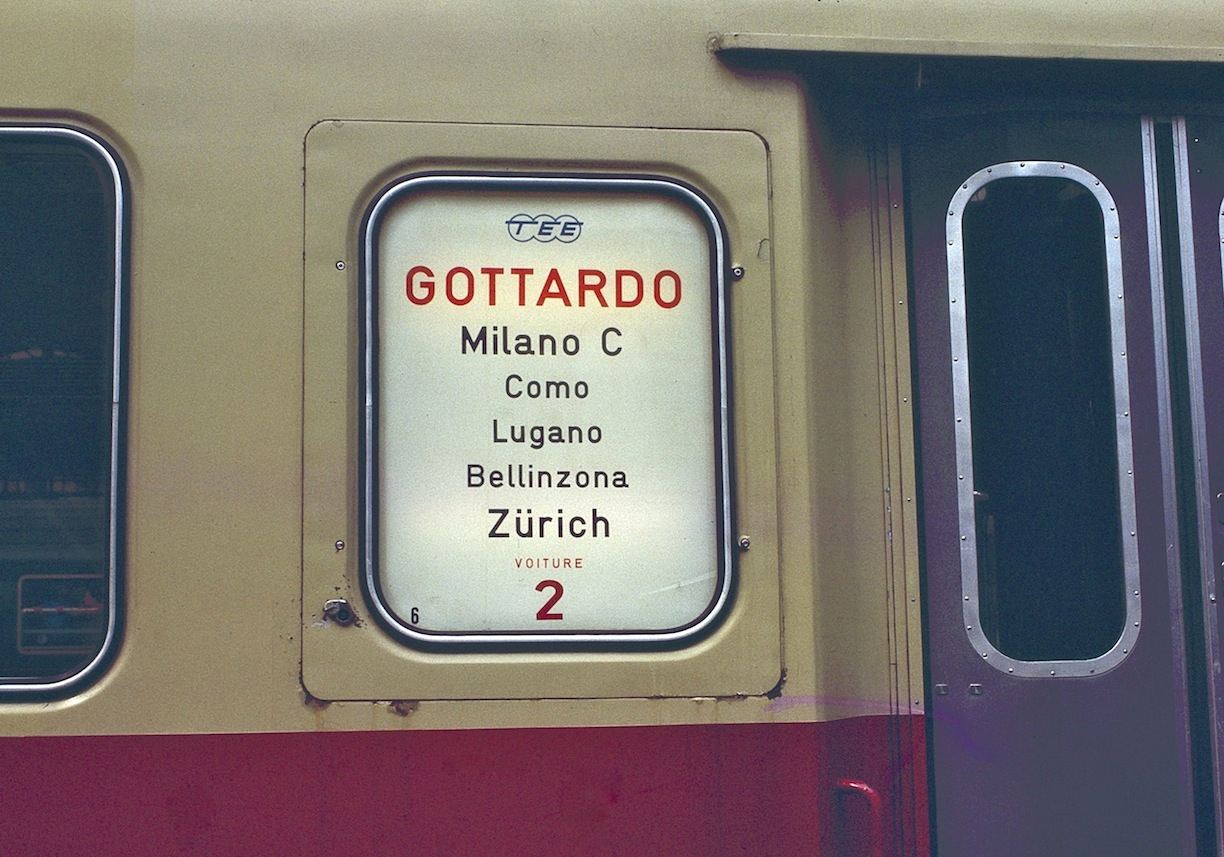
Destination sign in the side of a TEE Gottardo in 1983

The Basel–Zurich portion was made weekdays-only in 1979 and dropped entirely in 1982, making the Gottardo's route once again Zurich–Milano in both directions.

After May 1987, the Gottardo was the only remaining international train in the TEE network, as all other international TEEs were converted to EuroCity (or another type of two-class train) or discontinued effective 31 May 1987. At that time, the southbound Gottardo route was extended a short distance within Zurich to begin at Zürich Flughafen (Zürich Airport) station, but the northbound trips continued to terminate at Zürich HB.

=== Post-TEE ===
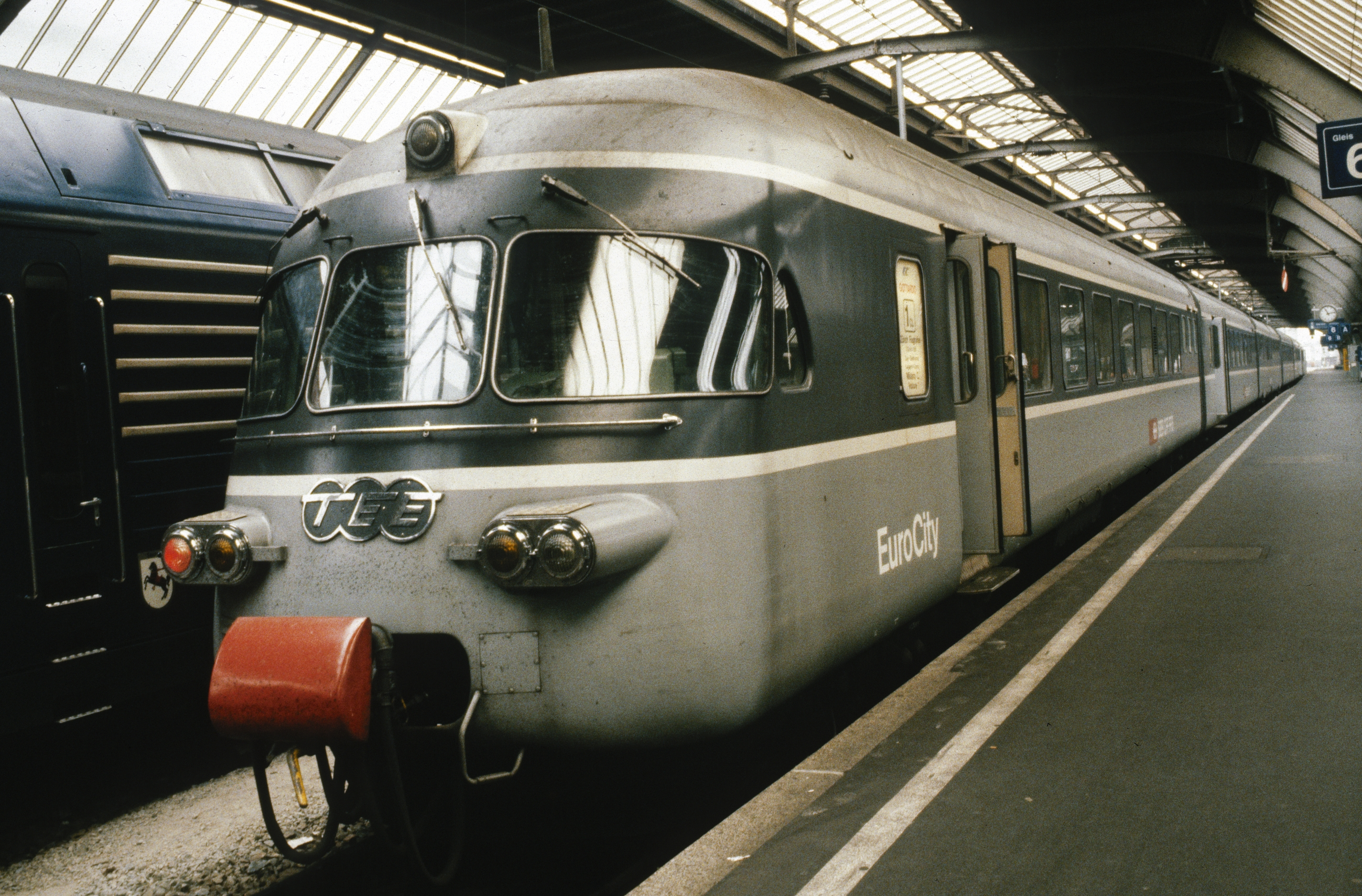
Gottardo in 1992 as a EuroCity train.

On 24 September 1988, the Gottardo was reclassified as a EuroCity train. It was the last international TEE at that time, but lost that distinction some years later, due to a short-lived revival of TEE service between Paris and Brussels from 1993 to 1995.

For the 1988 change from TEE to EuroCity, SBB modified some of the RAe TEE II trainsets to convert some sections from first class to second class. Redesignated RABe-type, these EMUs continued to work the Gottardo after it became a EuroCity service, until being taken off the route in 1994.

By 1990, the southbound route had been extended by 9 km to start in Winterthur, with northbound trips still terminating at Zurich HB, but was cut back again to Zürich Flughafen in June 1991. On 28 May 1995, the train was reclassified as an InterCity (IC).

On 1 June 1997, a major change to the Gottardo, brought on by the introduction of Cisalpino-type high-speed trains on the Gotthard line, saw the IC Gottardo changed to a EuroNight (EN) train running between Zurich and Rome. In June 2002, the EN Gottardo was replaced by a new leg of the EN Roma, running from Zurich and Basel, via Spiez and Brig, to Rome. A previously operating version of the EN Roma joined this new leg in Brig.

== Trainsets ==
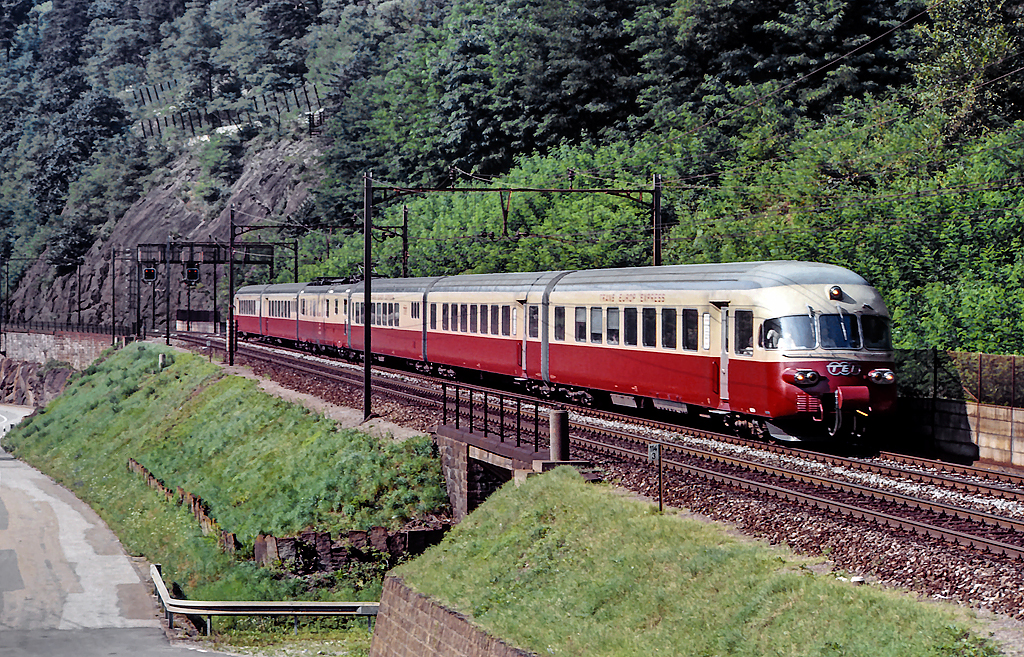
An RAe TEE II trainset in operation as the TEE Gottardo in 1988

The electric multiple unit (EMU) trainsets that were used by the Gottardo from 1961 to 1994, or most of its life, were very unusual in their ability to operate at four different overhead line voltages. The RAe TEE II trainsets were built in 1961 and designed specifically for use on international TEE routes that served countries whose national rail systems used different overhead voltages. On the TEE routes Edelweiss and Iris, the RAe trainsets needed all four power settings; those routes travelled through five countries. The route served by the Gottardo and Ticino served only two countries, but they have different line voltages. The multi-voltage RAe-TEE-type EMUs allowed the two Trans Europ Express trains to cross the Swiss-Italian border at Chiasso without having to stop. All other trains serving the line had to stop at the border station to enable the Swiss locomotive to be replaced by an Italian one, or vice versa, because of the difference in line voltage. After the Ticino was discontinued (in 1971), the Gottardo was the only scheduled passenger train on the Lugano–Como line that did not have to stop at the border station, Chiasso. Border control officers carried out passport inspections on board the moving trains.

== See also ==
- History of rail transport in Italy
- History of rail transport in Switzerland
- List of named passenger trains of Europe
