= Jean Monnet (train) =

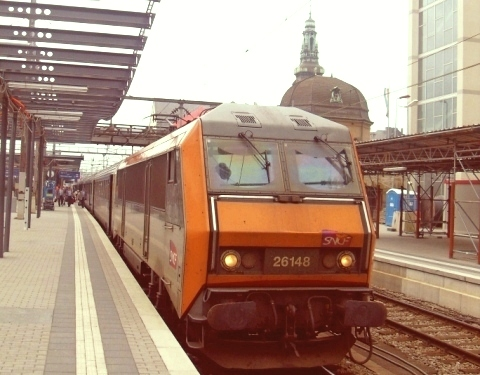
- Jean Monnet at Luxembourg, 2010.

Overview
- Service type: EuroCity (EC)
- Status: Discontinued
- Locale: Belgium; Luxembourg; France; Switzerland
- Predecessor: EC Edelweiss
- First service: 30 May 1999
- Last service: 10 December 2011
- Current operator(s): NMBS/SNCB; CFL; SNCF

Route
- Termini: Brussels Midi/Zuid; Strasbourg-Ville / Bâle SNCF
- Service frequency: Daily
- Train number(s): EC 295/296

Technical
- Track gauge: 1,435 mm (4 ft 8 1/2 in)

The Jean Monnet was an express train that linked Brussels Midi/Zuid in Brussels, Belgium, with Strasbourg-Ville in Strasbourg, France, and later also with Bâle SNCF in Basel, Switzerland. Introduced in 1999, it was operated by the National Railway Company of Belgium (NMBS/SNCB), the Chemins de Fer Luxembourgeois (CFL), and the French National Railway Corporation (SNCF).

The train was named after Jean Monnet (1888–1979), a French political economist and diplomat. One of the founding fathers of the European Union, he is regarded by many as a chief architect of European unity.

== Route ==
The route of the Jean Monnet was as follows:

- Brussels Midi/Zuid – Luxembourg – Strasbourg-Ville (– Bâle SNCF from 2004)

It was particularly appropriate that a train running from Brussels to Strasbourg via Luxembourg be named Jean Monnet, because those three cities are the venues of the main EU institutions.

== History ==
The Jean Monnet first ran on 30 May 1999, as a replacement for the Brussels to Strasbourg section of the EC Edelweiss, which had operated on the same schedule, and with the same train numbers, on that section, and had then continued to Switzerland.

Made up initially of only three coaches, the new train was not a great success until 2004, when it was extended to Basel.

The train's categorisation as a EuroCity was controversial, because it failed to meet two of the criteria for such categorisation: it had no restaurant car, and also too many stops, particularly in Belgium. These issues meant that the Jean Monnet lacked not only the glamour of the earlier Trans Europ Expresses, but also the more modest charms of a EuroCity meeting all of the usual criteria.

The Jean Monnet last ran on 10 December 2011.

== See also ==
- History of rail transport in Belgium
- History of rail transport in France
- History of rail transport in Italy
- History of rail transport in Luxembourg
- History of rail transport in Switzerland
- List of named passenger trains of Europe
