= Lemano (train) =

Overview
- Service type: Trans Europ Express (TEE) (1958–1982); InterCity (1982–1987); EuroCity (1987–1996); Cisalpino (1996–2009)
- Locale: Italy; Switzerland
- First service: 1 June 1958
- Former operator(s): Ferrovie dello Stato; Cisalpino

Route
- Termini: Milan; Geneva
- Distance travelled: 374 km
- Service frequency: Daily
- Line(s) used: Simplon railway

Technical
- Track gauge: 1,435 mm (4 ft 8 1/2 in)
- Electrification: 3 kV DC (Italy); 15 kV 16.7 Hz (Switzerland)

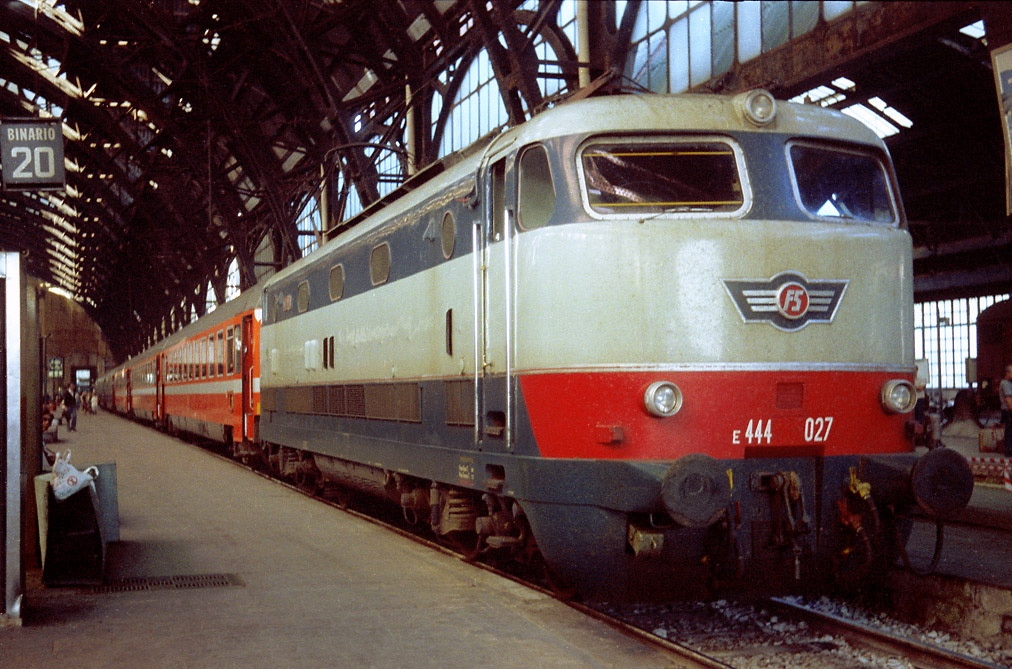
The IC Lemano at Milano Centrale station in 1983

The Lemano was an international express train linking Milan with Geneva. The train is named after Lake Geneva (Lago Lemano in Italian), the north shore of which was followed by the train over the lake's entire length. Introduced in 1958, it was a first-class-only Trans Europ Express service until 1982, and thereafter a two-class express train.

== History ==
The third Italian Trans Europ Express (TEE) service, TEE Lemano, entered service in June 1958, one year after the start of the TEE network. The Italian TEE diesel multiple units (DMUs) of type ALn 442-448 weren't available in time for the launch of the TEE network on 2 June 1957, and consequently, none of the three planned Italian TEE services started at that time. Initially, the departure in Milan was just after nine in the morning, arriving just after lunch in Geneva, around 1:30 p.m. The return service left Geneva before dinner at 5:29 p.m., arriving in Milan around 9:40 p.m. This schedule was designed to allow a traveller to have lunch and dinner while riding along the shores of Lake Geneva and attend a meeting in Geneva during the afternoon. This timetable remained until 1 July 1961, when the TEE Cisalpin entered service. This Paris – Milan service used the Simplon railway as well, and in order to avoid two TEE trains running at nearly the same time from Lausanne to Milan, Lemano's departure from Geneva was postponed to 7:40 p.m. This alteration was not appreciated by the customers because it made the scheduled arrival time in Milan very late in the evening, just before midnight. After two years it was decided to depart from Geneva at 1:30 p.m.; the departure from Milan was moved earlier as well. Returning business travellers could ride from Geneva to Lausanne after the meeting and board the TEE Cisalpin to Milan calling at around 6 p.m. On 28 May 1972, the DMUs were replaced by Gran Conforto coaches built by FIAT and hauled by electric locomotives. Despite attempts to improve the schedule, passenger numbers never reached a level as high as in the first three years, and eventually the Lemano was downgraded to a two-class InterCity service, on 23 May 1982.

On 22 January 1984, the TGV-service Lausanne – Paris started, and the Paris – Milan services were split in two. The TGVs ran between Paris and Lausanne, and connecting InterCity trains using the same names ran between Lausanne and Milan. One of these split services was named Lemano. After the introduction of the EuroCity network, on 31 May 1987, the names remained unchanged. In 1989, the rolling stock on the Lausanne – Milan portion was replaced by Swiss RABe quadruple-voltage trainsets, which later on were replaced by Italian ETR470 tilting trains.

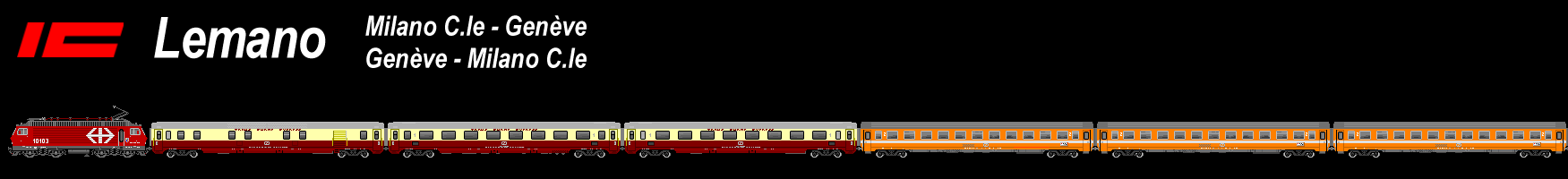
InterCity Lemano

== See also ==
- TEE carriages of FS

== Works cited ==
- Public Relations UIC (1972). TEE (in Dutch). Paris: Union International des Chemins de Fer.
- Hajt, Jörg (2001). Das grosse TEE Buch (in German). Bonn/Königswinter: Heel Verlag. ISBN 3-89365-948-X.
- Dell'Amico, Franco (2005). Il TEE Breda (in Italian). Savona: ACME.
- Goette, Peter; Willen, Peter (2006). TEE-Züge in der Schweiz und schweizer TEE-Züge im Ausland (in German). Freiburg: EK-Verlag. ISBN 978-3-88255-697-1.
- Mertens, Maurice; Malaspina, Jean-Pierre (2007). La Légende des Trans Europ Express (in French). Vannes: LR Presse. ISBN 978-29-036514-5-9.
