= Ambrosiano =

Train in Italy

TEE logo

The Ambrosiano was a national (domestic) Italian express train which connected Rome with Milan. The name refers to the patron saint of Milan. For its first 13 years it was a Trans Europ Express (TEE) service (train nos. 78/79).

It was introduced on 26 May 1974, after enough Gran Conforto carriages were delivered. The Ambrosiano served the same route as the more famous Settebello, but was locomotive-hauled, rather than using the distinctive ETR 300-type self-propelled trainsets used by the Settebello. Southbound the train departed Milan in the late afternoon and reached Roma around 11 p.m. Northbound, it originally departed in mid-morning, reaching Milan around 4 p.m., but the timings were later moved about 2 hours later.

On 31 May 1987, the Ambrosiano was changed from a TEE to a two-class InterCity train (nos. IC 534/535). By 1994, the IC Ambrosiano had been discontinued.

== See also ==
- List of named passenger trains of Italy
