= Vauban (train) =

Brussels–Switzerland express train (1988–2016)

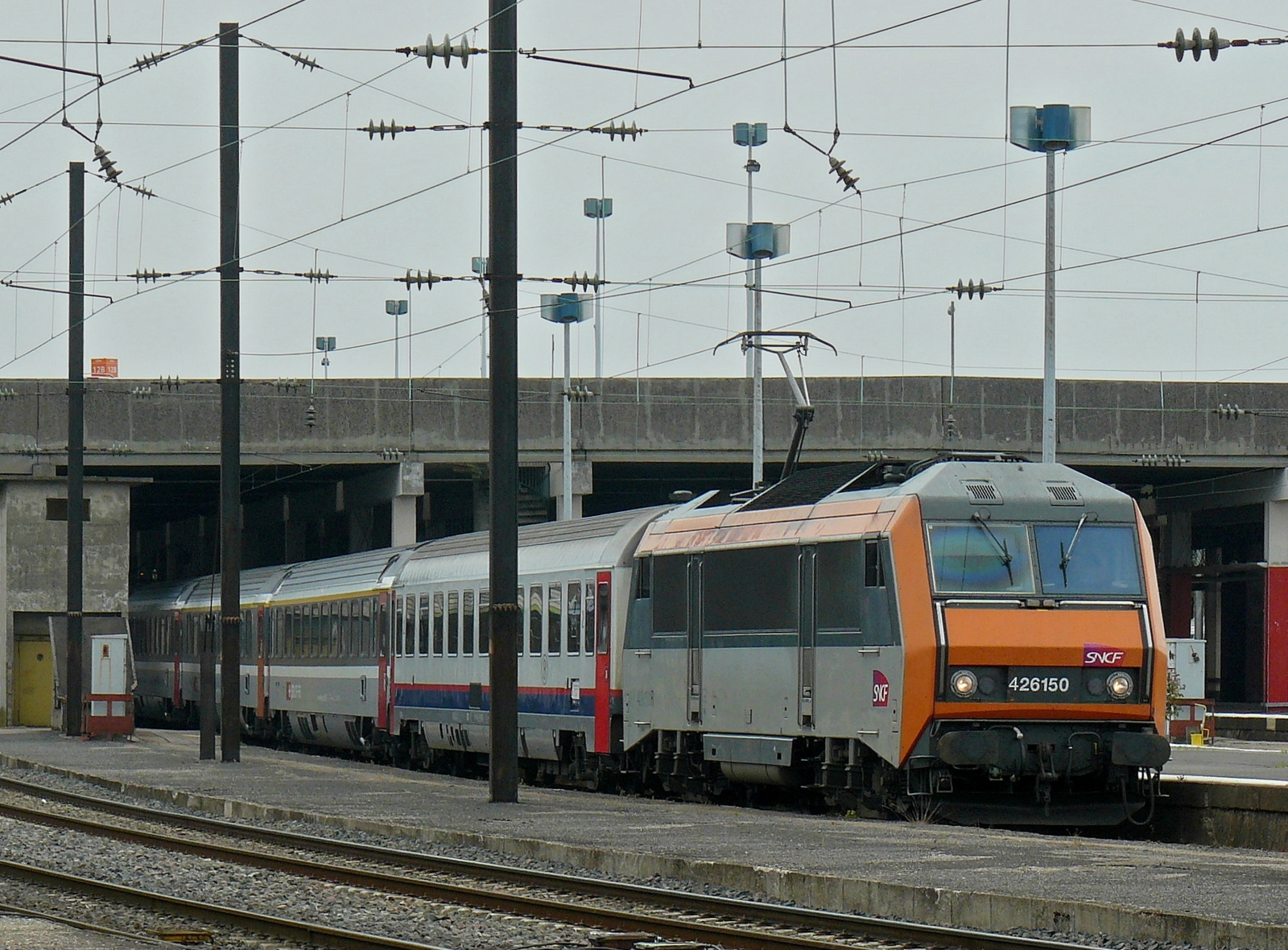
- Vauban departing from Metz, 2008.

Overview
- Service type: EuroCity (EC)
- Status: Discontinued
- Locale: Belgium; Luxembourg; France; Switzerland; Italy
- First service: 29 May 1988
- Last service: 2 April 2016
- Current operators: NMBS/SNCB; CFL; SNCF; SBB-CFF-FFS; FS

Route
- Termini: Brussels Midi/Zuid; Milano C / Brig / Zürich HB / Chur / Basel SBB
- Service frequency: Daily
- Train number: EC 90/91

Technical
- Track gauge: 1,435 mm (4 ft 8 1/2 in)
- Electrification: 15 kV AC, 16.7 Hz (Switzerland)

The Vauban was an express train that linked Brussels Midi/Zuid in Brussels, Belgium, with France, Switzerland and Italy. Introduced in 1988, it was operated by the National Railway Company of Belgium (NMBS/SNCB), the Chemins de Fer Luxembourgeois (CFL), the SNCF, the Swiss Federal Railways (SBB-CFF-FFS), and the Italian State Railways (FS).

The train is named after Sébastien Le Prestre (1633–1707), Seigneur de Vauban and later Marquis de Vauban (and commonly referred to as Vauban), who was a Marshal of France and the foremost military engineer of his age.

The Vauban was one of two EuroCity train-pairs running daily between Brussels and Basel, Switzerland; the other was the EC Iris.

== Original route ==
EC 90	country	station	km	EC 91
13:01	Switzerland	Brig	0	16:59
14:48	Switzerland	Bern	147	15:12
15:32	Switzerland	Olten	214	14:27
15:59	Switzerland	Basel	253	13:39
17:13	France	Colmar	328	12:44
17:45	France	Strasbourg-Ville	393	12:11
19:11	France	Metz Ville	552	10:43
19:32	France	Thionville	582	10:24
19:56	Luxembourg	Luxembourg	615	09:49
20:25	Belgium	Arlon	642	09:30
21:43	Belgium	Namur	780	08:08
22:18	Belgium	Brussels Leopold Quarter	835	07:33
22:28	Belgium	Brussels-North	842	07:23
22:37	Belgium	Brussels-South	848	07:15

== History ==
The Vauban began operating on 29 May 1988, and was classified from the start as a EuroCity (EC) service. It originally carried through coaches to Milano, running via Lugano and Chiasso southbound and via Brig northbound, but was not classified as an EC south of Basel.

In summer 1992, the train's route was changed to run via Brig in both directions, and the train was classified as an EC throughout its route. The section between Brig and Milano later began to operate for only part of the year, and in autumn 2004 it was discontinued entirely, making the EC Vauban's route Brussels – Basel – Bern – Brig.

In June 2007, the route was diverted to terminate in Interlaken (Ost station); it was soon diverted again, to terminate in Zurich, in December 2007.

In December 2007, the Vauban was classified as an InterRegio (IR) on the portion of its route within Switzerland, because it did not meet all the criteria for a EuroCity, but it retained EuroCity status between Brussels and Basel. The eastbound service was cut back to Brussels–Basel in December 2011, while the westbound service still departed from Zurich; in December 2013 the latter was also cut back to start in Basel. The service was cancelled in 2016, when a TGV service between Brussels and Strasbourg was introduced. Alternatively, passengers still can take an InterCity train between Brussels and Luxembourg, then a train to Strasbourg and change again to reach Basel.

== See also ==
- History of rail transport in Belgium
- History of rail transport in France
- History of rail transport in Italy
- History of rail transport in Luxembourg
- History of rail transport in Switzerland
- List of named passenger trains of Europe
