= Cisalpin (train) =

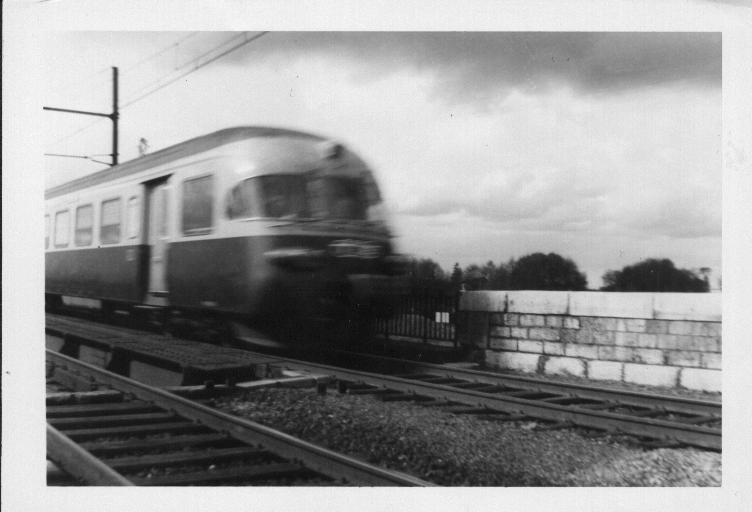

Overview
- Service type: Trans Europ Express (TEE) (1961–1984); TGV / InterCity (IC) (1984–1987); TGV / EuroCity (EC) (1987–2003)
- Status: Discontinued
- Locale: France; Switzerland; Italy
- First service: 1 July 1961
- Last service: 17 May 2003
- Former operator(s): SNCF; SBB-CFF-FFS; FS

Route
- Termini: Paris-Gare de Lyon; Milano Centrale (1961–1993); Venezia Santa Lucia (1974–1979) (Summer only); Lausanne (1993–2003)
- Service frequency: Daily
- Line(s) used: Paris–Marseille; Dijon–Vallorbe; Simplon railway Novara–Gozzano–Domodossola; Turin–Milan

Technical
- Track gauge: 1,435 mm (4 ft 8 1/2 in)
- Electrification: 1.5 kV DC (Paris - Dole); 25 kV AC, 50 Hz (Dole–Vallorbe); 15 kV AC, 16.7 Hz (Vallorbe–Domodossola); 3 kV DC (Domodossola–Milan/Venice)
Route map

The Cisalpin was an express train that linked Paris-Gare de Lyon in Paris, France, with Milano Centrale in Milan, Italy. Introduced in 1961, it was operated by the SNCF, the Swiss Federal Railways (SBB-CFF-FFS) and the Italian State Railways (FS).

The train's name literally means "this side of the Alps"; it is the Roman name for the Po Valley, which was seen as a plain at the foot of the Roman side of the Alps.

After January 1984, the Cisalpin operated as two separate trains, with timed connections in Lausanne, no longer running as a through train between France and Italy. It was discontinued in 2003.

== Route ==
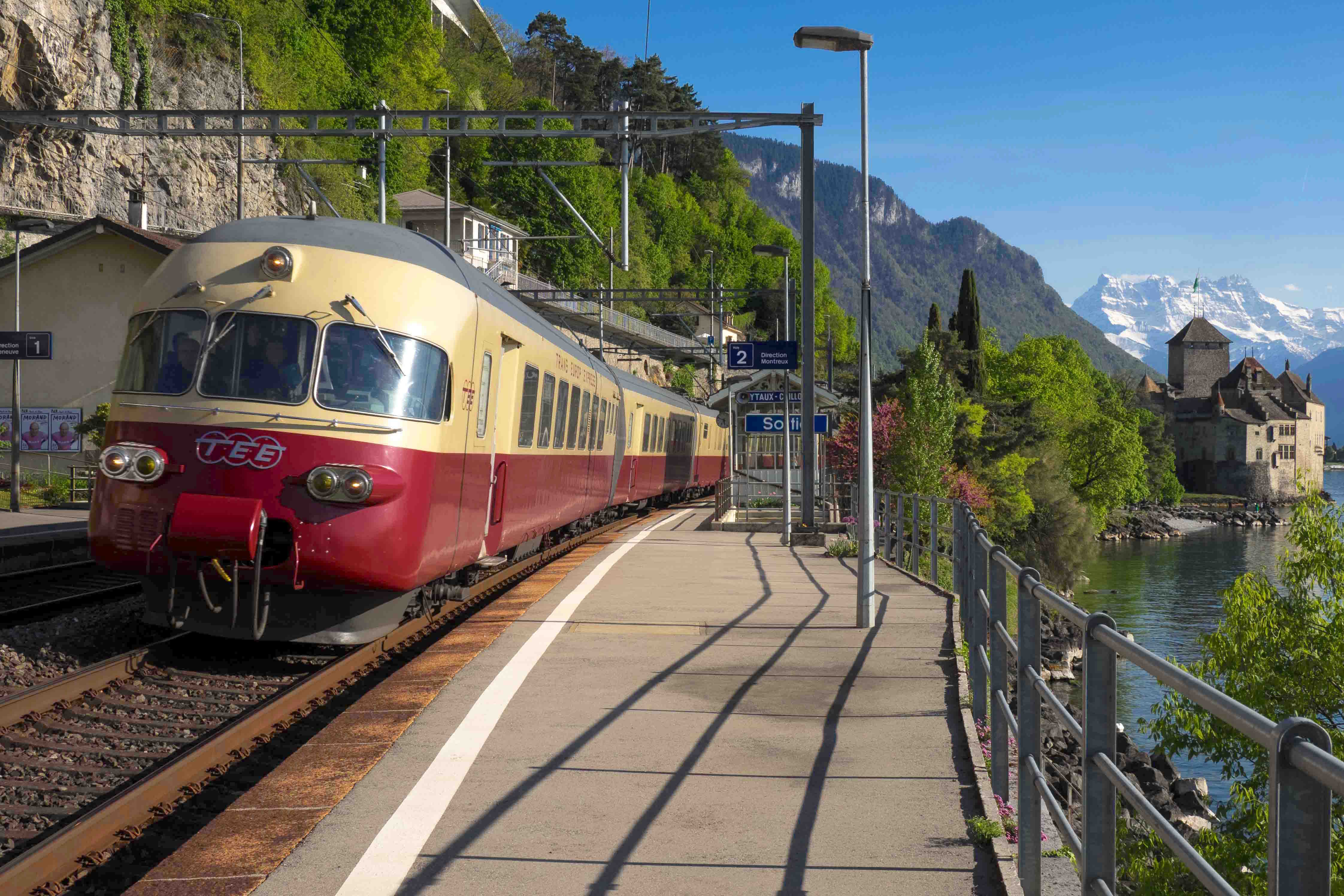
A preserved RAe TEE II trainset passing through Veytaux-Chillon station, on the Cisalpin's route (but not a stop), with Chillon Castle in the background

Until 1984, the core route of the Cisalpin ran from Paris to Dijon via the Paris–Marseille railway, and then via the Dijon–Vallorbe railway as far as Vallorbe, on the Swiss side of the border between France and Switzerland. From Vallorbe, the train ran on the Simplon, Novara–Gozzano–Domodossola and Turin–Milan railways to Milan.

Initially, the Cisalpin had the following stops:

- Paris-Gare de Lyon – Dijon-Ville – Lausanne – Brig – Domodossola – Milano Centrale

Additional stops were later added at Vallorbe, Sion and Dole-Ville.

From January 1984, the train ran for part of its route between Paris and Dijon on the LGV Sud-Est instead of the Paris–Marseille railway.

== History ==
From 1961 until 1984, the Cisalpin was a first-class-only Trans Europ Express (TEE). Originally operated by electric multiple unit trainsets of type RAe TEE II, the train became electric locomotive-hauled with the start of the summer 1974 schedule, on 26 May 1974. From the same date, the route was extended from Milan to Venice (Santa Lucia station), which portion was operated only in summer. The Venice extension continued to be part of the TEE Cisalpin every summer through 1979.

In 1980, a trip on the Cisalpin from Paris to Lausanne was featured in "Changing Trains", the final episode in Series 1 of Great Railway Journeys of the World, a BBC TV travel documentary. The "Changing Trains" trip, which was the first stage of a longer journey from Paris to Budapest, was also described in the book published to complement the series. According to Eric Robson, the presenter and author of "Changing Trains":

In the burnished buffet car the barside haggling is just a high-speed version of the conversation in any Paris café. Only the pinball machine is missing. They haven't forgotten the dining car though; it's a bubble of excellence rolling through the French farmyards. Not all the early delights of train travel have gone, it seems. Here you can still nibble at the pleasures which were once the prerogative of the rich and famous. In the best traditions of the Wagon Lits (sic) service that made those first expresses the fashionable way to travel, the waiters still get by in three or four languages. With the politeness of men who know they're the best at their job they assume that we recognise the dishes on today's menu as old friends but they're still prepared to discuss with a quiet American what's the next best thing to Californian claret. Serving trays dressed with tiny roses bring a first course of Darne de Colin Hôtelière. Later, Navarin d'Agneau Printanier. Wine, liqueurs and a growing sympathy for the poor souls 30,000 feet above us who are having their digestive fires damped by a layer of airline plastic 'food'.

— Eric Robson, "Changing Trains", in Great Railway Journeys of the World (London: British Broadcasting Corporation, 1981)

In January 1984, the Cisalpin was divided into two separate trains, connecting in Lausanne, as all of the express service in the Paris–Lausanne corridor had been converted to TGV equipment. A TGV ran as the Cisalpin between Paris and Lausanne (in both directions), and in Lausanne had a timed connection with IC 333/336, also running as the Cisalpin but not TGV, which operated Geneva–Lausanne–Milan.

On 31 May 1987, the Cisalpin was included in the then-new EuroCity (EC) network, operating to the same pattern as before – with timed connections in Lausanne – and now designated as EC 33/36 (TGV) between Paris and Lausanne and as EC 23/26 operating Geneva–Lausanne–Milan and vice versa.

On 22 May 1993, the Geneva–Milan Cisalpin was replaced by an unnamed IC train, running Lausanne–Milano and vice versa but maintaining timed connections with the Paris trains in Lausanne.

Until 17 May 2003 the name Cisalpin was still being used for one of the TGV trains serving the Paris–Lausanne route, specifically trains EC 9268/9269.

== See also ==
- Cisalpino, Swiss-Italian train operator
- History of rail transport in France
- History of rail transport in Italy
- History of rail transport in Switzerland
- List of named passenger trains of Europe
