= Edelweiss (train) =

International express train that ran through the Low Countries, France and Switzerland

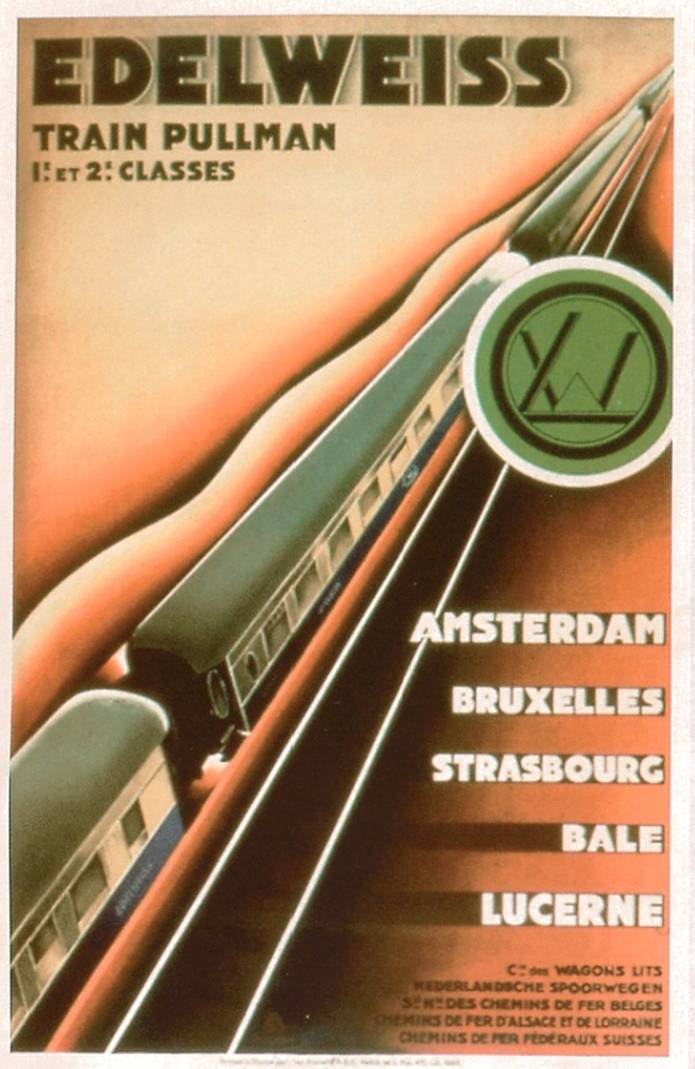
- Advertising poster for the Edelweiss, 1928

Overview
- Service type: CIWL luxury train (1928–1939); Express train (1945–1957); Trans Europ Express (TEE) (1957–1979); Express train (1979–1999)
- Status: Discontinued
- Locale: Netherlands; Belgium; Luxembourg; France; Switzerland
- First service: 15 June 1928
- Last service: 29 May 1999
- Successor: EC Jean Monnet
- Former operator(s): CIWL; NMBS/SNCB; CFL; SNCF; SBB-CFF-FFS

Route
- Termini: Amsterdam CS / Brussels; Luzern / Basel SBB / Zürich HB
- Service frequency: Daily

Technical
- Track gauge: 1,435 mm (4 ft 8 1/2 in)
- Electrification: 15 kV AC, 16.7 Hz (Basel SBB–Zürich HB)
Route map
- The route of the Edelweiss, 1928–1939 and 1957–1974.

The Edelweiss was an international express train. For most of its existence, it linked the Netherlands with Switzerland, via Belgium, Luxembourg and France. Introduced in 1928, it was named after a mountain flower, the Edelweiss (Leontopodium nivale), which is associated with alpinism and the Alps, and regarded as a symbol of Switzerland.

From its introduction until it was suspended in 1939 upon the outbreak of World War II, the Edelweiss was a luxury train operated by the Compagnie Internationale des Wagons-Lits (CIWL), and ran between Amsterdam CS in Amsterdam, the Netherlands, and Luzern station in Lucerne, Switzerland.

After the war, the Edelweiss was revived, initially as an ordinary express train between Brussels, Belgium, and Basel SBB in Basel, Switzerland. In 1957, it became one of the first of the first-class-only Trans Europ Express (TEE) trains, with its southern terminus moved from Basel further southeast, to Zürich HB in Zurich, Switzerland.

In 1974, the northern terminus of the Edelweiss was moved south, from Amsterdam to Brussels. On 27 May 1979, the Edelweiss was reclassified as a two-class express, and on 6 April 1980 the train's Basel–Zurich section was dropped. On 1 June 1997, the route was re-extended from Basel to Zurich, but the Edelweiss was discontinued on 29 May 1999, replaced by the Jean Monnet, which ran on the former train's schedule between Brussels and Strasbourg only, not south of Strasbourg.

== See also ==
- History of rail transport in Belgium
- History of rail transport in Luxembourg
- History of rail transport in France
- History of rail transport in Switzerland
- List of named passenger trains of Europe
