= Iris (train) =

Brussels–Switzerland express train (1974–2016)

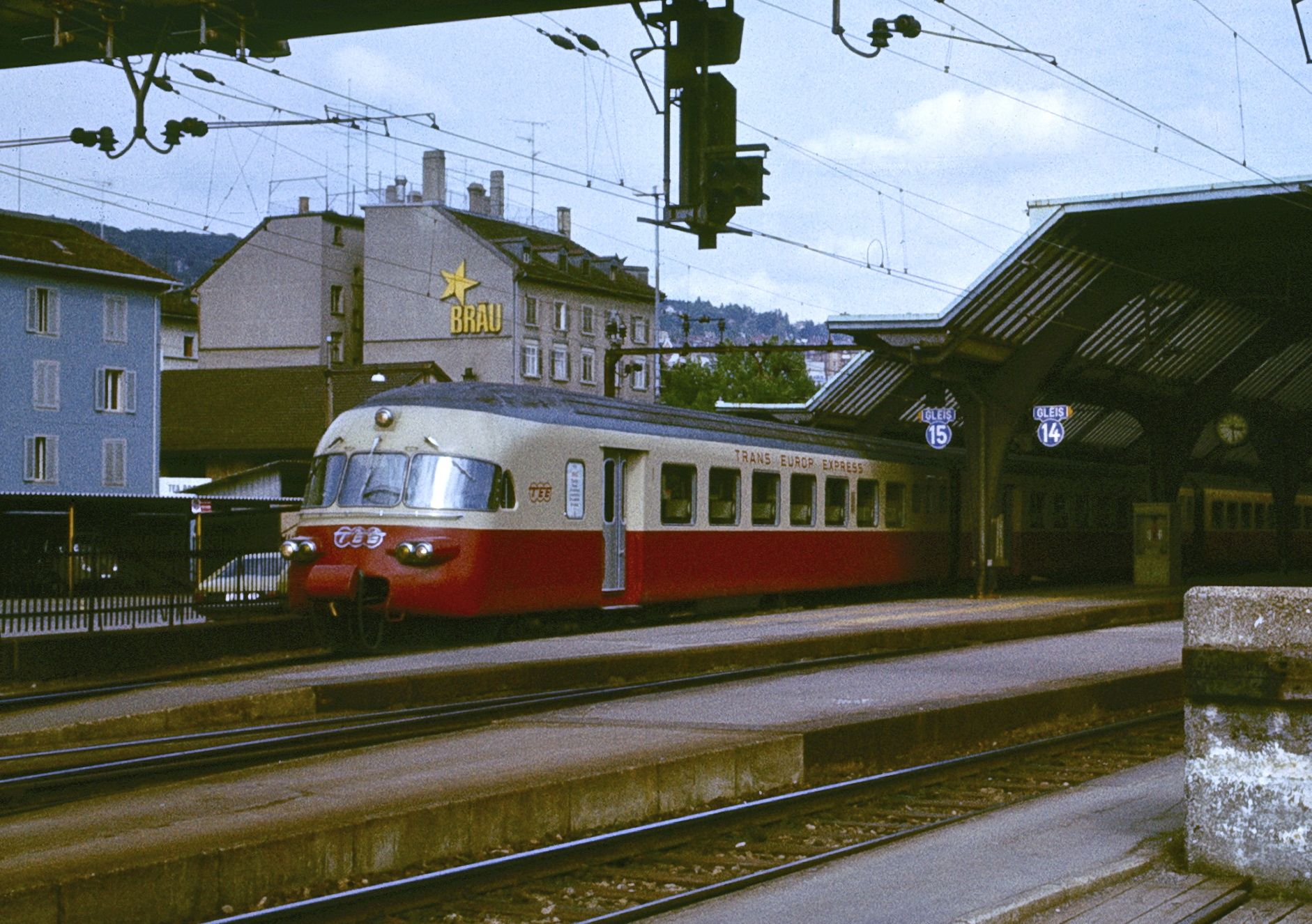
- TEE Iris departing from Zürich HB, 1979

Overview
- Service type: Trans Europ Express (TEE) (1974–1981); InterCity (IC) (1981–1987); EuroCity (EC) (since 1987)
- Status: Withdrawn
- Locale: Belgium; Luxembourg; France; Switzerland
- First service: 28 May 1974
- Last service: 2 April 2016
- Current operators: NMBS/SNCB; CFL; SNCF; SBB-CFF-FFS

Route
- Termini: Brussels Midi/Zuid; Chur / Basel SBB
- Service frequency: Daily
- Train number: EC 96/97

Technical
- Track gauge: 1,435 mm (4 ft 8 1/2 in)
- Electrification: 15 kV AC, 16.7 Hz (Switzerland)
Route map

The Iris was an express train that linked Brussels Midi/Zuid in Brussels, Belgium, with Chur station in Chur, Switzerland.

Introduced in 1974, the train was operated by the National Railway Company of Belgium (NMBS/SNCB), the Chemins de Fer Luxembourgeois (CFL), the French National Railway Corporation (SNCF) and the Swiss Federal Railways (SBB-CFF-FFS). It was named after a flower, the Yellow Iris (Iris pseudacorus), which was widespread in the Zenne/Senne valley, where Brussels is located.

Initially, the Iris was a first-class-only Trans Europ Express (TEE). In 1981, it became a two-class InterCity (IC), and on 31 May 1987, it was included in the then-new EuroCity (EC) network. As of 2015, the Iris was one of two EuroCity train-pairs running daily between Brussels and Switzerland; the other was the Vauban.

== History ==
The eastbound service was cut back to Brussels–Basel in December 2011; in December 2013 the latter was also cut back to start in Basel.

The service was discontinued on April 3 2016, alongside the introduction of a high-speed TGV service to Strasbourg.

== See also ==
- History of rail transport in Belgium
- History of rail transport in Luxembourg
- History of rail transport in France
- History of rail transport in Switzerland
- List of EuroCity services
- List of named passenger trains of Europe
