= Cisalpino =

Swiss-Italian railway company

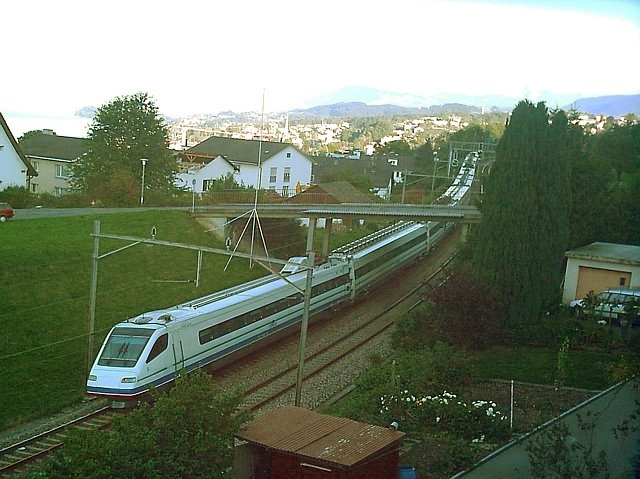
A Cisalpino ETR 470.

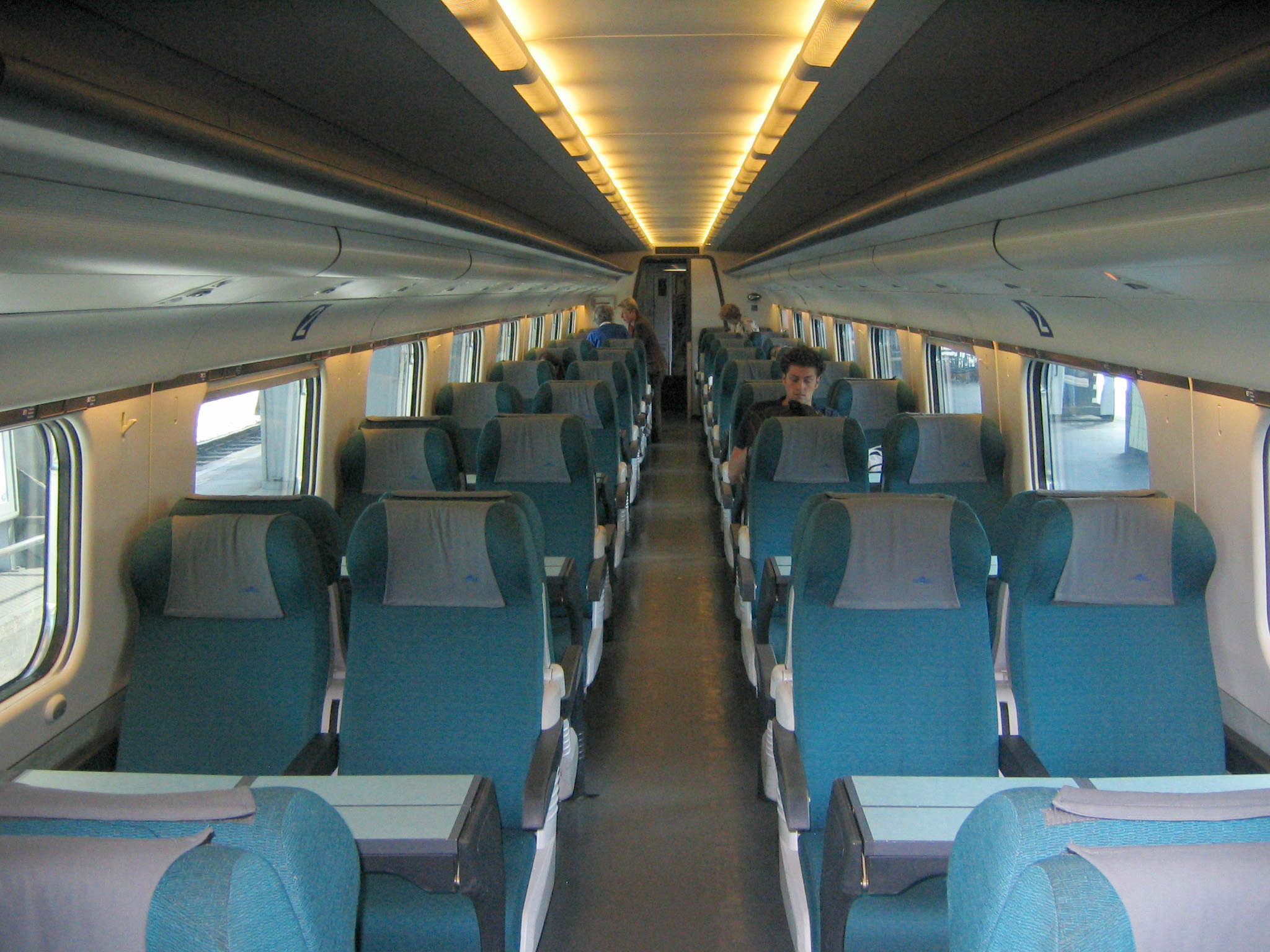
Interior of the 2nd class cars.

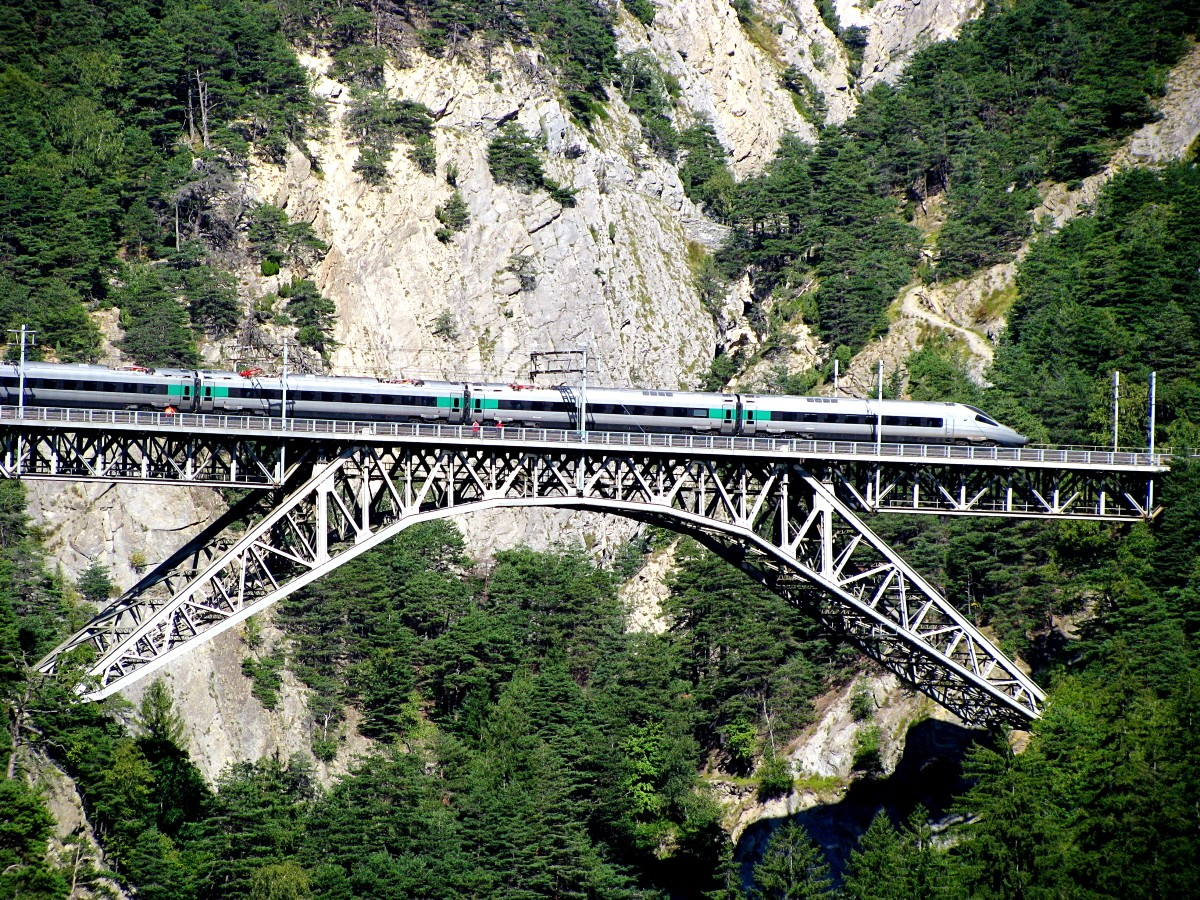
ETR 610 train operated by Cisalpino on the Lötschberg Line

Cisalpino AG (Aktiengesellschaft) was a railway company, referred to as CIS in timetables and passenger information systems, operating international trains between Switzerland and Italy (one also to Germany) connecting Basel, Schaffhausen, Zurich, Geneva, Milan, Venice, Trieste, Livorno, and Florence. The company has its legal headquarters in Muri bei Bern (BE), Switzerland, and is jointly owned by the Swiss Federal Railways and Trenitalia.

It was founded in 1993 to operate fast trains across the Alps using tilting trains. In 2005, however, it also took over all daytime long-distance passenger trains between Switzerland and Italy run with conventional, non-tilting trains.

In the fall of 2009, the project was abandoned because of mounting bad press over the quality of service and the fiasco surrounding orders placed for new trains. The remaining trains were split nearly evenly between the two owners.

Until December 2012 the company owned the ETR 610 trainsets and leased them to Trenitalia and the Swiss Federal Railways (SBB CFF FFS). The company still exists, but its name is no longer used for public purposes.

== Cisalpino tilting trains ==
The original service was branded under the name "Cisalpino," using the abbreviation "CIS" in timetables, but it has now been replaced by the name EuroCity, using the abbreviation "EC". It operated with nine Italian ETR 470 tilting trains (colloquially known as "Pendolino").

During the 2009 timetable, these trains were used on two main routes to connect Milan with northern Switzerland. Four trains per day and per direction ran via the Lötschberg line to Bern and Basel. Zurich was connected via the Gotthardbahn with seven daily trains, of which three were direct, and four others required a change in Lugano onto a leased Swiss ICN train. One of the Zurich-bound trains originally ran as far north as Stuttgart, but was cut back to Schaffhausen in 2006.

Train maintenance was carried out in the Milan Greco workshop by the Italian railway operator Trenitalia. Trains were staffed with personnel from Trenitalia as well as the Swiss Federal Railways, while the catering was provided by the Italian company Cremonini.

The trains had two classes. In first-class, power sockets were available. The Cisalpino train included a dining car.

=== Problems ===
The Cisalpino ETR 470 trains then in service suffered from a bad reputation due to continuing problems with punctuality (breakdowns in mid-journey) and cleanliness (overflowing toilets) and a ride that caused customers to complain of nausea due to these being first-generation Pendolinos. The service between Zurich and Stuttgart was discontinued in mid-December 2006 for these reasons. In 2008, 83 Cisalpino trains failed to reach their destination and 11.2% suffered a delay of 15 minutes or more (average delay 28 minutes).

=== New trains ===
A batch of fourteen new tilting trains ETR 610 was ordered in 2004 from Alstom (former Fiat Ferroviaria) in the hope of providing much-needed relief, but have themselves had some problems. Entry into service, originally to come with the December 2007 timetable change together with the opening of the Lötschberg Base Tunnel, was deferred and rescheduled for the spring of 2009. Again the trains were not ready for passenger-carrying service and their introduction was deferred to August 2009 when two did enter revenue-earning service. By December 2009 six trains were available, but the last train would be put into service only by December 2010, three years later than planned.

These new trains were ordered from the same consortium that built the original problematic trains.

==== Weight issues ====
During testing in 2009 it was found that the new ETR 610 trains were too heavy for the main Gotthard route from Zurich to Milan for which they had been ordered. The weight of the train influences the permitted cornering speed due to forces on the track – the heavier the train the slower the cornering speed allowed. It was found the new trains would have to run so slowly that traditional trains without tilting technologies would be just as fast, thus calling the whole project into question.

== EuroCity ==
Cisalpino also operated conventional EuroCity trains on two routes: from Basel or Zurich to Milan via Gotthard and from Geneva to Milan via Simplon. Three of these trains per day went all the way to Venice while one train continued from Milan to Genoa and Livorno.

These trains were run with traditional Swiss or Italian EuroCity non-tilting rolling stock. All trains had first- and second-class coaches. A dining car was available only on some of the trains.

For the Venice-bound trains, maintenance was carried out in Venice. The other trains were maintained in Switzerland. Like the Cisalpino trains, crews are provided by Trenitalia in Italy and the Swiss Federal Railways in Switzerland.

During the 2009 timetable Cisalpino also operated three couples of Milan-Bellinzona EuroCity with Italian stock.

Confusingly in 2010, whilst the name Cisalpino has disappeared from the timetables the older problematic ETR 470 trains live on. On the Zurich-Milan route, they are now also called EuroCity. The only way to tell which EuroCity is an old tilting train is to check whether folding bicycles are allowed (they are not allowed on tilting trains, although most folding bicycles actually fit into their luggage racks).

== See also ==
- Intercity Neigezug (ICN)
- Cisalpin (train)
