= EuroCity =

Network of train services in Europe

Eurocity logo

EuroCity (EC) is an international train category and brand for European inter-city trains that cross international borders and meet criteria covering comfort, speed, food service, and cleanliness. Each EC train is operated by more than one European Union or Swiss rail company, under a multilateral co-operative arrangement, and all EC trains link important European cities with each other.

The EuroCity label replaced the older Trans Europ Express (TEE) name for border-crossing trains in Europe. Whereas TEE services were first-class only, EuroCity trains convey first- and second-class coaches.

== Criteria ==
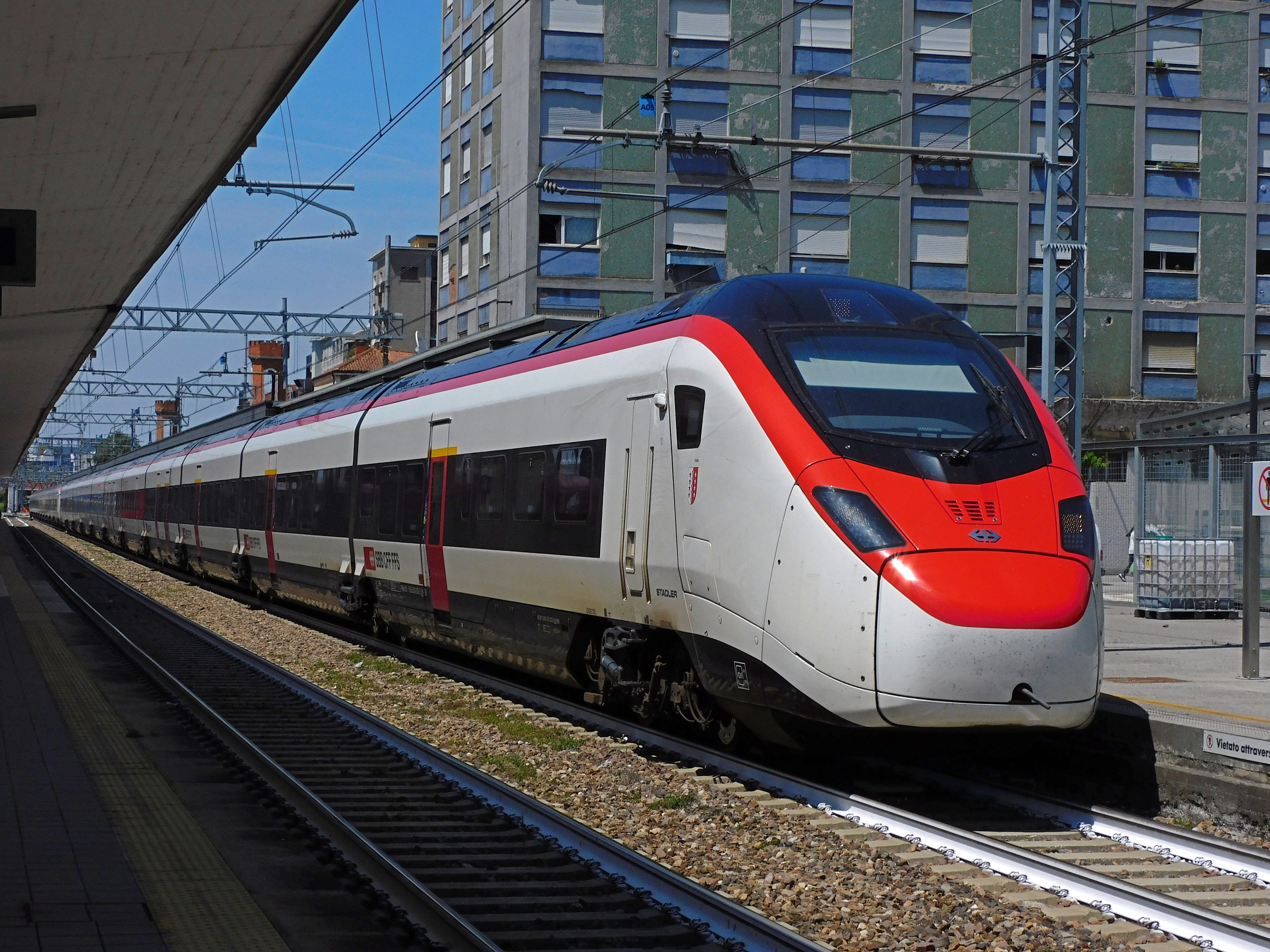
SBB's RABe 501 ("Giruno") as EuroCity Zurich–Venice

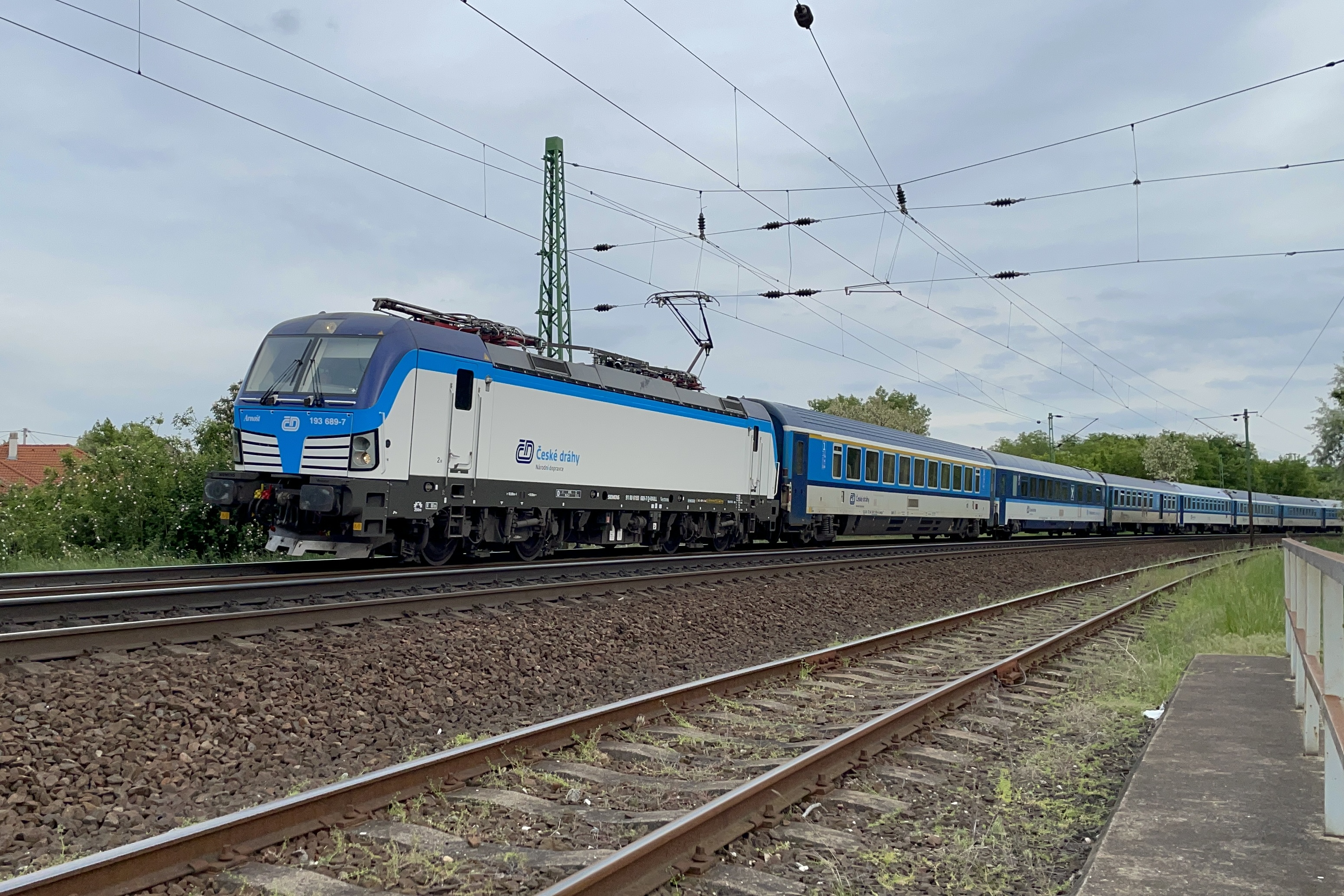
Vectron locomotive hauled EuroCity train Prague–Hamburg, operated by ČD

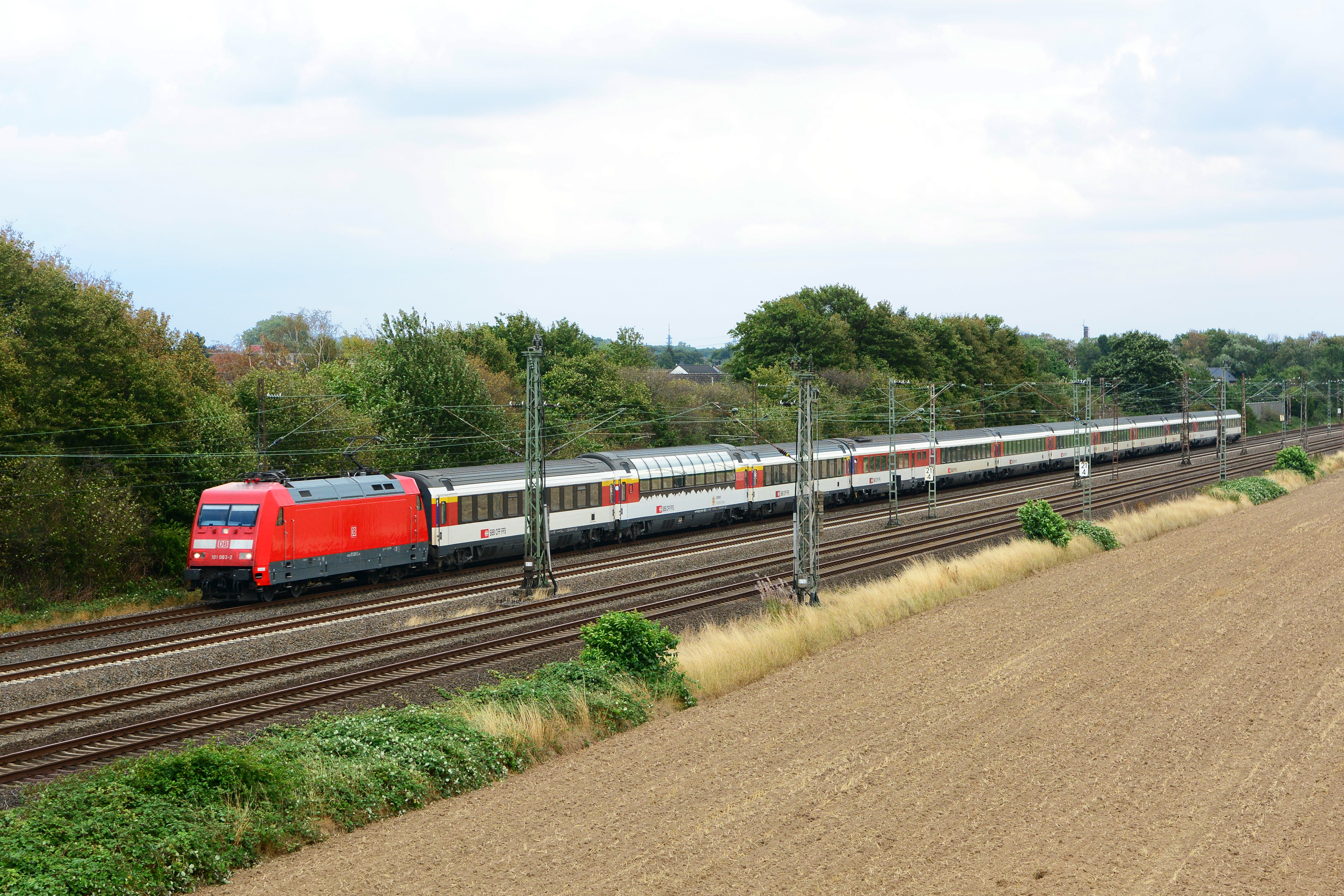
Class 101 locomotive hauled Eurocity train Hamburg–Basel, operated by DB

The criteria EuroCity trains are required to meet include the following:

- train through two or more countries
- all cars air-conditioned
- stop only at stations serving major cities
- stops scheduled to last no more than five minutes, in special cases up to 15 minutes
- food and beverages available onboard (preferably from a dining car)
- conductors speak at least two languages, one of which must be English, French, or German
- average speed (including stops) above 90 kilometres per hour (56 mph), exceptions for routes including mountainous terrain and train ferries

The EuroCity schedule was designed with train pairs running one train in both directions, thus resulting in a more frequent service than the TEE, which normally ran only once a day. In 1993 it was decided that EuroCity trains must complete their journey between 6:00 am and midnight. The night services are operated as EuroNight since 23 May 1993.

During the pre-Schengen era, passport checks were conducted on EC trains while in motion, rather than while parked at a station or requiring the passengers to disembark, as was sometimes the case for non-EC trains. A few require pre-reservation (though this is possible and recommended for all other trains) and in some countries a supplemental charge.

== Naming ==
Originally all EuroCity trains carried names, and many still do, continuing the practice started with luxury trains of the late 19th and early 20th centuries. The names are printed on brochures showing the times of arrival and departure at every stop and details of the journey; these are placed on the seats by the train staff. A few trains have used the names of the earlier Trans Europ Express or InterCity trains that they replaced on the same route, for example Iris for Brussels to Zürich. The names were mostly related to the cities and region the trains served and chosen from historical or mythological figures, geographical and botanical names or regional products. In 1991, the decision was made to name the EuroCity services after famous Europeans, which in some cases resulted in the renaming of existing services, e.g. the EC trains between Germany and Denmark.

On 29 July 1991, the European Community decided to reorganise the legal structure of the railways in order to stimulate commercial operation and reduce government subsidies. The directive, in force in 1993, stated that railway services and infrastructure should be split and operators should be able to offer their services everywhere in Europe using the national infrastructure. After 20 years the implementation is still ongoing, but it has affected the railway operators already. High-speed services that have been introduced subsequently, using both new rolling stock and some newly built line sections, have all used brand names that are applied to all trains of their class or category, rather than naming every single service. As a consequence, the named EC trains on the Paris–Brussels–Amsterdam route disappeared in 1995–96, replaced by unnamed TGV trains, then by the Thalys service, which in turn was subsumed into the Eurostar brand in 2023. Between the Netherlands and Germany the Intercity-Express (ICE) was introduced in 2000, resulting in the near disappearance of the EuroCity brand on those train routes, and with it the use of train names. For marketing reasons, the four EuroCity services between Germany and Poland were advertised as the Berlin–Warszawa Express effective 29 September 2002, thus marketing a product instead of naming individual trains. Preparations for privatisation of Deutsche Bahn led to the discontinuation of names for the EuroCity services in Allgäu on 15 December 2002, and for the other German-operated EC trains on 12 December 2004. The French–Swiss TGV services lost their individual names on 17 May 2003, when "Lyria" was chosen as the brand name used collectively for those TGVs. After the collapse of Cisalpino on 13 December 2009, the named trains between Italy and Switzerland disappeared as well. Farther east, all EC services continue to carry names.

== Network ==
EuroCity network in 1987 TGVs between France and Switzerland Other EuroCity routes TEE Gottardo (converted to EC in 1988) Overnight services International InterCity routes

EuroCity network, 2015

On 31 May 1987, the network started with 64 EuroCity trains, serving 200 cities in 13 countries. They were made up of 56 day services and eight night services. The network included the international TGV services between France and Switzerland along with several other EuroCity trains, except the TEE Gottardo, which was converted to EuroCity only one year later. There were also several night services (note that the boat-train Benjamin Britten (London–Amsterdam) overnight portion was by ferry, not by train). Additionally, there were three international InterCity trains, which did not qualify as EuroCity.

The network was set up by the national railways of Norway, Sweden, Austria, Switzerland, and the European Community. One year later Hungary joined as well. The network grew from 64 services in 1987 to 76 services in 1990, and in 1991 the frequency was improved, resulting in an expansion to 102 services by 1991. Until then, it was a mainly western European network but from 1991 it began expanding beyond Hungary in the east. After the historic developments occurring in Central and Eastern Europe regarding the Fall of Communism around that time, Yugoslavia and Czechoslovakia became part of the system in 1991, and Poland in 1992. In the following years, Czechoslovakia and later Yugoslavia were split and their parts became individual members too. In 1993 the night services were rebranded as the EuroNight network, the start of a gradual decline in the number of EuroCity trains in Western Europe. When high-speed lines opened in France, Italy, Spain, Germany, and Belgium/Netherlands/Luxembourg, the EuroCity services were replaced by high-speed trains, mostly with their own brands and therefore not classified as EuroCity. In Central and Eastern Europe more services were introduced, and over a period of 25 years the centre of the EC network had shifted east.

== EuroCity Express and EuroCity Direct ==
=== EuroCity Express ===
Since December 2017, the EuroCity label is supplemented by the new classification EuroCity Express (ECE). Initially, it was only used for a single service, between Frankfurt (Main) and Milan (via Basel SBB and Lucerne), operated by SBB's ETR 610 high-speed tilting trains. Since 2024, SBB RABe 501 ("Giruno") trainsets of SBB are used on this line. Another ECE service was introduced in December 2020 between München Hbf and Zurich HB, via Bregenz, also operated by ETR 610 trainsets of SBB. The ECE classification is only used in Germany; in Austria, Italy, and Switzerland these trains run as EC. This is due to tariff reasons: in Germany, EC normally are classified below ICE, the highest class, and thus slightly cheaper. ECE however are the same rank as ICE, and are priced as such, as the Deutsche Bahn claims them to provide similar levels of comfort.

=== EuroCity Direct ===
Since December 2024, the EuroCity Direct (ECD) classification has been used for the express Benelux Train service between Lelystad and Brussels Midi/Zuid via Amsterdam Zuid, operated by Nederlandse Spoorwegen and the National Railway Company of Belgium. It complements the regular EuroCity service between the two countries that makes more stops between Rotterdam and Brussels (this service does not abide by the original criteria mentioned above). Both services run 16 times per day. While the EuroCity service applies government-agreed kilometric fares, ECD uses airline-style dynamic pricing.

== See also ==
- Eurail – European rail pass
- EuroCity in Germany
- EuroNight – Night train category in Europe
- Rail transport in Europe
- The Man in Seat Sixty-One – British travel website
- Train categories in Europe
