= TEE carriages of FS =

Class of Italian rail passenger car

FS type TEE carriages
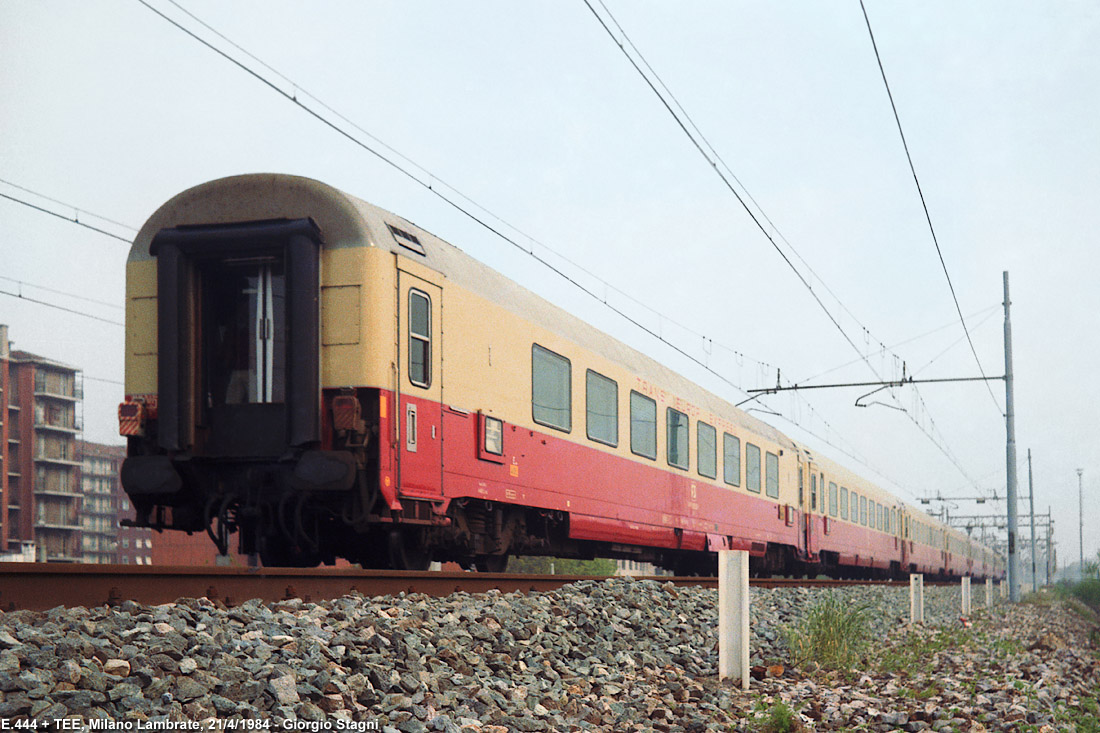
- FS type TEE carriages in Milan, 1984
- In service: From 1972 until conversion to Gran Comfort coaches (1990–1994)
- Manufacturer: Fiat Ferroviaria
- Constructed: 1971–1973
- Number built: 28 of which: 13 compartment cars; 5 single saloon cars; 5 dining cars; 5 van/baggage cars.
- Capacity: 48 1st class seats (compartment carriage and saloon carriage); 41+6 (dining car); 4+2 places for customs and service personnel (carriage van)

Specifications
- Car length: 26,400 mm (86.6 ft)
- Width: 2,805 mm (9.203 ft)
- Height: 4,050 mm (13.29 ft)
- Floor height: 1,250 mm (49 in)
- Wheelbase: 2,500 mm (98 in)
- Maximum speed: 200 km/h (120 mph)
- Weight: 50,500 kg (49.7 long tons; 55.7 short tons) (compartment carriage, saloon carriage and dining carriage); 58,900 kg (58.0 long tons; 64.9 short tons) (carriage van)
- Track gauge: 1,435 mm (4 ft 8 1/2 in)

The FS type TEE (Trans Europ Express) carriages were the result of a study commissioned in 1967 by Ferrovie dello Stato (FS) to FIAT - Sezione Materiale Ferroviario of Turin to replace on the Trans Europ Express trains entrusted to the Italian railways the TEE ALn 442/448 railcars with trainsets consisting of locomotives and carriages.

The carriages, ordered in 1969 and delivered between 1971 and 1973, were used on the TEE Lemano, Mediolanum, and Ligure services, but not on the TEE Mont Cenis, which was discontinued on September 30, 1972.

In 1970–71 the FS ordered a further series of coaches called Gran Confort, similar to the TEEs but compatible only with the 3 kV direct current electrification system, which were destined for Trans Europ Express trains in domestic service on the Italian rail network.

In 1984, with the transformation into InterCity of the Mediolanum, the last Trans Europ Express in international service operated with Italian rolling stock, the TEE carriages were put in composition with the TEE Adriatico in domestic service between Milan and Bari, with which they served until 1987.

The TEE carriages were finally converted to Gran Confort between 1990 and 1994.

== Genesis of the project ==
At the inception of the first Trans Europ Express lines, most of the planned links were not yet fully electrified, and the service was entrusted to Diesel self-propelled trains expressly built by the railway administrations that had joined the TEE grouping.

However, the TEE ALn 442/448 railcars, put into service by the FS starting in 1957, soon demonstrated their limitations on the ramps of the Brenner and Simplon passes, and as early as 1959 the Swiss Federal Railways (SBB), aware of this fact, proposed that the State Railways join them in the purchase of the TEE multi-voltage RAe 1050 electric trainsets produced by Oerlikon, but the offer was not accepted. Among the reasons that drove the FS to the refusal was the consideration that the multi-voltage electric trains could have been used immediately only on the TEE Lemano (Milano Centrale–Geneve Cornavin), while on the remaining Italian TEEs there were heavy uncertainties related to the slow progress of the program to convert to 3 kV direct current the lines still electrified with the three-phase system and to the lack of electrification on important parts of the French TEE network.

In the following years, with a view to solving the above electrification problems, the replacement of the TEE railcars was taken up by the FS with two proposals developed by its Material and Traction Service, which had as a common element the realization of an electric-powered trainset that, like the Swiss electric train, did not require the replacement of the traction unit at the borders:

- the first proposal called for a light-material train consisting of two ALe 601 electric railcars and a Le 480 trailer modified to accommodate the 15 kV 16 2/3 Hz and 25 kV 50 Hz single-phase current conversion equipment, kitchen, and luggage. The train would have had a total capacity of 108 seats (54 on each ALe 601), a continuous output of 1,600 kW (2,100 hp), and a maximum speed of 160 km/h (99 mph).
- the second proposal was to build an ordinary material train consisting of four carriages pulled by a four-voltage locomotive (direct current at 1.5 kV and 3 kV and single-phase current at 15 kV 16 2/3 Hz and 25 kV 50 Hz) with continuous power of 1,900 kW (2,500 hp) and a maximum speed of 180 km/h (110 mph), based on the mechanics of Diesel locomotive D.443.

The ordinary-material solution, which would have offered 40 percent more seats for the same cost, led to a study in which, in addition to the four-voltage locomotive, three models of carriages derived from the X-type were defined, namely a 54-seat first-class carriage, a 30-seat first-class carriage with luggage compartment, radio cabin and customs compartment, and a 42-seat dining car, 12 of which could be reserved, with crew compartment, pantry and kitchen. However, the study, completed in October 1966, was not followed up.

The shelving of these plans effectively marked the abandonment by the FS of the realization of a multi-voltage vehicle that would have avoided time wasters in changing locomotives at the frontier.

The final solution came in 1967, when the FS entrusted FIAT – Railway Material Division of Turin with the study of a new series of coaches with a high degree of comfort, meeting the international standards set by the TEE grouping and capable of traveling at speeds of 200 km/h (120 mph).

In 1969, following the positive outcome of the studies, the FS ordered a group of 28 TEE carriages from FIAT, subdivided as follows:

- 13 first-class compartment cars,
- 5 single saloon first-class coaches,
- 5 restaurant cars,
- 5 wagon coaches.

The first car with F.71 bogies began trial runs in late 1970. They took place on lines that at the time allowed a maximum speed of 200 km/h (120 mph): the Piacenza–Fidenza sections of the Milan–Bologna and Pomezia–Latina sections of the Rome–Naples Direttissima railway.

Deliveries were staggered between 1971 and 1973.

== General features ==
As mentioned above, the main design requirements were to achieve a high degree of comfort, meet international standards, and be able to travel at a maximum speed of 200 km/h (120 mph).

In order to ensure maximum travel comfort, the designers started from the premise of providing the traveler with as many amenities as possible, giving him or her the best possible enjoyment of the scenery and ensuring that he or she did not arrive at the destination tired. Great care was therefore taken to create an aesthetically pleasing environment, thermally and acoustically insulated from the outside, equipped with air conditioning, an efficient lighting system, and a system for broadcasting music and announcements for travelers. In addition to the comfort of the seats, special attention was paid to the design of the trolleys to ensure a quiet and vibration-free ride. Finally, details such as the electrically operated Venetian blinds incorporated between the double glasses of the large windows and the closets for storing clothes behind the seats in the compartment cars were not neglected. To further increase running comfort, the solution of the "floating floor" was adopted, that is, a non-rigid connection of the floor with the body, thus reducing vibrations from the bogies or from the outside in general.

With regard to safety, FIAT's engineers did not stop at strict compliance with the standards of the Union internationale des chemins de fer (UIC) Form 567, which was mandatory for the carriages to be admitted to international service, but went further, making the structural design of the body so that it provided greater protection than required for passengers in the event of a collision. The coaches were made compliant with the International Coach Regulations (RIC), enabled without restriction to board in normal service on the ferries of the Italian, German (Deutsche Bundesbahn – DB), Danish (Danske Statsbaner – DSB) and Swedish (Statens Järnvägar – SJ) railroads according to UIC board 569, and enabled to run coupled on curves with a minimum radius of 80 m.

The need to run on the Western European rail networks, which were electrified with four different power systems, and the high demand for electricity from carriage services (particularly from air-conditioning equipment) required the use of multi-voltage converters that were not available at the time with sufficient power levels and reliability. It was therefore decided to build a conversion station equipped with rotary converters fed from the Carriage Electric Heating pipeline, installed on board a special generator wagon, and to distribute the power to the individual cars via a specially dedicated 660 V 50 Hz three-phase line. This choice, which was almost obligatory, allowed a significant lightening of the carriages and quickened the maneuvers of switching the power supply at border stations, but made the presence of the generator wagon indispensable in the composition of the trains. The solution of installing a generator set on a carriage, on the other hand, followed a practice already adopted on the TEE equipment of other administrations, such as the stainless steel DEV (Division des Études Voitures) 1956 Mistral type coaches of the SNCF, which became TEE in 1965, the 1969 Talgo type TEE coaches of the RENFE, and the 1970 Grand Confort type TEE coaches, also of the SNCF.

=== Mechanics ===
==== Body ====
The chassis of the body consisted of the two side members, the crossbeams, and the corrugated floor plate. The body structure was given a special role for the safety of travelers by inserting next to the intercommunication passages at the end of the headers a pair of uprights, called "antitelescopic" uprights, with the task of counteracting the penetration of one vehicle into the other in the event of a collision.

The body was fitted with intercoms with cylindrical rubber gaskets with double sliding doors electrically controlled by footboards. The doors for passenger access, sliding along the side and equipped with a large folding step, were operated by an electro-pneumatic system. Opening was controlled locally by a handle, subject to remote unlocking from the trainmaster. Simultaneous closing of the doors of the entire convoy could be controlled by a key from any one of them.

The windows were double glazed with an electrically operated Venetian blind embedded. The coaches were painted in TEE livery in Bordeaux red with a sand-yellow band at the windows that read "TRANS EUROP EXPRESS" in red lettering above them; the roof was painted in fog gray as was the median thread between the bands.

On the sides were lockable enclosures equipped with backlighting for displaying route signs, which also played a safety role by preventing accidental detachment of the sign at high speeds.

==== Bogies ====
The design of the F.71 bogie (an evolution of the experimental FIAT 7195 C bogie) was conducted with the help of the electronic computer. The results of the structural analysis led to a major revision of the previously used concept, which was replaced by a new scheme consisting of an H-shaped frame made up of two double swan-neck shaped stringers and lacking the end cross members. The connection of the wheelsets to the bogie frame (primary suspension) and of the bogie frame to the body frame (secondary suspension) was accomplished by means of elastic parts comprising coil springs and rubber gussets capable of providing both vertical and transverse suspension and allowing rotation between the body and bogie by elastic deformation. The bogies, without fifth wheel and swing beam, directly supported the body by means of rubber gussets interposed between it and the springs of the secondary suspension.

The bogies were equipped with mixed braking with two discs for each wheelset, assisted by a cleaning strain for each wheel, which, in addition to its main function of keeping the rolling surface clean and warm, contributed 20 percent of the braking action. This type of mixed braking remained unique on FS carriages, as the evolution of anti-skid systems enabled the adoption of integral disc braking on later types of carriages. The bogies were also prepared for the fitting of a pair of electromagnetic braking pads, but these were never applied.

The success of the F.71 bogies enabled FIAT to victoriously face international competition in the tender held by Eurofima for new European unified carriages.

=== Systems ===
==== Braking system ====
The braking system included the pneumatically activated service brake, which acted on all axles of the carriage, and the manually operated parking brake, controlled by a pair of handwheels that acted independently on their respective bogies.

Compressed air from the pipeline running along the convoy was stored in a main tank that fed two auxiliary tanks at controlled pressure. These simultaneously supplied the pneumatic cylinders of the disc and stump brakes by means of a distributor that received pilot pressure from the general automatic brake line, which was connected to the locomotive brake control and the emergency carriage brakes, and a supply relay that allowed variable pressure air to pass from the auxiliary reservoirs to the brake cylinders. The system was complemented by a pair of solenoid valves driven by an electronic control unit that received the signal from four tachometer dynamos connected to the respective axles, which were intended to reduce the braking action on any blocked axles.

==== Air-conditioning system ====
The Marelli-Stone-type air-conditioning system provided winter heating and summer refrigeration of the carriage by means of two air-conditioning units positioned above the lavatories. Each unit comprised a copper coil for refrigeration and an electric radiator for heating, which were invested by a flow of air produced by a pair of centrifugal fans that, after dehumidification, was fed into a distribution ducting that led to vents located on the top of the carriage. The refrigeration coils were fed by a motor-compressor unit and a condenser cooled by two electric fans. The electric heater for heating was fed from the overhead contact line through the electric heating pipeline by means of an automatic voltage selector; the same line was headed by space heaters, located under the seats at the windows, to supplement the blown-air heating from the ceiling.

==== Electrical system ====
All models of FS TEE coaches were equipped with four electrical conduits that headed to the locomotive or generator wagon:

- the electric heating conduit carried the current supplied by the locomotive to the rotary converters installed on board the generator wagon and, through an automatic voltage selector, to the radiating elements of the heating system in the individual coaches;
- the three-phase 660 V 50 Hz conduit (called the "train line") carried the current produced by the generator wagon's rotating units to the utilities of the individual carriages;
- two low-voltage service conduits carried signals for the public address system, remote unlocking signals for opening doors, and additional electrical connections.

On each car a three-phase transformer provided for lowering the voltage to the standard value of 380 V 50 Hz for supplying the higher power services, a voltage that was then brought to the other values required by the various types of utilities on board. In particular, voltages of 220 V 50 Hz were available for the air-conditioning system, 32 V 50 Hz for the full-half-light timer control, and a continuous voltage of 26 V for battery charging. Finally, from the latter was obtained by means of an inverter the alternating voltage of 220 V 50 Hz, which was necessary for the supply of the utilities that had to be ensured even in the absence of the locomotive, such as the lighting of the carriages and the sockets for razors and towels in the toilets.

=== Differences from Gran Confort coaches ===
The Gran Confort coaches, ordered later for domestic service on the FS network, were essentially identical to the TEEs, but were not licensed for operation in international service. In addition to being distinguished by a different exterior livery, characterized by the lower part of the body and the roof in slate gray and an antique ivory band with two signal red threads at the windows, the Gran Confort differed from the TEEs in the electrical power supply system for the auxiliary services, which, instead of the pair of centralized rotating units on the generator van, provided for the installation on each carriage of a 45 kVA motor-alternator powered at 3 kV direct current directly from the electric heater pipe. This meant that there was a mass penalty of a few tons compared to the corresponding TEE cars, but no longer made the generator wagon necessary.

== Features of individual models ==
The FS TEE car family included two first-class car models, a dining car and a van car. All cars, including the van, were equipped with end vestibules accessible from the outside on both sides with power-assisted opening doors and from the gangway connection with automatically operated doors. Curiously, despite the success garnered by the equipment of other administrations in the TEE grouping, no bar car was planned.

=== Compartment carriage ===
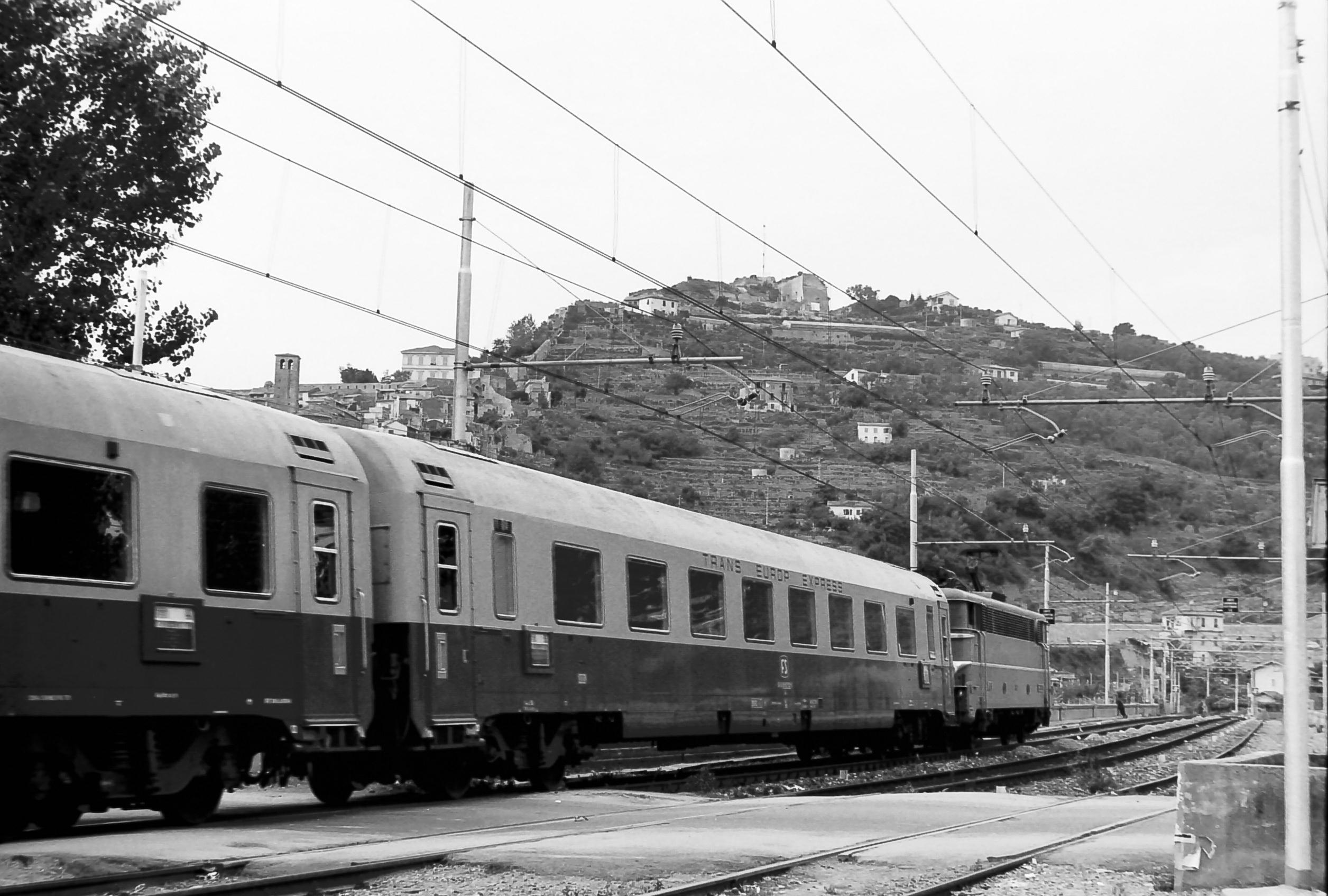
Az-type compartment cars at the head of the Milan–Avignon TEE Ligure train leaving Ventimiglia in September 1975

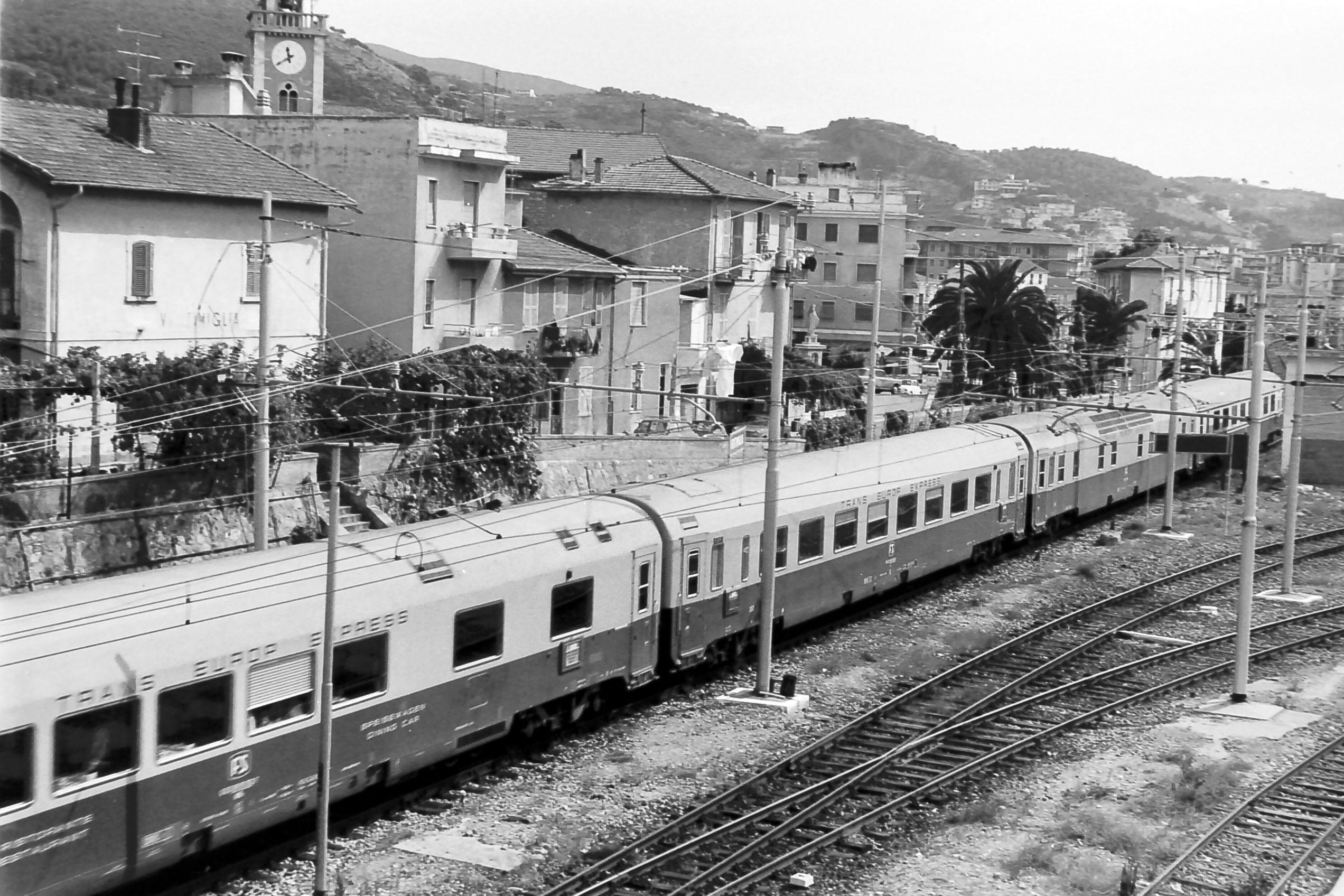
Type WRz dining car, type Az saloon car and type Dz van car in composition with the Milan–Avignon TEE Ligure arriving in Ventimiglia in September 1975

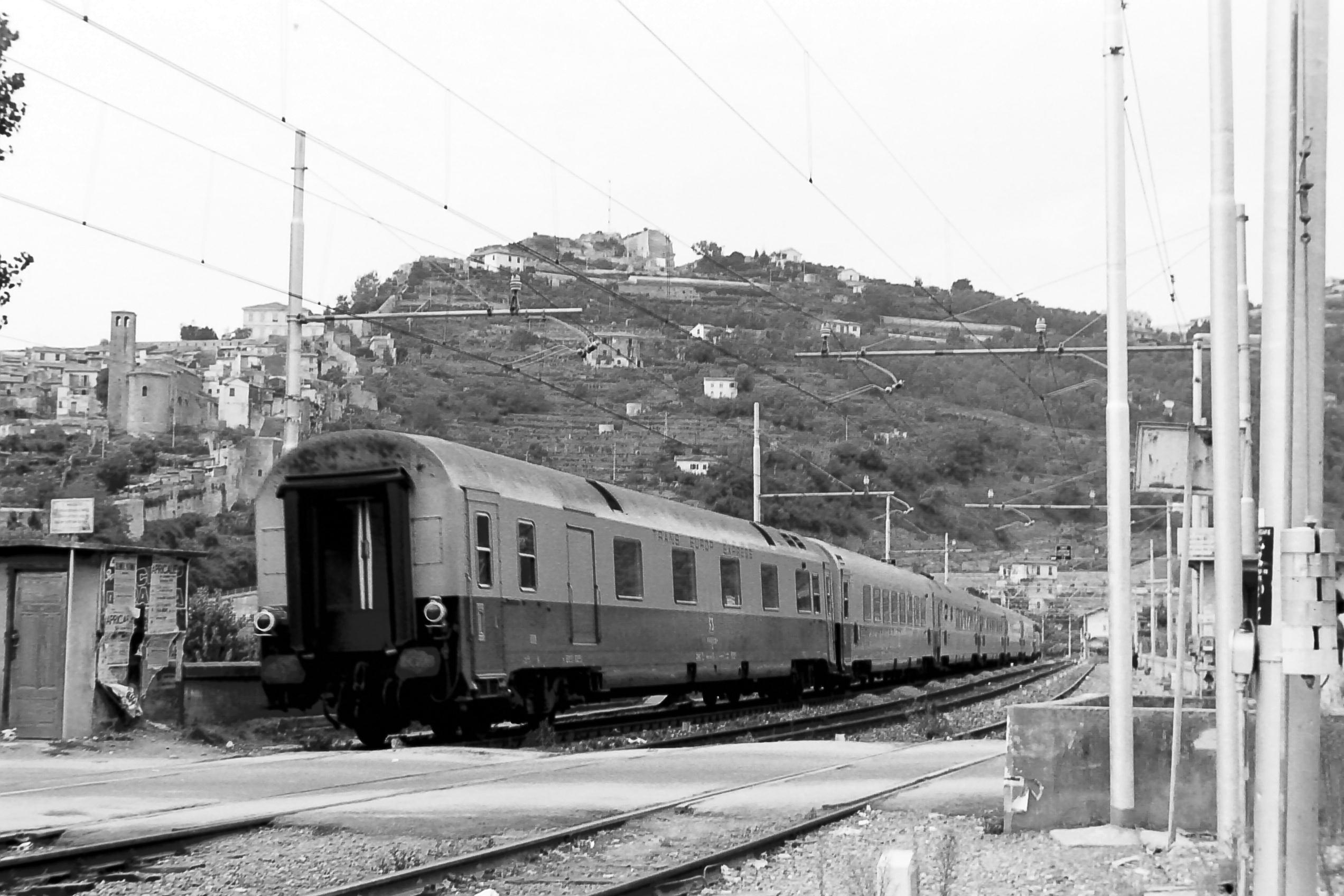
Dz-type van car in the rear of the TEE Ligure leaving Ventimiglia in September 1975

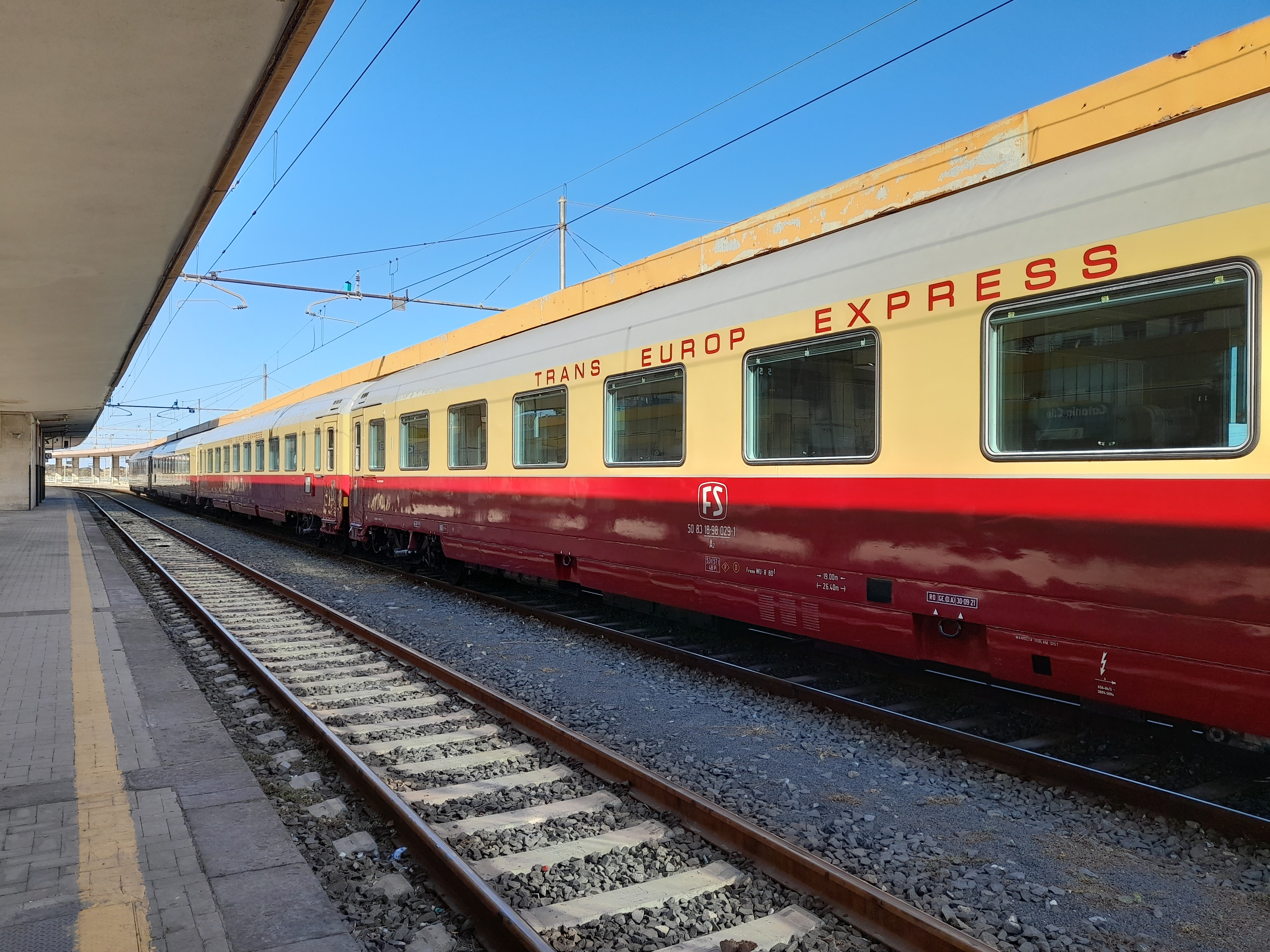
The "TEE" compartment carriage, Az 50 83 18-98 029-1, at a stop at Catania Central station, July 15, 2022

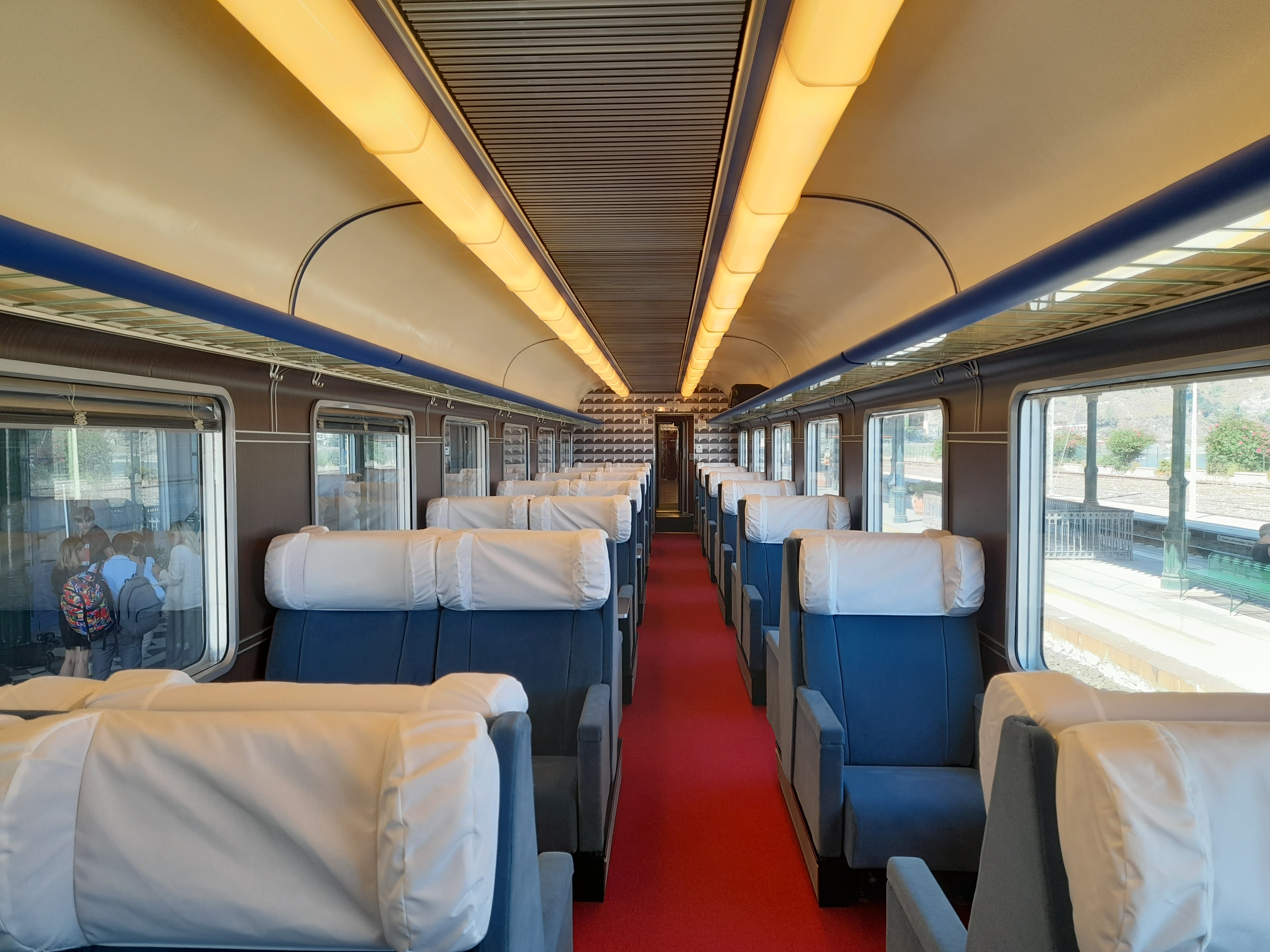
The interior of the saloon "TEE" carriage, Az 50 83 18-98 524-1, stopping at Taormina-Naxos station, July 15, 2022

The compartment cars, built in thirteen units, received the UIC numbering 61 83 18-90 900-912 Az.

The cars offered 48 seats arranged in eight compartments accessible by a 750 mm (30 in) wide side aisle and included, in order, the following rooms:

- a vestibule equipped with a wide lavatory from which the side aisle was accessed by means of a manually opening hinged glass door;
- five "smoking" compartments with a total of 30 seats;
- three "non-smoking" compartments with 18 total seats;
- a vestibule similar to the previous one.

Each compartment, divided from the side aisle by a glass wall fitted with a sliding door, was equipped with six comfortable armchairs with individual headrests and swivel backs, behind which was a wardrobe locker. The lower part of the luggage racks, arranged sideways above the seats, was equipped with individual spotlights for reading. Lighting was provided by four fluorescent tubes arranged on the sides of the pavilion, over which were cut openings for air-conditioning distribution.

The seats were upholstered in blue wool Mohair velvet with white linings at the headrests.

=== Saloon carriage ===
The saloon cars, built in five units, received the UIC classification 61 83 18-90 950-954 Az.

The cars, built to subsidize the dining car when needed and to benefit groups who needed to travel in the same environment, offered 48 seats arranged in a saloon about 18 m long and included, in order, the following rooms:

- a large vestibule with lavatory, dressing table and light baggage compartment from which the saloon was accessed by a manually opening sliding glass door;
- a "non-smoking" room with 18 total seats, separated from the rest of the saloon by a glass partition fitted with a hinged door;
- a "smoking" room with 30 total seats;
- a vestibule similar to the previous one.

Seating was arranged transversely on rows of opposing one and two-seat sofas, separated by the intermediate aisle. Each pair of couches was equipped with removable tables, sheltered in special compartments under the windows, which allowed the carriage to be used to subsidize the dining car in case of need.

The seats were upholstered in blue Mohair wool velvet with white linings at the headrests.

=== Dining car ===
The dining cars, built in five units, received the UIC classification 61 83 88-90 900-904 Rz.

One of these, which was destroyed, was replaced by the Gran Confort car 50 83 88-98-011 Rz, which was converted to TEE in 1975 receiving the numbering 61 83 88-90 905 Rz.

The cars, for whose furnishings materials were chosen to ensure comfort and ease of cleaning, included, in order, the following rooms:

- a vestibule that entered the dining room by means of an automatically operated crystal door;
- a 41-seat dining room with individual seats and 6 seats for service personnel, arranged in two one and two-seat rows separated by the middle aisle;
- a side aisle room from which the pantry and kitchen were accessed and on the outer side of which was a hatch for loading provisions and kitchen supplies;
- a vestibule with lavatory.

The kitchen was equipped with an electric stove and a sink with hot and cold water. Water for kitchen use was supplied by a 100-litre (22 imp gal; 26 US gal) auxiliary tank placed on the top of the kitchen and a 200-litre (44 imp gal; 53 US gal) electric water heater fed from an 1,100-litre (240 imp gal; 290 US gal) tank placed in the underbody, properly insulated and heated to prevent freezing at extreme temperatures. The refrigerator was powered by 380 V 50 Hz, with the exception of the compartments for perishable foods, which were refrigerated by a second motor-compressor powered by 24 V direct current from on-board batteries.

Toward the end of the 1970s, electric stoves in the kitchens, which were disliked by the staff because of their lower efficiency, were replaced with ones powered by liquid gas.

The seats were initially upholstered in orange fabric, later replaced by faux leather. One example of this subunit is listed in the historical asset of the FS Italian Foundation. It underwent restoration to its original Bordeaux Red - Sand Yellow TEE livery and is now used in composition with vintage trains.

=== Van carriage ===
The van cars, built in five units, initially received the UIC classifications 61 83 95-90 900-902 Dz and 61 83 95-90 950-951 Dz, unified to 61 83 95-90 900-904 Dz after the installation of the second motor-alternator unit on the first two units as well.

The van coaches were equipped with a side aisle freely passable by travelers, which was overlooked by several service rooms. In order, the following rooms were encountered:

- a vestibule with no lavatory;
- a baggage room accessible from the corridor or by means of two shutter doors on the outer sides;
- a telephone booth available to travelers for ground-train communications;
- two engine rooms for electrical power conversion units from the catenary;
- a compartment for customs personnel;
- a compartment for the train conductor, equipped with public address equipment and controls for remote unlocking of exterior doors;
- a vestibule equipped with a lavatory.

Installed in each engine room was a three-phase motor-alternator unit with a capacity of 240 kVA at 660 V 50 Hz, which could be supplied from the electric heating duct with each of the four voltages derived from the catenary of the different European administrations, i.e., single-phase alternating current at 1 kV 16 2/3 Hz and 1.5 kV 50 Hz and direct current at 1.5 kV and 3 kV. For each of these groups, it was initially budgeted to power a convoy of up to seven cars in addition to the van. In the case of high composition trains, since parallel connection of the alternators was not planned, it was necessary to place the generator van in the middle of the convoy so that each section would be independently powered.

The first three van cars, numbered progressively from 900 to 902, were built with only one generator set, while the next two, numbered 950 and 951, were equipped with both sets. However, a fairly frequent series of breakdowns soon highlighted the inadequacy of the initial choice of a single motor-generator to power more than five coaches, forcing the FS to take remedial action. In 1977–78, for both reliability and unification reasons, the second generator was installed on all van coaches, which were grouped under serial numbers 900 to 904 (it was precisely the 950 and 951 coaches, which had been equipped with the double generator from the beginning, that underwent the renumbering).

== The operation on the TEE network ==
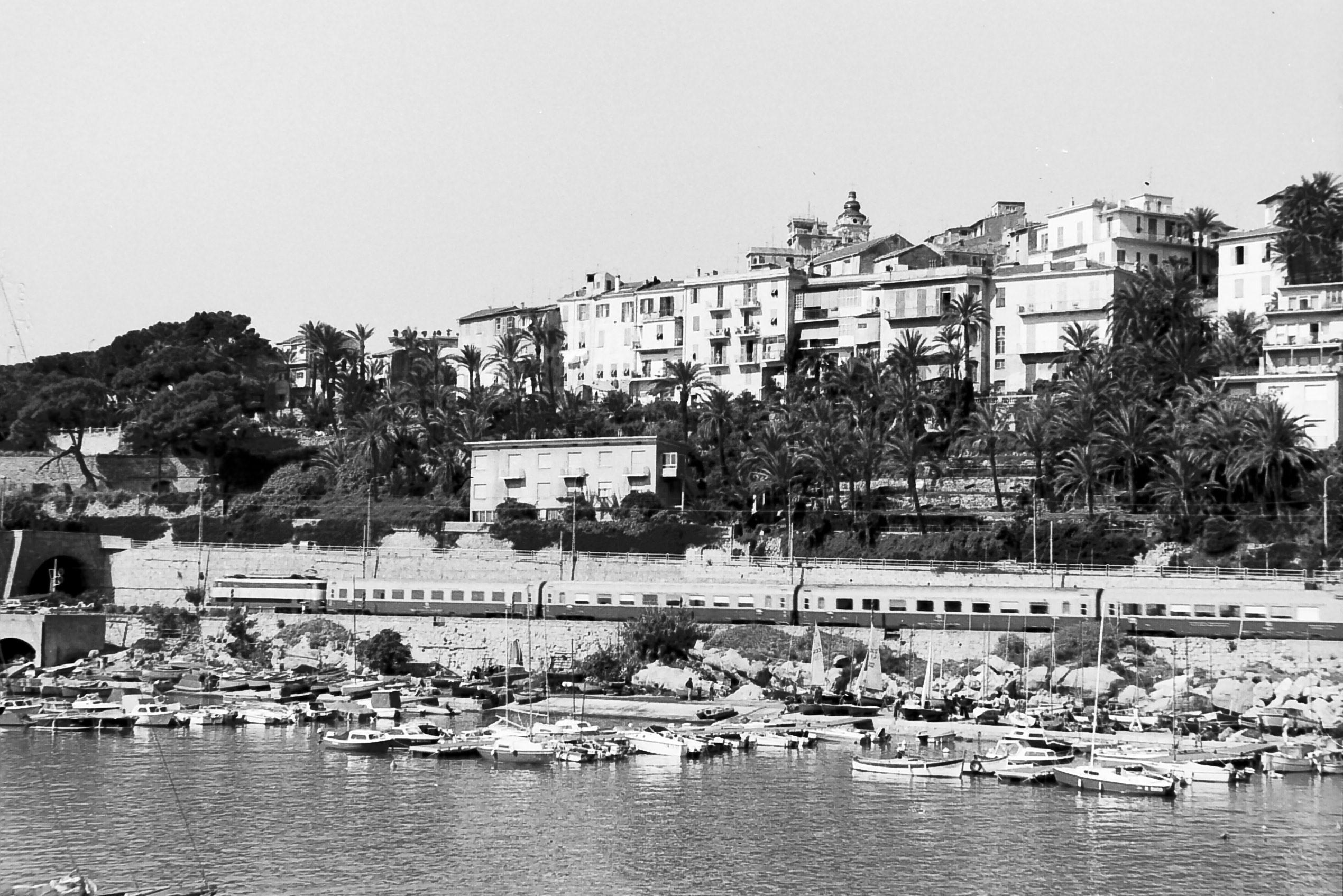
The Milan–Avignon TEE Ligure train in transit at the port of Bordighera in September 1975

The first coaches were delivered to the FS in the first half of 1972. After an initial period of line testing to verify the influence of disturbances generated by on-board equipment on the telephone and signaling circuits of the railway administrations concerned, they were put into regular service on May 28, 1972, on the TEE Lemano between Milan and Geneva. Beginning in the second half of August of that year, on the occasion of the Munich Olympics, the use of TEE FS cars was extended to the TEE Mediolanum between Milan and Munich. With the 1972-73 winter timetable, the new coaches were finally adopted also on the Ligurian TEE between Milan and Avignon. They were not, however, used on the TEE Mont Cenis between Milan and Lyon, also under FS responsibility, which left the TEE grouping as of the same date.

During periods of normal turnout, the above-mentioned TEEs consisted of a generator van, a dining car, a saloon car, and two compartment cars. In busy periods the TEE Lemano and Mediolanum were reinforced with one or two additional carriages, while the Ligure was reinforced with Gran Confort carriages on the Italian section between Milan and Ventimiglia.

Toward the end of the 1970s, the commercial policies of passenger rail transportation began to evolve toward a system that could provide services with high quality and speed features to a wider customer base. These new trends led the French and German railroads to establish the first Intercity lines as a replacement for the corresponding TEEs, often retaining their name and train path by expanding the service to second class. This process extended to Italy as well, with the transformation into Intercity of the Ligure and Lemano, which ran their last run as TEEs on May 22, 1982, followed two years later, on June 2, 1984, by the Mediolanum, which was the last TEE in international service to be operated with FS coaches.

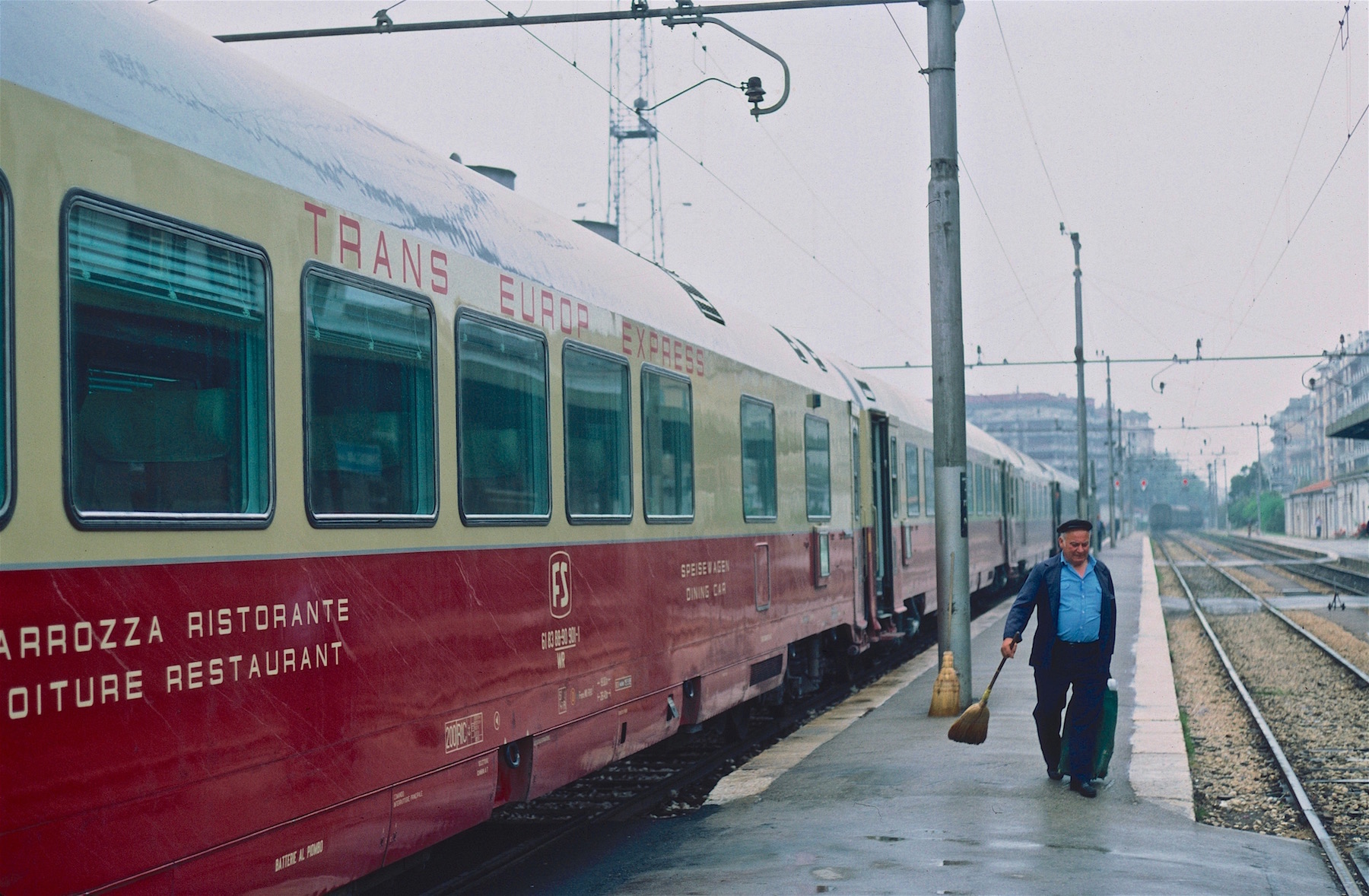
The TEE Adriatico at Pescara in 1985

The TEE coaches that became available as a result of the above conversions were used from June 3, 1984 on the TEE Adriatico in domestic service between Milano Centrale and Bari Centrale, which remained in service as Trans Europ Express until May 30, 1987.

== The transformation into Gran Confort carriages ==
With the disappearance of first-class-only trains, the mixed use of TEE coaches with second-class coaches soon proved too constraining both because of the mandatory presence of the generator van and the complication caused by the dual-power supply line on the same trainset, where the TEE coaches received their electricity from the "train line" and the second-class coaches from the electric heating duct. To remedy these drawbacks, it was decided to transform the TEE coaches into Gran Confort coaches, a modification that entailed, in addition to changing the exterior livery, adapting the electrical system by eliminating the 660 V "train line" and adopting on each coach a 45 kVA static converter fed in direct current at 3000 V from the electric heater conduit.

At the same time as the conversion, provision was made, as was already happening with the Gran Confort coaches of the first series, for equipping the doors with an autonomous closing control activated by a tachometer sensor and the elimination of the centralized remote opening release on the luggage compartment, at the same time making it no longer compulsory, the use of which was already decreasing due to the diminishing use of luggage transport.

In the two years immediately following the demise of the TEEs (1987/89), these coaches were nonetheless used in composition on some of the new Intercity trains, particularly on the IC Tirreno that served the Turin–Rome route.

Between 1990 and 1994, all compartment cars were transformed, which were reclassified as 50 83 18-98 205-217 A.

The saloon cars, transformed between 1992 and 1994, were instead reclassified 50 83 18-98 614-618 A.

The dining cars, converted from the early 1990s with the elimination of the boarding doors on the side opposite the kitchen as for the newer Gran Confort series, were reclassified 50 83 88-90 900-905 WR.

In 1995, it was decided to convert the van coaches, set aside after the conversion of the rest of the former TEE fleet, into dining coaches for the Burghy company; the operation included the division of the interior into a bar area, a service area and a dining area, but following the takeover by another catering company the operation was suspended after the delivery of the first example (former 61 83 95-90 903 D), which re-entered service in 1997 as a "Pizza Express" carriage with the classification 61 83 88-90 999 WR. The car thus converted, after a brief stint as a composition car on interregional trains in northern Italy and later with Trenitalia's Charter Division, was included in the FS vintage rolling stock; repainted in Bandiera livery, it currently operates with historic trains.

Three of the remaining vans were scrapped in the early 1990s, while 901 was reported to be shelved awaiting demolition on July 1, 1994.

== See also ==
- Eurofima coach
- Trans Europ Express

== Bibliography ==
- Lino Tessi; [Linse Tosi] (1974). "I nuovi rotabili TEE–FS". Treni (1): 21–26.
- Lino Tessi; [Linse Tosi] (1974). "I nuovi rotabili TEE–FS". Treni (2): 72–73.
- Mario Cirillo (1978). "La rete dei treni "TEE" dopo 20 anni di esistenza ed il contributo essenziale delle ferrovie italiane alla sua creazione ed al suo continuo perfezionamento". Ingegneria Ferroviaria. 31 (4): 390–397.
- Sergio Pautasso (1979). "Le carrozze TEE delle FS". Italmodel Ferrovie. 29 (229): 29–38.
- Alessandro Albè; Claudio Castiglion (1995). "Il materiale rotabile rimorchiato". TEE. Trans Europ Express. 8 (8): 52–63.
- Erminio Mascherpa (1997). "Un progetto di trent'anni fa". I Treni. 18 (182): 16–17.
- I treni FIAT. Ottant'anni di contributo Fiat alla tecnica ferroviaria. Milano: Automobilia. 1997. pp. 134–139.
- Le carrozze italiane. Carrozze, bagagliai, postali e tipi speciali dal 1945 ad oggi. Desenzano del Garda: Editoriale del Garda. 2000. pp. 112–114.|
- Michele Mingari (2002). "Le carrozze degli anni '70". Tutto treno. 14 (149): 26–32.
- Nozioni sui veicoli FS per viaggiatori. Vicenza: Editrice Veneta. 2002. pp. 281–283.
- David Campione (2004). "Carrozze TEE e Gran Confort (prima parte)". I treni. 25 (262): 10–17.
- David Campione (2004). "Carrozze TEE e Gran Confort (seconda parte)". I treni. 25 (263): 16–23.
- Maurice Mertens; Jean-Pierre Malaspina (2008). TEE. La leggenda dei Trans-Europ-Express. Salò: Editrice Trasporti su Rotaie.
- Michele Mingari; Gianfranco Ferro; Franco Dell'Amico (2009). Viaggio in trifase. 75 anni di corrente alternata FS. Milano: ACME.
- Carrozze FS. Secondo volume: Dalle tipo UIC-Y alle Progetto 901. Albignasego: Duegi itrice. 2009.
- Michele Mingari (2017). "Gran Confort e Tipo Z oggi". I Treni. 38 (407): 24–34.
