= International Wagon Regulations =

International agreement about use of goods wagons in railway traffic

The International Wagon Regulations (Regolamento Internazionale Veicoli or Regolamento Internazionale dei Veicoli ) or RIV about the international use of goods wagons in Europe were first agreed between the European railways in 1922. They were superseded on 1 July 2006 by the General Contract of Use for Freight Wagons (AVV). Nevertheless, the letters RIV continue to stand for goods wagons that are used internationally. Only the loading regulations in Annex II remain in force until further notice. The remainder were superseded by the AVV and replaced or rescinded.

== Technical requirements ==
The RIV laid down the technical requirements that a wagon had to meet in order to be used in international service. Wagons that fulfilled these requirements were given the letters RIV and were allowed to be used on all RIV railways without special permission. It was possible to tell from the first two numbers of the 12-digit wagon number whether it was a RIV wagon. They were given the numbers:

- 01-09
- 11-19
- 21-29
- 31-39

although not all numbers in the sequence were used.

== Non-RIV wagons ==
Wagons without the RIV designation could be used in foreign countries if they were used on special, pre-agreed, services. If a wagon was neither RIV-approved nor on a special service agreed with the country concerned, it had to be classed as an exceptional transport service.

== Loading regulations ==
The loading regulations are covered in Annex II of the RIV; the transfer inspection of goods wagons in Volume XII.

== See also ==
- International Coach Regulations
