= Mont Cenis (train) =

Train service in France and Italy (1957–2003)

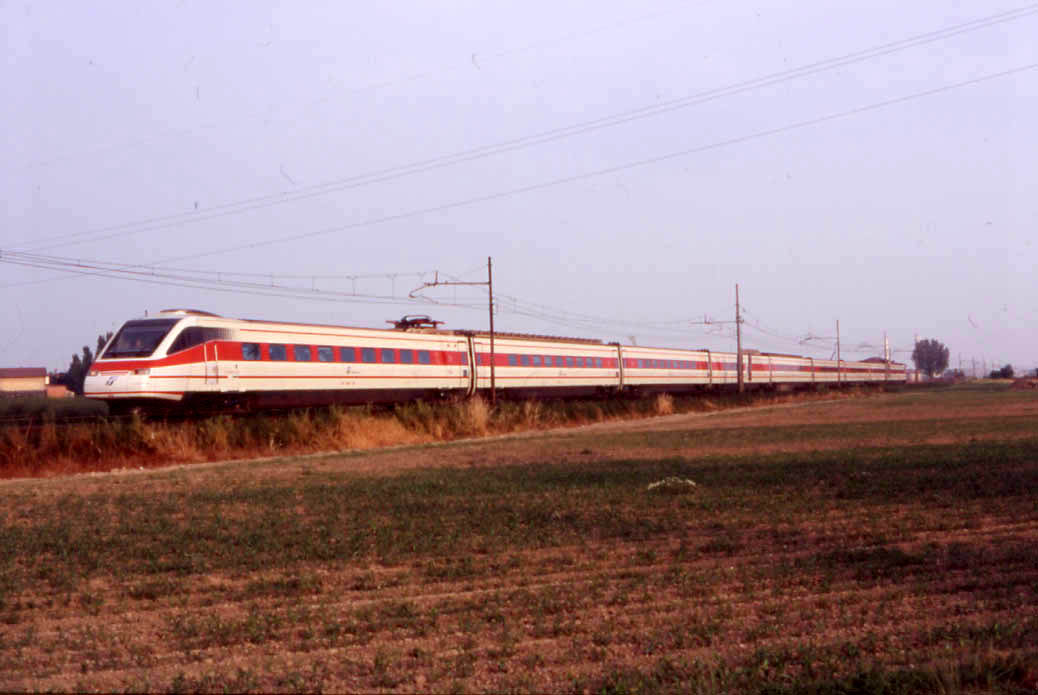
- ETR 460 tilting train

Overview
- Service type: Trans Europ Express (TEE) (1957–1972); Rapide (1972–1980); InterCity (1980–1996); EuroCity (1996–2003)
- Status: Discontinued
- Locale: Italy; France
- Predecessor: Le Transalpin
- First service: 2 June 1957
- Last service: 14 December 2003
- Successor: EC Carravagio
- Former operator(s): SNCF; FS

Route
- Termini: Lyon; Milan
- Distance travelled: 465 km
- Service frequency: Daily
- Line(s) used: Fréjus railway (Lyon-Turin)

Technical
- Track gauge: 1,435 mm (4 ft 8 1/2 in)
- Electrification: 3 kV DC (Italy); 1.5 kV (France)
Route map
- TEE Mont Cenis in the 1957 TEE network

The Mont Cenis was an international express train linking Lyon in France with Milan in Italy. The train was named after the mountain range through which it crossed, inside the Fréjus Rail Tunnel (Mont Cenis tunnel in French) on the French-Italian border.

== History ==
=== Trans Europ Express ===
The Mont Cenis was the upgrading and successor of the French Rapide Le Transalpin running since 1954 between Lyon and Milan on the same route. In 1957 the TEE network was split in a northern and southern part. Centre of the southern part was Milan and it was planned to have four TEE services from and to Milan. However the Italian ALn 442-448 trains weren't available in time for the launch of the TEE network on 2 June 1957, and consequently, the Mont Cenis, operated with French RGP-825, was the only one entering service on time. The RGP-825 was replaced by the Italian ALn 442-448 diesel multiple units on 29 May 1960, so the entire southern part of the TEE network was operated by Ferrovie dello Stato. This replacement wasn't an improvement at all because the ALn 442-448 trains could hardly cope, as seen before on the Brenner route (TEE Mediolanum), with the slopes in mountainous aerea's, and the average speed dropped from 85 km/h to 75 km/h. In 1966 Le Catalan was introduced on the Geneva - Portbou relation and in order to create a timed connection at the crossing point Chambéry the schedule of the westbound Mont Cenis was put forward half an hour, thus creating a first-class link between Milan and Spain.

=== Winter timetable 1971/72 ===
The last timetable of the Mont Cenis as part of the TEE network, France is in the Central European time zone and Italy at that time in the Eastern European time zone, the real traveltime between Modane and Bardonecchia is 20 minutes.

TEE 15	country	station	km	TEE 14
18:00	France	Lyon Perrache	0	11:35
19:13	France	Chambéry	107	10:23
19:23	France	Montméllan	121	**:**
19:57	France	St Jean de Maurienne	178	09:43
20:28	France	Modane	206	09:13
21:48	Italy	Bardonecchia	226	09:54
21:57	Italy	Oulx C.C.S.	237	09:40
22:47	Italy	Torino PN	362	08:37
22:57	Italy	Torino PS	368	08:29
00:25	Italy	Milano Centrale	465	07:00

=== Rapide ===
On 30 September 1972 the ALn 442-448 DMUs were withdrawn from service and mostly replaced by Italy's second generation TEE stock. The Mont Cenis was replaced by a first-class only Rapide operated with French RGP DMUs, although this was former TEE stock the train was painted in Orange/Grey SNCF livery and wasn't part of the TEE network any more. On 28 mei 1978 the rolling stock was replaced by locomotive hauled trains consisting of French Corail and Italian Eurofima coaches. On 1 June 1980 the Mont Cenis was labelled as international InterCity.

=== EuroCity ===
It was not until 29 September 1996, nearly ten years after the introduction of the EuroCity network, that the Mont Cenis became qualified to be a EuroCity. On 29 September 1996 five EuroCity trains were introduced between Lyon and Turin. Three of them, Mont Cenis, Alexandre Dumas and Manzoni ran as far east as Milan; the other two, Fréjus and Monginevro served only the Turin - Lyon section. The Alexander Dumas and Manzoni were TGVs linking Milan and Paris, the other three were operated with FS Class ETR 460 tilting trains. Due to the tilting features the ETR 460 was able to work the mountain railway 30 minutes faster than a TGV. However this Italian train appeared as reliable as the ALn 442-448 stock some decades earlier and after two winters one of the Italian services was withdrawn, in order to enable the other two to be ridden with the trainsets that were available between maintenance. In May 2000 the French wanted to get rid of this Italian troubles and they pushed to replace the ETR 460 with locomotive hauled trains. This materialized on 15 December 2002 and the change of locomotive took place in Modane. One year later the Mont Cenis was replaced by the TGV service Caravaggio and the Mont Cenis became history.

== Works cited ==
- Werbeamt der DB (1971). Vorfahrt in Europa, TEE 1971/72 (in German). Frankfurt am Main: Deutsche Bundesbahn.
- Hajt, Jörg (2001). Das grosse TEE Buch (in German). Bonn/Königswinter: Heel Verlag. ISBN 3-89365-948-X.
- Dell'Amico, Franco (2005). Il TEE Breda (in Italian). Savona: ACME.
- Mertens, Maurice; Malaspina, Jean-Pierre (2007). La Légende des Trans Europ Express (in French). Vannes: LR Presse. ISBN 978-29-036514-5-9.
