= Adriatico (train) =

Express train in Italy

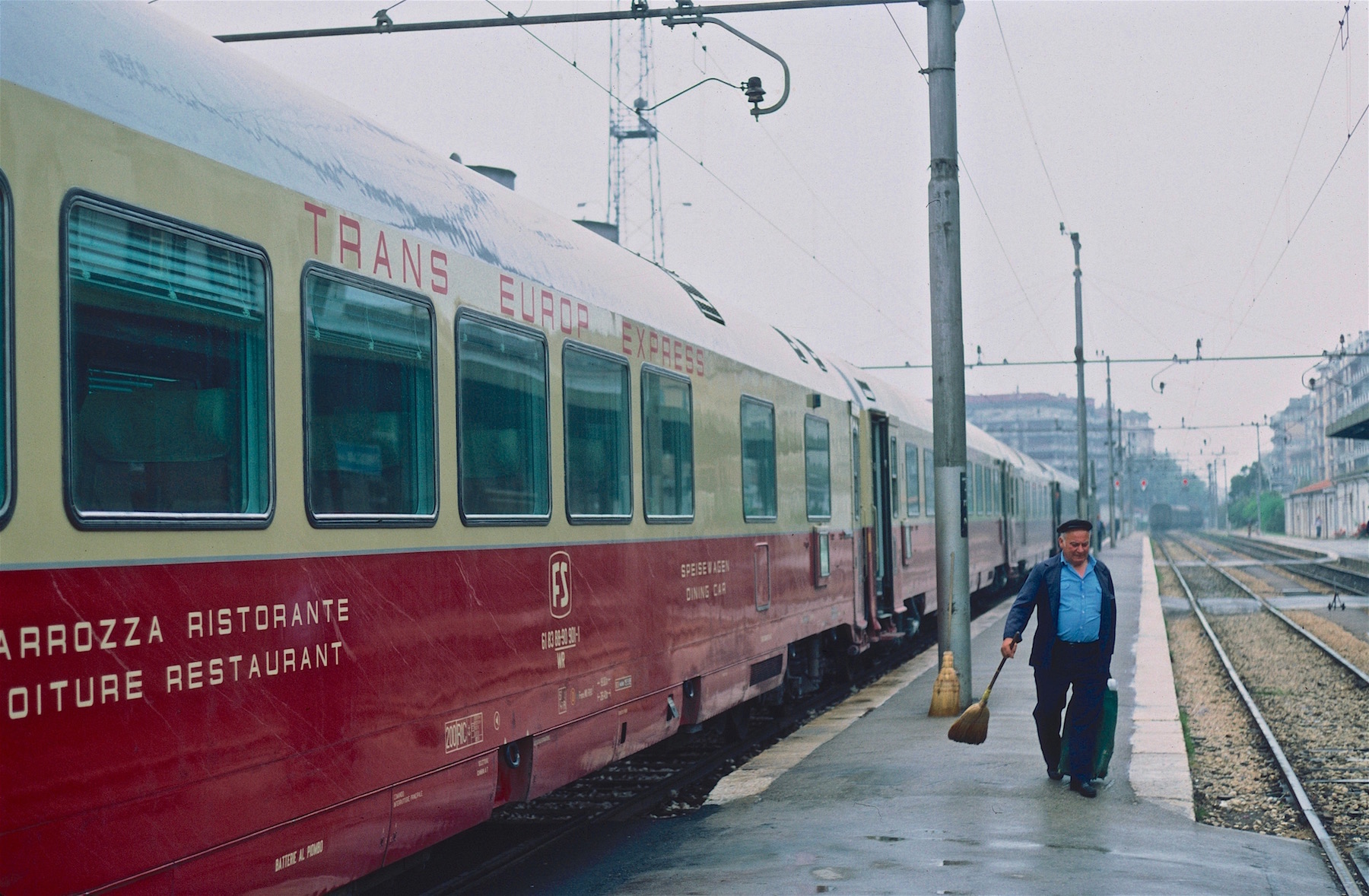
- The TEE Adriatico at Pescara in 1985

Overview
- Service type: Trans Europ Express (TEE) (1973–1987); InterCity(IC) (1987–2005)
- Locale: Italy
- First service: 3 June 1973
- Current operator: Ferrovie dello Stato

Technical
- Track gauge: 1,435 mm (4 ft 8 1/2 in)
- Electrification: 3000 V DC (Italy)

The Adriatico was an express train operated by Ferrovie dello Stato, linking Milan and Bari. It was named for the Adriatic Sea, Mare Adriatico in Italian, as the train's route served the main cities along the shore of the Adriatic between Rimini and Bari.

== Trans Europ Express ==
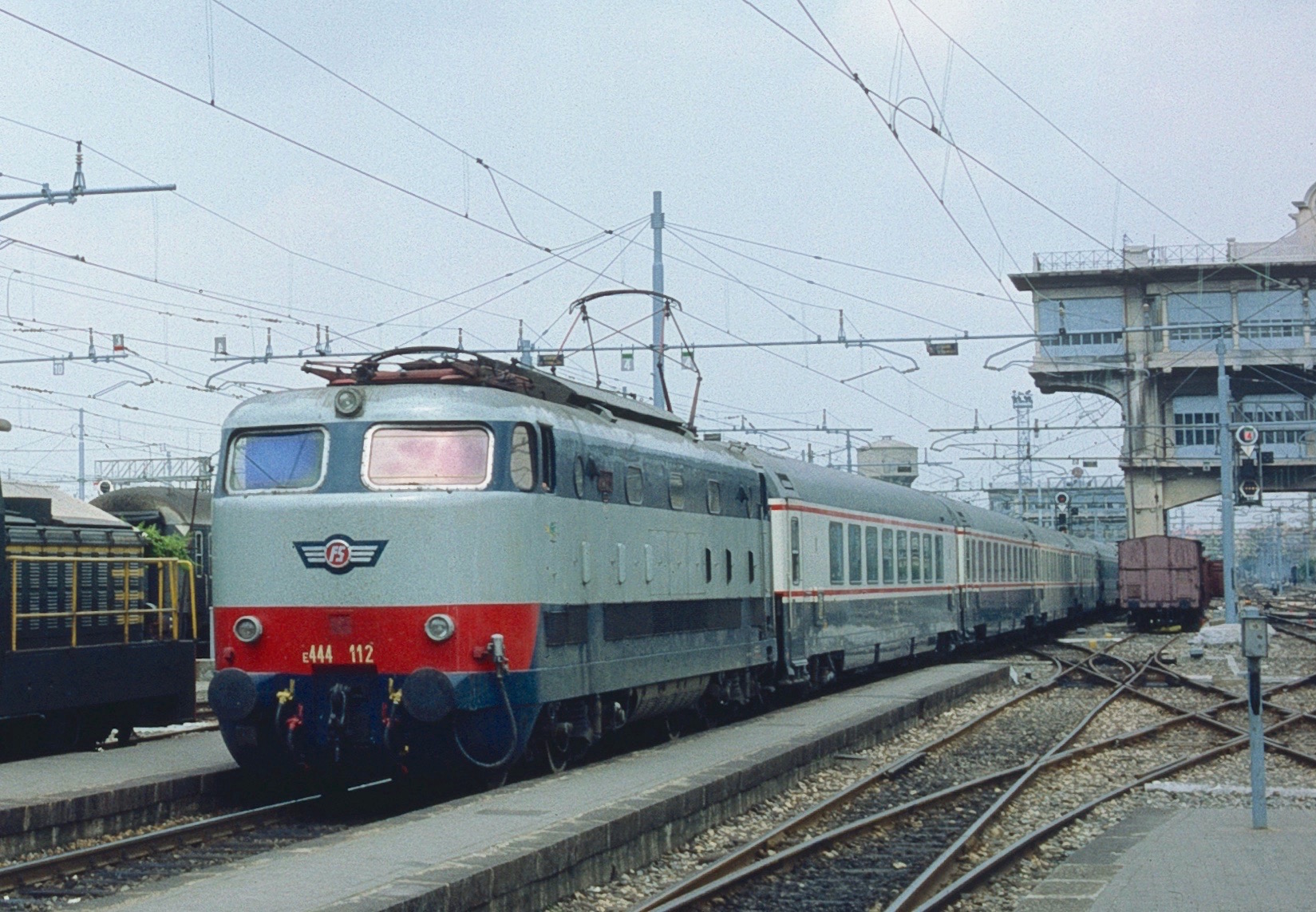
Class E444 locomotive with first-class Gran Conforto coaches, the type used by the TEE Adriatico until 1984, shown in Milano in 1985

In 1969, the Ferrovie dello Stato decided to replace their TEE diesel multiple unit trainsets with locomotive-hauled trains after the German and French examples. Because domestic TEE were allowed since 1965 (TEEs having previously been limited to international services), the order for the Gran Conforto coaches was enlarged, not only to replace the trainsets used on the existing international TEEs but also to convert the high-end domestic services to TEE. After delivery of the international coaches in 1972, two consists of eight and nine coaches each were available in the spring of 1973, and on 3 June 1973 the Adriatico became the first Italian domestic TEE. Initially, the service took 8 hr 35 min from Milan to Bari, thus reaching an average speed of 101 km/h.

TEE 93	country	station	km	TEE 92
12:10	Italy	Milano Centrale	0	19:00
14:02	Italy	Bologna Centrale	219	17:10
14:38	Italy	Forlì	284	16:23
15:04	Italy	Rimini	331	15:59
15:26	Italy	Pesaro	364	15:33
16:04	Italy	Ancona	423	14:59
16:29	Italy	Civitanova Marche		14:32
16:53	Italy	San Benedetto del Tronto		14:08
17:08	Italy	Giulianova		13:53
17:35	Italy	Pescara Centrale		13:30
18:26	Italy	Vasto		12:31
18:34	Italy	Termoli		12:11
19:17	Italy	San Severo		11:35
19:40	Italy	Foggia		11:19
20:45	Italy	Bari Centrale	867	10:10

The service slowed year after year and in 1982 it took 9hr 25min from Milan to Bari. In 1984, the rolling stock from the discontinued TEE Mediolanum was reallocated to the Adriatico, allowing the Adriatico to be operated with coaches in TEE colours thenceforth.

== InterCity ==
On 31 May 1987, the Adriatico was converted to a two-class InterCity service. On 10 June 2001, the northern terminus was changed from Milan to Venice, and from 11 December 2005 the southern terminus was moved 149 km farther south, to Lecce.

== Works cited ==
- Hajt, Jörg (2001). Das grosse TEE Buch (in German). Bonn/Königswinter: Heel Verlag. ISBN 3-89365-948-X.
- Mertens, Maurice; Malaspina, Jean-Pierre (2007). La Légende des Trans Europ Express (in French). Vannes: LR Presse. ISBN 978-29-036514-5-9.
