= International Coach Regulations =

Regulations covering international use of passenger coaches among European railways

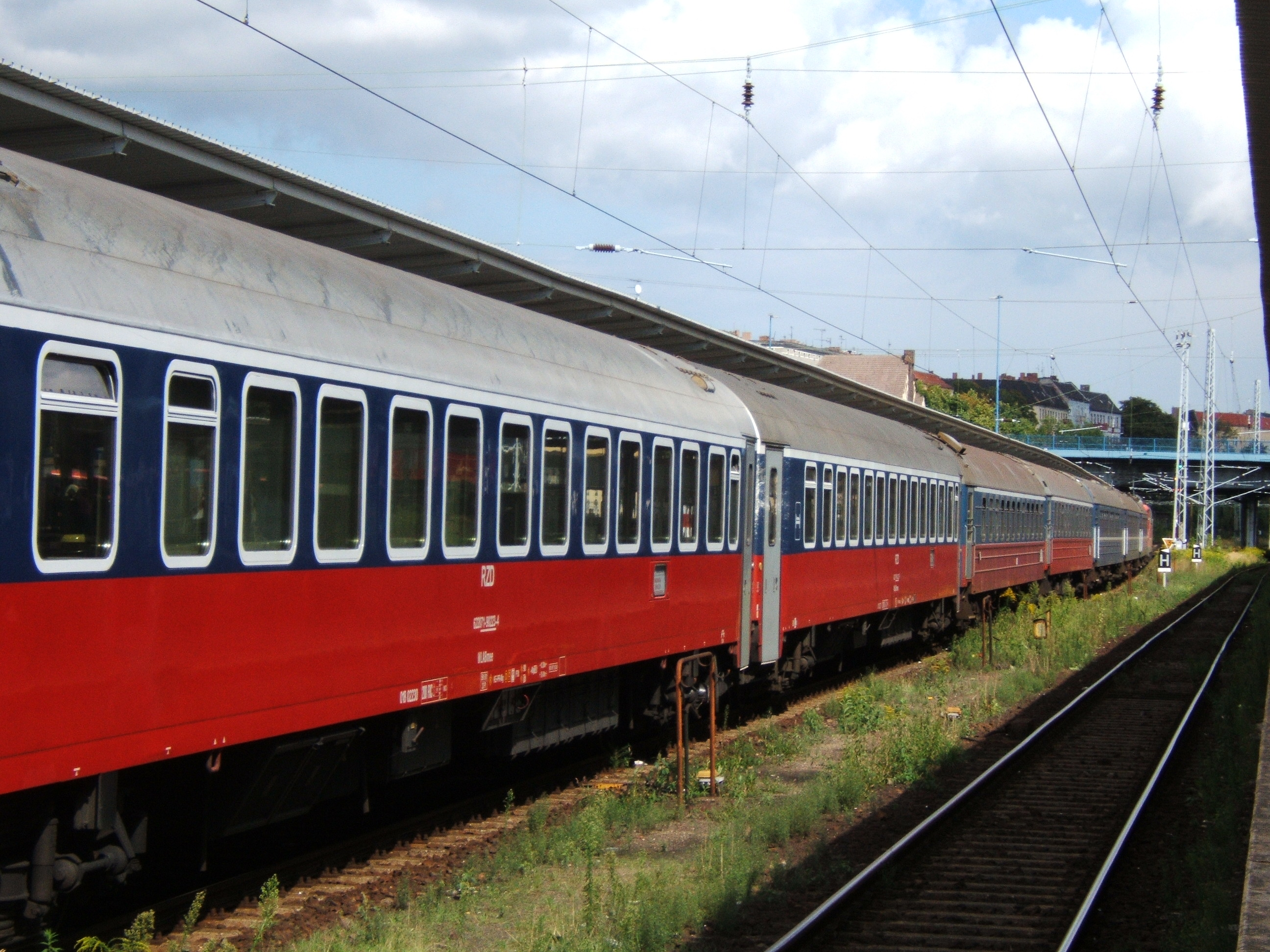
RIC-compliant sleeping cars of the Russian Railways at Berlin-Lichtenberg railway station in August 2006

The International Coach Regulations or RIC (Regolamento Internazionale delle Carrozze) were first agreed in 1922 and covered the international use of railway passenger coaches between European railways. Until 1982 the RIC was looked after by the Swiss Federal Railways, but since then the International Union of Railways (UIC) has taken responsibility for them. Today 27 railway companies from all the European countries apart from the United Kingdom, Ireland and Finland are party to the RIC agreement.

== Technical requirements ==
The RIC lays down the technical requirements that a coach must meet in order to be used in international services. Coaches that fulfil these requirements are given the symbol RIC and can be used on all RIC railways without needing special permission.

== RIC table ==
RIC table

In the RIC table painted on the coach the permitted top speed, voltages and maximum current through the collector is stated. An anchor symbol indicates that the coach is suitable for use on ferries. If country codes are displayed in the table, the coach is only cleared for use in those countries.

== Numbering ==
The wagon number of an RIC coach begins with 51, 52, 53, 61, 62, 63, 71 or 73. Wagon number 71 was only used from 1971 to 1995 for the international sleeping car pool, also known as the TEN Pool. This pool was only used in Western Europe and only contained CIWL and DSG sleepers.

== Non-RIC coaches ==
Normal wagon table for a coach without RIC approval

There are also internationally operating coaches without RIC clearance. These require a special agreement between the railways on whose networks they are intended to be used. Such coaches may also have an RIC table painted on them, but with a cross instead of the letters RIC and showing the relevant country codes (excluding the coach's home country).

== See also ==
- International Wagon Regulations
- UIC - RIC Passenger Car Numbering Scheme https://web.archive.org/web/20160304105835/http://www.blainestrains.org/pdfs/RIC.pdf
