= Mediolanum (train) =

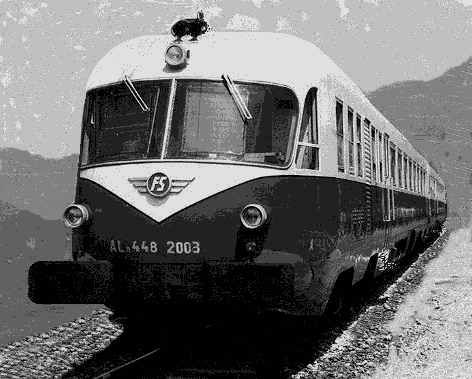
- The Mediolanum consisted of FS Class ALn 442-448 railcars from 1957 to 1969.

Overview
- Service type: Trans Europ Express (TEE) (1957–1984); InterCity (IC) (1984–1987), (2001–2004); EuroCity (EC) (2004–)
- Locale: Germany; Austria; Italy; Switzerland
- First service: 15 October 1957
- Former operator(s): DB / FS / ÖBB / SBB-CFF-FFS / FS / Cisalpino

Route
- Termini: München Hbf / Dortmund Hbf / Basel SBB; Milano C
- Service frequency: Daily

Technical
- Track gauge: 1,435 mm (4 ft 8 1/2 in)
- Electrification: 15 kV AC, 16.7 Hz (Germany, Austria, Switzerland); 3 kV DC (Italy)
Route map
- Map showing in red the route of the Mediolanum during its entire time as a TEE (1957–84). Shown in grey are the other TEE trains existing in mid-1957.

The word Mediolanum has been used to name three distinct international express trains that have run to and from Milano Centrale in Milan, Italy since 1957. The focus of these trains on the city now known as Milan reflects the fact that Mediolanum is the Latin word for ancient Milan.

== History ==
The first Mediolanum was a first-class-only Trans Europ Express (TEE). It linked München Hbf in Munich, Germany, with Milano Centrale, via the Brenner railway. Introduced in 1957, it was operated by the Deutsche Bundesbahn (DB), the Austrian Federal Railways (ÖBB) and the Italian State Railways (FS).

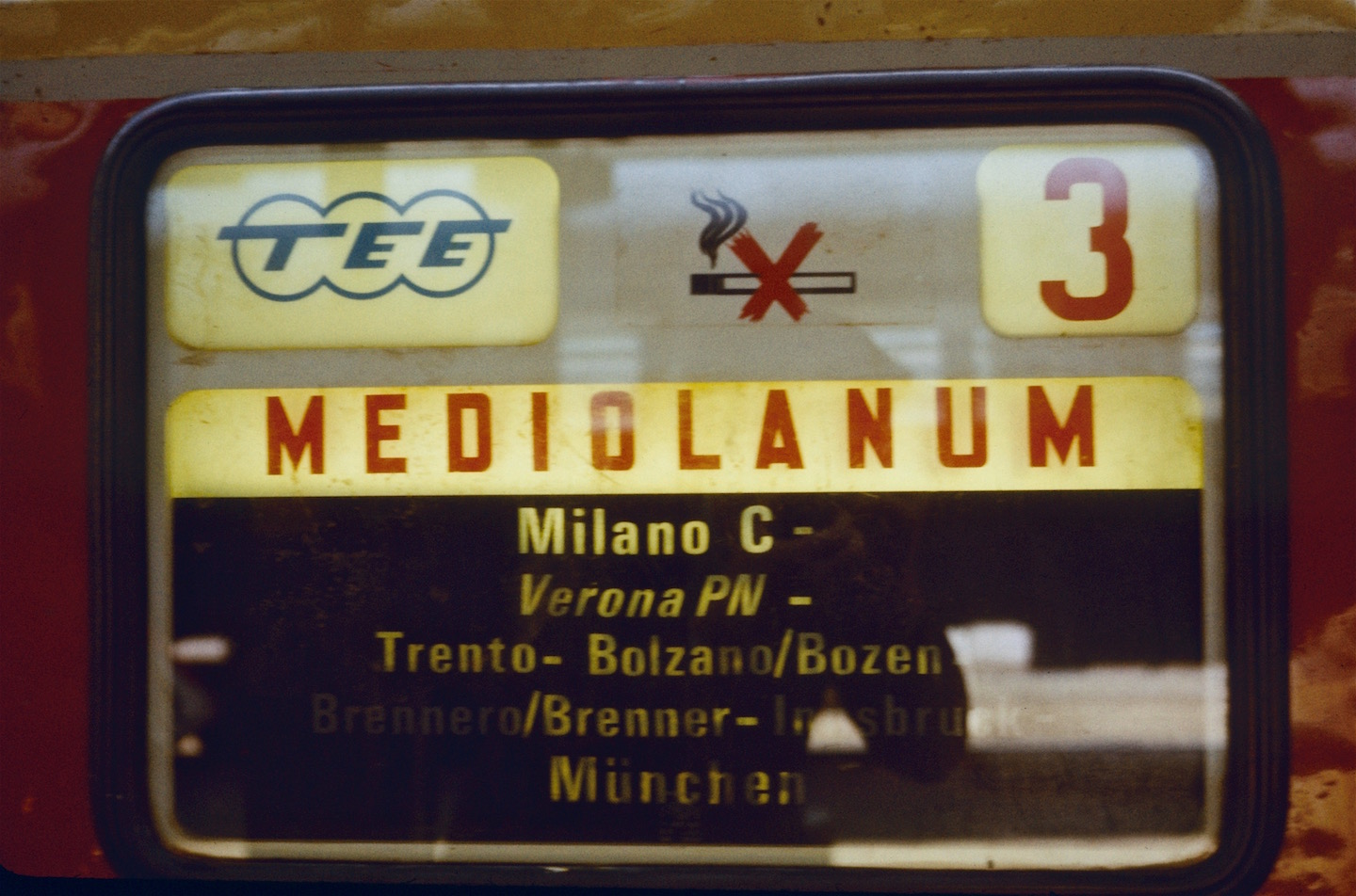
Sign in the side of one car of the TEE Mediolanum in 1982

On 3 June 1984, the train was downgraded from a TEE to a two-class InterCity, but was extended north from Munich to Dortmund (Hbf), in place of an IC train previously named Nymphenburg, on the same schedule as the latter had used. Now operating between Dortmund and Milan via Munich and the Brenner line, this second Mediolanum was operated by the same three operators, but only until 1987, when it was replaced by the EuroCity Leonardo da Vinci, running on the same route and schedule.

In 2001, Mediolanum was revived as the name of an InterCity, this time for train IC 253/254 between Basel SBB in Basel, Switzerland, and Milano Centrale. The third Mediolanum was operated by the Swiss Federal Railways (SBB-CFF-FFS) and FS until 2004, when it was reclassified as a EuroCity and its operation transferred to Cisalpino.

== Rolling stock ==
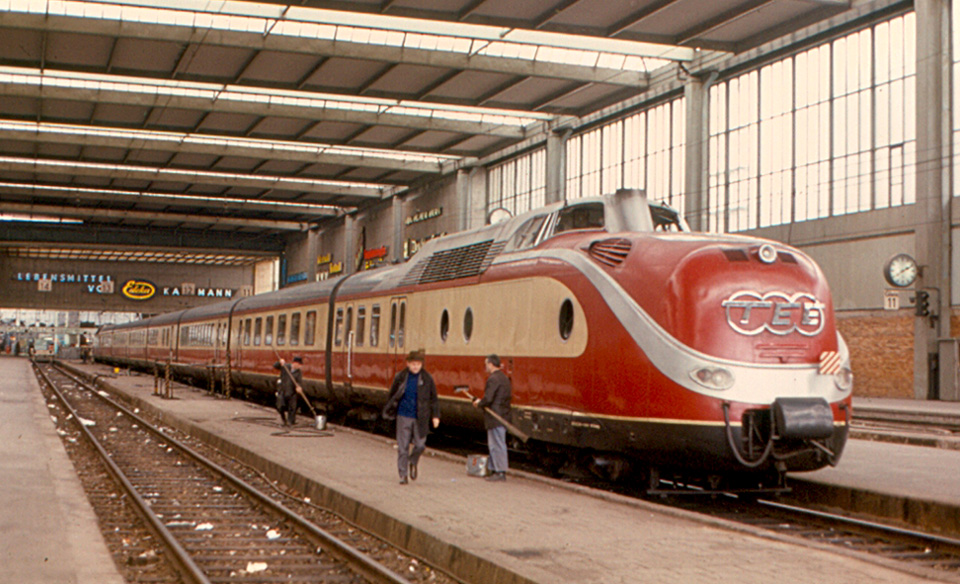
The Mediolanum at München Hbf. in 1970, during the three-year period when the train was using German VT 11.5-type DMU trainsets

During its time as a TEE, the Mediolanum changed several times from using Italian cars to German ones or vice versa. Originally, it used FS diesel multiple-unit (DMU) trainsets of class ALn 442–448. In 1969, these were replaced by German (DB) diesel multiple units, of class VT 11.5. In 1972, the train returned to using Italian FS cars, but now electric locomotive-hauled instead of multiple-unit trainsets, with different locomotives over different portions of the route. In summer 1977, the train was once again using DB coaches, remaining locomotive-hauled, but in autumn 1979 it returned to using FS coaches. When the TEE Mediolanum was using Italian cars, its restaurant car was operated by Wagons-Lits, and when it was using German cars, the restaurant was operated by the German Sleeper and Dining Car Company (DSG).

== See also ==
- History of rail transport in Austria
- History of rail transport in Germany
- History of rail transport in Italy
- History of rail transport in Switzerland
- List of named passenger trains of Europe
- TEE carriages of FS
